= List of Art Deco architecture in North Carolina =

This is a list of buildings that are examples of the Art Deco architectural style in North Carolina, United States.

== Asheboro ==
- Acme-McCrary Corporation, Asheboro, 1940s
- Asheboro Hosiery Mill No, 2, Asheboro, 1945
- Randolph Hospital, Asheboro, 1932
- Asheboro Municipal Building, 1938

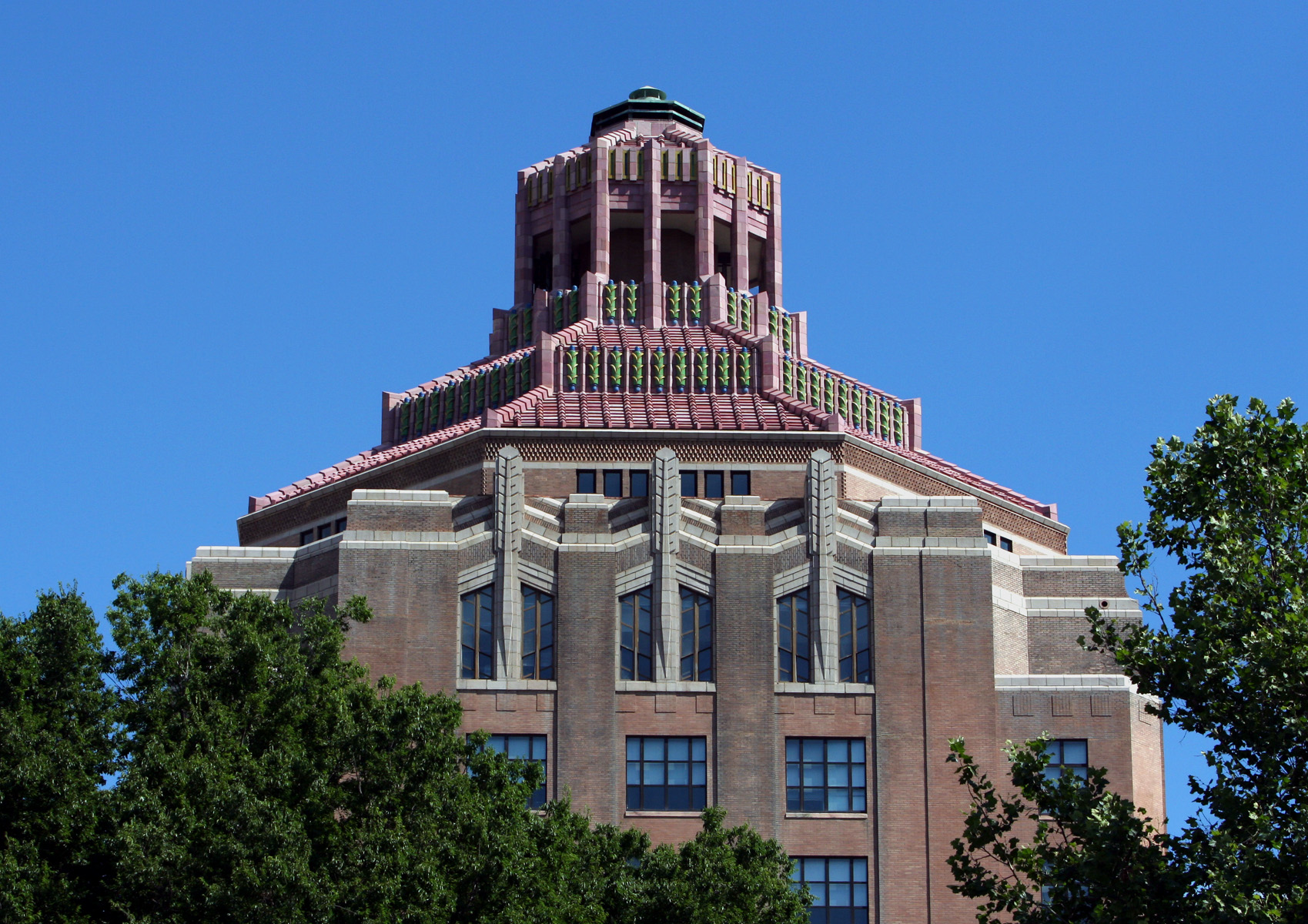
Asheville City Hall, Asheville

== Asheville ==
- Asheville City Hall, Asheville, 1928
- Asheville High School, Asheville, 1927
- Asheville Transfer and Storage Company Building, Asheville, 1929
- Bon Marche Department Store (now Earth Guild), Downtown Asheville Historic District, Asheville, 1937
- Clarence Barker Memorial Hospital, Asheville, 1929
- Coxe Building, Asheville, 1930
- F. W. Woolworth Building, Downtown Asheville Historic District, Asheville, 1939
- Fire Station No. 4, Asheville, 1927
- First Baptist Church, Asheville, 1927
- Flatiron Building, Downtown Asheville Historic District, Asheville, 1925
- Haverty Furniture Building, Asheville, 1928
- Isis Music Hall, West Asheville End of Car Line Historic District, Asheville, 1937
- Kress Emporium (former S. H. Kress and Co. Building), Asheville, 1927
- McGeahy Building, West Asheville–Aycock School Historic District, Asheville, 1934
- S&W Cafeteria, Asheville, 1929
- Shell Filling Station (now jewelers), Asheville, 1928
- The Strand (now Fine Arts Theater), Asheville, 1946
- United States District Court for the Western District of North Carolina, Asheville, 1929

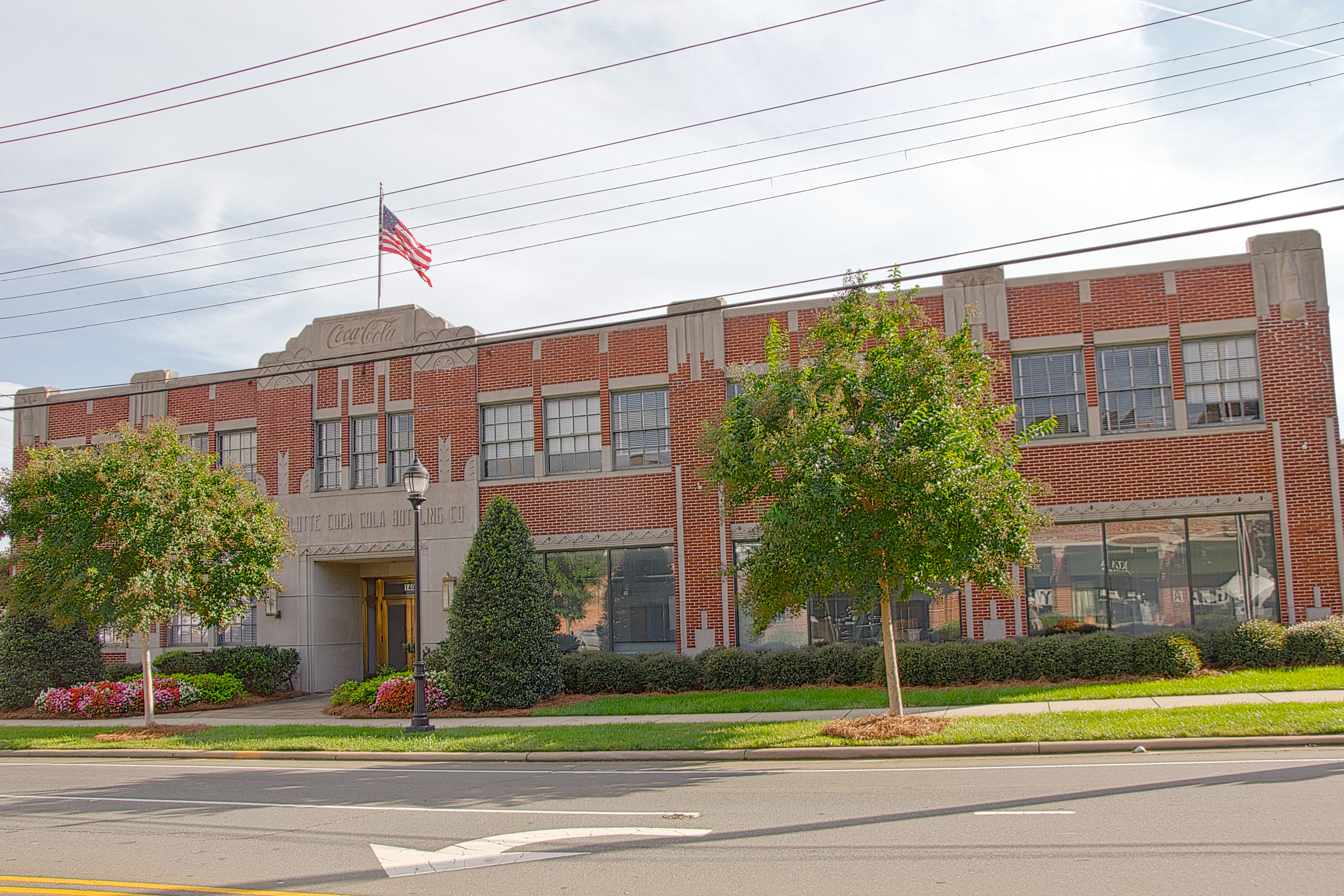
Charlotte Coca-Cola Bottling Company Plant, Charlotte

== Charlotte ==
- American Legion Memorial Stadium, Charlotte, 1934
- Barringer Hotel, Charlotte, 1940 and 1950
- Century Building, Charlotte, 1926
- Charlotte Coca-Cola Bottling Company Plant, Charlotte, 1930
- Crane Company Building, Charlotte, 1928
- Mecklenburg Investment Company Building, Charlotte, 1922

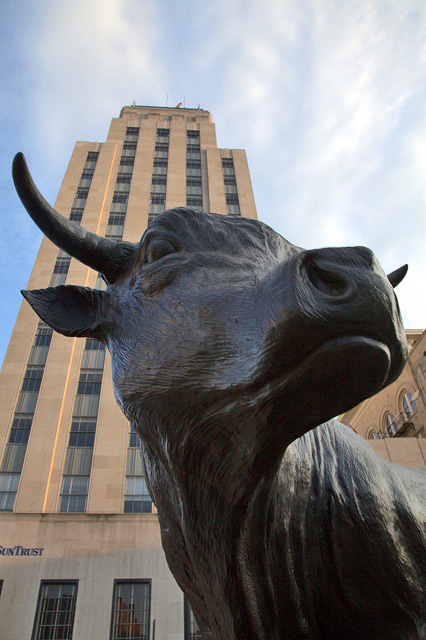
Hill Building, Durham

== Durham ==
- Clark and Sorrell Garage, Durham, 1932 and 1941
- Crowe Building, American Tobacco Historic District, Durham, 1953
- Durham Armory, 1935
- East Durham Junior High School (now Holton Career & Resource Center), Durham, 1939
- Fowler Building, Durham American Tobacco Historic District, Durham, 1939
- Herald-Sun Building, Durham, 1930
- Hill Building, Durham, 1937
- Liggett Office Building, Durham, 1920, 1946
- Royal Crown Cola – 7up Bottling Company Building, Durham, 1939
- S. H. Kress and Co. Building, Durham, 1933
- Scott and Roberts Dry Cleaning Plant, Office, and Store, Durham, 1947
- Snow Building, Durham, 1933
- Strickland Building, Durham American Tobacco Historic District, Durham, 1946
- Weeks Motor Company/Hutchin's Auto Supply, Durham, 1948

== Elizabeth City ==
- Selig Building, Elizabeth City Historic District, Elizabeth City, 1925
- Sheep–Harney Auditorium, Northside Historic District, Elizabeth City, 1950s
- S. L. Sheep School, Northside Historic District, Elizabeth City, 1940

== Gastonia ==
- S. H. Kress and Co. Building, Downtown Gastonia Historic District, Gastonia, 1930
- United States Post Office, Downtown Gastonia Historic District, Gastonia, 1935
- Webb Theatre, Gastonia, 1930

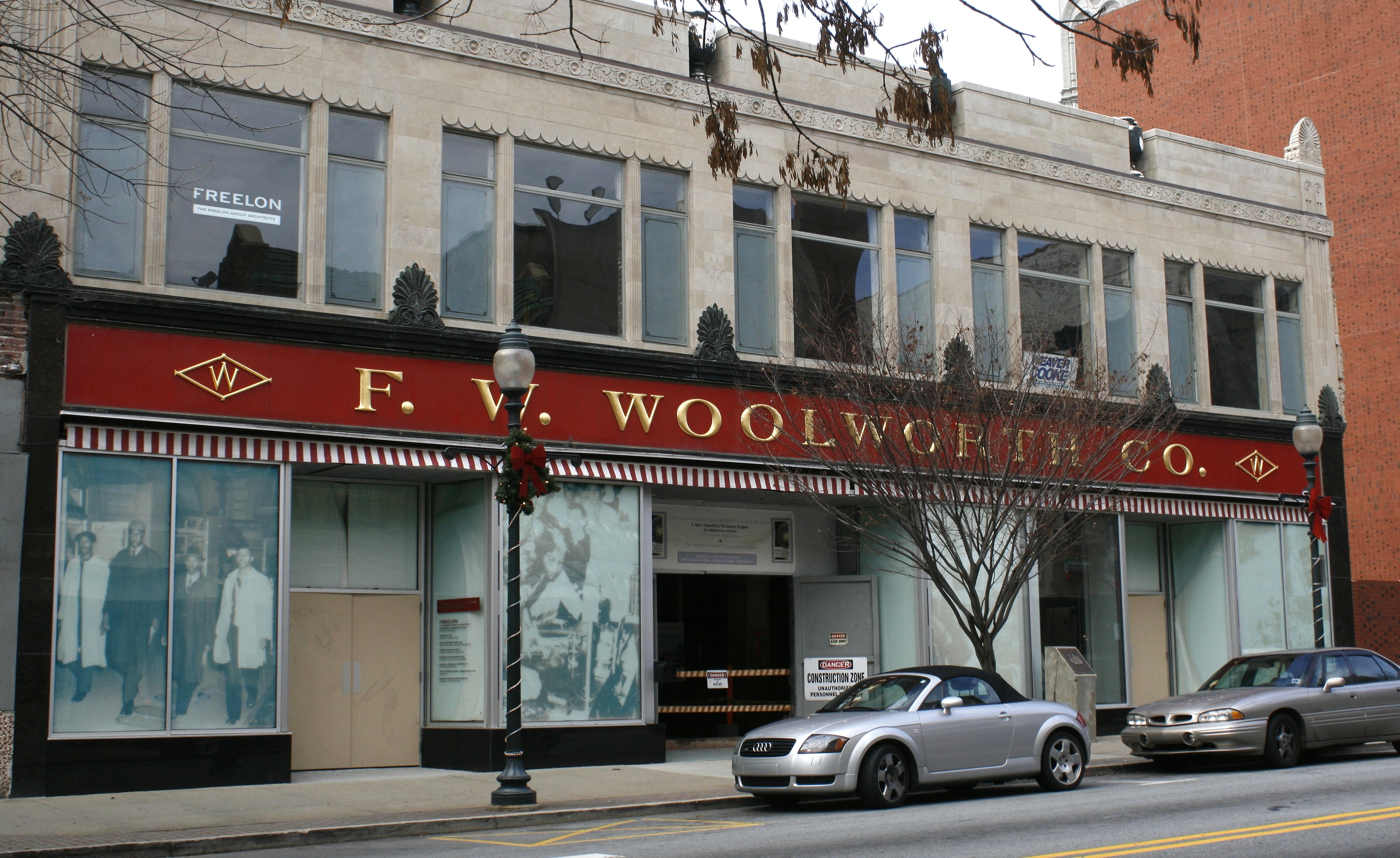
International Civil Rights Center and Museum, Greensboro

== Greensboro ==
- Ellis-Stone Building/Thalimer Department Store, Downtown Greensboro Historic District, Greensboro, 1906 and 1930s
- Guilford County Office and Court Building, Greensboro, 1937
- International Civil Rights Center and Museum (former F. W. Woolworth Building), Greensboro, 1939
- Isaacson Building, Downtown Greensboro Historic District, Greensboro, 1900 and 1930s
- L. Richardson Preyer Federal Building, Greensboro, 1933
- Mock, Judson, Voehringer Company Hosiery Mill, Greensboro, 1926
- S. H. Kress and Co. Building, Greensboro, 1929

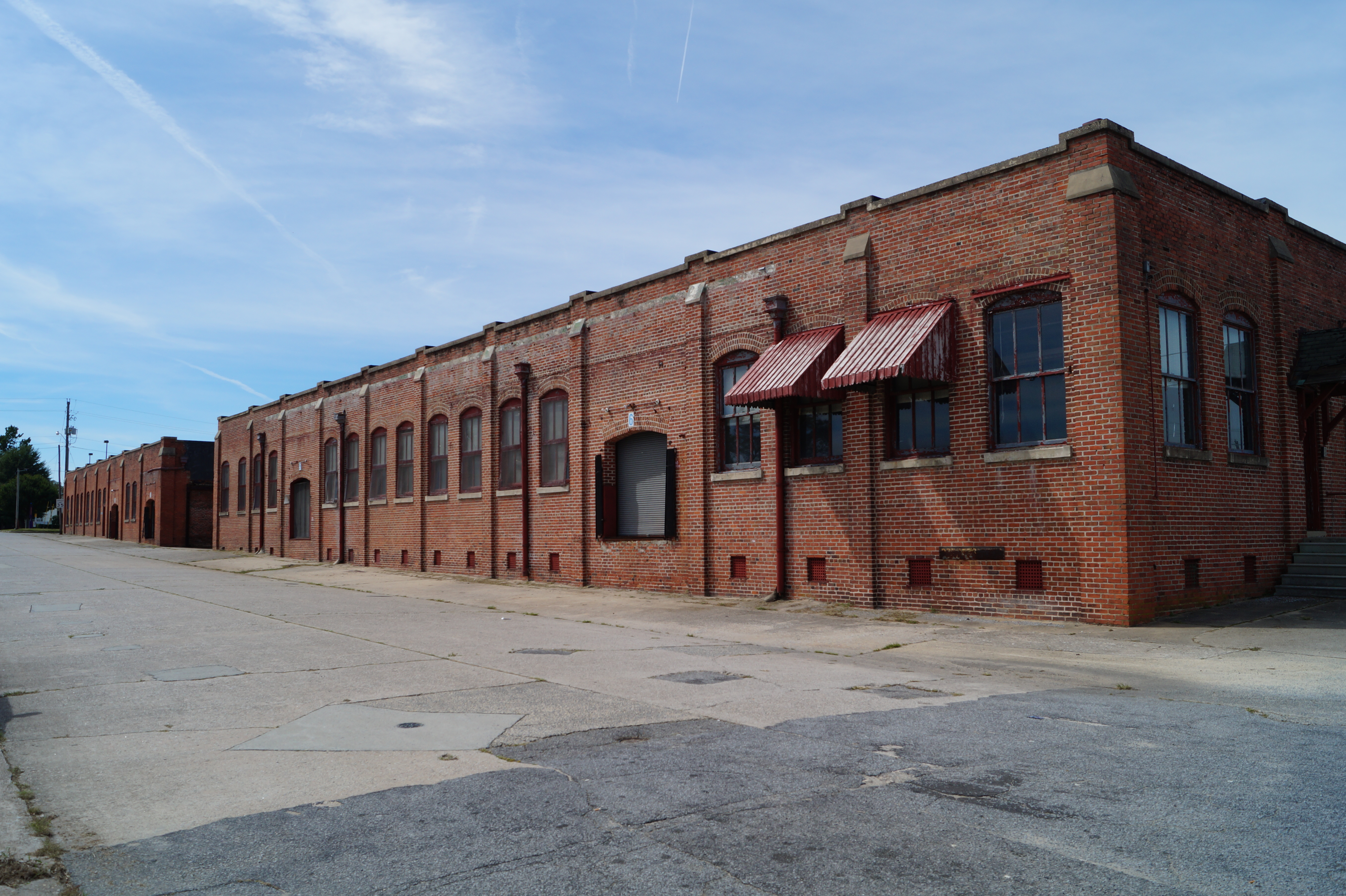
Star Warehouse, Greenville

== Greenville ==
- Bissette's Drug Store, Greenville Commercial Historic District, Greenville, 195
- Greenville Municipal Building, Greenville Commercial Historic District, Greenville, 1939
- L. M. Ernst Son & Company Building, Dickinson Avenue Historic District, Greenville, 1946
- Lautares Brothers Building, Greenville Commercial Historic District, Greenville, 1940
- Montgomery Ward Department Store, Greenville Commercial Historic District, Greenville, 1929
- Roxy Theatre, Greenville, 1948
- Smith Electric Building, Greenville Commercial Historic District, Greenville, 1920 and 1933
- Star Warehouse, Greenville Tobacco Warehouse Historic District, Greenville, 1930

== Hamlet ==
- Old Hamlet Opera House, Main Street Commercial Historic District, Hamlet, 1912 and 1927
- Subway Stations, Main Street Commercial Historic District, Hamlet, 1940
- Union Building, Main Street Commercial Historic District, Hamlet, 1920

== Kinston ==
- Carolina Theatre, Kinston Commercial Historic District, Kinston, 1935
- Community Council for the Arts (former Kinston Garage), Kinston Commercial Historic District, Kinston, 1936
- Hotel Kinston, Kinston, 1928
- Lenoir County Courthouse, Kinston, 1939
- Standard Drug No. 2, Kinston, 1924

== Lenoir ==
- Caldwell County Courthouse, Lenoir, 1929
- Center Theatre, Lenoir Downtown Historic District, Lenoir, 1941
- O. P. Lutz Furniture Company and Lutz Hosiery Mill, Lenoir Downtown Historic District, Lenoir, 1939

== Mount Airy ==
- Earle Theatre, Mount Airy Historic District, Mount Airy, 1938
- Masonic Temple, Mount Airy Historic District, Mount Airy, 1931
- United States Post Office, Mount Airy Historic District, Mount Airy, 1932
- Workman's Federal Savings and Loan, Mount Airy Historic District, Mount Airy, 1891 and 1930s

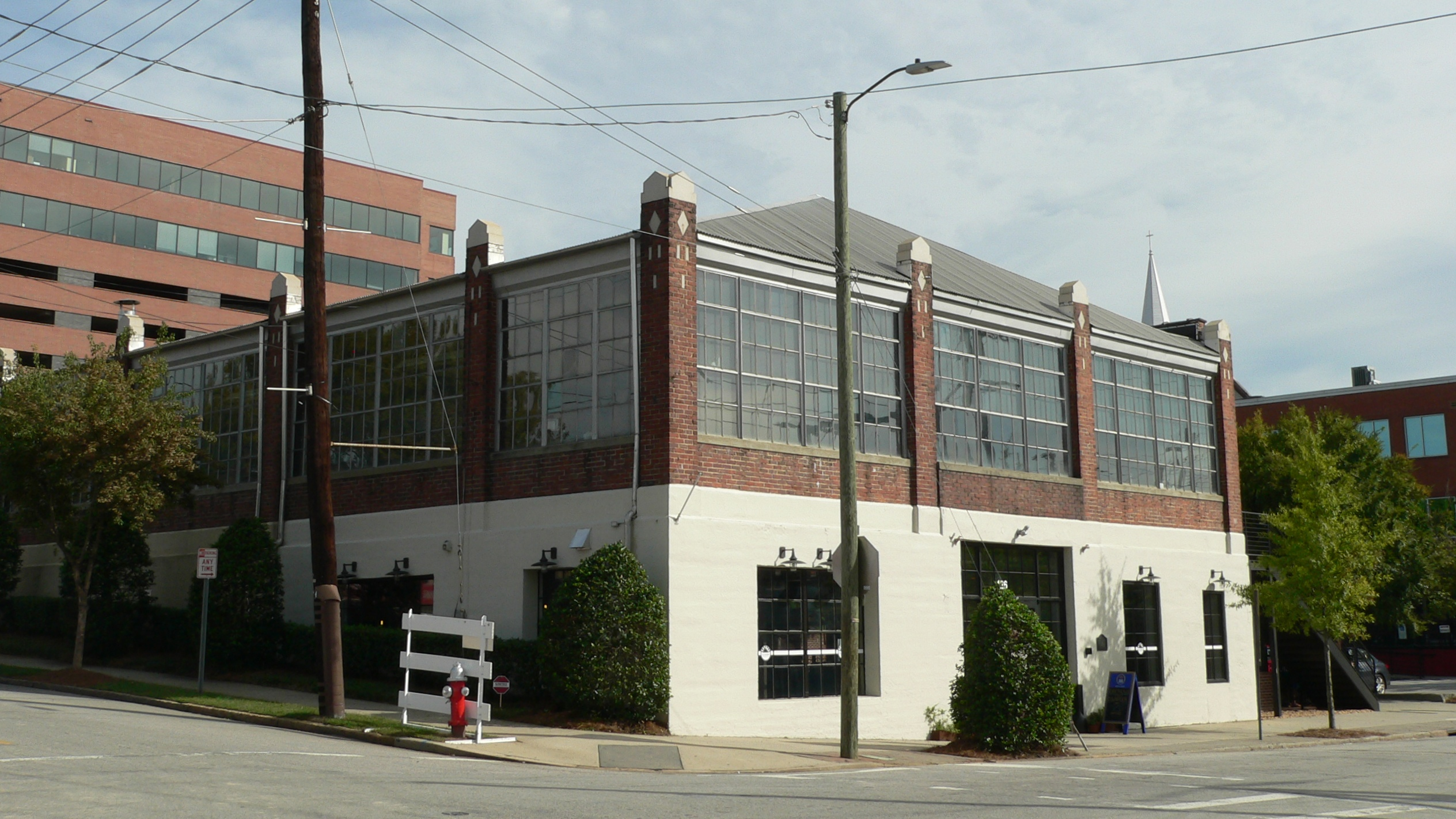
Carolina Power and Light Company Car Barn and Automobile Garage, Raleigh

== Raleigh ==
- Capital Club Building, Raleigh, 1929
- Carolina Power and Light Company Car Barn and Automobile Garage, Raleigh, 1925
- CP & L Garage (now a tire shop), Raleigh, 1925
- Pine State Creamery, Raleigh, 1928
- Raleigh Water Works and E.B. Bain Water Treatment Plant, Raleigh, 1939
- Royal Baking Company, Raleigh, 1941

== Rocky Mount ==
- 122 Howard Street commercial building, Rocky Mount, 1930s
- 625 Sunset Apartments, Rocky Mount, 1945
- Baldwin Department Store, 100 NW Main, Rocky Mount
- CenturyLink Building (former Carolina Telephone & Telegraph Building), Rocky Mount Central City Historic District, Rocky Mount, 1948
- former Downtown Wig Market, 100 NW Main, Rocky Mount, 1910, 1940
- Firestone Stores Building, Rocky Mount Central City Historic District, Rocky Mount, 1930
- former Grand Theatre, Rocky Mount, 1912, 1930s
- James Craig Braswell School, Rocky Mount, 1940
- Manhattan Theatre, Rocky Mount Central City Historic District, Rocky Mount, 1935
- Memorial Hospital, Rocky Mount, 1937
- Ritz Theatre, 150 E. Thomas, Rocky Mount, 1950
- former Rosenbloom-Levy store, 146 Southwest Main, Rocky Mount, 1905, 1930s

== Winston-Salem ==
- Pepper Building, Winston-Salem, 1928
- Reynolds Building, Winston-Salem, 1929
- Sosnik-Morris-Early Commercial Block, Winston-Salem, 1929

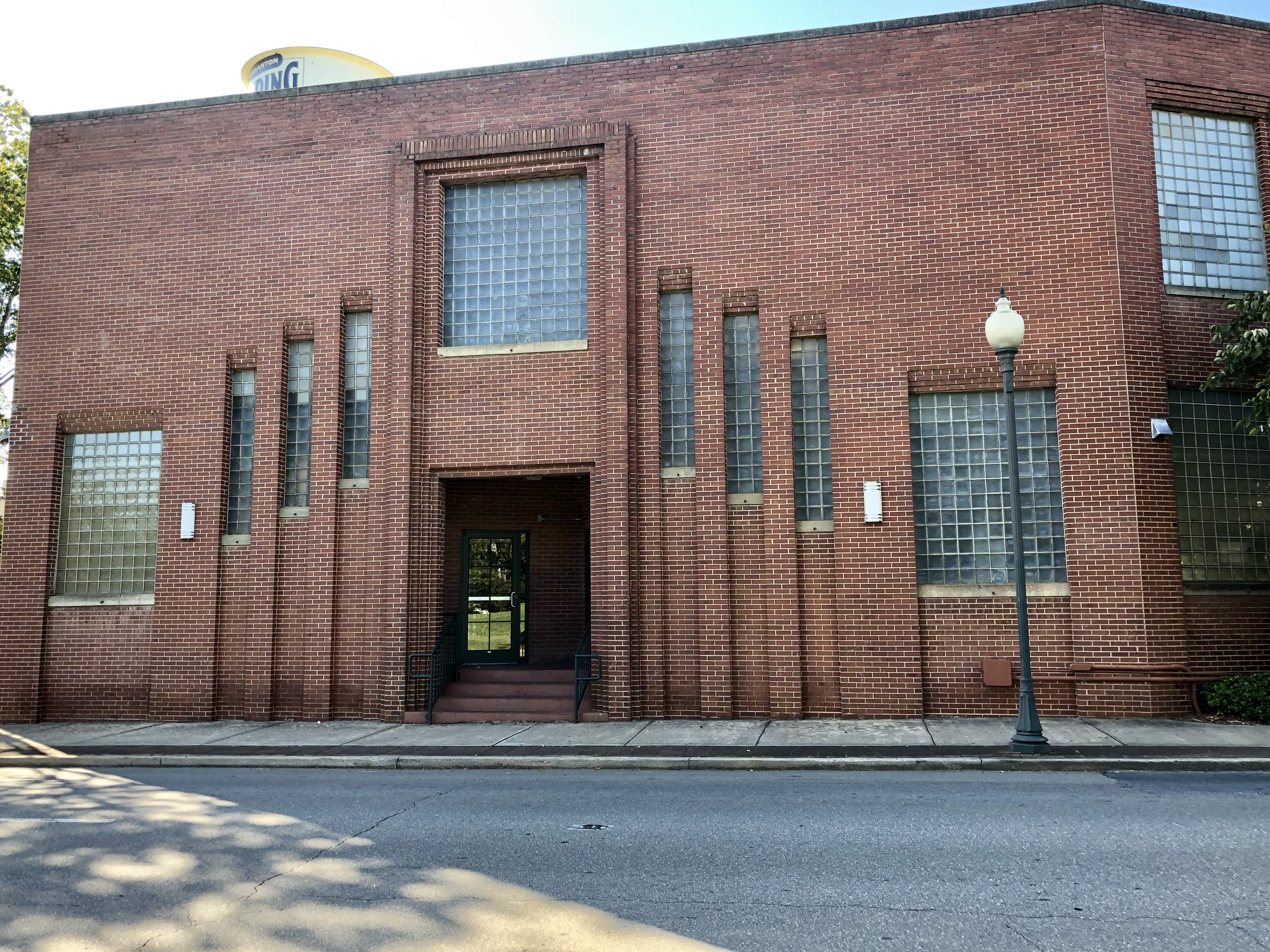
Garrou-Morganton Full-Fashioned Hosiery Mills, Morganton

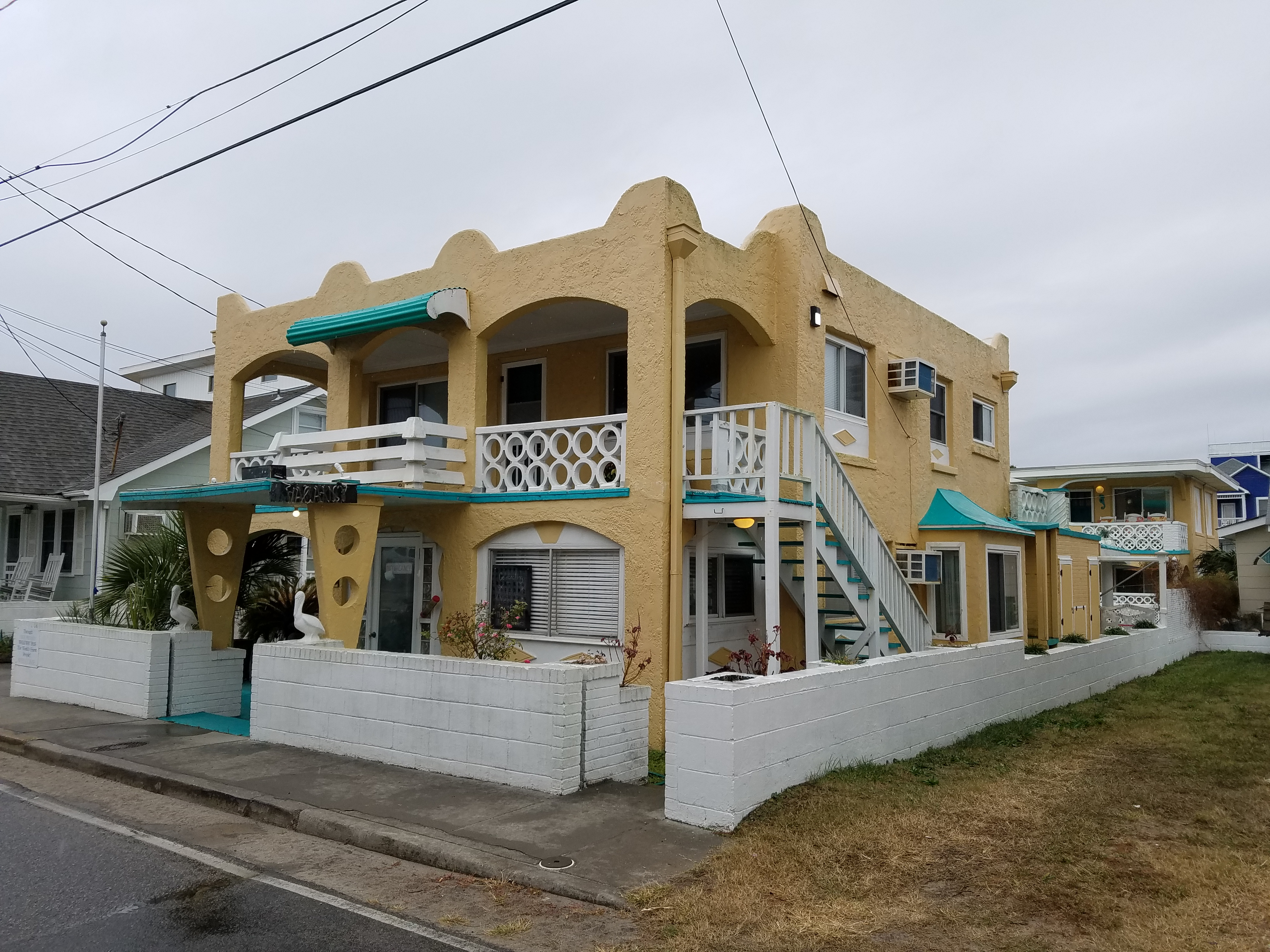
Joy Lee Apartment Building and Annex, Wilmington

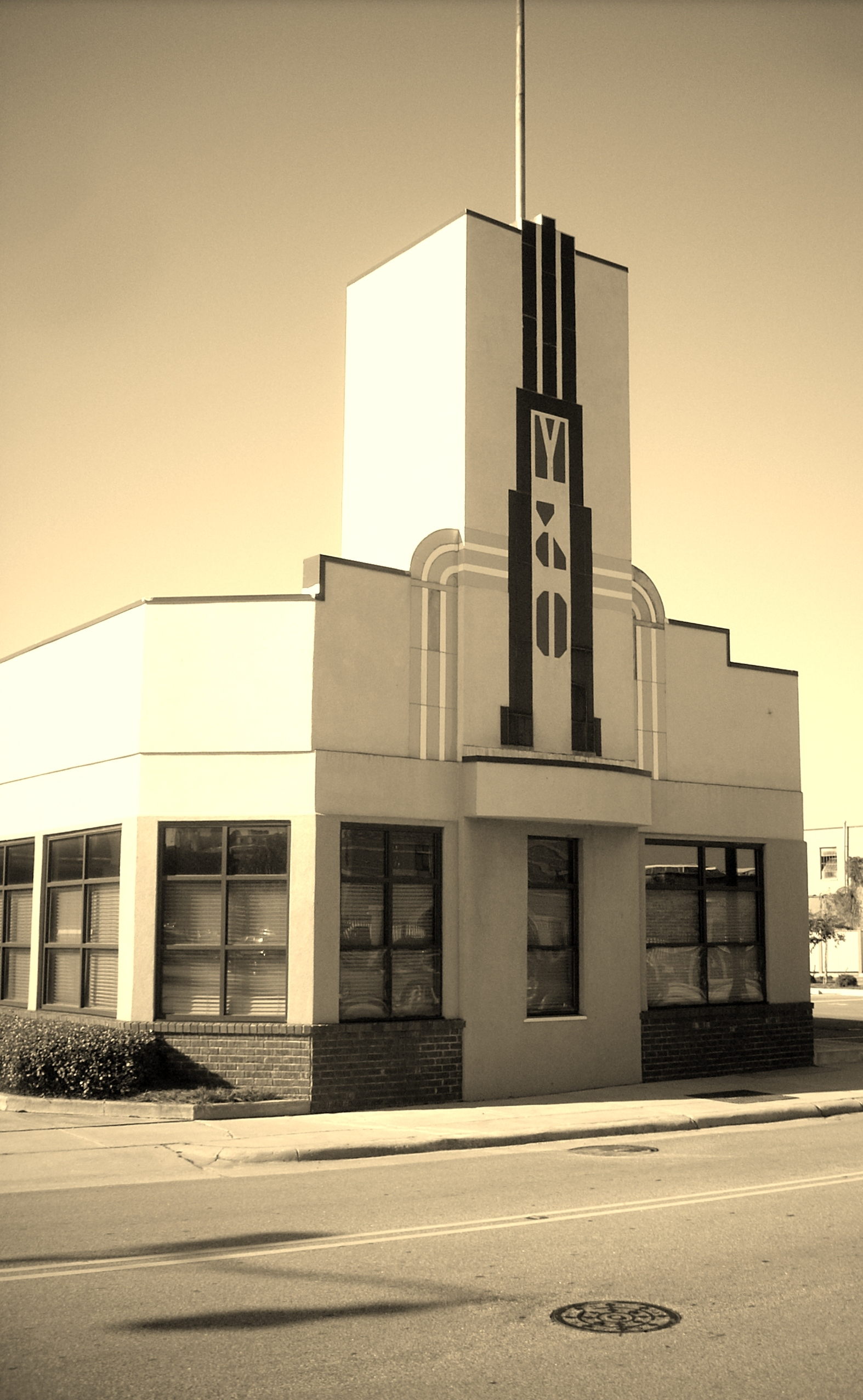
M & O Chevrolet, Fayetteville

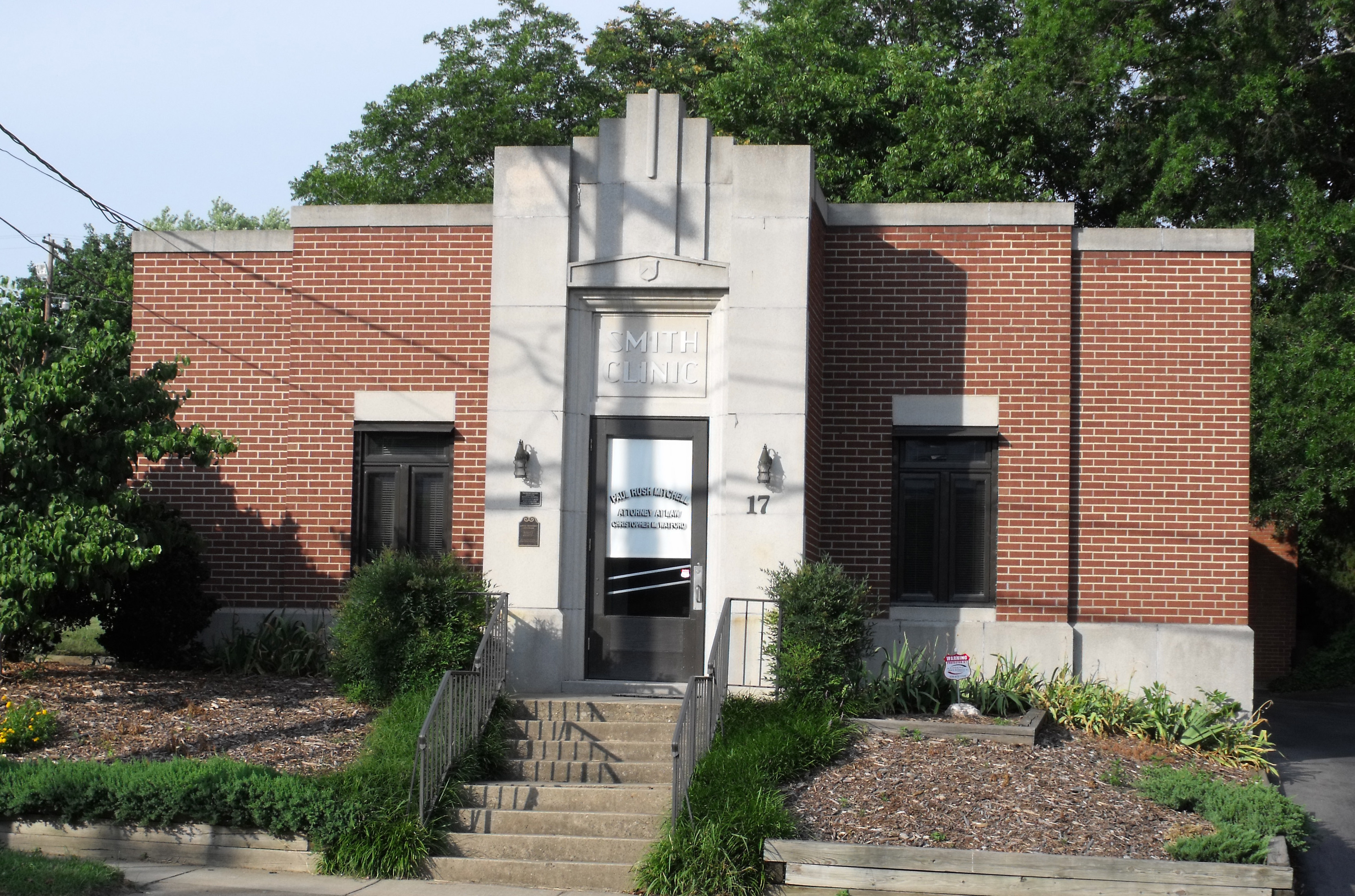
Smith Clinic, Thomasville

== Other cities ==
- Atlantic Bank and Trust Company Building, Burlington, 1928
- B&S Department Store, Downtown Wake Forest Historic District, Wake Forest, 1894 and 1949
- Belmont Junior High (former Belmont High School), Belmont Historic District, Belmont, 1939
- Ben's of Wake Forest Building, Downtown Wake Forest Historic District, Wake Forest, 1940
- Bladen County Recreation Center (former Gymnasium), Elizabethtown, 1940
- City Hall (former United States Post Office and Federal Building), Reidsville Historic District, Reidsville, 1926
- City Hall, Marion, 1937
- City Hall, Williamston Commercial Historic District, Williamston, 1960
- Co-Ed Cinema, Brevard, 1939
- County Armory, Eden, 1939
- Davis Sisters Building, Main Street Historic District, Forest City, 1932
- DeHart Building, Leaksville Commercial Historic District. Eden, 1930
- Don Gibson Theater, Shelby, 1939
- Enterprise Building, High Point, 1935
- Esso Gas Station, Four Oaks Commercial Historic District, Four Oaks, 1957
- Fire Department Headquarters, Goldsboro, 1939
- Garrou-Morganton Full-Fashioned Hosiery Mills, Morganton, 1927–1928
- Gem Theater, Kannapolis, 1936
- Gibson Theatre, Laurinburg Commercial Historic District, Laurinburg, 1940
- Graham Cinema, Graham, 1933
- Griffin Theatre, West Main Street Historic District, Forest City, 1948
- Hosiery Mill (former Dexdale Hosiery Company), Penderlea Homesteads Historic District, Willard, 1938
- Howell Theatre, Downtown Smithfield Historic District, Smithfield, 1935
- Joy Lee Apartment Building and Annex, Carolina Beach, 1945
- Kirby Cultural Arts Complex (former Kirby Theatre), Roxboro Commercial Historic District, Roxboro, 1949
- Lawsonville Avenue Elementary School, Reidsville, 1935
- Lexington Memorial Hospital, Lexington, 1946
- Liberty Theatre, Downtown Main Street Historic District, North Wilkesboro, 1946
- M & O Chevrolet Company, Fayetteville, 1937
- Masonic Temple Building, Shelby, 1924
- Mimosa Theatre, Morganton Downtown Historic District, Morganton, 1939
- Municipal Building (former Gabriel Johnston Hotel), Downtown Smithfield Historic District, Smithfield, 1937
- North Wilkesboro Police Department (former Town Hall), Downtown Main Street Historic District, North Wilkesboro, 1939
- Old Wilkesboro Municipal Building, Downtown Wilkesboro Historic District, Wilkesboro, 1930s
- O'Neil Building, Henderson Central Business Historic District, Henderson, 1885 and 1929
- Orpheum Theatre, Oxford, 1942
- Paramount Theatre, Farmville Historic District, Farmville, 1919 and 1933
- Parkway Theater, West Jefferson Historic District, West Jefferson, 1939
- Pepsi Bottling Company, West Selma Historic District, Selma, 1935
- Plymouth Theatre, Plymouth Historic District, Plymouth, 1937
- Police Department Building (former City Hall), Thomasville, 1938
- Rose's Dime Store Building, Canton Main Street Historic District, Canton, 1930
- Roxy Theatre (now a hardware store), Old Fort Commercial Historic District, Old Fort, 1946
- Salisbury Building, Salisbury, 1928
- Sampson Community Theatre (former Clinton Theatre), Clinton Commercial Historic District, Clinton, 1950
- Siler City High School, Siler City, 1922
- Smith Clinic, Thomasville, 1939
- Starnes Jewelers, Albemarle, 1920s
- Temple Theatre, Sanford, 1925
- Turnage Building, Ayden Historic District, Ayden, 1947
- United States Post Office, Burlington, 1936
- United States Post Office and Federal Building, Rockingham, 1936
- Watkins Building/Parker Drugstore, Henderson Central Business Historic District, Henderson, 1885 and 1930s
- Wilson Habitat Store (former Lovelace Motor Company), Wilson Central Business–Tobacco Warehouse Historic District, Wilson, 1937
- Wilson Municipal Building, Wilson, 1935
- WPTF Radio Transmitter, Cary, 1934
- Yancey Country Schools District Office (former Gymnasium), Burnsville, 1930s

== See also ==
- List of Art Deco architecture
- List of Art Deco architecture in the United States
