= Queen–Gordon Streets Historic District =

Historic district in North Carolina, United States

- U.S. National Register of Historic Places
- U.S. Historic district
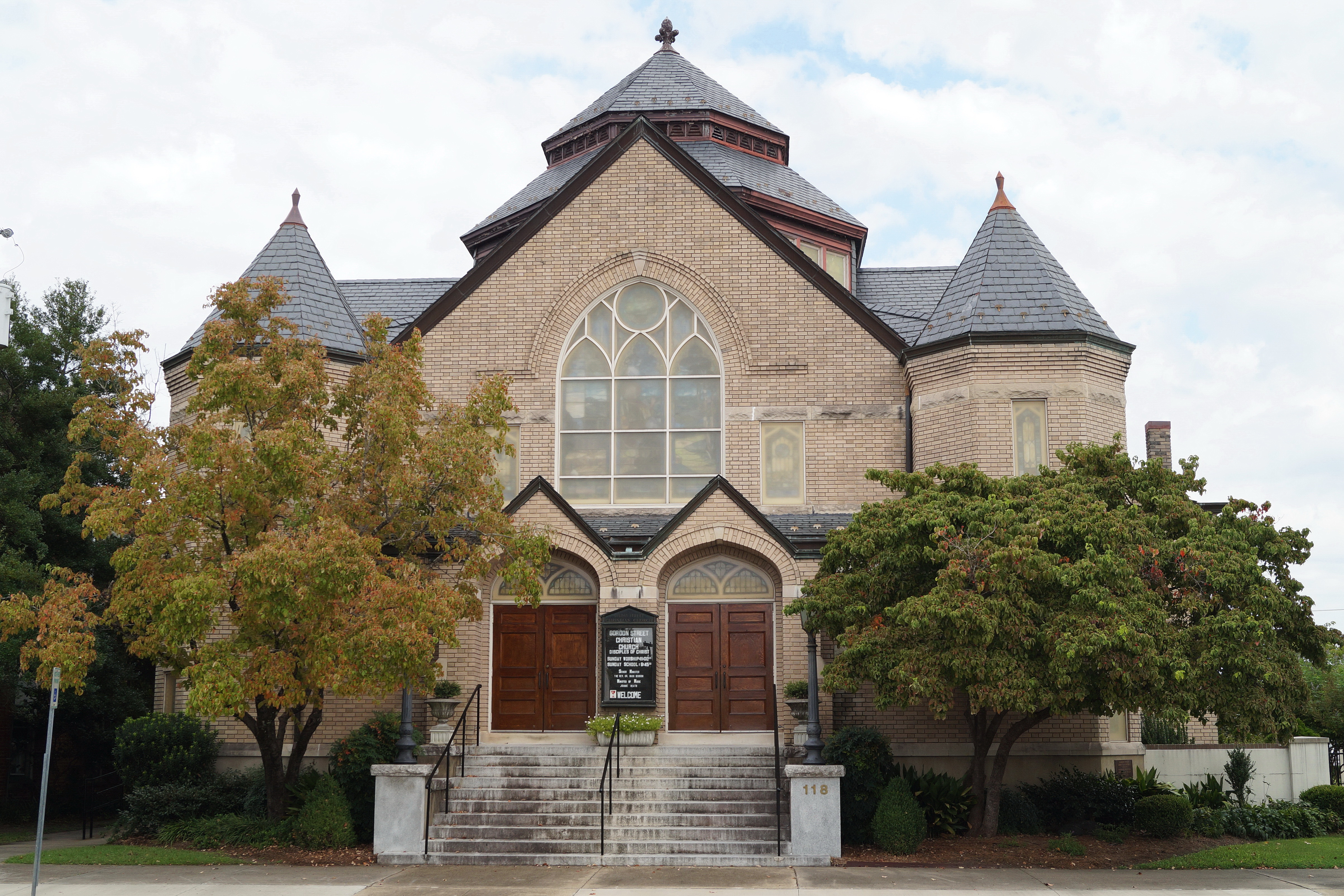
- Gordon Street Christian Church, Queen–Gordon Streets Historic District, September 2014

- Location within North Carolina Location within the United States
- Location: Roughly N. Queen and Gordon Sts., Kinston, North Carolina
- Coordinates: 35°15′43″N 77°34′52″W
- Area: 7 acres (2.8 ha)
- Built: 1895
- Architect: Benton & Benton; Blalock, Robert L.
- Architectural style: Classical Revival, Beaux Arts, Romanesque
- MPS: Kinston MPS
- NRHP reference No.: 89001765
- Added to NRHP: November 8, 1989

Queen–Gordon Streets Historic District is a national historic district located at Kinston, Lenoir County, North Carolina. It encompasses 20 contributing buildings in a mixed commercial and industrial section of Kinston. The buildings include notable examples of Classical Revival, Beaux-Arts, and Romanesque style architecture and date between 1895 and the mid-1930s. Notable buildings include the Gordon Street Christian Church (1912-1915), (former) U. S. Post Office/Federal Building (1915), Citizens / First National Bank Building (1903), (former) Farmers and Merchants Bank (1924), Canady Building (1899), and the LaRoque and Hewitt Building (c. 1900).

It was listed on the National Register of Historic Places in 1989. The Kinston Commercial Historic District is considered a boundary increase to the Queen–Gordon Streets Historic District.
