= Pitt County Courthouse =

Historic courthouse in North Carolina, US

- U.S. National Register of Historic Places
- U.S. Historic district – Contributing property
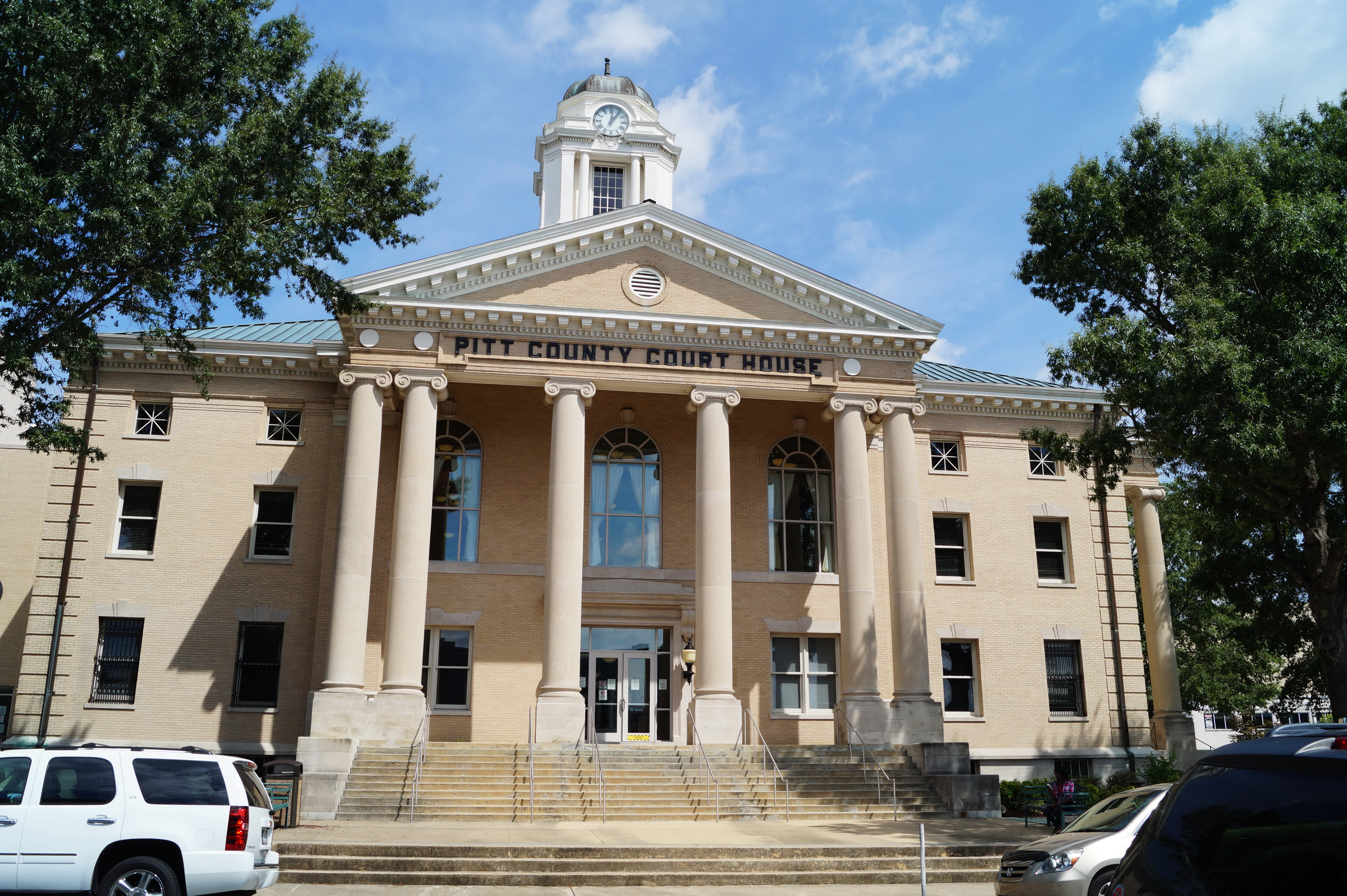
- Pitt County Courthouse, September 2014

- Location within North Carolina Location within the United States
- Location: N. 3rd St. between Washington and S. Evan St., Greenville, North Carolina
- Coordinates: 35°36′49″N 77°22′23″W
- Area: less than one acre
- Built: 1910
- Architect: Milburn, Heister & Company
- Architectural style: Classical Revival
- MPS: North Carolina County Courthouses TR
- NRHP reference No.: 79001745
- Added to NRHP: May 10, 1979

Pitt County Courthouse is a historic courthouse building located at Greenville, Pitt County, North Carolina. It was designed and built in 1910 by the architectural firm of Milburn, Heister & Company, and is a three-story, rectangular, Classical Revival style tan brick building. The front facade features a tetrastyle Ionic order portico, a hipped roof, and dominating three-stage cupola.

It was added to the National Register of Historic Places in 1979. It is located in the Greenville Commercial Historic District.

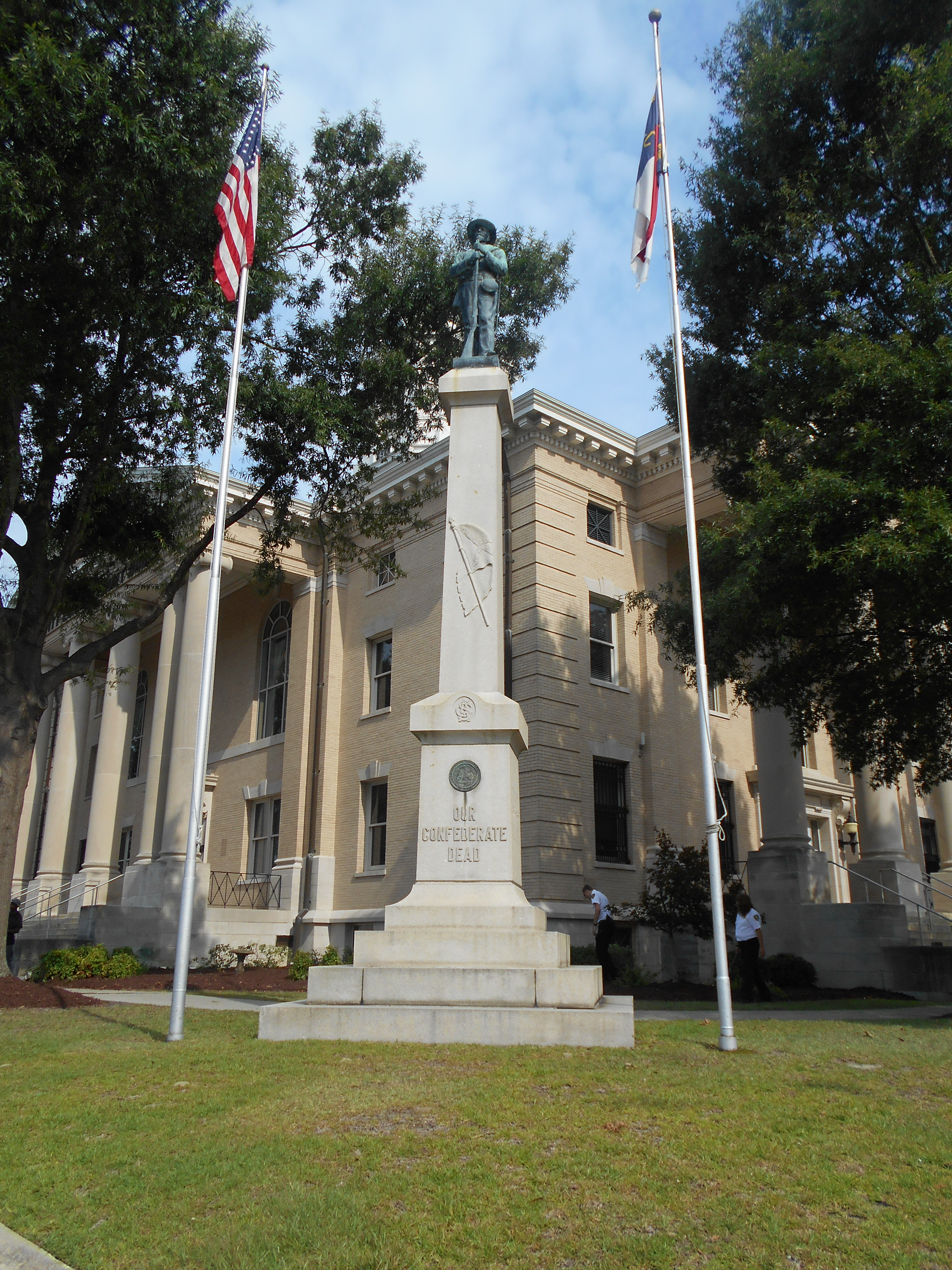
Confederate statue in front of courthouse
