= Joy Lee Apartment Building and Annex =

- U.S. National Register of Historic Places
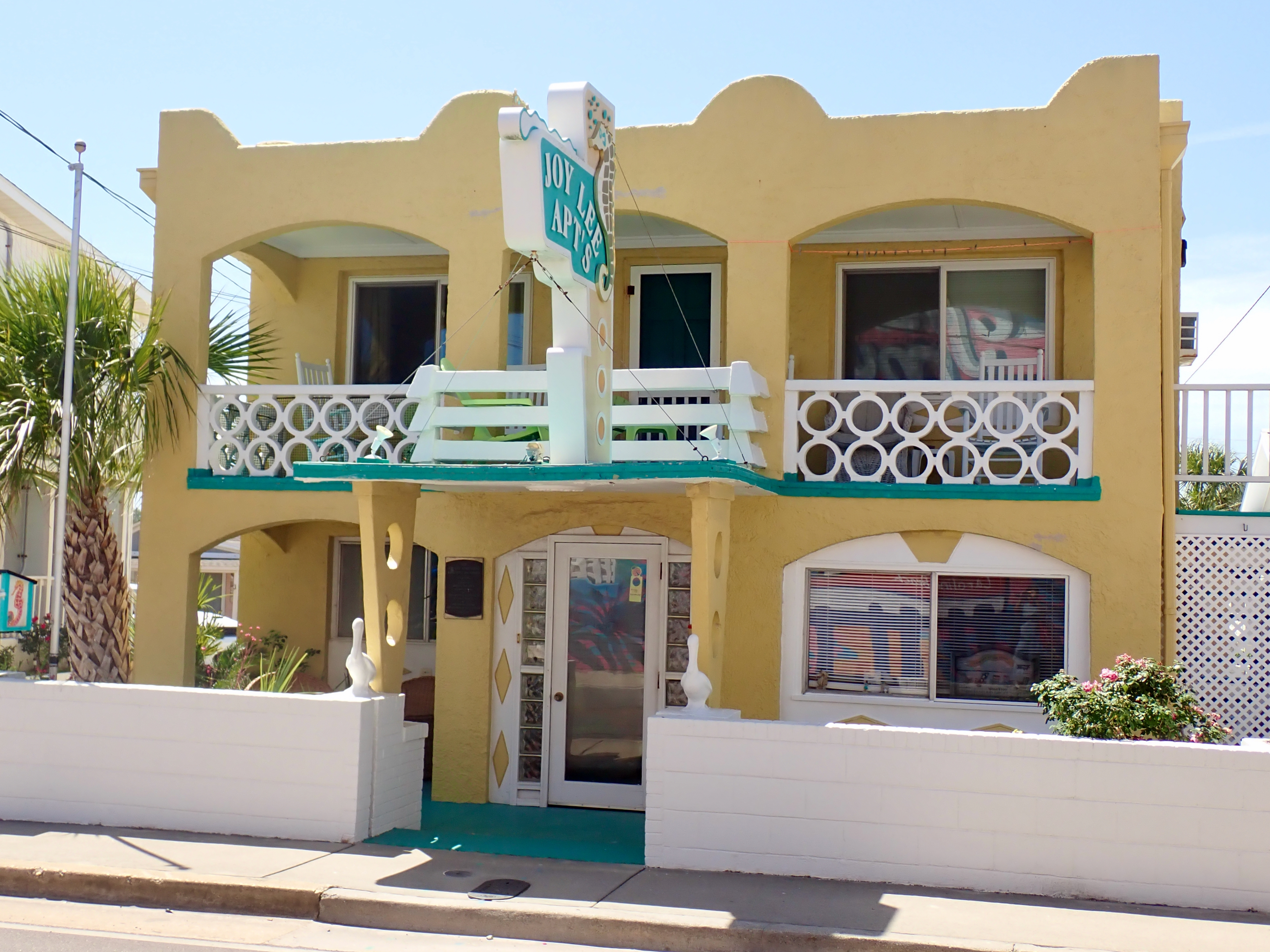
- Front of Joy Lee Apartment Building

- Location within North Carolina
- Location: 317 Carolina Beach Ave., N., Carolina Beach, North Carolina
- Coordinates: 34°2′14″N 77°53′30″W
- Area: less than one acre
- Built: 1945, 1948
- Architect: Lewis, Grover L.; Bordeaux, William W.
- Architectural style: Modern Movement, Art Deco
- NRHP reference No.: 97000256
- Added to NRHP: April 3, 1997

Joy Lee Apartment Building and Annex is a historic apartment building located at Carolina Beach, New Hanover County, North Carolina. The original building was built in 1945, and is a two-story, double-pile concrete block building covered with stucco. It features fanciful concrete balustrades and walls, and an Art Deco-inspired centered portico over the front entryway added in 1957. A two-story double-pile Modern Movement-style annex comprising four apartments was built in 1948.

It was listed on the National Register of Historic Places in 1997.

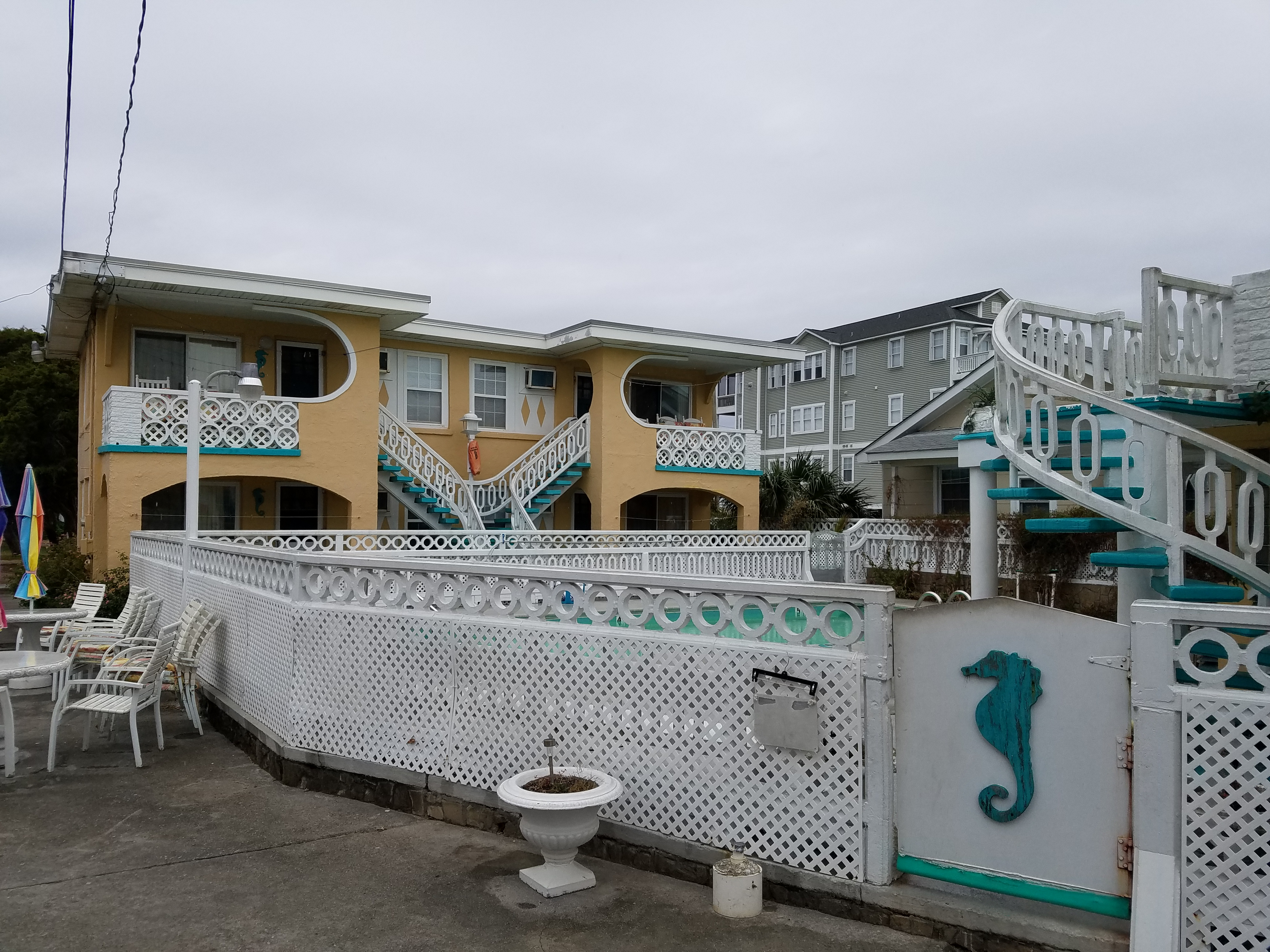
Rear annex of building
