= Carolina Power and Light Company Car Barn and Automobile Garage =

Historic building in North Carolina, US

- U.S. National Register of Historic Places
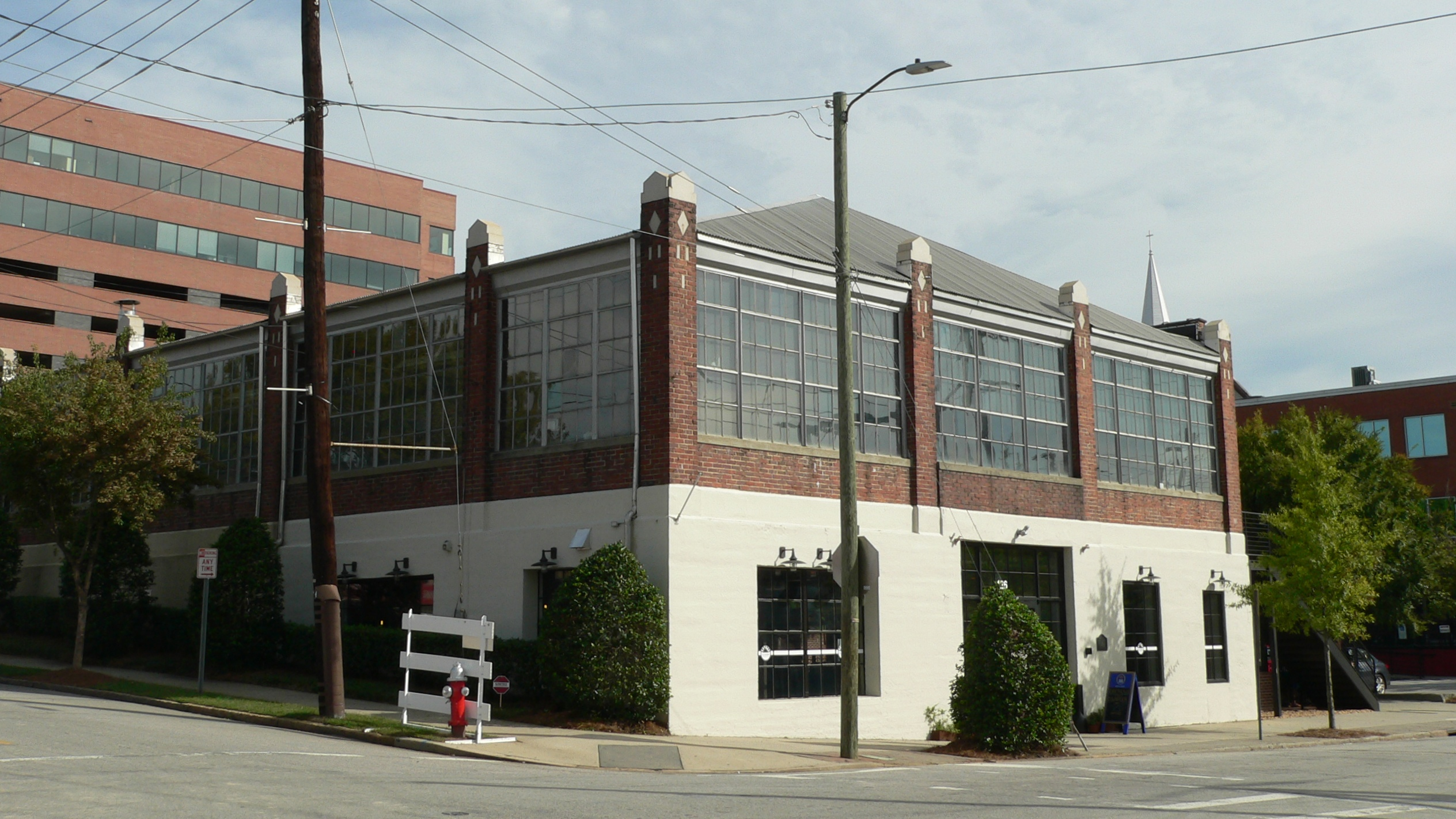
- Carolina Power and Light Company Car Barn and Automobile Garage, September 2014

- Location within North Carolina Location within the United States
- Location: 126 N. West St., Raleigh, North Carolina
- Coordinates: 35°46′56″N 78°38′44″W
- Area: less than one acre
- Built: 1925
- Architectural style: Art Deco
- NRHP reference No.: 97001304
- Added to NRHP: October 30, 1997

Carolina Power and Light Company Car Barn and Automobile Garage is a historic streetcar barn and automobile repair shop located at Raleigh, North Carolina. It built in 1925 and is a one-story, rectangular brick building in the Art Deco style. It measures 210 feet and 6 inches in length and 59 feet and 7 inches in width and features terra cotta ornamentation. The building was originally built to house the Carolina Power and Light Company's electric streetcars and buses and was converted to automotive and service vehicle storage in the 1940s.

It was listed on the National Register of Historic Places in 1997.
