= Clark and Sorrell Garage =

- U.S. National Register of Historic Places
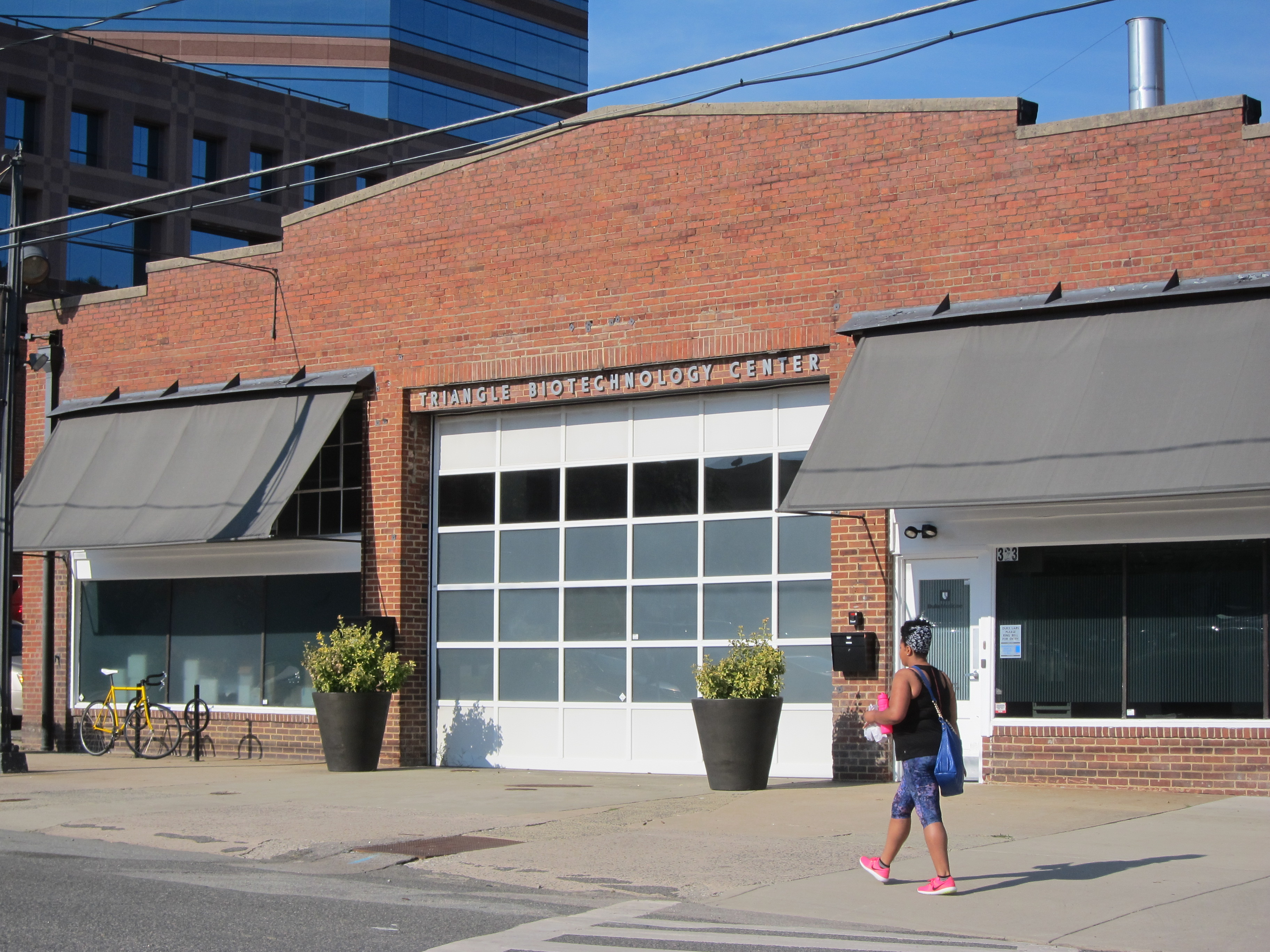

- Location within North Carolina Location within the United States
- Location: 323 Foster St. Durham, North Carolina
- Coordinates: 36°0′3″N 78°54′47″W
- Area: 0.6 acres (0.24 ha)
- Built: 1932, c. 1941
- Built by: Cole, Jesse
- Architectural style: Early Commercial
- NRHP reference No.: 00000991
- Added to NRHP: August 16, 2000

Clark and Sorrell Garage is a historic automobile repair shop located at Durham, Durham County, North Carolina. It was built in 1932, and is a one-story brick building, three bays wide and four bays deep, with a flat tar and gravel roof. It was expanded about 1941 with a seven bay, brick-faced addition. The addition features an Art Moderne style entrance with a stuccoed surround. Attached to the garage is a two-story office building. It is the oldest auto repair garage still in operation in the city.

It was listed on the National Register of Historic Places in 2000.
