= Greenville Commercial Historic District (Greenville, North Carolina) =

Historic district in North Carolina, United States

- U.S. National Register of Historic Places
- U.S. Historic district
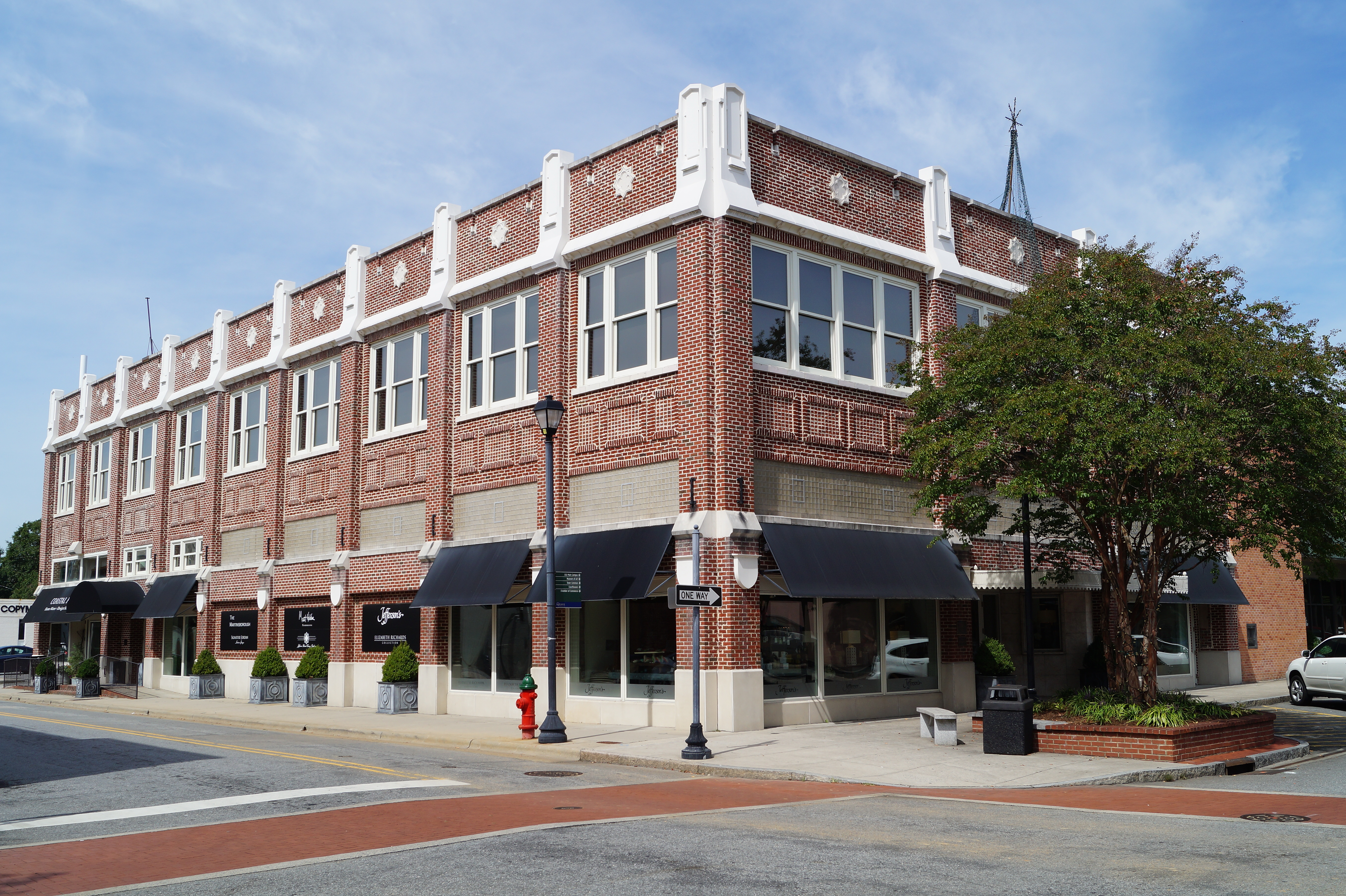
- Blount-Harvey Department Store (1923), Greenville Commercial Historic District, September 2014

- Location within North Carolina Location within the United States
- Location: Roughly bounded by West Third, South Evans and East and West Fifth Sts., Greenville, North Carolina
- Coordinates: 35°36′42″N 77°22′23″W
- Area: 25 acres (10 ha)
- Built: 1914
- Architect: Milburn, Heister & Company; Riddick, Burwell et al.
- Architectural style: Greek Revival, Queen Anne
- NRHP reference No.: 03000419
- Added to NRHP: August 21, 2003

Greenville Commercial Historic District is a national historic district located at Greenville, Pitt County, North Carolina. The district encompasses 51 contributing buildings in the central business district of Greenville. It includes buildings dated from about 1914 to 1952 and notable examples of Greek Revival and Queen Anne style architecture. Located in the district and listed separately are the Pitt County Courthouse (1911) by Milburn, Heister & Company and U.S. Post Office (1913). Other notable buildings include the Proctor Hotel (1911), Montgomery Ward Department Store (1929), Dail-Hodges Building (1919), Blount Building (1924), Greenville Bank and Trust (c. 1915), Smith Electric Building (c. 1933), Greenville Municipal Building (1929) designed by Benton & Benton, Blount-Harvey Department Store (1923), White's Theater (1914), Charles Greene House (1860), and the Robert Lee Humber House (1895).

It was listed on the National Register of Historic Places in 2003, with a boundary increase in 2009.
