= Royal Baking Company =

- U.S. National Register of Historic Places
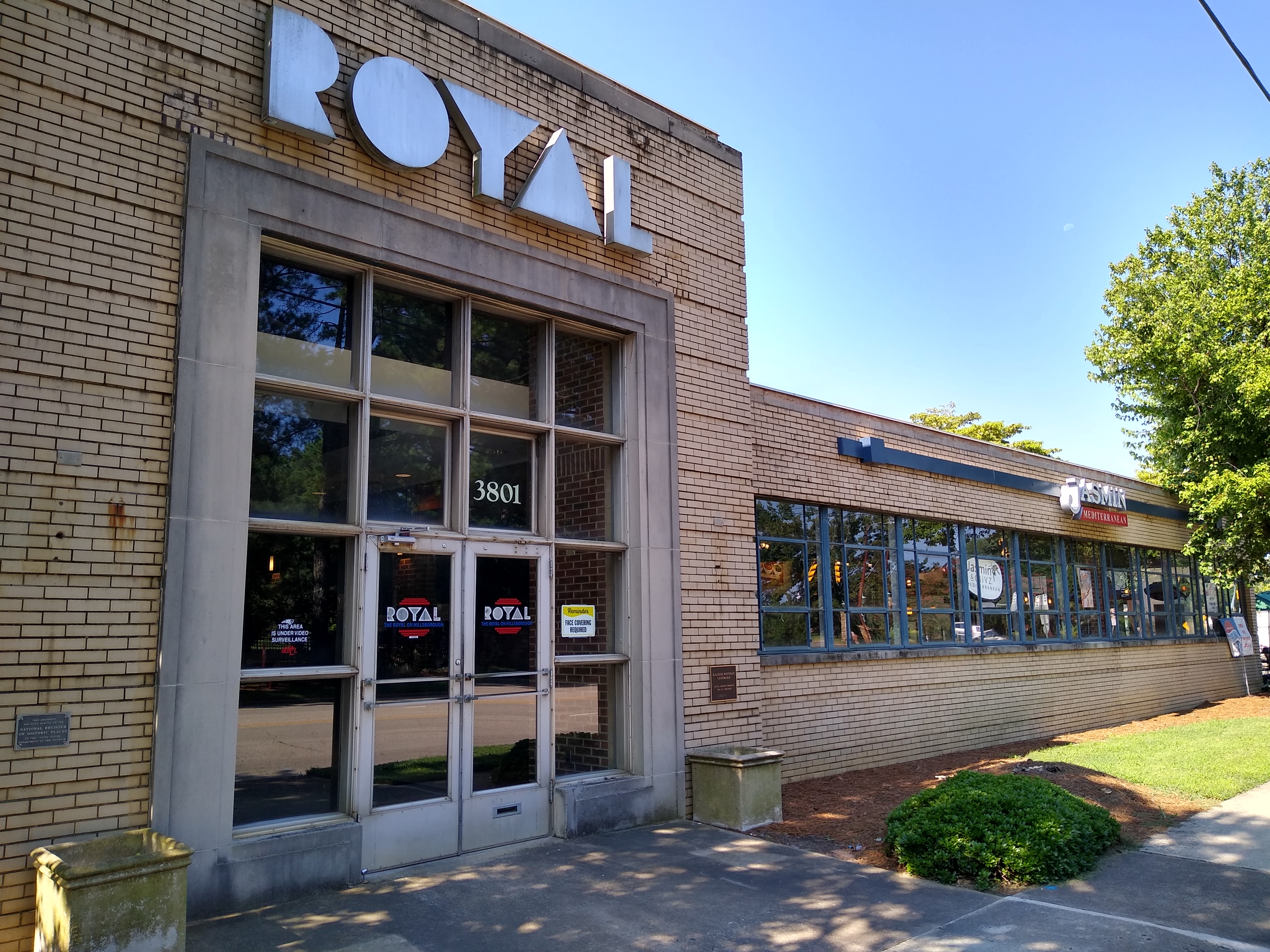

- Location within North Carolina Location within the United States
- Location: 3801 Hillsborough St., Raleigh, North Carolina
- Coordinates: 35°47′38″N 78°41′18″W
- Area: 2.1 acres (0.85 ha)
- Built: 1941, c. 1946-1947, c. 1960
- Built by: Davidson, James A.
- Architect: Long, W.E., Co.
- Architectural style: International Style, Art Deco
- NRHP reference No.: 97001593
- Added to NRHP: December 30, 1997

Royal Baking Company is a historic bakery complex located at Raleigh, North Carolina. The original section was built in 1941, with additions made about 1946–1947, and in the 1960s. The office section is constructed of cinder block with a facing of blond bricks and features corner-wrapping, metal-framed, ribbon windows in the International style. The building also has cylindrical lamps with Art Deco-style metal wall mounts. The building has been converted to a retail complex.

It was listed on the National Register of Historic Places in 1997.
