= Former Charlotte Coca-Cola Bottling Company Plant =

Historic building in North Carolina, US

- Charlotte Coca-Cola Bottling Company Plant, Former
- U.S. National Register of Historic Places
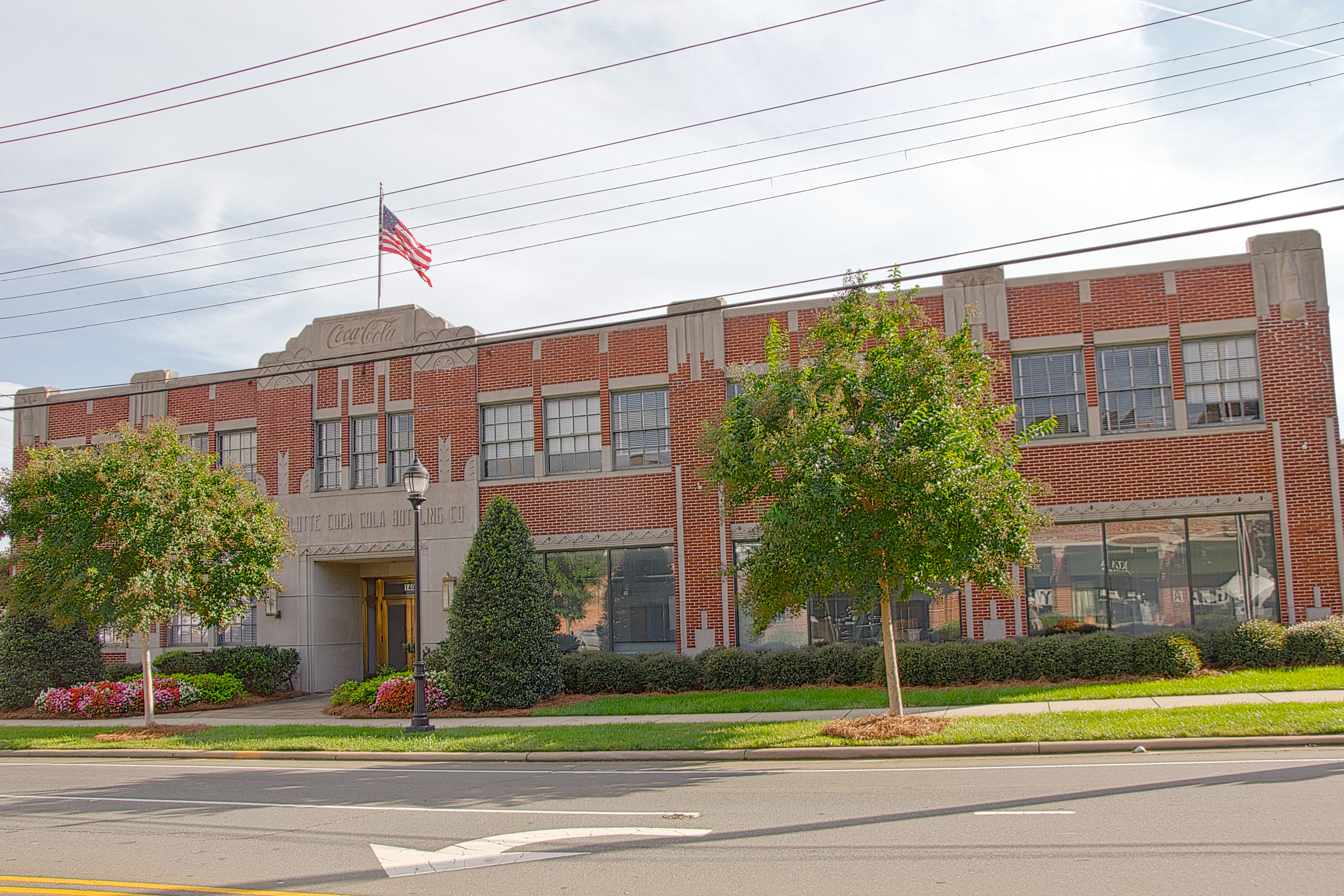
- Former Charlotte Coca-Cola Bottling Company Plant, September 2014

- Location within North Carolina Location within the United States
- Location: 1401-1409 W. Morehead St., Charlotte, North Carolina
- Coordinates: 35°13′43″N 80°51′52″W
- Area: 1.8 acres (0.73 ha)
- Built: 1929-1930
- Architect: Marsh, M.R.
- Architectural style: Art Deco
- NRHP reference No.: 98000157
- Added to NRHP: February 26, 1998

Former Charlotte Coca-Cola Bottling Company Plant is a historic Coca-Cola bottling factory building located at Charlotte, Mecklenburg County, North Carolina. It was built in 1929–1930, and is a two-story, reinforced concrete building with a red brick veneer and decorative concrete detailing and Art Deco design elements. The building has a rectangular plan measuring 110 feet by 185 feet, parapet, and Coca-Cola bottles, sculpted of precast concrete, which crown the corner pilasters.

It was added to the National Register of Historic Places in 1998.
