= Kinston Commercial Historic District =

Historic district in North Carolina, United States

- U.S. National Register of Historic Places
- U.S. Historic district
- Location within North Carolina Location within the United States
- Location: Roughly bounded by E. Blount, W. Blount, N. Herritage, W. North and N. Queen Sts., Kinston, North Carolina
- Coordinates: 35°15′46″N 77°34′50″W
- Area: 21 acres (8.5 ha)
- Built: 1900
- Architect: L. L. Mallard
- Architectural style: Art Deco, Romanesque
- MPS: Kinston MPS
- NRHP reference No.: 94000569
- Added to NRHP: June 3, 1994

Kinston Commercial Historic District is a national historic district located at Kinston, Lenoir County, North Carolina. It encompasses 30 contributing buildings in a mixed commercial and industrial section of Kinston. The district is considered a boundary increase to the previously listed Queen-Gordon Streets Historic District. The buildings include notable examples of Art Deco and Romanesque style architecture and date between 1896 and 1941. Notable buildings include the Carolina Theatre (1935), Cash Supply Store Building (c. 1914), Spence Motor Company Building, and Ellis Carriage Factory (1908-1914).

It was listed on the National Register of Historic Places in 1994.
