= Downtown Greensboro Historic District =

Historic district in North Carolina, United States

- U.S. National Register of Historic Places
- U.S. Historic district
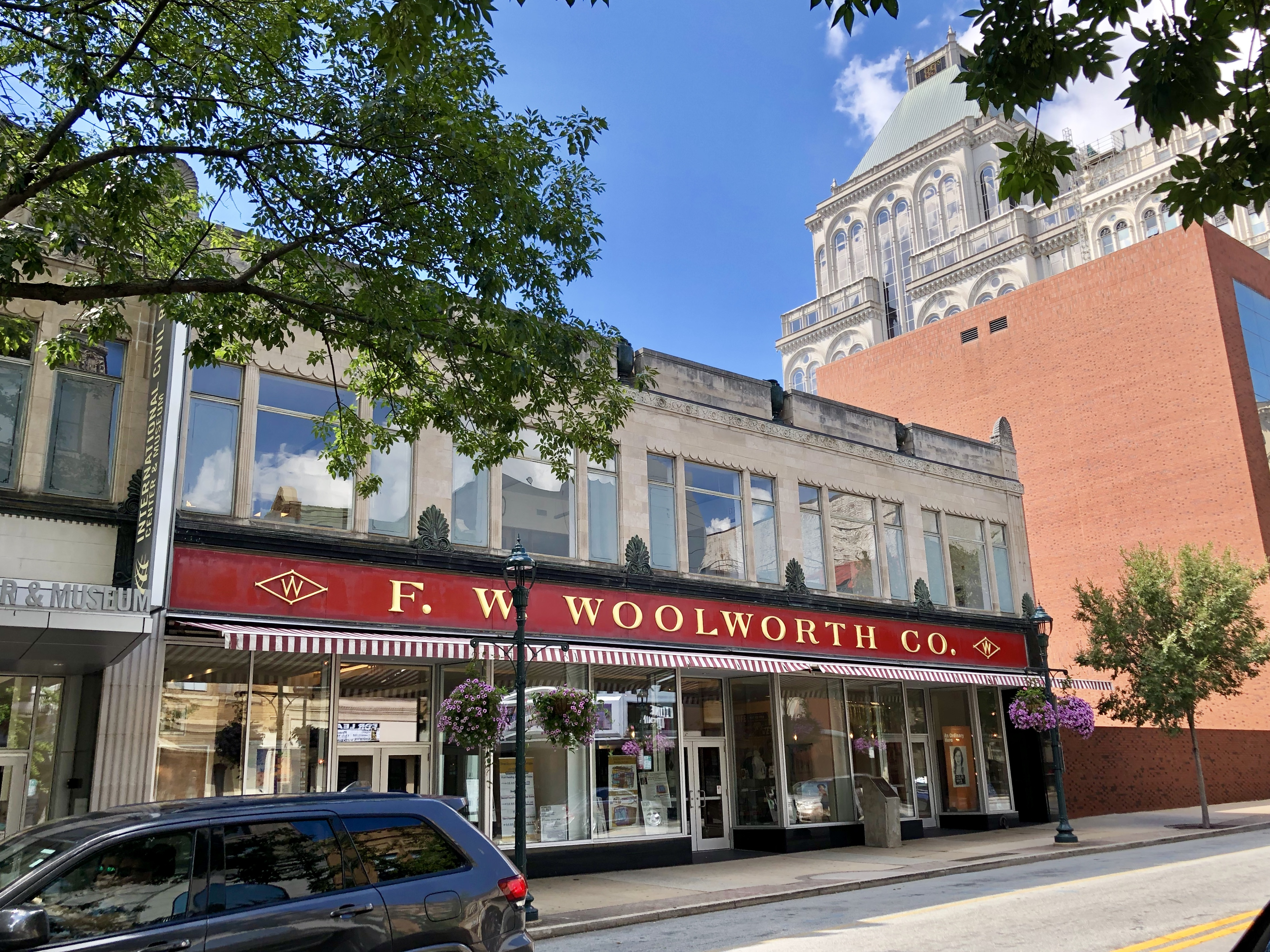
- Former F.W. Woolworth Department Store, September 2019

- Location within North Carolina Location within the United States
- Location: Elm, S. Davie, S. Green, and E. and W. Washington Sts., Greensboro, North Carolina
- Coordinates: 36°04′07″N 79°47′25″W
- Area: 58 acres (23 ha)
- Built: 1885
- Architect: Multiple
- Architectural style: Mixed (more Than 2 Styles From Different Periods)
- NRHP reference No.: 82003458 (original); 100008850 (increase)

Significant dates
- Added to NRHP: June 17, 1982
- Boundary increase: April 20, 2023

Downtown Greensboro Historic District is a national historic district located at Greensboro, Guilford County, North Carolina. When first listed, the district encompassed 96 contributing buildings in the central business district of Greensboro. The commercial buildings were built between about 1885 and the 1930s in a variety of popular architectural styles including Italianate and Art Deco. Located in the district is the separately listed Jefferson Standard Building. Other notable buildings include the Vanstory Building (c. 1885), Kress Building (1929), Woolworth's (c. 1929), Efrid's Department Store (c. 1930), Montgomery Ward (1936), the Carolina Theatre (1927), Center Theatre (1948), the former Belk Building (1939), Ellis Stone/Thalhimer's Department Store (1949-1950), and the former American Exchange National Bank Building (1920). The Woolworth's store is notable as the site of the Greensboro sit-ins of 1960.

It was listed on the National Register of Historic Places in 1982, with a reevaluation in 2003, and boundary adjustments in 2023. The most recent changes included adding city and country government buildings completed by 1975.

== Gallery ==
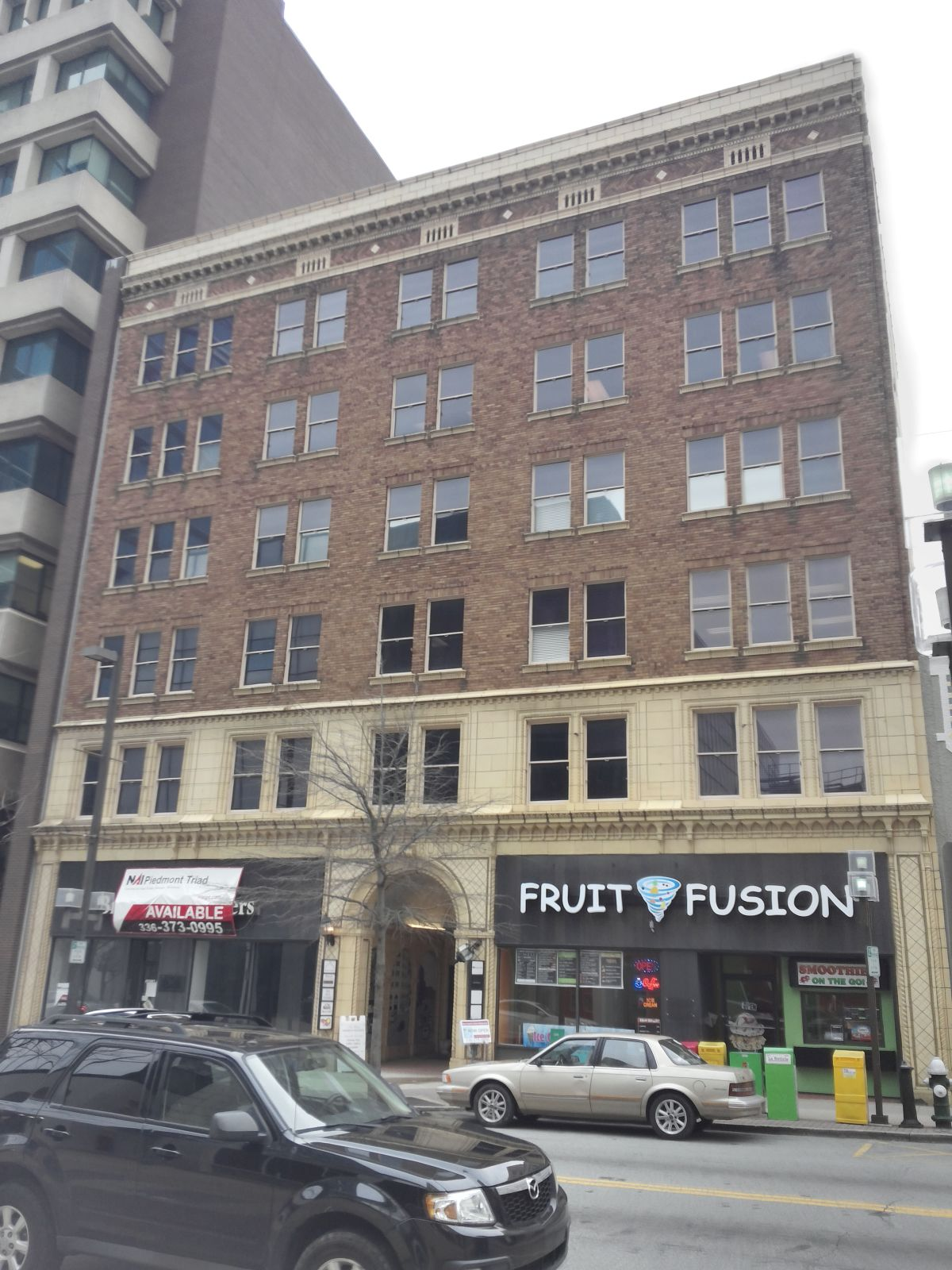
Piedmont Building, 2015

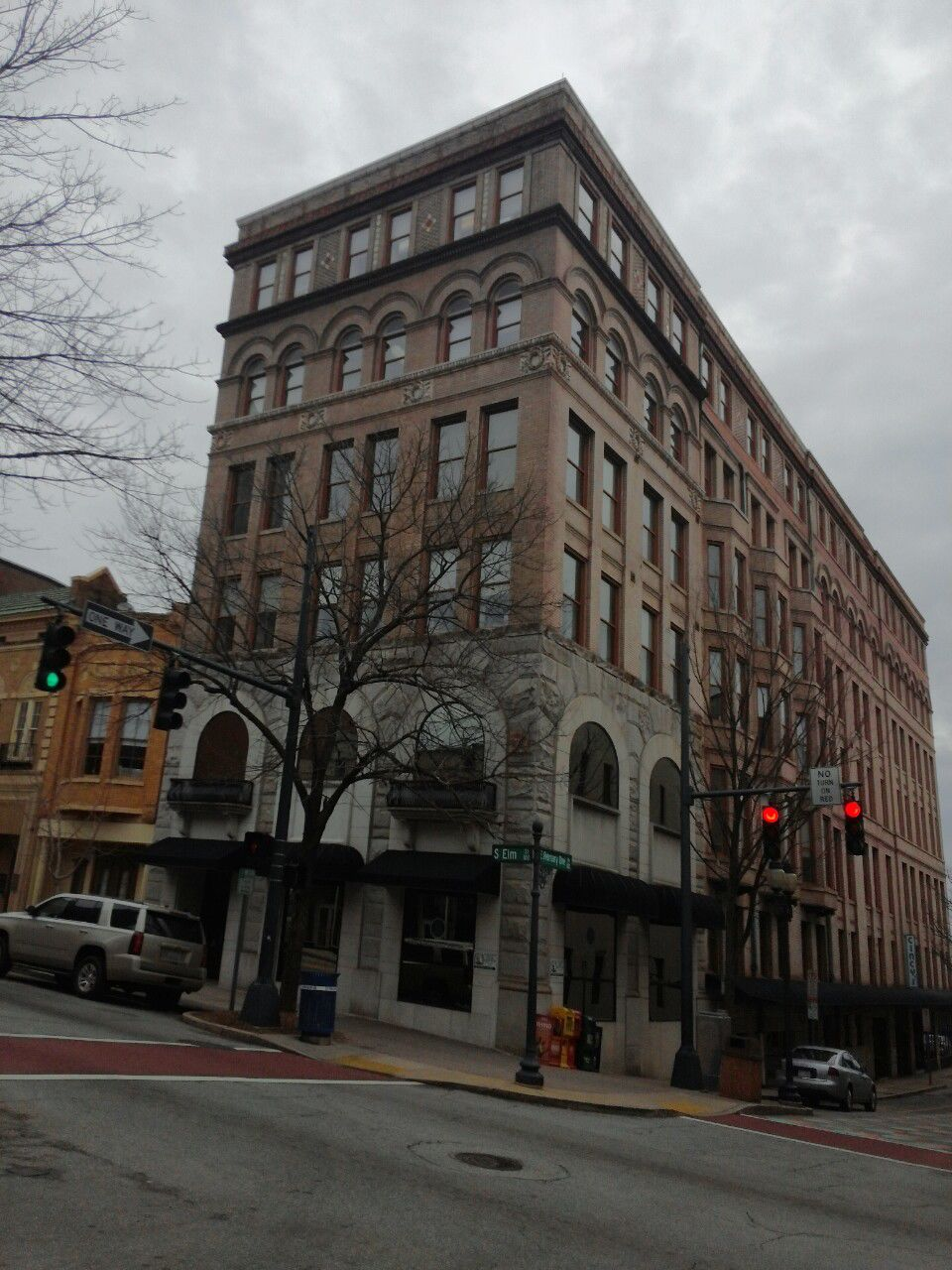
Dixie Fire Insurance Company Building, 2015

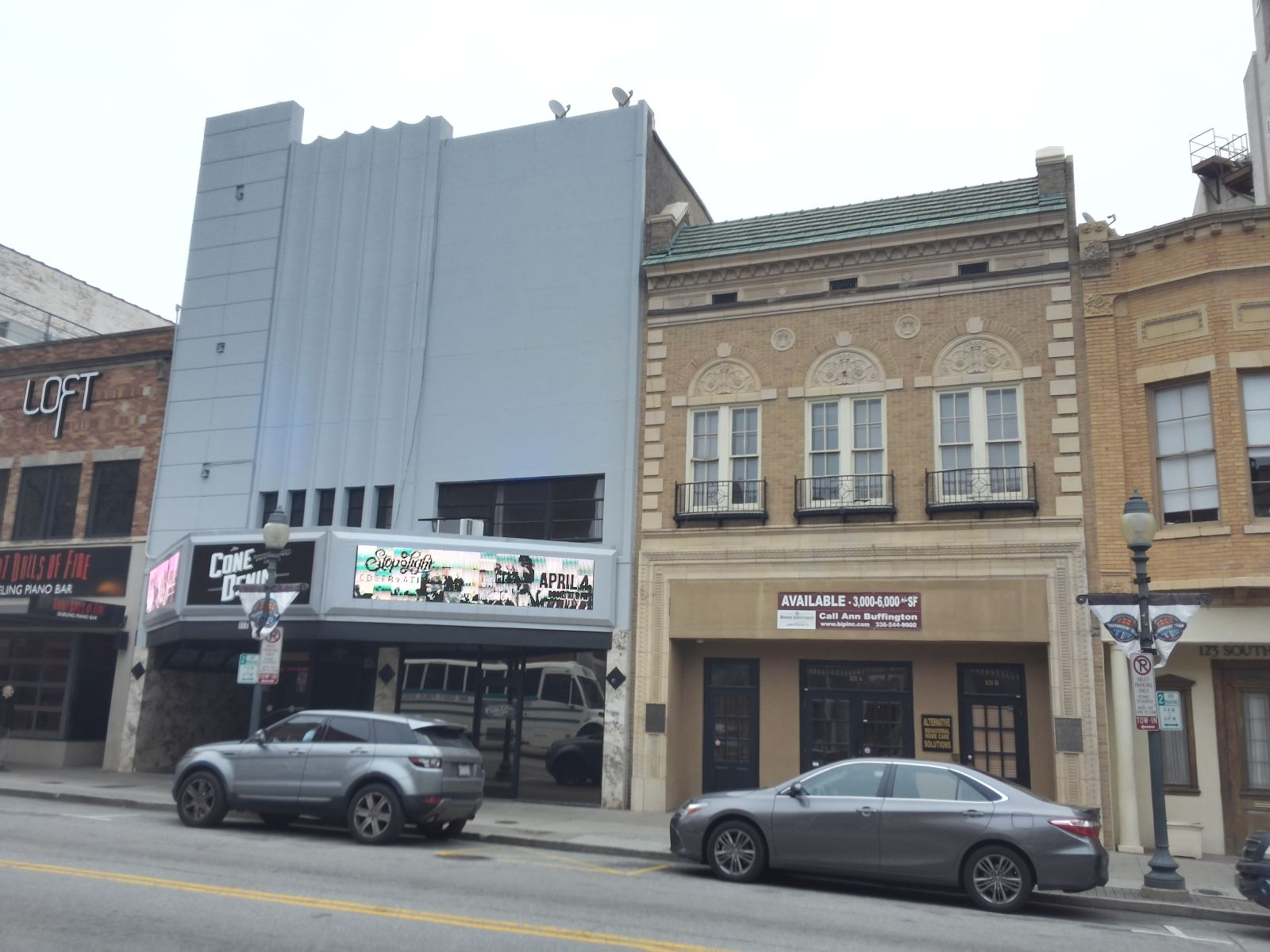
Center Theater & Porter Drug Store, 2015

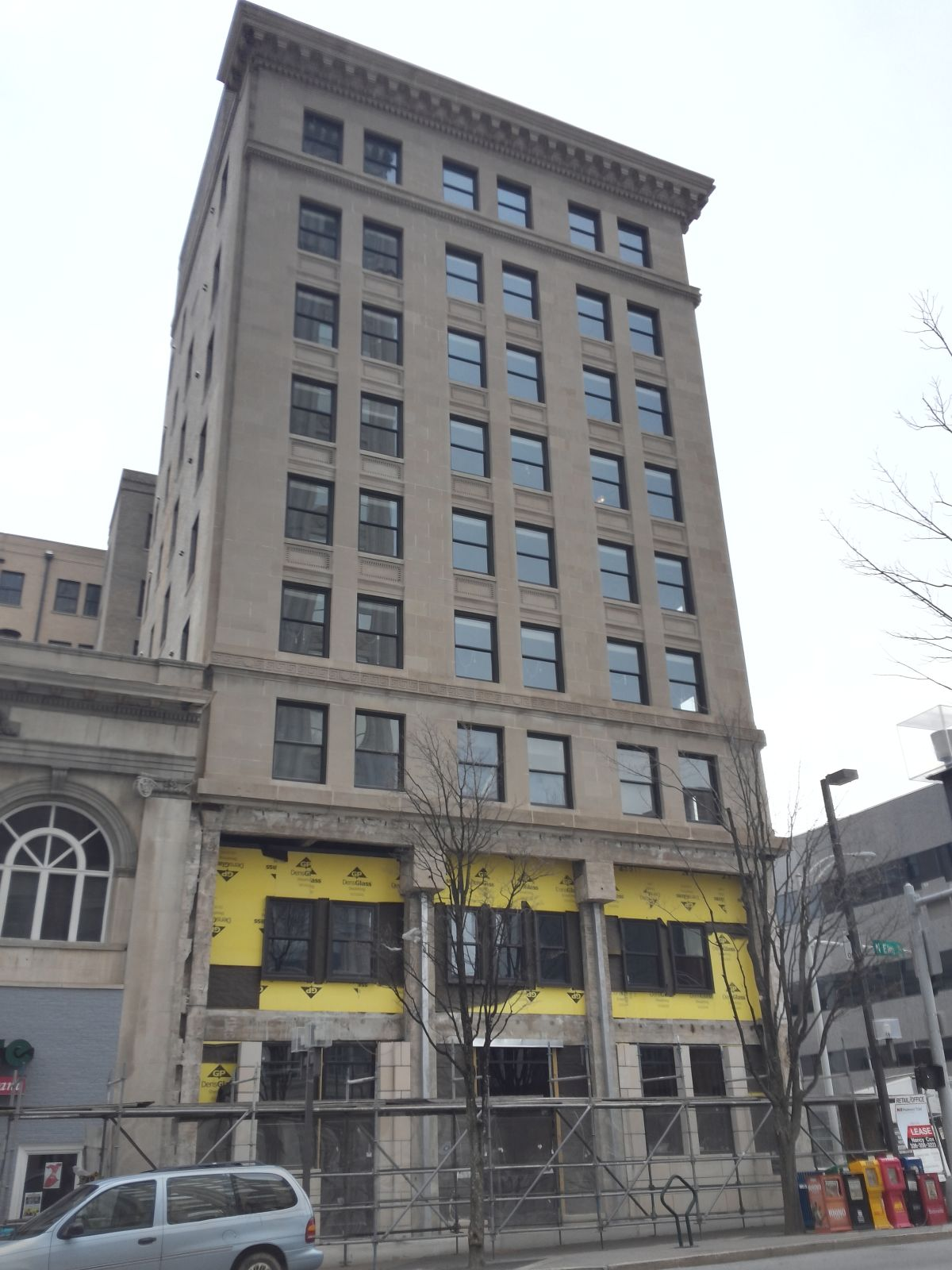
American Exchange National Bank, 2015

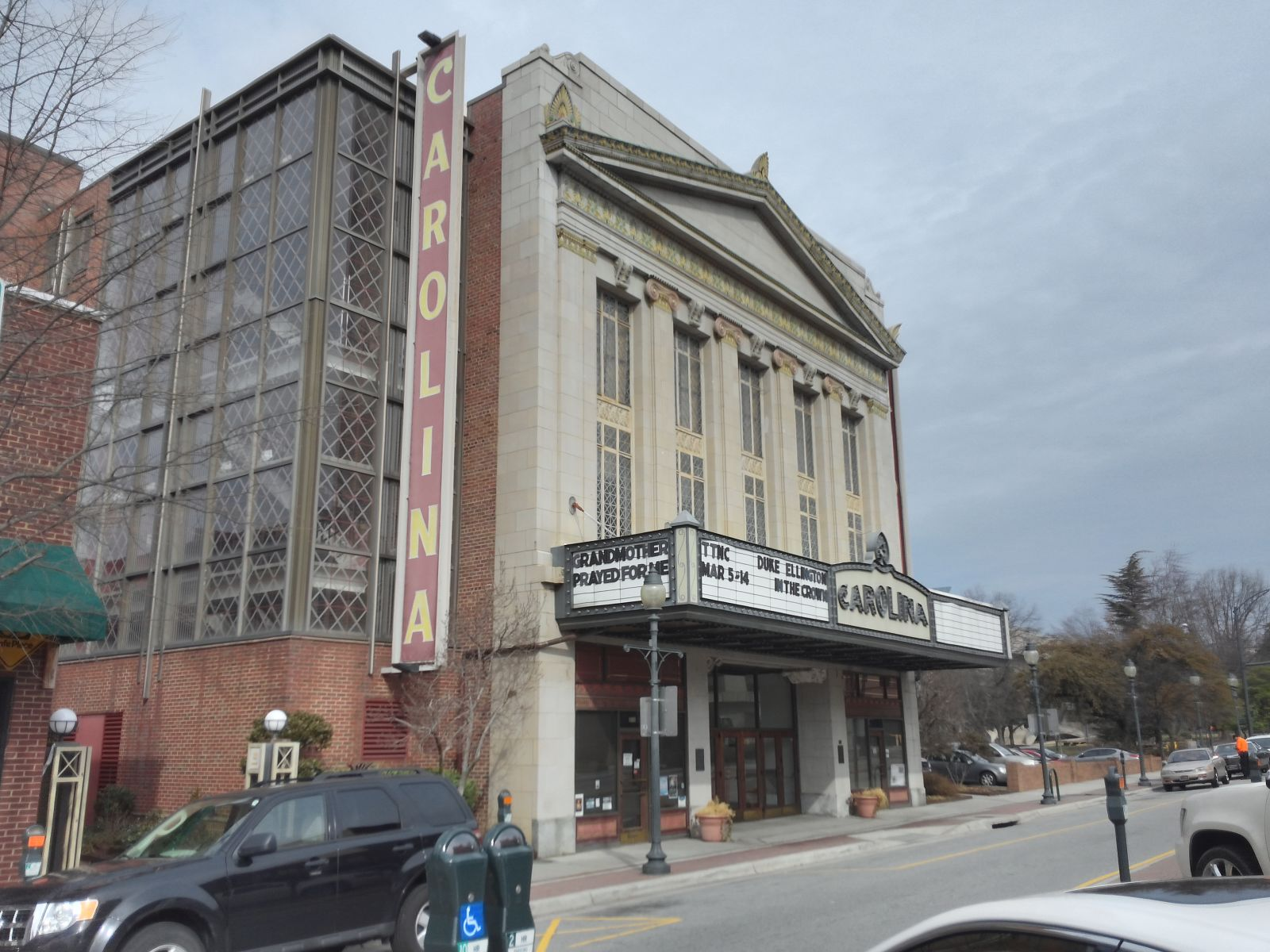
Carolina Theater, 2015

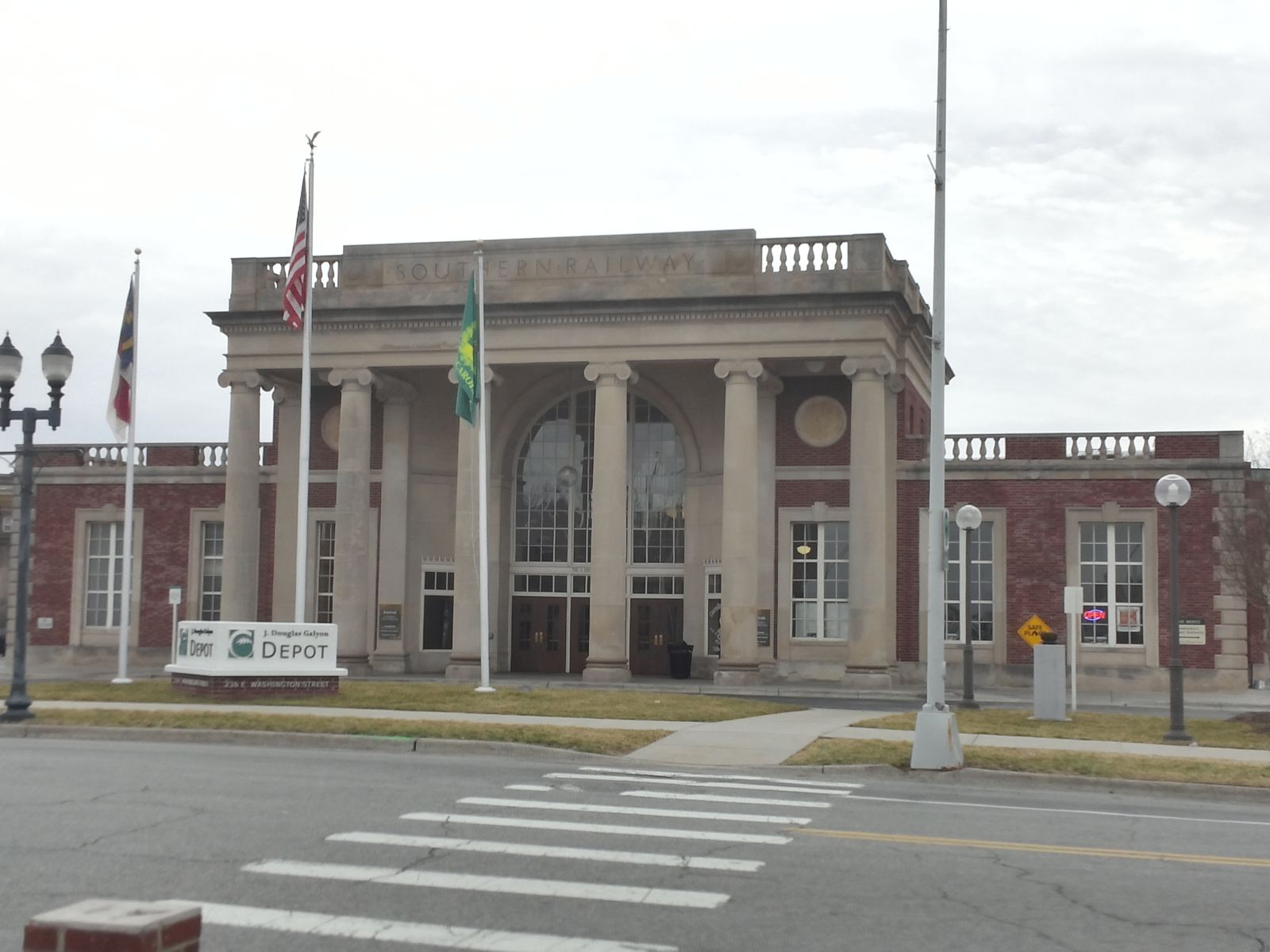
Greensboro Passenger Depot, 2015
