= M & O Chevrolet Company =

Historic building in North Carolina, US

- U.S. National Register of Historic Places
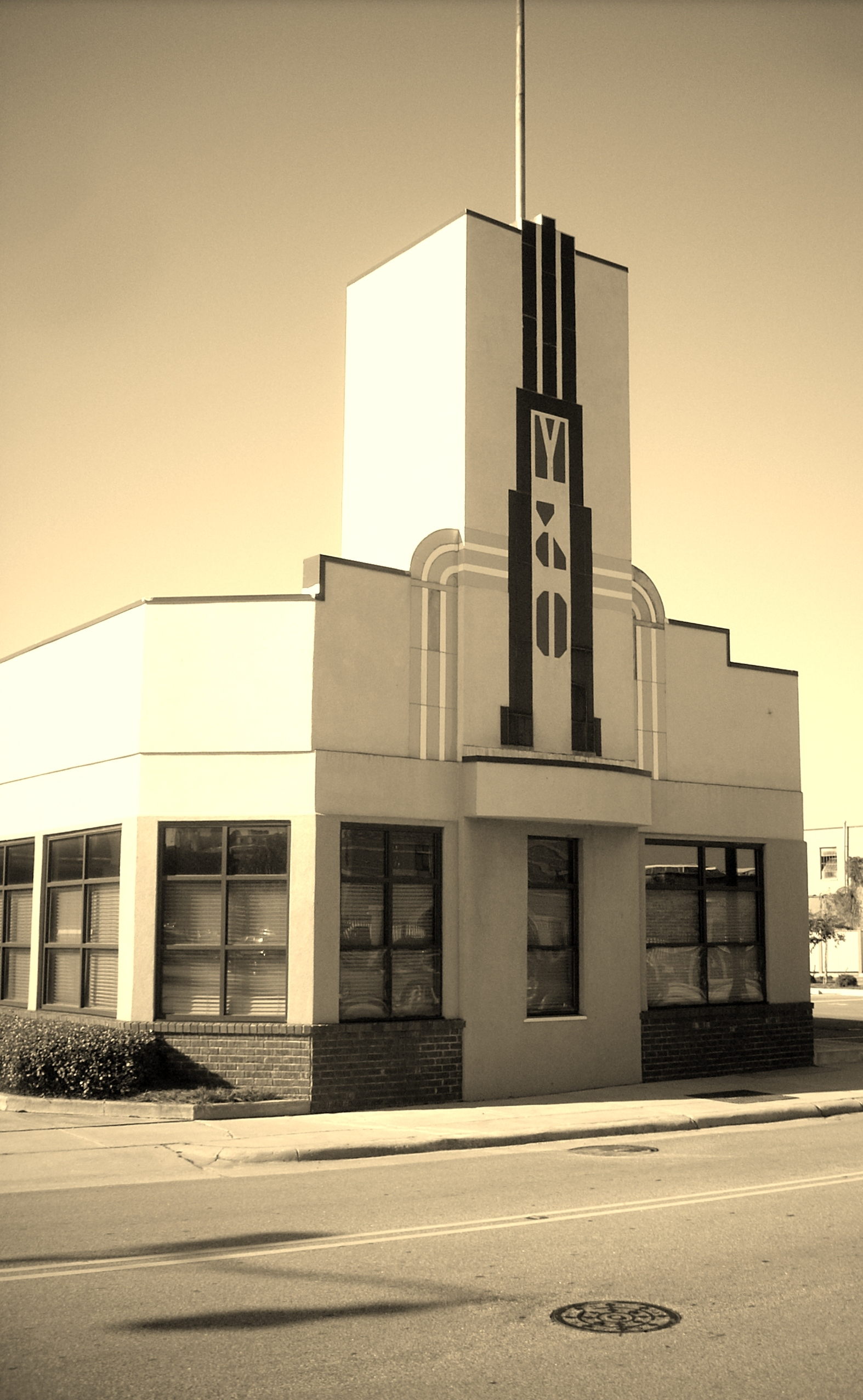
- M & O Chevrolet Company, October 2012

- Location within North Carolina Location within the United States
- Location: 412 W. Russell St., Fayetteville, North Carolina
- Coordinates: 35°3′11″N 78°53′5″W
- Area: 1 acre (0.40 ha)
- Built: 1934-1937
- Built by: Dixon Construction Company
- Architect: Benton, Frank
- Architectural style: Art Deco
- MPS: Fayetteville MRA
- NRHP reference No.: 83001858
- Added to NRHP: July 7, 1983

M & O Chevrolet Company is a historic Chevrolet automobile showroom and service center located at Fayetteville, Cumberland County, North Carolina. It was designed by architect Frank Benton and built between 1934 and 1937. It is a one-story, Art Deco style building. It has an expansive barrel-vaulted service center and features a vertical central tower and stepped roofline.

It was listed on the National Register of Historic Places in 1983.
