= Main Street Commercial Historic District (Hamlet, North Carolina) =

Historic district in North Carolina, United States

- U.S. National Register of Historic Places
- U.S. Historic district
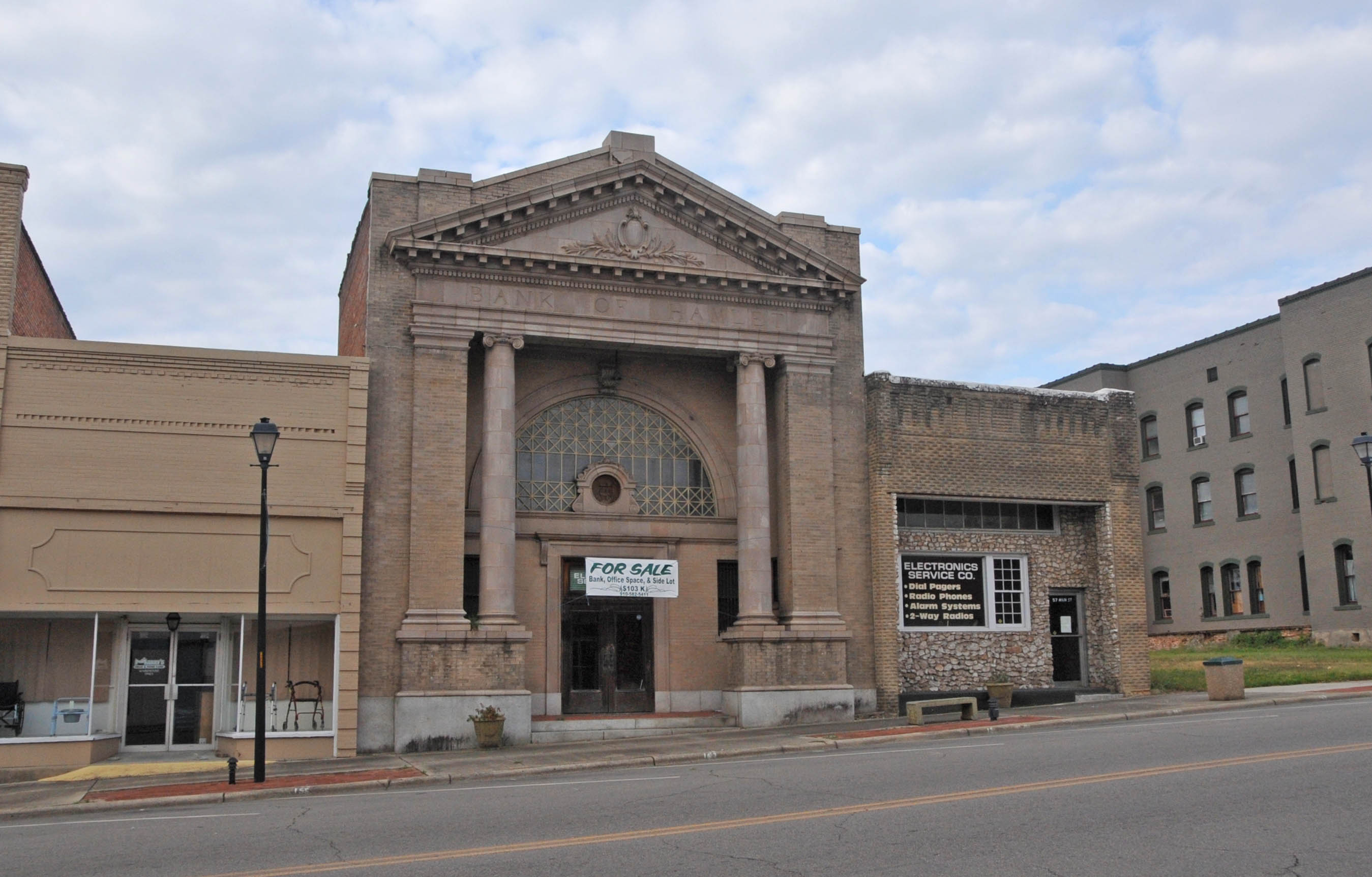
- Bank of Hamlet, Main Street Commercial Historic District, March 2007

- Location within North Carolina Location within the United States
- Location: 2-105 Main St., Hamlet, North Carolina
- Coordinates: 34°53′03″N 79°41′59″W
- Area: 12 acres (4.9 ha)
- Built: c. 1900
- Architectural style: Classical Revival, Art Deco, Queen Anne
- NRHP reference No.: 92000169
- Added to NRHP: March 19, 1992

Main Street Commercial Historic District is a national historic district located at Hamlet, Richmond County, North Carolina. The district encompasses 23 contributing buildings, 3 contributing structures, and 1 contributing object in the central business district of Hamlet. It includes buildings built between about 1900 to about 1940 and notable examples of Queen Anne, Art Deco, and Classical Revival architecture. Located in the district is the separately listed Seaboard Air Line Passenger Depot. Other notable buildings include the Terminal Hotel (c. 1912), Union Building (c. 1920), the Bank of Hamlet (1912), the Old Hamlet Opera House (1912, 1927), and the U.S. Post Office (1940), a Works Progress Administration project.

It was added to the National Register of Historic Places in 1992.
