= Garrou-Morganton Full-Fashioned Hosiery Mills =

Historic buildings in North Carolina, US

- U.S. National Register of Historic Places
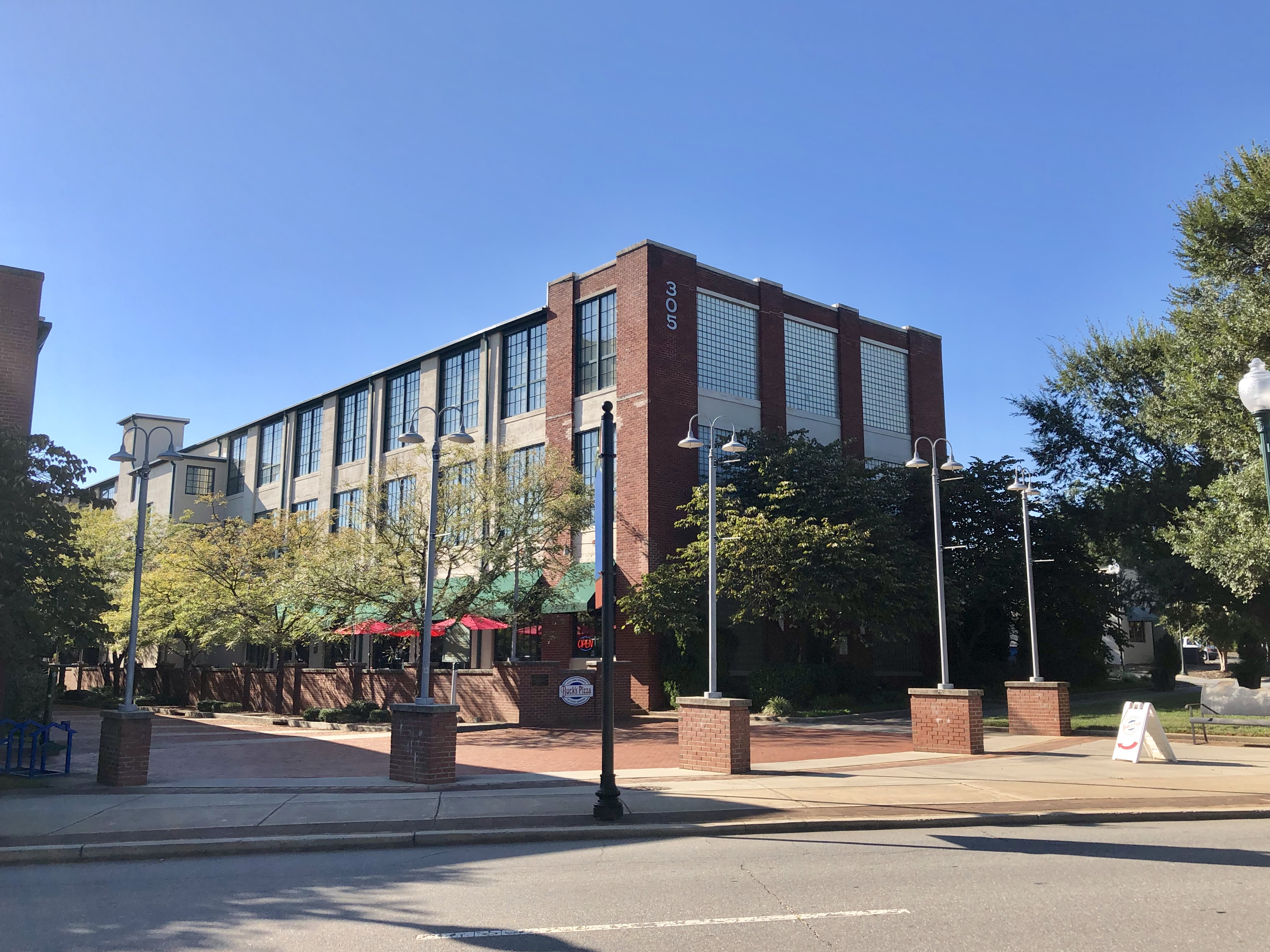
- Hosiery Mill Building, August 2019

- Location within North Carolina Location within the United States
- Location: 101 and 105 Lenoir St., Morganton, North Carolina
- Coordinates: 35°44′51″N 81°41′13″W
- Area: 3.7 acres (1.5 ha)
- Built: 1927-1928, 1928-1939
- Architectural style: Moderne
- NRHP reference No.: 99000064
- Added to NRHP: January 27, 1999

Garrou-Morganton Full-Fashioned Hosiery Mills, also known as Premier Hosiery Mills and Morgantown Hosiery Mills, is a historic hosiery mill complex located at Morganton, Burke County, North Carolina. The complex encompasses three contributing buildings and one contributing structure. They are the two Art Moderne style main buildings (1927-1929 and 1928–1939); Outlet Store (1924) and Water Tower Structure (c. 1939).

It was listed on the National Register of Historic Places in 1999.
