= Smith Clinic =

Historic building in North Carolina, US

- U.S. National Register of Historic Places
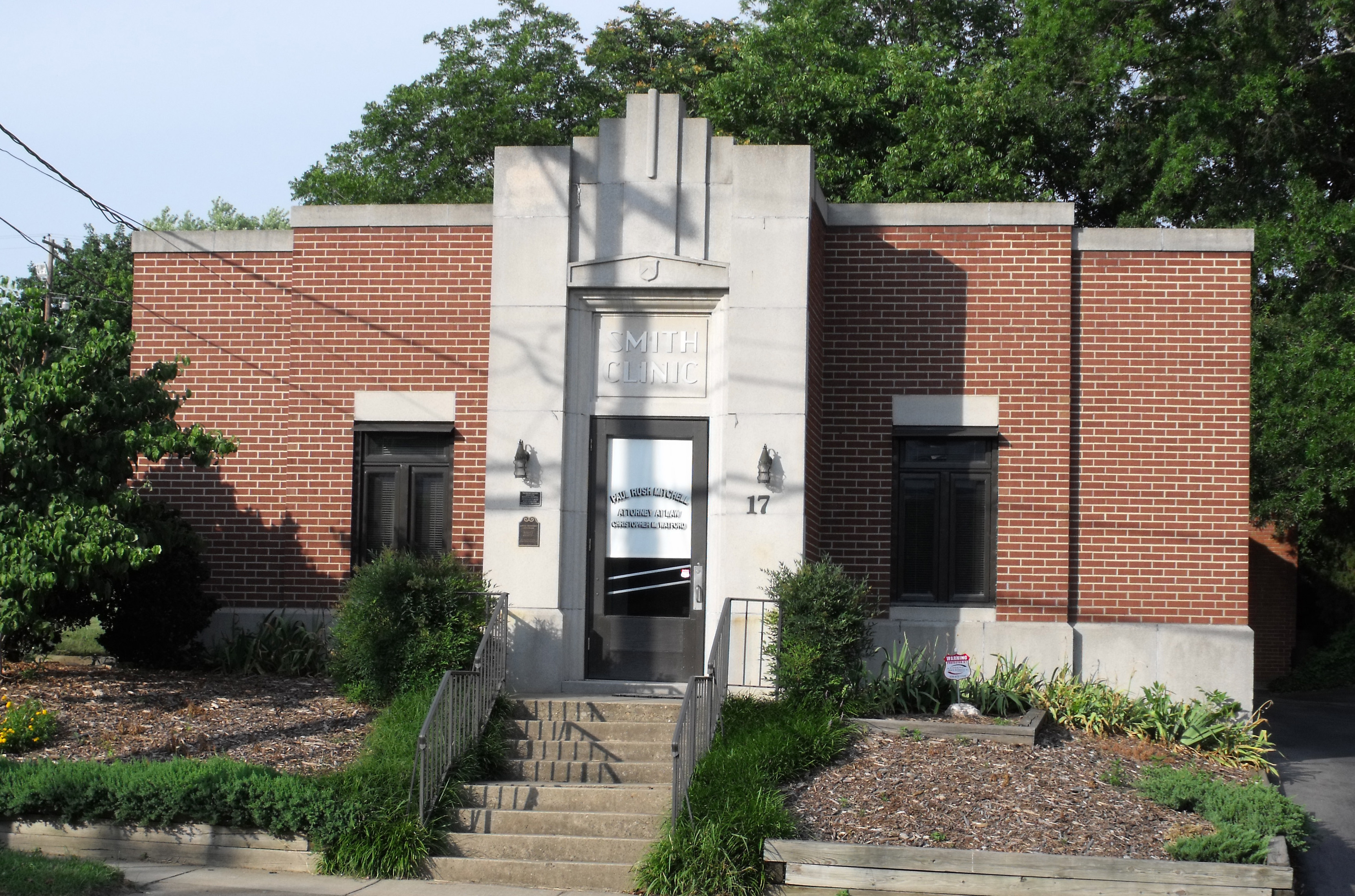
- Smith Clinic, July 2009

- Location within North Carolina Location within the United States
- Location: 17 Randolph St., Thomasville, North Carolina
- Coordinates: 35°52′54″N 80°4′51″W
- Area: less than one acre
- Built: 1939
- Architect: Ferree, Tyson T.
- Architectural style: Art Deco
- NRHP reference No.: 91001746
- Added to NRHP: November 29, 1991

Smith Clinic is a historic office building located at Thomasville, Davidson County, North Carolina. It was built in 1939, and is a small one-story, Art Deco-style brick building. The building measures approximately 34 feet wide and 104 feet deep. It features a projecting entrance bay of case concrete with a stepped parapet over the entrance. For more than 35 years after its construction, the building housed medical offices.

It was added to the National Register of Historic Places in 1991.
