= Downtown Wake Forest Historic District =

Historic district in North Carolina, United States

- U.S. National Register of Historic Places
- U.S. Historic district
- Location within North Carolina Location within the United States
- Location: South White St. roughly from E. Roosevelt Ave. to Owen Ave., Wake Forest, North Carolina
- Coordinates: 35°58′48″N 78°30′36″W
- Area: 6 acres (2.4 ha)
- Built: 1915
- Architect: Hill, George Watts
- Architectural style: Colonial Revival, Art Deco
- MPS: Wake County MPS
- NRHP reference No.: 02000059
- Added to NRHP: February 20, 2002

Downtown Wake Forest Historic District is a national historic district located at Wake Forest, Wake County, North Carolina. The district encompasses 25 contributing buildings, 1 contributing structure, and 1 contributing object built between about 1890 and 1949 and located in the central business district of the town of Wake Forest. It includes notable examples of Colonial Revival and Art Deco style architecture. Notable buildings include the Lovelace Building (1940s), Dick Frye Restaurant (1940s), Powers-Barbee Building (c. 1890, 1940s), Wilkinson Building (1899), B&S Department Store (1894–1895, 1949), Arrington Building (1915), Bank of Wake (1895), Wake Forest Post Office (1914), Collegiate Theater (1915), and Wake Forest Post Office (1940).

The district was listed on the National Register of Historic Places in 2002.
