= Pine State Creamery =

Historic building in North Carolina, US

- Pine State Creamery (former)
- U.S. National Register of Historic Places
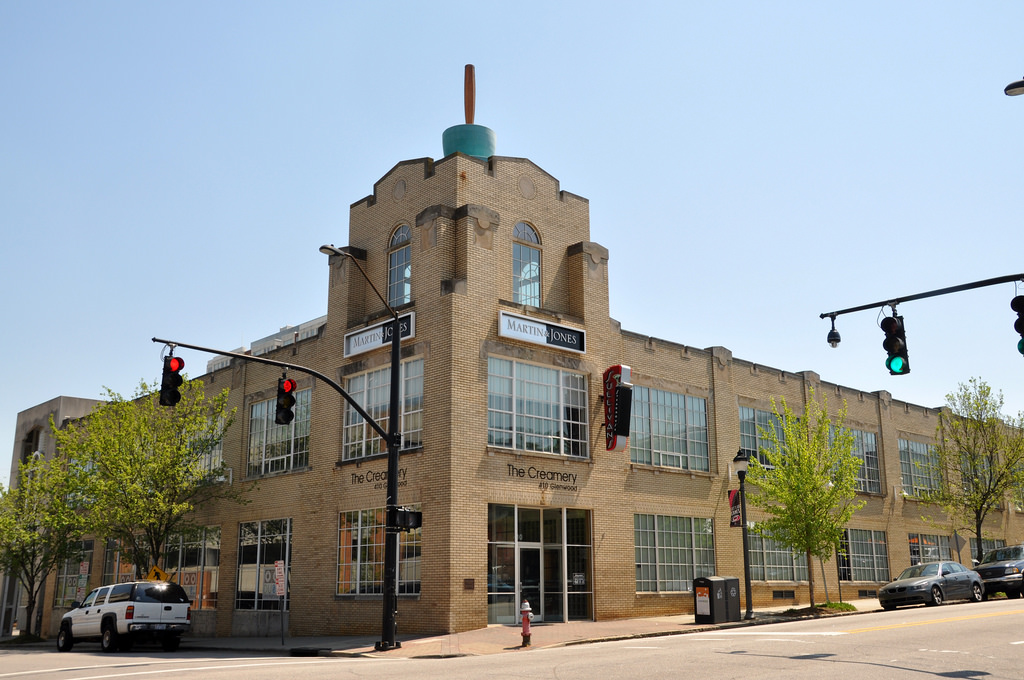

- Location within North Carolina Location within the United States
- Location: 414 Glenwood Ave., Raleigh, North Carolina
- Coordinates: 35°47′8″N 78°38′49″W
- Built: 1928
- Architect: Davidson, James; Mclawhorn, H.R.
- Architectural style: Moderne
- NRHP reference No.: 97001499
- Added to NRHP: December 01, 1997

The Pine State Creamery is a former dairy products factory in Raleigh, North Carolina. It is a Moderne-style building, built in 1928. It is a two-story, five bay by six bay, flat-roofed reinforced concrete building in cream-colored brick. It features a crenellated parapet at the roofline and a three-story corner tower. Additions were made to the original building in the 1940s and 1960s. The building has been converted to office and retail functions.

It was listed on the National Register of Historic Places in 1997 and is a Raleigh Historic Landmark.
