= McGeahy Building =

Historic building in North Carolina, US

- U.S. National Register of Historic Places
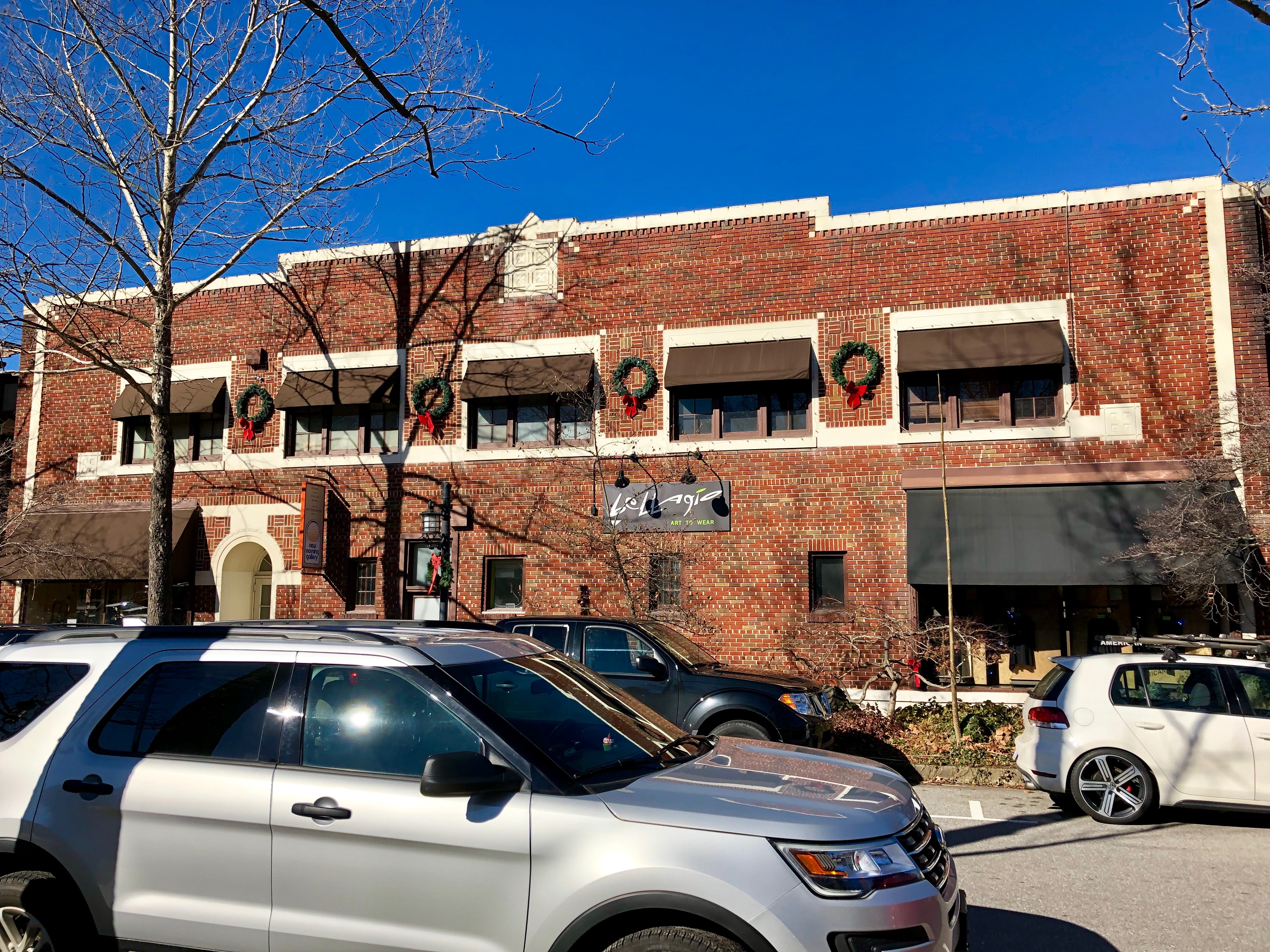
- McGeahy Building, January 2019

- Location within North Carolina Location within the United States
- Location: 7 1/2 Biltmore Plaza, Asheville, North Carolina
- Coordinates: 35°34′3″N 82°32′34″W
- Area: less than one acre
- Built: 1927
- Architect: Green, Ronald
- MPS: Biltmore Village MRA
- NRHP reference No.: 79001679
- Added to NRHP: November 15, 1979

McGeahy Building is a historic commercial building located at Biltmore Village, Asheville, Buncombe County, North Carolina. It was built in 1927, and is a two-story, brick building with a raised parapet.

It was listed on the National Register of Historic Places in 1979.
