= National Register of Historic Places listings in Pitt County, North Carolina =

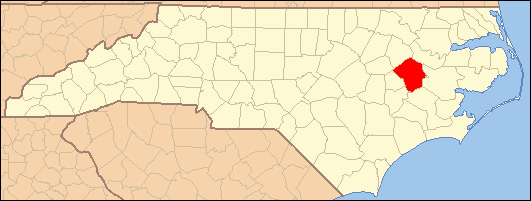

This list includes properties and districts listed on the National Register of Historic Places in Pitt County, North Carolina. Click the "Map of all coordinates" link to the right to view an online map of all properties and districts with latitude and longitude coordinates in the table below.

== Current listings ==
This National Park Service list is complete through NPS recent listings posted March 14, 2025.

	Name on the Register	Image	Date listed	Location	City or town	Description
1	Ayden Historic District		August 26, 1994 (#94001026)	Roughly bounded by Verna St., Peachtree St., E. College St. and Planters St. 35°28′09″N 77°25′13″W	Ayden	
2	Chicod Creek Wreck		August 24, 2018 (#100002805)	Address restricted	Grimesland vicinity	
3	College View Historic District	College View Historic District	March 19, 1992 (#92000181)	Roughly bounded by Holly, Eastern, E. First and E. Fifth Sts. 35°36′37″N 77°21′54″W	Greenville	
4	Cox-Ange House	Cox-Ange House	October 6, 2000 (#00001181)	113 N. Church St. 35°31′43″N 77°24′04″W	Winterville	
5	Dickinson Avenue Historic District	Dickinson Avenue Historic District	March 1, 2007 (#07000092)	600-900 blocks Dickinson Ave., one block of side streets, including W. Eighth, Flicklien, S. Pitt, Clark Sts., Atlantic, Albemarle; 35°36′27″N 77°22′47″W	Greenville	
6	Dupree-Moore Farm		August 28, 2012 (#12000579)	3901 Buck Moore Rd. 35°43′47″N 77°32′25″W	Falkland vicinity	
7	Falkland Historic District		October 3, 2012 (#12000833)	Roughly Crisp, N. Main, & S. Main Sts., & West Ave. 35°41′56″N 77°30′51″W	Falkland	
8	Farmville Historic District	Farmville Historic District	October 21, 1993 (#93001121)	Roughly bounded by Turnage, Pine, Jones, and Waverly Sts. 35°35′56″N 77°35′11″W	Farmville	
9	E. B. Ficklen House	E. B. Ficklen House	December 20, 1984 (#84000564)	508 W. 5th St. 35°36′45″N 77°22′47″W	Greenville	
10	James L. Fleming House	James L. Fleming House	July 21, 1983 (#83001903)	302 S. Greene St. 35°36′47″N 77°22′30″W	Greenville	
11	Fountain Historic District		May 3, 2016 (#16000221)	Roughly bounded by Smith St., Blount St., extending along Wilson St., between Church and Stamper Sts. 35°40′28″N 77°38′19″W	Fountain	
12	Greenville Commercial Historic District	Greenville Commercial Historic District	August 21, 2003 (#03000419)	Roughly bounded by West Third, South Evans and East and West Fifth Sts. 35°36′42″N 77°22′23″W	Greenville	
13	Greenville Tobacco Warehouse Historic District	Greenville Tobacco Warehouse Historic District	July 17, 1997 (#97000726)	Roughly bounded by 12th, Clark, Ficklen, and Washington Sts. • Greenville, North Carolina Warehouse Historic District boundary increase (listed November 30, 1999, refnum 99001450): Eleventh St. near Clark St. 35°36′23″N 77°22′37″W	Greenville	
14	Greenwreath		April 29, 1982 (#82003498)	West of Greenville; 35°36′43″N 77°24′02″W	Greenville	
15	Grimesland Plantation	Grimesland Plantation	March 31, 1971 (#71000616)	East of Grimesland on SR 1569; 35°33′22″N 77°10′02″W	Grimesland	
16	Spencer Harris House		January 20, 2005 (#04001527)	1287 NC 121; 35°39′15″N 77°30′51″W	Falkland	
17	Robert Lee Humber House	Robert Lee Humber House	July 9, 1981 (#81000425)	117 W. 5th St. 35°36′39″N 77°22′18″W	Greenville	
18	Jones-Lee House	Jones-Lee House	November 25, 1980 (#80002894)	805 E. Evans St. 35°36′27″N 77°22′29″W	Greenville	
19	Kittrell-Dail House		March 24, 2000 (#00000287)	Junction of NC 1117 and NC 1114; 35°30′44″N 77°29′14″W	Renston	
20	Robert J. Lang Jr. House		August 23, 1990 (#90001313)	SR 1231, 0.1 miles (0.16 km) south of the junction with SR 1200; 35°37′58″N 77°40′32″W	Fountain	
21	William H. Long House	William H. Long House	April 15, 1982 (#82003499)	200 E. 4th St. 35°26′43″N 77°22′31″W	Greenville	
22	Benjamin May-Lewis House		June 20, 1985 (#85001337)	US 264-A; 35°36′35″N 77°38′36″W	Farmville	
23	Jesse R. Moye House	Jesse R. Moye House	October 17, 1997 (#97001220)	408 W. Fifth St. 35°36′43″N 77°22′38″W	Greenville	
24	Oakmont		October 15, 2001 (#01001115)	2909 S. Memorial Dr. 35°34′59″N 77°23′45″W	Greenville	
25	Pitt County Courthouse	Pitt County Courthouse	May 10, 1979 (#79001745)	N. 3rd St. between Washington and S. Evan St. 35°36′49″N 77°22′23″W	Greenville	part of the North Carolina County Courthouses Thematic Resource (TR)
26	Red Banks Primitive Baptist Church	Red Banks Primitive Baptist Church	February 20, 2002 (#02000060)	NC 1704, junction with NC 1725; 35°34′18″N 77°20′28″W	Bell Fork	
27	Renston Rural Historic District		December 4, 2003 (#03001236)	Approximately 2.5 miles (4.0 km) along NC 903, roughly bounded by NC 1127 and Stokes Ln. 35°31′33″N 77°28′43″W	Winterville	
28	St. John's Episcopal Church	St. John's Episcopal Church	December 2, 1986 (#86003268)	SE corner of SR 1917 and SR 1753; 35°22′24″N 77°21′36″W	St. John's	
29	Thomas Sheppard Farm		May 18, 2000 (#00000517)	NC 1550, near the junction of NC 1552; 35°41′37″N 77°12′35″W	Stokes	
30	Skinnerville-Greenville Heights Historic District	Skinnerville-Greenville Heights Historic District	December 23, 2005 (#05001452)	Roughly bounded by Pitt St., Martin Luther King Kr. Dr., Ward St., White St., Tyson St., Fairfax St., the Tar River; 35°35′20″N 77°22′53″W	Greenville	
31	H. B. Sugg School		November 9, 2020 (#100005751)	3632 South George St. 35°35′29″N 77°35′36″W	Farmville	
32	US Post Office	US Post Office	February 6, 1986 (#86000784)	215 S. Evans St. 35°36′47″N 77°22′21″W	Greenville	

== See also ==
- National Register of Historic Places listings in North Carolina
- List of National Historic Landmarks in North Carolina
