= Oakmont (disambiguation) =

Oakmont may refer to:

- Oakmont, Maryland
- Oakmont, California, a neighborhood and golf club in Santa Rosa, California
- Oakmont (Greenville, North Carolina), listed on the National Register of Historic Places in Pitt County, North Carolina
- Oakmont, Pennsylvania
  - Oakmont Country Club, host of the 2016 U.S. Open
- Oakmont, Haverford Township, Pennsylvania
- Oakmont, West Virginia
