= Edward Cobb Outlaw =

American Naval Aviator, Flying Ace, Ship's Captain and Fleet Commander

Edward C. Outlaw
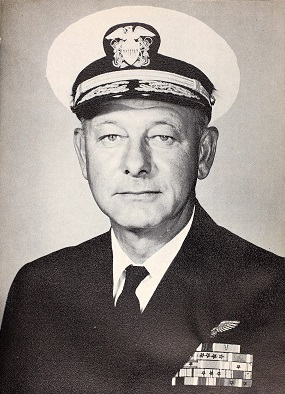
- Rear Admiral Outlaw, 1965, as Commander Carrier Division 1
- Born: September 29, 1914; Greenville, North Carolina, U.S.
- Died: March 5, 1996 (aged 81); Durham, North Carolina, U.S.
- Military career
- Allegiance: United States of America
- Branch: United States Navy
- Service years: 1931–1969
- Rank: Rear Admiral (two-star)
- Units: VS-6, USS Enterprise; VGS-11, USS Altamaha; VF-32, USS Langley
- Conflicts: World War II: Guadalcanal campaign; Marshall Islands campaign; Mariana campaign; Philippines campaign; Vietnam War
- Awards: Navy Cross; Distinguished Flying Cross(2); Air Medal(6); Navy Occupation Service Medal; National Defense Service Medal

RADM Edward Cobb Outlaw (September 29, 1914 – March 5, 1996) was a naval aviator, flying ace, ship's captain and fleet commander of the United States Navy. Outlaw first served as commanding officer of Fighting Squadron 32 (VF-32) aboard the light carrier USS Langley during World War II. He was awarded the Navy Cross for a mission with this squadron in which he shot down five Japanese planes, making him an ace in a day.

Outlaw served in command positions during the Vietnam War including task group and task force commander, carrier division commander, and finally a joint post as NATO's commander of Maritime Air Forces Mediterranean and the Navy's Commander Anti-Submarine Warfare for the Sixth Fleet.

== Early life ==
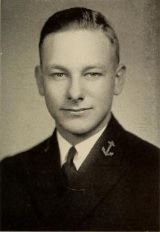
1935 U.S. Naval Academy Senior portrait

Outlaw was born to Mr. and Mrs. Needham Whitfield Outlaw on September 29, 1914, in Greenville, North Carolina. After high school, Outlaw received appointment to the United States Naval Academy, where he participated in track. He graduated in 1935 as the youngest member of his class.

His first assignment was to the USS Indianapolis. He was then ordered to flight training school and in 1938 was designated naval aviator. Before the United States entered World War II, he served first as a member of USS Enterprise's Scouting Squadron 6 (VS-6) and then as chief flight officer at Naval Air Station Corpus Christi.

== World War II ==
In March 1942, just a few months after the attack on Pearl Harbor, Outlaw was made executive officer of Escort Scouting Squadron 11 (VGS-11). After its initial training period, the squadron reported aboard USS Altamaha on November 2, 1942. For the month of December the squadron provided air cover and anti-submarine patrol in the vicinity of Nouméa. All throughout January and February 1943, VGS-11 operated as a land-based unit. Most of their time was spent on Guadalcanal in the closing weeks of the Guadalcanal Campaign.

Outlaw was next appointed commanding officer (CO) of newly commissioned Fighting Squadron 32 (VF-32) on June 1, 1943. The squadron reported aboard the similarly newly commissioned light carrier USS Langley on October 21, 1943. After giving the carrier its shakedown cruise and completing its final phase of training, the squadron met Langley at sea on January 19, 1944, and ten days later began its combat cruise.

VF-32 executed pre-invasion strikes against the Japanese-held Marshall Islands in early February and continued to provide air support for American invasion forces throughout the month. At the end of March, VF-32 quickly struck out at the Palau Islands. In April Langley moved on to participate in the New Guinea campaign, where VF-32 provided strikes and air support for landings at Hollandia.

The squadron participated in strikes against Chuuk Lagoon in the Caroline Islands between April 29–30. On the first of these days, Outlaw led a fighter sweep consisting of 8 Langley planes intended to meet up with other fighter aircraft for attacks on military installations. VF-32 arrived at the target site before any of the other squadrons and immediately engaged 35–40 Mitsubishi A6M Zero fighter planes in aerial combat. Despite these odds, VF-32 shot down 21 enemy aircraft without suffering a single loss. Outlaw himself was credited with 5 kills and a probable on this sortie, making him an ace-in-a-day.

On May 12, 1944, while Langley was at anchor in Majuro between strike action, Outlaw was promoted to Commander Air Group 32 (CAG-32). The air group resumed its flight schedule on June 6 as part of the opening air strikes of the Mariana campaign. During the initial fighter sweep that day, CAG Outlaw downed an enemy Zero, bringing his score to six. The air group served as Combat Air Patrol (CAP) or Anti-Submarine Patrol (ASP) over their task group for much of June, though strikes were flown against targets on Saipan, Rota and Pagan. While at Eniwetok re-provisioning and rearming for the upcoming assault on Guam, Outlaw received a rank promotion to Commander. Air Group 32 carried out strikes on Guam from July 18 to August 7. On August 24, 1944, Commander Outlaw was relieved of command.

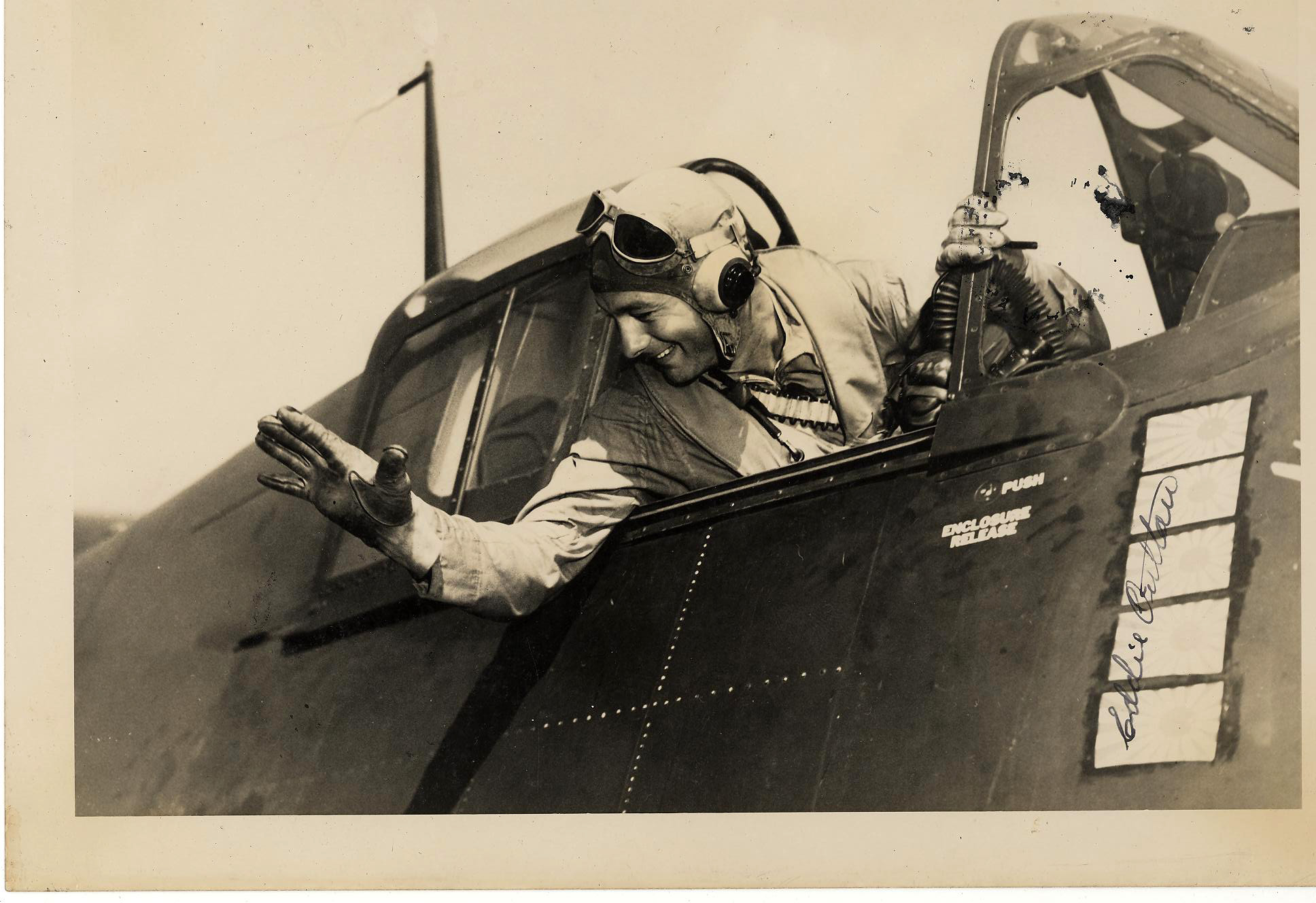
"Eddie" Outlaw in an F6F Hellcat fighter plane displaying five kills

Outlaw's final wartime posts were as Staff Operations Officer to Task Groups 38.2/58.2 until March 1945, Executive Officer of NAS Corpus Christi up through July 1945, and finally as training officer on the staff of the Chief of Naval Air Basic Training at Naval Air Station Pensacola, a position he held until December 1946.

== Post-WWII ==
USS Coral Sea was commissioned October 1, 1947, and Outlaw was put in command of the carrier's first air group, Battle Carrier Air Group 5. His next major post was as Operations Officer—and then briefly as Commanding Officer—of Composite Squadron VC-5. This was the first US Navy air unit used to test carrier-capable, nuclear armed aircraft. Continuing in this vein, Outlaw participated in the Armed Forces Special Weapons Project as Chief of Operations and Training.

After a tour as Executive Officer aboard USS Franklin D. Roosevelt in 1953, Outlaw moved through a number of staff positions related to his early experience with nuclear arms. He was then promoted to captain and served as commanding officer of the USS Duxbury Bay between 1958–1959. In 1959 he captained USS Intrepid. The last position Outlaw filled before his involvement with the Vietnam War was as Commander of the US Naval Aviation Safety Center. In this capacity he published papers concerning aircraft accidents and the reliability of contractor-built products.

== Vietnam War ==
Edward Outlaw, now a rear admiral, became Commander Carrier Division 1 on July 1, 1964. From his flagship USS Coral Sea, Outlaw's Task Force 77 participated in the first carrier strikes against North Vietnamese forces. Over the course of their first two months of strikes beginning February 7, 1965, the task force's three carriers hit five target areas in the face of intense ground fire.

== Cold War ==
October 29, 1965, Outlaw assumed command of Hunter-Killer Force Atlantic Fleet and Carrier Division 16. Aboard his flagship USS Randolph, Outlaw was responsible for anti-submarine warfare operations, which at this time meant protecting the fleet from approximately 400 Russian submarines. He continued in this specialty when in May 1968 he was appointed Commander Anti-Submarine Warfare Forces Sixth Fleet; and later in the year when he received a joint position as NATO's Commander Maritime Air Forces Mediterranean, a role intended to better track Soviet ship activity.

== Awards and decorations ==

Naval Aviator insignia
Navy Cross		Legion of Merit
Distinguished Flying Cross	Air Medal	Navy Commendation Medal
Presidential Unit Citation	Navy Unit Commendation Medal	American Defense Service Medal
American Campaign Medal	Asiatic–Pacific Campaign Medal	World War II Victory Medal
Navy Occupation Service Medal	National Defense Service Medal	Philippine Liberation Medal
