= College View =

College View may refer to:

== Places ==
=== Australia ===
- College View, Queensland, a rural locality

=== United States ===
- College View, Nebraska, a community in the United States
- College View Historic District, a historic district in Greenville, North Carolina

== Other ==
- The College View, the student newspaper of Dublin City University
