= Greenville Mall =

Coordinates: 35.5865°N 77.3682°W

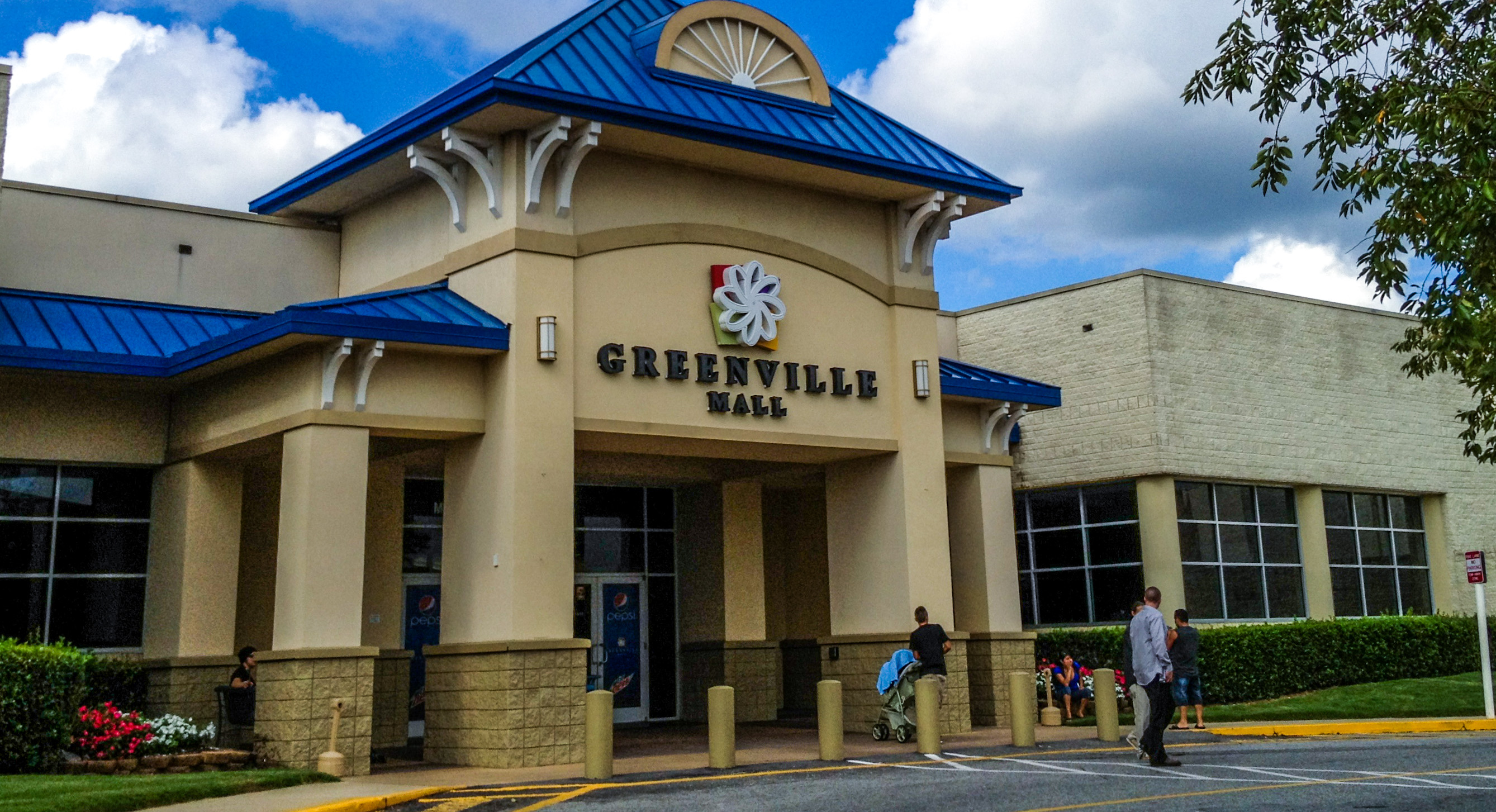
- Entrance to Greenville Mall, August 2012
- Location: Greenville, North Carolina, United States
- Address: 714 Greenville Boulevard Southeast
- Opened: 1965; 61 years ago
- Developer: Pitt Plaza Inc., W.B. Leverton
- Manager: Spinoso Real Estate Group
- Owner: Spinoso Real Estate Group
- Num. of stores: approx. 60
- Num. of anchor tenants: 3
- Floor area: 533,000 square feet (49,517 m^{2}) (GLA)
- Floors: 1
- Website: thegreenvillemall.com

Greenville Mall is a 533,000 square feet (49,500 m^{2}) shopping mall in Greenville, North Carolina, United States owned and managed by Spinoso Real Estate Group. It is located at the corner of Greenville and Arlington Boulevards.

== History ==
Greenville Mall was originally built as a strip center named Pitt Plaza, which opened in 1966 with J. C. Penney as an anchor. It was announced in 1984 that the shopping center was to be converted into a 300,000 sq ft enclosed shopping mall called The Plaza, managed by Pentagon Properties of Raleigh. It was subsequently renamed Colonial Mall Greenville when purchased by Colonial Properties Trust. The purchase of the mall by GG&A in 2007 resulted in the name being changed to Greenville Mall.

The mall has 65 stores, with Belk, J. C. Penney and Dunham's Sports as anchor stores.
