= H. B. Sugg High School =

Former school in North Carolina, US

- H. B. Sugg School
- U.S. National Register of Historic Places
- Location: 3632 South George Street, Farmville, Pitt County, North Carolina, U.S.
- Coordinates: 35.5914°N 77.5934°W
- Built: 1915
- NRHP reference No.: 100005751
- Added to NRHP: November 9, 2020

The H. B. Sugg High School, also known as Farmville Colored School, is a historic segregated public high school for African American students located in Farmville, North Carolina, United States. It is listed as the H. B. Sugg School on the National Register of Historic Places listings since November 9, 2020 for its educational history and cultural history.

== History ==
Since at least 1903, a school for African American children existed in Farmville. In 1908, the school moved to a new building known as the Harper Hotel. In 1918, Herman Bryan Sugg (1885–1980), for which the school was named after, joined the faculty. Sugg was a strong advocate for the school and was instrumental in securing funding from the state and the community.

In the early 1920s, a new school was built as a result of the Rosenwald building program, which provided funds for the construction of over 4,900 schools for African Americans in the South. The school was a ten-room, two-story frame building. In 1936, a six-room brick building was added, funded by the Works Progress Administration. In 1949, another building funded by bonds was added, in part to resist school integration by creating "more equal" facilities.

In the 1953–1954 school year, the school was renamed from the Farmville Colored School to the H.B. Sugg School. By 1957, the school was the largest in Pitt County with 8% of the county's students. Sugg retired as school principal in 1959, and went on the join the Farmville School Board in 1965. From 1971 to 1999, the school was an integrated elementary school.

Former principals include Frederick Graham. Notable alumni include Alma Hobbs of the U.S. Department of Agriculture.

== See also ==
- National Register of Historic Places listings in Pitt County, North Carolina
