= Skinnerville–Greenville Heights Historic District =

Historic district in North Carolina, United States

- U.S. National Register of Historic Places
- U.S. Historic district
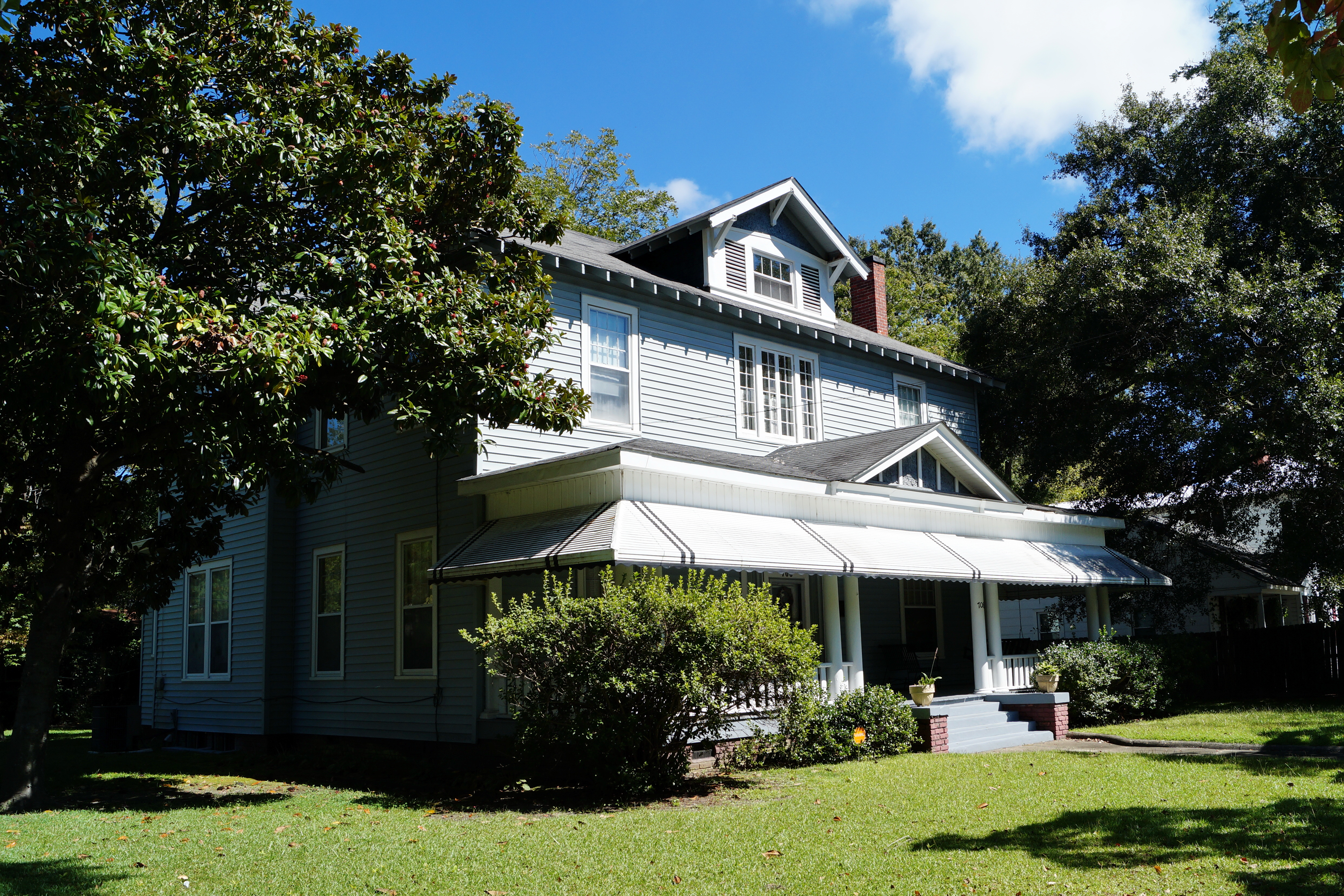
- House in the Skinnerville–Greenville Heights Historic District, September 2014

- Location within North Carolina Location within the United States
- Location: Roughly bounded by Pitt St., NC 11/US 13, 5th St., and the Tar River
- Coordinates: 35°35′20″N 77°22′53″W
- Area: 95 acres (38 ha)
- Built by: Baker, William Bertrand; et.al.
- Architectural style: Queen Anne, Bungalow/craftsman
- NRHP reference No.: 05001452
- Added to NRHP: December 23, 2005

Skinnerville–Greenville Heights Historic District is a national historic district located in Greenville, North Carolina, United States. The district encompasses 280 contributing buildings, 1 contributing site, and 1 contributing structure in a predominantly residential section of Greenville. It includes buildings dated from about 1845 to 1955 and notable examples of Bungalow / American Craftsman and Queen Anne architecture. Located in the district are the separately listed E. B. Ficklen House and Jesse R. Moye House. Other notable buildings include the Third Street Elementary School (1929), Glenn-Pender-Moore House (c. 1882), York-Overton House (1908), George W. and Lina Baker House (1907), Roy C. and Helen Flanagan House, Jarvis Harding House (1919), and A.G. and Pattie W. Witherington House (1948).

It was listed on the National Register of Historic Places in 2005.
