= WOOW =

Radio station in Greenville, North Carolina

Greenville, North Carolina; United States
- Frequency: 1340 kHz

Programming
- Format: Defunct

Ownership
- Owner: The Minority Voice, Inc.

History
- First air date: October 1959

Technical information
- Facility ID: 65960
- Class: C
- Power: 1,000 watts
- Transmitter coordinates: 35°36′58″N 77°22′14″W

WOOW (1340 AM) was a radio station broadcasting a Gospel music format. Licensed to Greenville, North Carolina, the station was last owned by The Minority Voice.

On July 31, 2019, WOOW's license was deleted by the FCC due to being silent over a one-year period.
