= Stokes, North Carolina =

Coordinates: 35°43′00″N 77°15′53″W

Stokes is a census-designated place in Pitt County, North Carolina, United States. The CDP is a part of the Greenville Metropolitan Area in North Carolina's Inner Banks region. As of the 2020 census its population is 357.

It is located 10 miles northeast of Greenville along North Carolina Highway 30.

== History ==
The Thomas Sheppard Farm was listed on the National Register of Historic Places in 2000.

John Henry Roberson, Jr., a direct descendant of the founders of Robersonville, owned his own farm south of Robersonville, and was involved in many civic affairs with his brothers David Roberson and Grover H. Roberson.

== Education ==
Stokes' local school is Stokes Elementary School, serving grades pre-K through 8th; North Pitt High School serves grades 9-12.

== Utilities ==
Stokes Regional Water Company serves local water needs; Stokes & Congleton Gas Co. is the local Propane(LP) supplier, www.stokescongleton.com; Embarq is the local telephone and ADSL company; and GUC provides electricity.

== Sources ==
- Chronicles of Pitt County, Volume I. Pitt County Historical Society, Elizabeth Copeland, Editor, 1982, reprinted 2003.
- Chronicles of Pitt County, Volume II. Pitt County Historical Society, Sandra Hunsucker, Executive Editor, 2005.
- History of Pitt and Martin Counties.
- History of the Roberson Family of Martin County.
