= Thomas Sheppard Farm =

Historic farm in North Carolina, United States

- U.S. National Register of Historic Places
- Location within North Carolina Location within the United States
- Location: NC 1550, near jct. of NC 1552, Stokes, North Carolina
- Coordinates: 35°41′37″N 77°12′35″W
- Area: 36.9 acres (14.9 ha)
- Built: c. 1850
- Architectural style: Greek Revival
- NRHP reference No.: 00000517
- Added to NRHP: May 18, 2000

Thomas Sheppard Farm, also known as Sheppard Mill Farm, is a historic home and farm located near Stokes, Pitt County, North Carolina. The farmhouse was built about 1850, and is a two-story, heavy timber frame dwelling with a one-story shed addition and Greek Revival style design elements. A one-story kitchen wing constructed about 1930, and was enlarged and joined to the main block about 1950. It features a one-story portico with Doric order columns. Also on the property are the contributing tenant house (c. 1930), stock barn (c. 1930), tobacco barn (c. 1930), hog pen (c. 1930), chicken house (c. 1930), brick well house (c. 1930), and agricultural landscape.

It was listed on the National Register of Historic Places in 2000.
