= Greenwreath =

Historic house in North Carolina, United States

- U.S. National Register of Historic Places
- Location within North Carolina Location within the United States
- Location: West of Greenville, near Greenville, North Carolina
- Coordinates: 35°40′36″N 77°29′23″W
- Area: 1.5 acres (0.61 ha)
- Built: c. 1780
- NRHP reference No.: 82003498
- Added to NRHP: April 29, 1982

Greenwreath, also known as the Foreman House, is a historic home located near Greenville, Pitt County, North Carolina. It was built around 1780, and is a 2 1/2-story, five bay frame dwelling with beaded siding and an exterior end chimneys. It was built in stages starting with a hall and parlor two room house in 1780, then extended to add a new front room around 1791 forming an L-configuration, and extended again with the federal 2 1/2-story structure being built in front of the original house around 1820 and attached to it so that the original house now forms a rear shed wing. Also on the property are the contributing tenant house, outbuilding, and a small Victorian-period brick ice house.

It was added to the National Register of Historic Places in 1982.
