= Viva Greenville =

Viva Greenville is the first community Hispanic newspaper in Eastern North Carolina, founded in 2006. It distributes 5,000 free copies in more than 100 locations in Pitt, Beaufort, Greene, Wilson and Lenoir counties. The publication provides local news, events, information about healthcare, education and social activities in Spanish.
