= James L. Fleming House =

Historic house in North Carolina, United States

- U.S. National Register of Historic Places
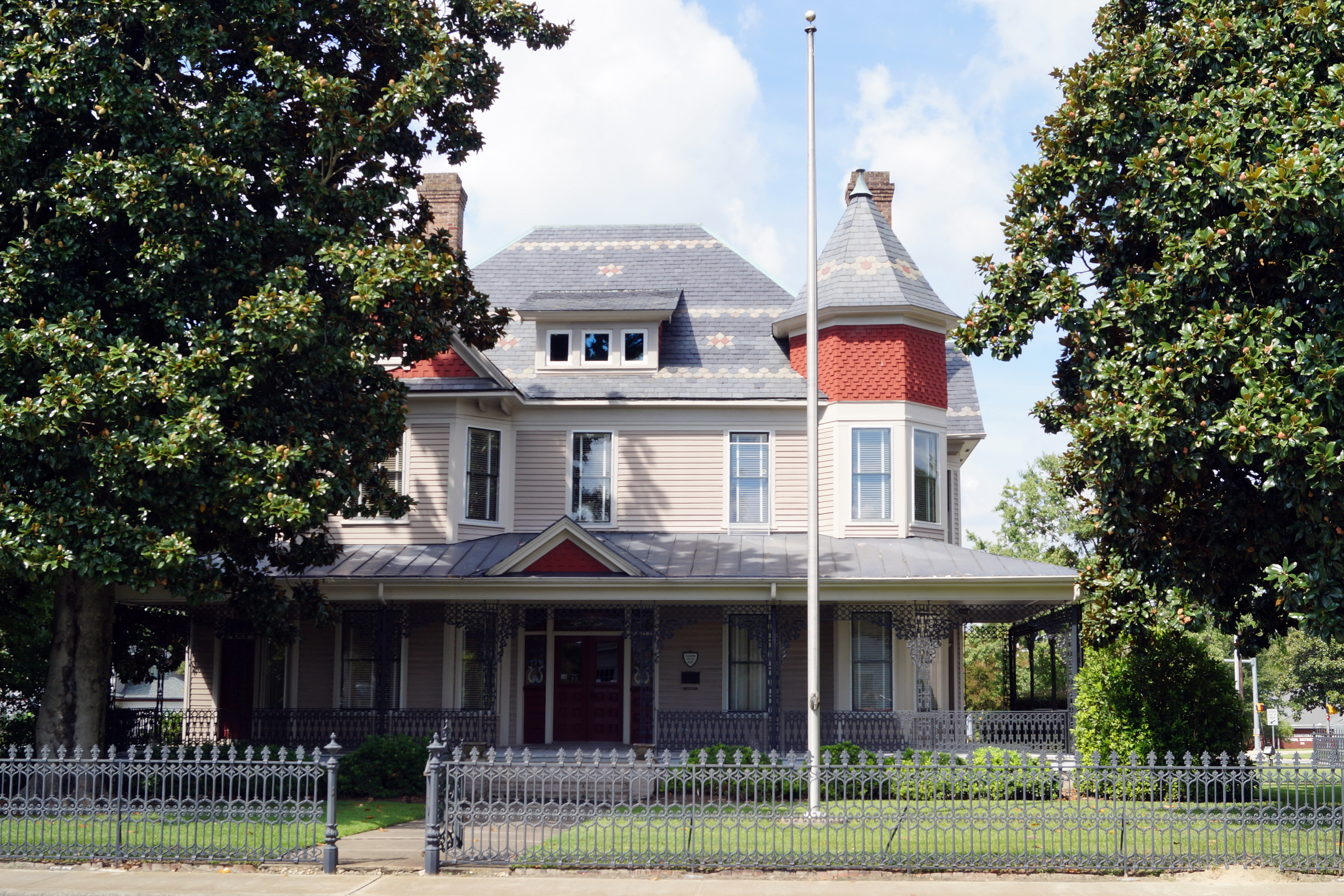

- Location within North Carolina Location within the United States
- Location: 302 S. Greene St., Greenville, North Carolina
- Coordinates: 35°36′47″N 77°22′30″W
- Area: 0.3 acres (0.12 ha)
- Built: 1901–1902
- Built by: West, C. B.
- Architect: Barber & Klutz
- Architectural style: Queen Anne
- NRHP reference No.: 83001903
- Added to NRHP: July 21, 1983

The James L. Fleming House, also known as the Fleming-Winstead House, is a historic home located at 302 S. Greene St. in Greenville, Pitt County, North Carolina. It was built in 1901–1902, and is a 2 1/2-story, frame Queen Anne style dwelling, with design credited to Barber & Klutz who published architectural pattern books. It has a central hall, double pile plan and a one-story rear ell and two-story rear addition. It features a three-stage polygonal tower, slate covered hipped roof, and two-story polygonal bays.

It was listed on the National Register of Historic Places in 1983.

James Leonidas Fleming (1867-1909), who established East Carolina University in Greenville, built the home for his wife, Lula White, and his family. Fleming was elected to the state senate and began efforts to establish the East Carolina Teacher's Training School, and getting it situated in Greenville. He was later killed in an automobile accident along the Greenville and Raleigh Plank Road in 1909.
