= United States Post Office (Greenville, North Carolina) =

Historic building in North Carolina, US

- US Post Office
- U.S. National Register of Historic Places
- U.S. Historic district – Contributing property
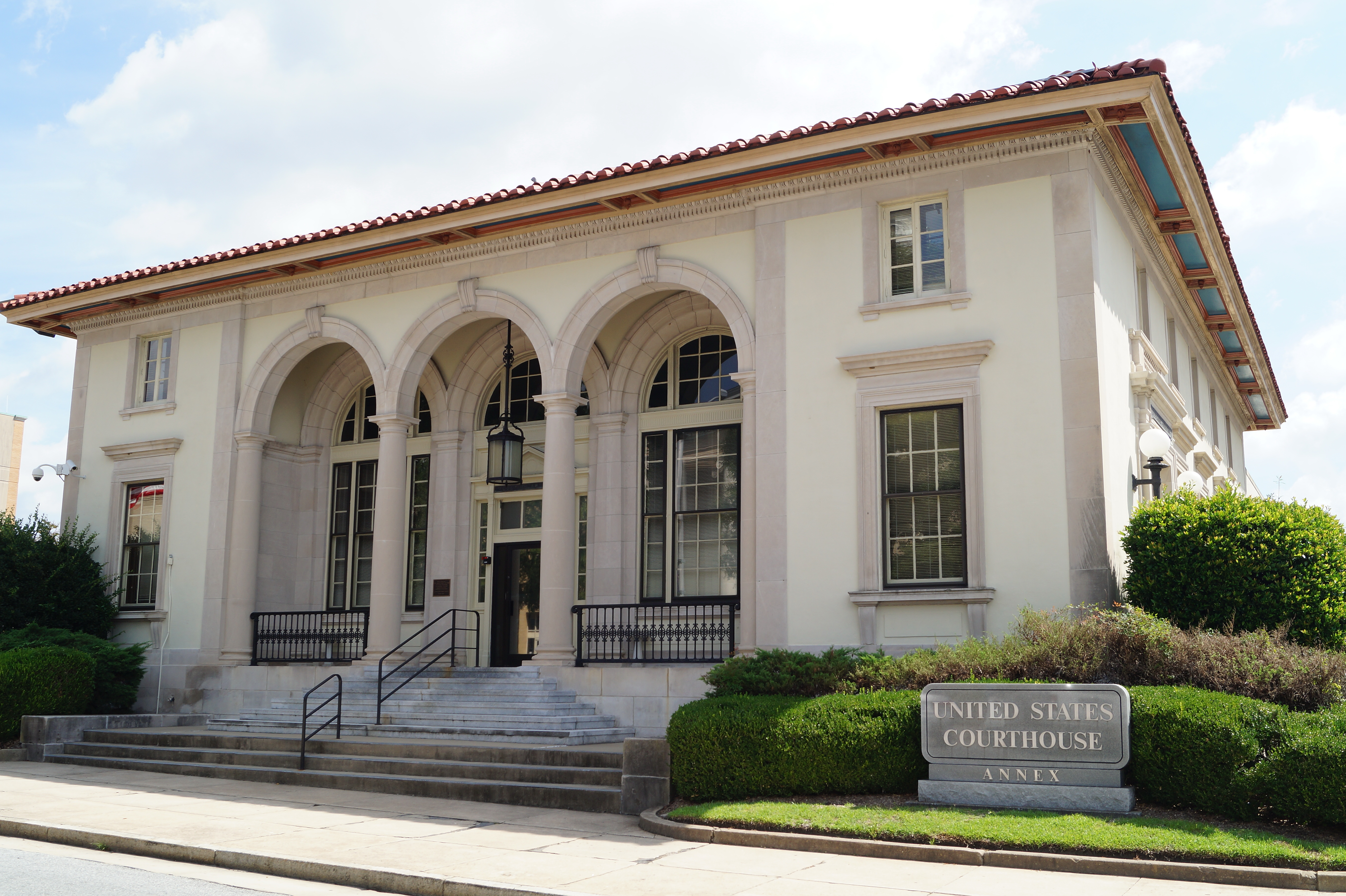
- U.S. Post Office, September 2014

- Location within North Carolina Location within the United States
- Location: 215 Evans St., Greenville, North Carolina
- Coordinates: 35°36′47″N 77°22′21″W
- Area: less than one acre
- Built: 1913-1914
- Architect: Oscar Wenderoth
- Architectural style: Florintine Renaissance
- NRHP reference No.: 86000784
- Added to NRHP: February 6, 1986

The United States Post Office, also known as the Federal Building, is a historic post office building located at Greenville, Pitt County, North Carolina. It was designed by the Office of the Supervising Architect under the direction of Oscar Wenderoth and built in 1913–1914. It is a two-story, five-bay, Florintine Renaissance style stuccoed brick building on a limestone base. It has a low hip roof of terra cotta tile with overhanging eaves. The front facade features a three-bay loggia formed by arches with voluted keystones, springing from Tuscan order columns. This building served as the main post office for Greenville until 1969. It currently serves as a U.S. Courthouse.

It was added to the National Register of Historic Places in 1986. It is located in the Greenville Commercial Historic District.
