= William H. Long House =

Historic house in North Carolina, United States

- U.S. National Register of Historic Places
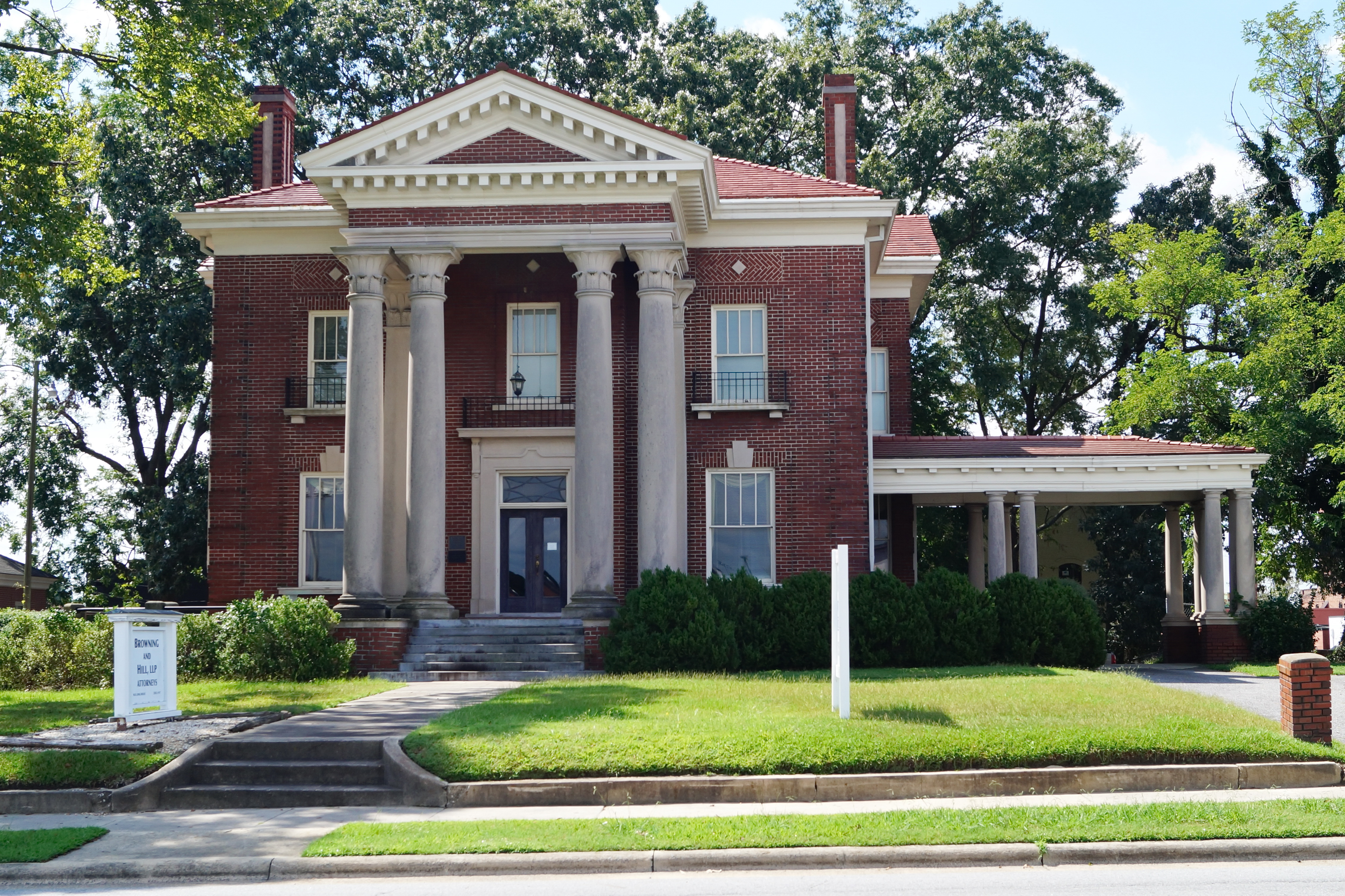
- William H. Long House, September 2014

- Location within North Carolina Location within the United States
- Interactive map showing the location of William H. Long House
- Location: 200 E. 4th St., Greenville, North Carolina
- Coordinates: 35°26′43″N 77°22′31″W
- Area: less than one acre
- Built: 1917–1918
- Architectural style: Classical Revival
- NRHP reference No.: 82003499
- Added to NRHP: April 15, 1982

William H. Long House is a historic home located at Greenville, Pitt County, North Carolina. It was built in 1917–1918, and is a two-story, brick veneer dwelling with Classical Revival style design elements. It a hipped roof intersected by gable roofed wings on the back and sides. It features a monumental pedimented portico and porte cochere supported by paired Tuscan order columns. It was built by William Henry Long (1866–1920), who served as mayor of Greenville from 1901 to 1903. It was renovated about 1980 to house law offices.

It was added to the National Register of Historic Places in 1982.
