= Greenville Tobacco Warehouse Historic District =

Historic district in North Carolina, United States

- U.S. National Register of Historic Places
- U.S. Historic district
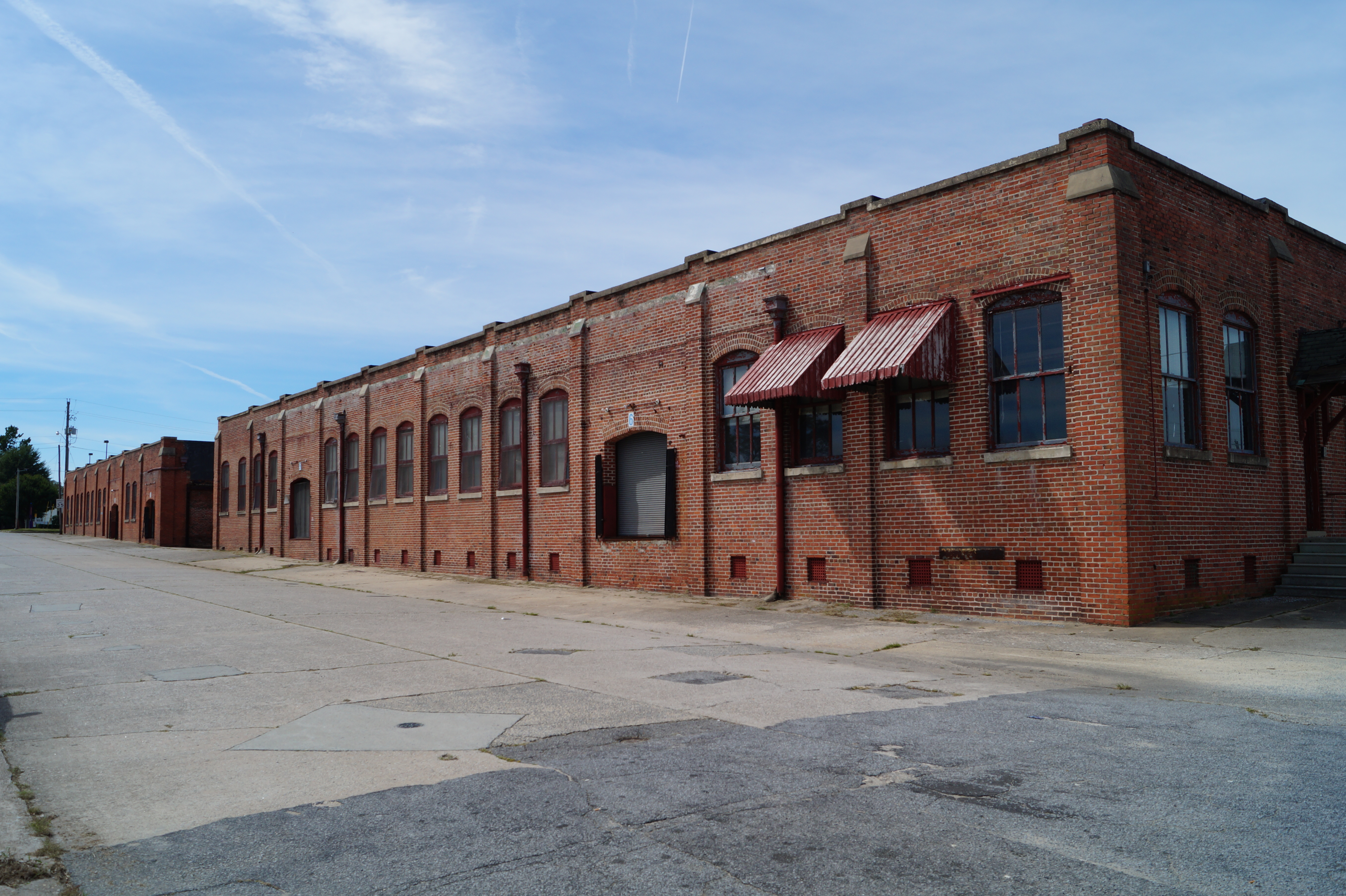
- Greenville Tobacco Warehouse Historic District, September 2014

- Location within North Carolina Location within the United States
- Location: Roughly bounded by Twelfth, Clark, Ficklen, and Washington Sts.; Eleventh St. near Clark St., Greenville, North Carolina
- Coordinates: 35°36′23″N 77°22′37″W
- Area: 10.8 acres (4.4 ha)
- Built: 1905
- Architectural style: Art Deco, Industrial Italianate
- NRHP reference No.: 97000726, 99001450 (Boundary Increase)
- Added to NRHP: July 17, 1997, November 30, 1999 (Boundary Increase)

Greenville Tobacco Warehouse Historic District is a national historic district located at Greenville, Pitt County, North Carolina. The district encompasses seven contributing buildings and one contributing structures in an industrial section of Greenville. It includes buildings dated from about 1905 to 1947 and notable examples of Art Deco and Italianate style industrial architecture. Contributing resources are the American Tobacco Company Storage Warehouse #2. (c. 1905); the Prichard-Hughes Warehouse (c. 1905, with c. 1923 addition); the Dail-Ficklen Warehouse (c. 1911, with c. 1923, 1947, and 1963 additions); the Export Leaf Factory (1914, with 1928, 1932, and 1938 additions); the E. B. Ficklen Factory (c. 1916, with additions c. 1923, c. 1925, c. 1945, and c. 1950); the Gorman Warehouse (1927); the Star Warehouse (1930); and the System of CSX Railroad Tracks.

It was listed on the National Register of Historic Places in 1997, with a boundary increase in 1999.
