= Robert Lee Humber House =

Historic house in North Carolina, United States

- U.S. National Register of Historic Places
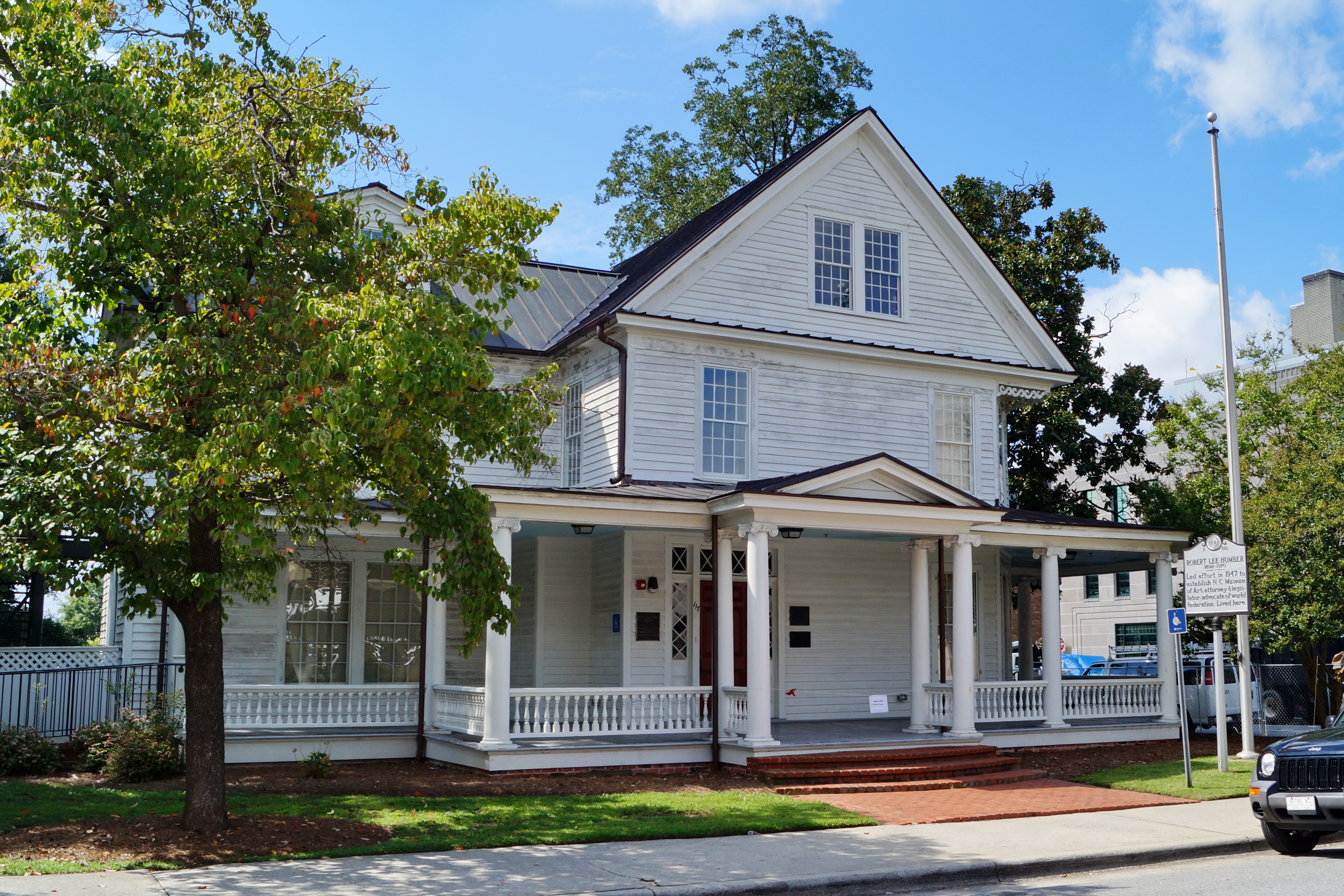
- Robert Lee Humber House, September 2014

- Location within North Carolina Location within the United States
- Interactive map showing the location of Robert Lee Humber House
- Location: 117 W. 5th St., Greenville, North Carolina
- Coordinates: 35.611210569114206°N 77.37398078932681°W
- Area: 1 acre (0.40 ha)
- Built: 1895
- Built by: Humber, Robert Lee Sr.
- Architectural style: Colonial Revival
- NRHP reference No.: 81000425
- Added to NRHP: July 9, 1981

Robert Lee Humber House is a historic home located at Greenville, Pitt County, North Carolina. It was built in 1895, and is a 2 1/2-story, "T"-plan, frame dwelling with Queen Anne and Colonial Revival style design elements. It has a one-story rear kitchen ell and a wraparound porch with Ionic order columns.

It is the birthplace and home of Robert Lee Humber, Jr., an international lawyer, intellectual, and public servant. House was constructed for his father, Robert Lee Humber, Sr. Following the death of Lucie Berthier Humber, wife of Robert Lee Humber, Jr., on 28 June 1982, the Humbers' heirs gave the family's Greenville home to the people of Greenville and Pitt County as a "living tribute" to the Humbers and their lifetime of public service.

It was added to the National Register of Historic Places in 1981.
