= E. B. Ficklen House =

Historic house in North Carolina, United States

- U.S. National Register of Historic Places
- U.S. Historic district – Contributing property
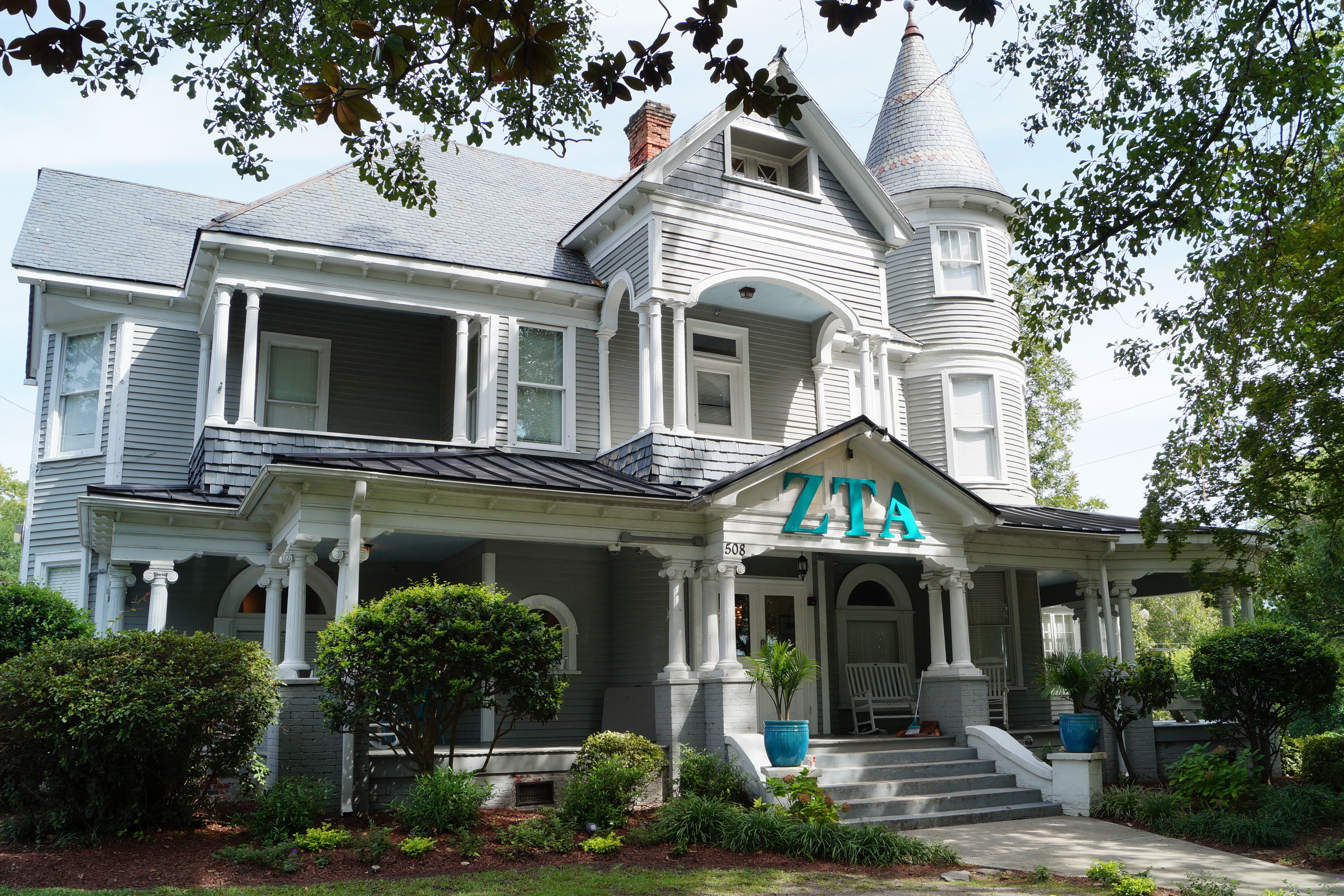
- E. B. Ficklen House, September 2014

- Location within North Carolina Location within the United States
- Location: 508 W. 5th St., Greenville, North Carolina
- Coordinates: 35°36′45″N 77°22′47″W
- Area: 1.2 acres (0.49 ha)
- Built: 1902
- Architectural style: Queen Anne
- NRHP reference No.: 84000564
- Added to NRHP: December 20, 1984

E. B. Ficklen House, also known as Buckingham, is a historic home located at Greenville, Pitt County, North Carolina. It was built in 1902, and is a two-story, Queen Anne style frame dwelling with an exaggerated hip roof. It features a circular corner tower capped by a conical roof, projecting gable, and complicated porch configuration including a first floor wraparound porch with three Ionic order columns.

It was added to the National Register of Historic Places in 1984. It is located in the Skinnerville-Greenville Heights Historic District.
