= USS Altamaha (CVE-18) =

Escort aircraft carrier in the U. S. Navy during World War II

- USS Altamaha in 1943

History

United States
- Laid down: 19 December 1941
- Launched: 22 May 1942
- Commissioned: 15 September 1942
- Decommissioned: 27 September 1946
- Fate: Sold for scrap, 1961

General characteristics
- Displacement: 7,886 tons
- Length: 492 ft (150 m)
- Beam: 69.5 ft (21.2 m)
- Draft: 25.5 ft (7.8 m)
- Speed: 16 knots (30 km/h)
- Complement: 970 officers and men
- Armament: 2 × 4"/50, 5"/38 or 5"/51 guns (2×1), 20 × 40 mm Bofors guns (10×2)
- Aircraft carried: 24

USS Altamaha (AVG-18/ACV-18/CVE-18) was a Bogue-class escort aircraft carrier in the United States Navy during World War II. She was named for the Altamaha River in Georgia.

Altamaha was laid down under a Maritime Commission contract (MC hull 235) on 19 December 1941 at Tacoma, Washington, by the Seattle-Tacoma Shipbuilding Corporation; launched on 25 May 1942; sponsored by Mrs. Thomas S. Combs, the wife of Commander Combs, who was the commanding officer of Casco, and commissioned on 15 September 1942 Captain J. R. Tate in command.

== Service history ==
Following brief sea trials, Altamaha got underway for San Diego, California, on 27 October in company with Kendrick. While they were en route, Kendrick spotted a submarine and claimed that members of her crew had seen three torpedoes which had been fired at the escort carrier. However, no one on Altamaha observed any of the torpedoes. The voyage continued uneventfully, and the ships reached San Diego on 31 October. The carrier then took on aircraft and passengers and sailed in convoy on 3 November for the southwest Pacific.

Upon reaching Espiritu Santo on 22 November, she delivered part of her cargo and departed on 27 November for New Caledonia. She reached Nouméa on 28 November and commenced a period of flight operations and training exercises. The vessel returned to Espiritu Santo on 30 December, but continued on to the Fiji Islands and touched at Nadi on 13 January 1943 before beginning another period of operational training.

In early February, Altamaha paused off Funafuti, Ellice Islands; loaded cargo and personnel on to barges and sent them ashore. The carrier then proceeded to Hawaii and arrived at Pearl Harbor on 10 February. There, the planes and personnel of Air Group 11 came on board, and the ship set a course for the Fiji Islands on 19 February. She reached Nadi on 28 February, discharged her cargo, and reversed her course back toward the Hawaiian Islands.

After a short stay in port at Pearl Harbor, the escort carrier got underway on 9 March with replacement aircraft for the flattops of the Pacific Fleet. She paused at Palmyra Island on 15 March, continued on to Johnston Island debarked marine aviation personnel on 17 March, and touched at Midway Atoll three days later before reversing course and returning to Hawaii. She remained at Pearl Harbor for one day, 23 March, and then continued on to the West Coast.

Altamaha reached San Diego on 1 April and commenced three and one-half months of flight operations off the California coast alternated with upkeep in San Diego. On 13 July, she arrived at Alameda, California, to take on planes from the naval air station there. The escort carrier got underway for Australia three days later and made Brisbane on 3 August. Following a 10-day visit to Fremantle, Western Australia, she got underway on 16 August for India and arrived at Karachi on 28 August and delivered 29 Army Air Force airplanes.

On 2 September, the escort carrier reversed her course and steamed back to Australia. She reached Melbourne on 18 September and, at the end of three days there in a leave and upkeep status got underway for the West Coast of the United States. On 8 October, the vessel entered the Mare Island Navy Yard, Vallejo, California, for overhaul.

The escort carrier got underway for sea trials on 8 November paused briefly at Alameda to take on replacement aircraft, and sailed on 13 November for Brisbane. Altamaha reached her destination on 30 November and began discharging her cargo. The ship left there on 4 December to return home. Upon her arrival at San Diego on 21 December, she began a period of local operations carrier qualifications, and repairs. During refueling operations off San Diego, blimp K-29 of USN Airship Patrol Squadron 31 (ZP-31) made the first carrier landing by a non-rigid airship on the deck of CVE Altamaha on 4 February 1944.

The ship got underway for Pearl Harbor on 22 March 1944 arrived there on 28 March, and began taking on Composite Squadron 6 for transportation to an operating area 300 miles east of the Marshall Islands. The carrier had been selected to be the nucleus of Task Group 11.1 (TG 11.1), and left Hawaii in company with four destroyer escorts on 30 March. The warships reached their assigned area on 3 April and began their first patrol. The group reported contacting two submarines but did not receive credit for damaging or destroying either. The task group put into Majuro Atoll on 8 April to allow the destroyer escorts to refuel.

The ships sailed on 11 April to carry out a second anti-submarine warfare mission. Altamaha was the target of a torpedo attack on 15 April but successfully evaded all four shots. The remainder of the patrol passed uneventfully before TG 11.1 was relieved on 18 April and shaped a course for Pearl Harbor. Following a short upkeep period in Hawaiian waters, the carrier returned to Majuro in early May and operated in an antisubmarine screen off the Marshall Islands for several days before returning to Pearl Harbor on 11 May.

After a two-day layover in Hawaii, Altamaha pushed on toward the West Coast. Reaching Alameda on 18 May, she entered the shipyard of the United Engineering Company for repairs and alterations. She resumed operations on the last day in May and headed for Hawaii, laden with aircraft and spare parts.

Having delivered her cargo at Pearl Harbor, Altamaha returned to Alameda. From there, she proceeded to San Diego which she reached on 19 June and spent two days loading men and equipment before departing California on 21 June, bound for the New Hebrides. She reached Espiritu Santo on 7 July, discharged cargo and, on 12 July, headed for Morobe, New Guinea, where she arrived on 16 July. Having made additional calls at Langemak, New Guinea, and Seeadler Harbor, Manus Island, Altamaha arrived back at Espiritu Santo on the 25th. She made one more cruise from this island, during which she visited Seeadler Harbor and Guadalcanal. The carrier departed the New Hebrides on 10 August bound for Hawaii.

Altamaha paused at Pearl Harbor for two days and then sailed on to San Diego. She spent four days there before getting underway and setting course for Pearl Harbor. She departed Hawaiian waters on 8 September, made port calls at Emirau Island and Seeadler Harbor, and returned to San Diego, where she arrived on 6 October. The vessel next spent three weeks in local operations before getting underway on 26 October for another voyage west.

The escort carrier paused at Pearl Harbor for three days, then sailed for Eniwetok with replacement aircraft and pilots. On 15 November, she reached Ulithi and then carried out flight operations off Ulithi through 14 December, when she got underway for the 3rd Fleet replenishment area. On 16 December, the ship joined TG 30.8 in the Philippine Sea and, the next day, began transferring pilots to Buchanan. However, heavy seas compelled her to break off that task. By early morning on 18 December, the disturbance had grown into a raging typhoon. By 0900, the escort carrier was laboring heavily and rolling as much as 25-30 degrees to either side. An hour later, visibility dropped to zero, and the vessel abandoned all effort to keep station. Almost one-half of the aircraft on board Altamaha broke loose and plunged overboard. The ship also experienced problems with flooding in the forward elevator pit. By 1600, the weather was improving and the ship rode better. Soon she made a rendezvous with other members of TG 30.8.

While the carrier sustained considerable material damage, she suffered no personnel casualties and was able to resume her resupply operations on 19 December. Altamaha continued her operations with the replenishment group through early February 1945. During this time, she serviced 3rd Fleet units in Philippine waters and made port calls at Guam, Manus and Ulithi. On 15 February, the ship touched at Pearl Harbor.

Altamaha continued on to the West Coast, arriving at Alameda on 26 February. The ship began an availability at the Hunters Point Navy Yard on 3 March during which she was dry-docked for routine work below the waterline and repairs to a propeller damaged in the typhoon. The carrier emerged from the yard on 14 March and began loading planes, ammunition, and supplies for transportation to Pearl Harbor.

During the remaining months of World War II, Altamaha provided general transportation service from Alameda, San Diego, and Pearl Harbor to various points in the Pacific. Among her stops were Guam, Saipan, Eniwetok, Kossol Roads and Samar. Following the Japanese capitulation in mid-August Altamaha returned to the West Coast for repairs and an overhaul at the Hunters Point Navy Yard. She began sea trials in mid-October and got underway for Pearl Harbor on the 22nd. The vessel was then assigned to the "Magic-Carpet" fleet and transported armed forces personnel and equipment throughout the Pacific back to the United States.

On 15 January 1946, Altamaha headed to Tacoma, Washington. Deactivation preparations were begun there, and the carrier was placed out of commission, in reserve, on 27 September 1946. The ship was redesignated CVHE-18 on 12 June 1955. Her name was struck from the Naval Vessel Register on 1 March 1959, and the vessel was sold on 25 April 1961 to Eisenberg & Co., New York City, N.Y., and, later that year, was scrapped in Japan.

== Awards ==
- Altamaha won one battle star for her World War II service.
