= Dickinson Avenue Historic District =

Historic district in North Carolina, United States

- U.S. National Register of Historic Places
- U.S. Historic district
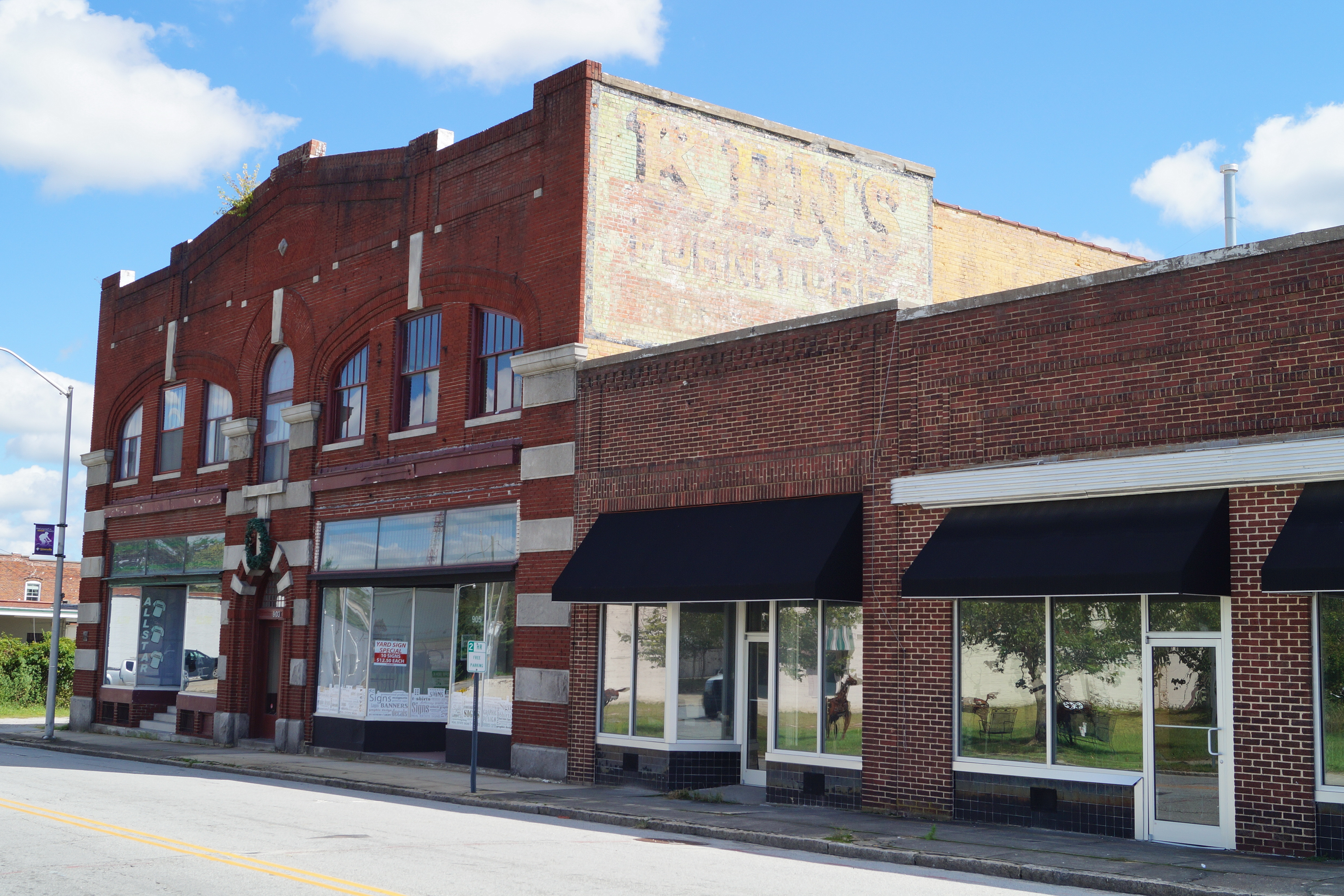
- Dickinson Avenue Historic District, September 2014

- Location within North Carolina Location within the United States
- Location: 600-900 Blocks of Dickinson Ave., W. Eighth St., Ficklen St., S. Pitt St., Clark St., Atlantic Ave., and Albemarle Ave.
- Coordinates: 35°36′27″N 77°22′47″W
- Area: 12 acres (4.9 ha)
- Built: 1902
- Architect: Blauwelt, H.J.
- Architectural style: Early Commercial, Classical Revival
- NRHP reference No.: 07000092
- Added to NRHP: March 1, 2007

Dickinson Avenue Historic District is a national historic district located at Greenville, Pitt County, North Carolina. The district encompasses 35 contributing buildings and 3 contributing structures in a mixed commercial and industrial section of Greenville. It includes buildings dated from about 1902 to 1956 and notable examples of Classical Revival and Commercial architecture. Notable buildings include the Brown Building (c. 1916), Hines Building (c. 1916), First Christian Church (1916), Roxy Theater (1948), and the Imperial Tobacco Company factory (1902-1964).

It was listed on the National Register of Historic Places in 2007.
