= Jones–Lee House =

Historic house in North Carolina, United States

- U.S. National Register of Historic Places
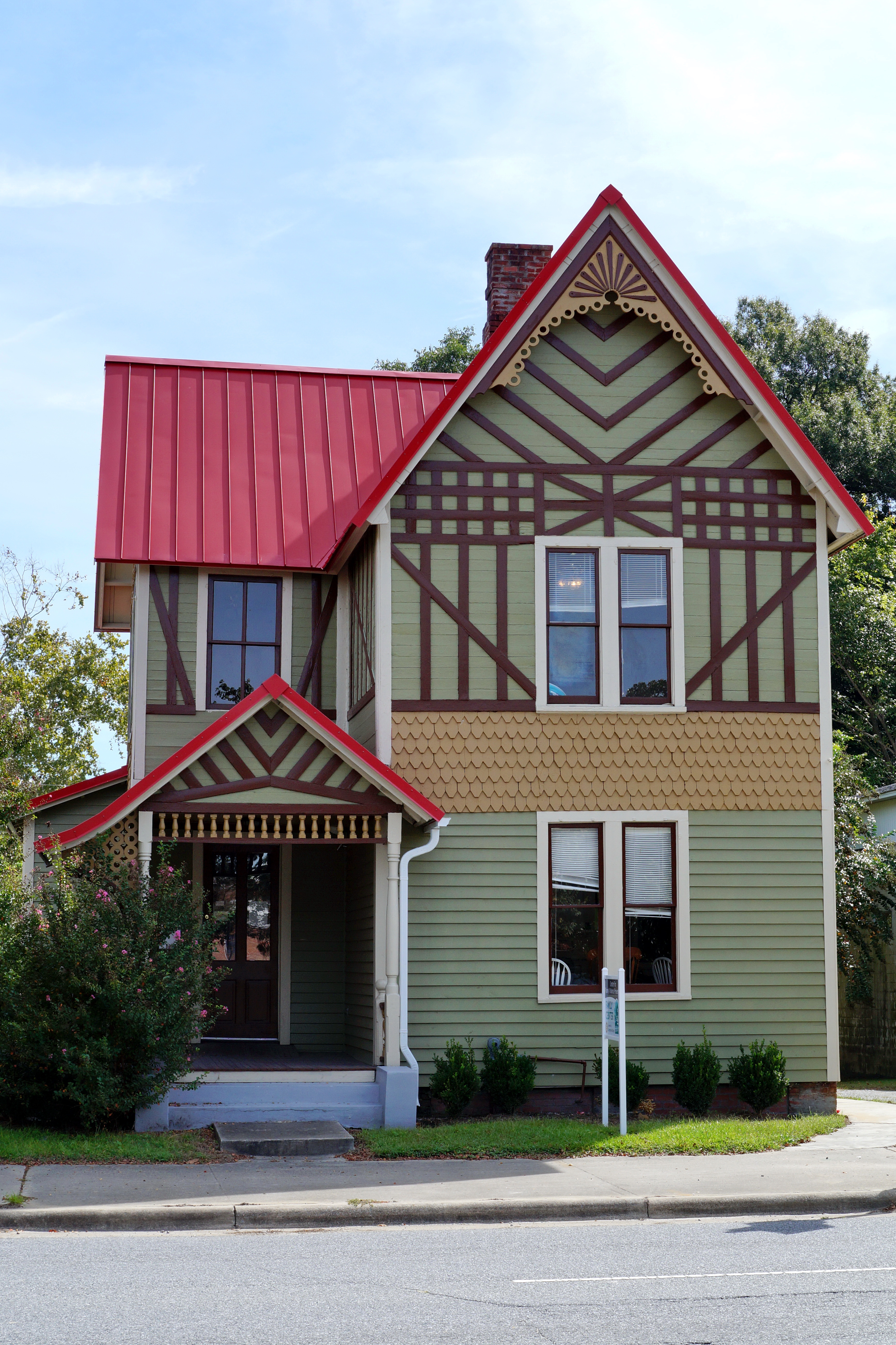
- Jones–Lee House, September 2014

- Location within North Carolina Location within the United States
- Interactive map showing the location of Jones-Lee House
- Location: 805 E. Evans St., Greenville, North Carolina
- Coordinates: 35°36′27″N 77°22′29″W
- Area: less than one acre
- Built: 1895
- Built by: Munford, Charles T.
- Architectural style: Queen Anne
- NRHP reference No.: 80002894
- Added to NRHP: November 25, 1980

Jones–Lee House is a historic home located at Greenville, Pitt County, North Carolina, US. It was built in 1895, and is a two-story, "L"-plan, frame dwelling with Queen Anne style decorative elements. It has an intersecting gable roof and one-story, gable roofed porch. It features decorative shingles, curvilinear sawnwork, and applied half-timbering.

It was added to the National Register of Historic Places in 1980.
