= Greenville, North Carolina =

City in Pitt County, Colorado, U.S.

- City
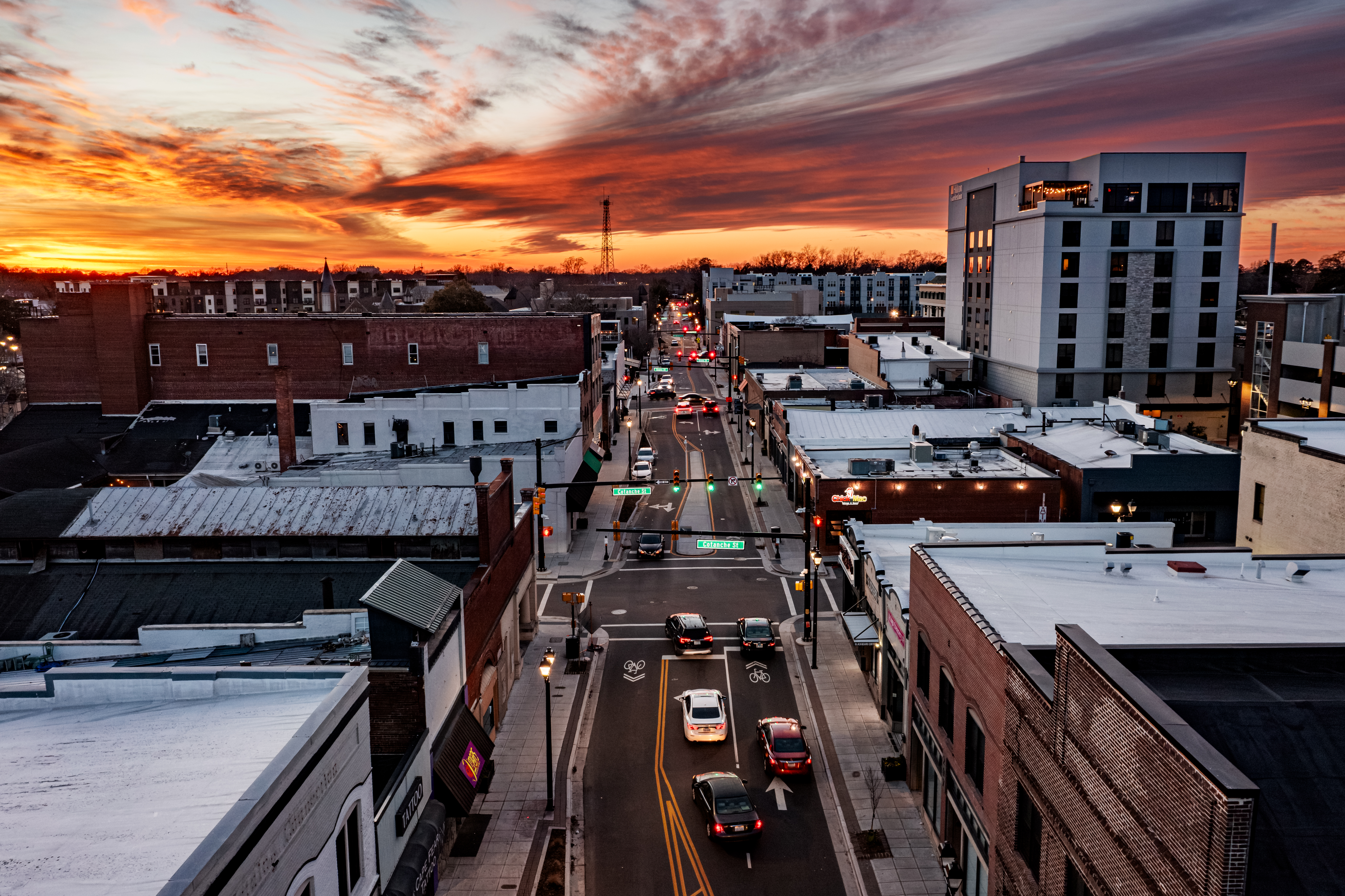
- Downtown Greenville in 2026

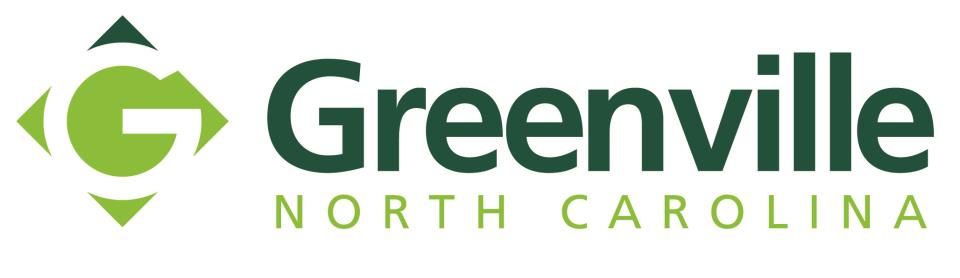
- Flag Seal Logo
- Nicknames: The Emerald City, G-Vegas
- Motto: "Find Yourself in Good Company"
- Location within North Carolina Location within the United States
- Coordinates: 35°35′40″N 77°22′34″W
- Country: United States
- State: North Carolina
- County: Pitt
- Settled: 1771
- Founded: 1774 (Martinsborough)
- Founded: 1786 (Greenville)
- Named for: Nathanael Greene

Government
  - Type: Council–manager
  - Mayor: P.J. Connelly (Republican Party)

Area
  - Total: 38.20 sq mi (98.95 km^{2})
  - Land: 37.44 sq mi (96.97 km^{2})
  - Water: 0.76 sq mi (1.98 km^{2}) 1.99%
- Elevation: 26 ft (7.9 m)

Population (2020)
  - Total: 87,521
  - Estimate (2025): 96,184
  - Rank: 12th in North Carolina
  - Density: 2,337.6/sq mi (902.55/km^{2})
  - Urban: 120,150 (US: 280th)
  - Urban density: 1,810/sq mi (698.9/km^{2})
  - Metro: 175,119 (US: 252nd)
- Demonym: Greenvillian
- Time zone: UTC−5 (EST)
  - Summer (DST): UTC−4 (EDT)
- ZIP codes: 27833, 27834, 27835, 27836, 27858
- Area code: 252
- FIPS code: 37-28080
- GNIS feature ID: 2403753
- Interstate Highways: I-587
- Website: www.greenvillenc.gov

Greenville (/ˈɡriːnvɪl/ GREEN-vil; locally /ˈɡriːnvəl/ GREEN-vəl) is the county seat of and the most populous city in Pitt County, North Carolina, United States. As of the 2020 census, the population was 87,521. Greenville's estimated 2025 population is 96,184. It is the principal city of the Greenville, N.C., Metropolitan Statistical Area, and the 12th-most populous city in North Carolina. Greenville is the health, entertainment, and educational hub of North Carolina's Tidewater and Coastal Plain. The city has been experiencing an economic and population boom since the 1990s.

Many major companies have moved their regional, national, and international headquarters to Greenville. Companies include Grady-White Boats, Hyster-Yale Materials Handling, Thermo Fisher Scientific, Catalent, and Avient, among others. Greenville is the home of East Carolina University, the fourth-largest university in the University of North Carolina System, and ECU Health Medical Center, the second largest hospital in North Carolina and the flagship hospital for ECU Health and the teaching hospital for the Brody School of Medicine.

== History ==
=== Founding ===
Greenville formed in 1771 as "Martinsborough", named after the Royal Governor Josiah Martin. In 1774 the town was moved to its present location on the south bank of the Tar River, three miles (4.8 km) west of its original site. In 1786, the name was changed to Greenesville in honor of General Nathanael Greene, the American Revolutionary War hero. It was later shortened to Greenville.

=== 19th century ===
During Greenville's early years, the Tar River was a navigable waterway, and by the 1860s there were several established steamboat lines transporting passengers and goods on the river. Cotton was the leading agricultural crop, and Greenville became a major cotton export center. Before the turn of the century, however, tobacco surpassed cotton and became the leading money crop. Greenville became one of the state's leading tobacco marketing and warehouse centers.

=== 20th century ===
For over a century, Greenville was recognized only as an important tobacco market and the home of a small state-supported college, chartered by the Legislature in March 1907 and named East Carolina Teacher's Training School, a co-ed institution. By the mid-1960s, East Carolina College had become the third-largest state-supported college, and enrollment approached 8,000 students—twice the 1960 enrollment figure. In 1967, it became East Carolina University. ECU Medical School admitted its first four-year class in 1977. At the turn of the century, enrollment at ECU topped the 18,000 mark, and now exceeds 29,000 students.

Greenville's current economic development began in 1963 when Empire Brush was recruited to the new Greenville Industrial Park, established by Greenville Industries, Inc. (a for-profit land holding company) in partnership with the Pitt County Development Commission (established by a voter referendum in 1957) and Greenville Utilities Commission. One of the community's greatest successes came in 1968 when Burroughs Wellcome, a major pharmaceutical research and manufacturing firm, located a pharmaceutical development/manufacturing facility near the city. The site is now owned by Patheon, a Thermo Fisher Scientific company, which employs approximately 1,200 people. The city and Pitt County have also become home to many other major industries and businesses including Catalent, Attindas, Grady-White Boats, and Hyster-Yale Materials Handling.

==== Hurricane Floyd ====
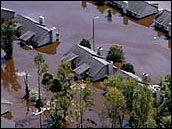
Tar River flooding homes after Hurricane Floyd

In September 1999, Hurricane Floyd made landfall in eastern North Carolina, dropping nearly 17 inches (430 mm) of rain during the hours of its passage. Many residents were not aware of the flooding until the water came into their homes. Most localized flooding happened overnight, and the Tar River suffered the worst flooding, exceeding 500-year flood levels along its lower stretches. An additional 20+ inches of rain had fallen prior in the month from the two passes of Hurricane Dennis.

Damages in Pitt County alone were estimated at $1.6 billion (1999 USD, $1.87 billion 2006 USD). Some residents in Greenville had to swim six feet underwater to reach the front doors of their homes and apartments. Due to the heavy flooding in downtown Greenville, the East Carolina Pirates were forced to relocate their football game against #9 Miami to N.C. State's Carter–Finley Stadium in Raleigh, where they beat the Hurricanes 27–23.

=== 21st century ===
In 2017, Greenville signed an agreement with Yeonsu District in South Korea to become sister cities.

== Geography ==
According to the United States Census Bureau, the city has a total area of 38.20 square miles (98.9 km^{2}), of which 37.44 square miles (97.0 km^{2}) is land and 0.76 square miles (2.0 km^{2}) (1.99%) is water. It is located in the inner Coastal Plain.

=== Climate ===
Greenville has a humid subtropical climate, which is characterized by hot and sweltering summers, and mild to cool winters, with temperatures rarely dropping below freezing. Greenville can be prone to cold weather, as the temperature was once recorded as −4 °F (−20 °C), which is 36 below freezing. The summers are very hot, with temperatures averaging in the 90s, with nights in the mid-70s. The city is also prone to hot weather, as every summer month once recorded a record-high temperature of 100 °F (38 °C) or more.

Climate data for Greenville, North Carolina (1991–2020 normals, extremes 1897–present)
Month	Jan	Feb	Mar	Apr	May	Jun	Jul	Aug	Sep	Oct	Nov	Dec	Year
Record high °F (°C)	82 (28)	84 (29)	91 (33)	96 (36)	100 (38)	103 (39)	104 (40)	104 (40)	104 (40)	98 (37)	88 (31)	82 (28)	104 (40)
Mean maximum °F (°C)	74.2 (23.4)	76.5 (24.7)	82.3 (27.9)	87.2 (30.7)	92.4 (33.6)	96.3 (35.7)	97.7 (36.5)	96.0 (35.6)	92.3 (33.5)	87.0 (30.6)	80.0 (26.7)	74.6 (23.7)	99.1 (37.3)
Mean daily maximum °F (°C)	53.2 (11.8)	56.9 (13.8)	64.0 (17.8)	73.5 (23.1)	80.5 (26.9)	87.4 (30.8)	90.4 (32.4)	88.4 (31.3)	83.1 (28.4)	74.1 (23.4)	64.2 (17.9)	56.4 (13.6)	72.7 (22.6)
Daily mean °F (°C)	43.1 (6.2)	45.9 (7.7)	52.6 (11.4)	61.8 (16.6)	69.6 (20.9)	77.3 (25.2)	80.8 (27.1)	79.0 (26.1)	73.6 (23.1)	63.0 (17.2)	52.7 (11.5)	45.9 (7.7)	62.1 (16.7)
Mean daily minimum °F (°C)	33.0 (0.6)	34.9 (1.6)	41.1 (5.1)	50.0 (10.0)	58.8 (14.9)	67.2 (19.6)	71.3 (21.8)	69.7 (20.9)	64.2 (17.9)	51.9 (11.1)	41.2 (5.1)	35.4 (1.9)	51.6 (10.9)
Mean minimum °F (°C)	15.3 (−9.3)	20.3 (−6.5)	25.0 (−3.9)	33.4 (0.8)	44.0 (6.7)	54.5 (12.5)	62.7 (17.1)	59.9 (15.5)	51.5 (10.8)	35.9 (2.2)	26.0 (−3.3)	21.1 (−6.1)	13.7 (−10.2)
Record low °F (°C)	−4 (−20)	−2 (−19)	15 (−9)	22 (−6)	33 (1)	44 (7)	49 (9)	47 (8)	40 (4)	23 (−5)	14 (−10)	1 (−17)	−4 (−20)
Average precipitation inches (mm)	3.91 (99)	3.35 (85)	4.22 (107)	3.81 (97)	4.04 (103)	4.36 (111)	5.87 (149)	6.01 (153)	7.33 (186)	3.57 (91)	3.42 (87)	3.55 (90)	53.44 (1,357)
Average snowfall inches (cm)	1.6 (4.1)	0.8 (2.0)	0.1 (0.25)	0.0 (0.0)	0.0 (0.0)	0.0 (0.0)	0.0 (0.0)	0.0 (0.0)	0.0 (0.0)	0.0 (0.0)	0.0 (0.0)	0.8 (2.0)	3.3 (8.4)
Average precipitation days (≥ 0.01 in)	11.3	10.4	11.3	9.9	10.9	10.4	11.9	12.0	10.5	8.4	9.4	11.2	127.6
Average snowy days (≥ 0.1 in)	0.9	0.5	0.1	0.0	0.0	0.0	0.0	0.0	0.0	0.0	0.0	0.3	1.8
Source: NOAA

== Demographics ==
Historical population
Census	Pop.	Note	%±
1850	1,893		—
1860	828		−56.3%
1870	601		−27.4%
1880	912		51.7%
1890	1,937		112.4%
1900	2,565		32.4%
1910	4,101		59.9%
1920	5,772		40.7%
1930	9,194		59.3%
1940	12,674		37.9%
1950	16,724		32.0%
1960	22,860		36.7%
1970	29,063		27.1%
1980	35,740		23.0%
1990	44,972		25.8%
2000	60,476		34.5%
2010	84,554		39.8%
2020	87,521		3.5%
2023 (est.)	90,053		2.9%
U.S. Decennial Census

=== Racial and ethnic composition ===
Greenville, North Carolina – Racial and ethnic composition Note: the US Census treats Hispanic/Latino as an ethnic category. This table excludes Latinos from the racial categories and assigns them to a separate category. Hispanics/Latinos may be of any race.
Race / Ethnicity (NH = Non-Hispanic)	Pop 2000	Pop 2010	Pop 2020	% 2000	% 2010	% 2020
White alone (NH)	36,660	46,368	40,054	60.62%	54.84%	45.77%
Black or African American alone (NH)	20,531	31,010	35,833	33.95%	36.67%	40.94%
Native American or Alaska Native alone (NH)	171	265	256	0.28%	0.31%	0.29%
Asian alone (NH)	1,089	1,996	2,401	1.80%	2.36%	2.74%
Pacific Islander alone (NH)	22	31	50	0.04%	0.04%	0.06%
Some Other Race alone (NH)	95	154	494	0.16%	0.18%	0.56%
Mixed Race or Multi-Racial (NH)	664	1,547	3,357	1.10%	1.83%	3.84%
Hispanic or Latino (any race)	1,244	3,183	5,076	2.06%	3.76%	5.80%
Total	60,476	85,554	87,521	100.00%	100.00%	100.00%

=== 2020 census ===
As of the 2020 census, Greenville had a population of 87,521 across 38,001 households and 18,115 families. The median age was 30.5 years. 20.5% of residents were under the age of 18 and 12.3% of residents were 65 years of age or older. For every 100 females there were 84.0 males, and for every 100 females age 18 and over there were 79.7 males age 18 and over.

98.6% of residents lived in urban areas, while 1.4% lived in rural areas.

Of the city's 38,001 households, 26.4% had children under the age of 18 living in them. Of all households, 28.6% were married-couple households, 22.7% were households with a male householder and no spouse or partner present, and 41.1% were households with a female householder and no spouse or partner present. About 37.9% of all households were made up of individuals and 9.0% had someone living alone who was 65 years of age or older.

There were 45,147 housing units, of which 15.8% were vacant. The homeowner vacancy rate was 1.3% and the rental vacancy rate was 7.7%.

Racial composition as of the 2020 census
Race	Number	Percent
White	40,991	46.8%
Black or African American	36,197	41.4%
American Indian and Alaska Native	326	0.4%
Asian	2,416	2.8%
Native Hawaiian and Other Pacific Islander	54	0.1%
Some other race	2,741	3.1%
Two or more races	4,796	5.5%
Hispanic or Latino (of any race)	5,076	5.8%

=== 2010 census ===
At the 2010 census, there were 174,263 residents in the Greenville MSA, 130,204 households, and 110,997 residents residing within five miles (8.0 km) of the city limit. The population density was 2,364.6 inhabitants per square mile (913.0/km^{2}), making Greenville the densest city in Eastern North Carolina. There were 130,204 housing units at an average density of 1,100.4 per square mile (424.9/km^{2}). The racial composition of the city was: 60.20% White, 32.14% African American, 5.06% Hispanic or Latino American, 1.82% Asian American, 0.80% Native American, 0.04% Native Hawaiian or Other Pacific Islander, 1.01% some other race, and 1.29% two or more races.

There were 25,204 households, out of which 23.0% had children under the age of 18 living with them, 30.8% were married couples living together, 13.8% had a female householder with no husband present, and 52.4% were non-families. 35.4% of all households were made up of individuals, and 6.4% had someone living alone who was 65 years of age or older. The average household size was 2.18 and the average family size was 2.91.

In the city, the age distribution of the population showed 18.8% under the age of 18, 28.7% from 18 to 24, 28.2% from 25 to 44, 15.5% from 45 to 64, and 8.8% who were 65 years of age or older. The median age was 26 years. For every 100 females, there were 86.2 males. For every 100 females age 18 and over, there were 82.9 males.

The median income for a household in the city was $28,648, and the median income for a family was $44,491. Males had a median income of $31,847 versus $26,324 for females. The per capita income for the city was $18,476. About 15.6% of families and 26.1% of the population were below the poverty line, including 24.1% of those under age 18 and 20.4% of those age 65 or over.

=== Religion ===
The Roman Catholic community in Greenville has seen steady growth over the years, with the migration of Hispanic workers to the area, along with significant numbers of people from the Mid-Atlantic and northeastern United States who work for East Carolina University, the ECU Health, and other employers. There are two primary Catholic Parishes in Greenville including St. Gabriel of the Sorrowful Mother on Dickinson Avenue and St. Peter Catholic Church on East 4th Street. St. Gabriel's serves hundreds of Spanish speaking families and supports a Head Start program in the West Greenville area. St. Peter's Catholic Church in Greenville supports a day school for grades K-8. John Paul II Catholic High School supports grades 9–12.

Greenville's Jewish community has seen continued growth. Congregation Bayt Shalom, a congregation affiliated with both Reform Judaism and Conservative Judaism, was previously led by the first African-American female rabbi in the United States, Alysa Stanton.

== Economy ==
Biggest employers by headcount
#	Employer	Product	Employment
1	ECU Health	Healthcare	6,760
2	East Carolina University	Education	5,672
3	Pitt County Schools	Education	3,699
4	Hyster-Yale	Lift trucks	1,226
5	Thermo Fisher Scientific	Pharmaceuticals	1,261
6	City of Greenville	Government	1,132
7	Pitt Community College	Education	1,100
8	County of Pitt	Government	1,000
9	DENSO (formerly ASMO)	Small electric motors	722
10	Walmart	Department store	673
11	Mayne Pharma	Pharmaceuticals	629
12	Physicians East	Healthcare	615
13	Avient Protective Materials	Textiles	487
14	Greenville Utilities Commission	Public utilities	460
15	Attends Healthcare Products	Paper products	400
16	Grady-White Boats	Fiberglass boats	349

Greenville's economy is largely reliant on the local hospital system and East Carolina University. A diversified base of companies in advanced manufacturing, pharmaceuticals, life sciences, emerging technology, and food and beverage fuels the economy. MrBeast, Thermo Fisher Scientific, Avient, Catalent, Hyster-Yale Materials Handling, and Weyerhaeuser are among a long list of companies that call Greenville home. In 2024, the North Carolina Department of Commerce announced that two international companies selected Greenville for their first United States based manufacturing locations. Boviet Solar, a Vietnamese renewable energy company, committed to creating 908 new jobs and investing more than $294 million to locate its first North American solar panel manufacturing facility in the City of Greenville. Nipro Medical Corporation, a Japanese healthcare and medical device company, will create 232 jobs and invest more than $397.8 million to build a new manufacturing campus and U.S. headquarters in Greenville.

Minges Bottling Group, a large Pepsi bottling and distribution facility, is also located just outside Greenville in Ayden. Greenville is also home to The HammockSource, the world's largest hammock manufacturer.

The largest employer is ECU Health (formerly Vidant Medical Center) and the second largest is East Carolina University with specialized manufacturing and scientific industries augmenting the employment portfolio.

== Arts and culture ==
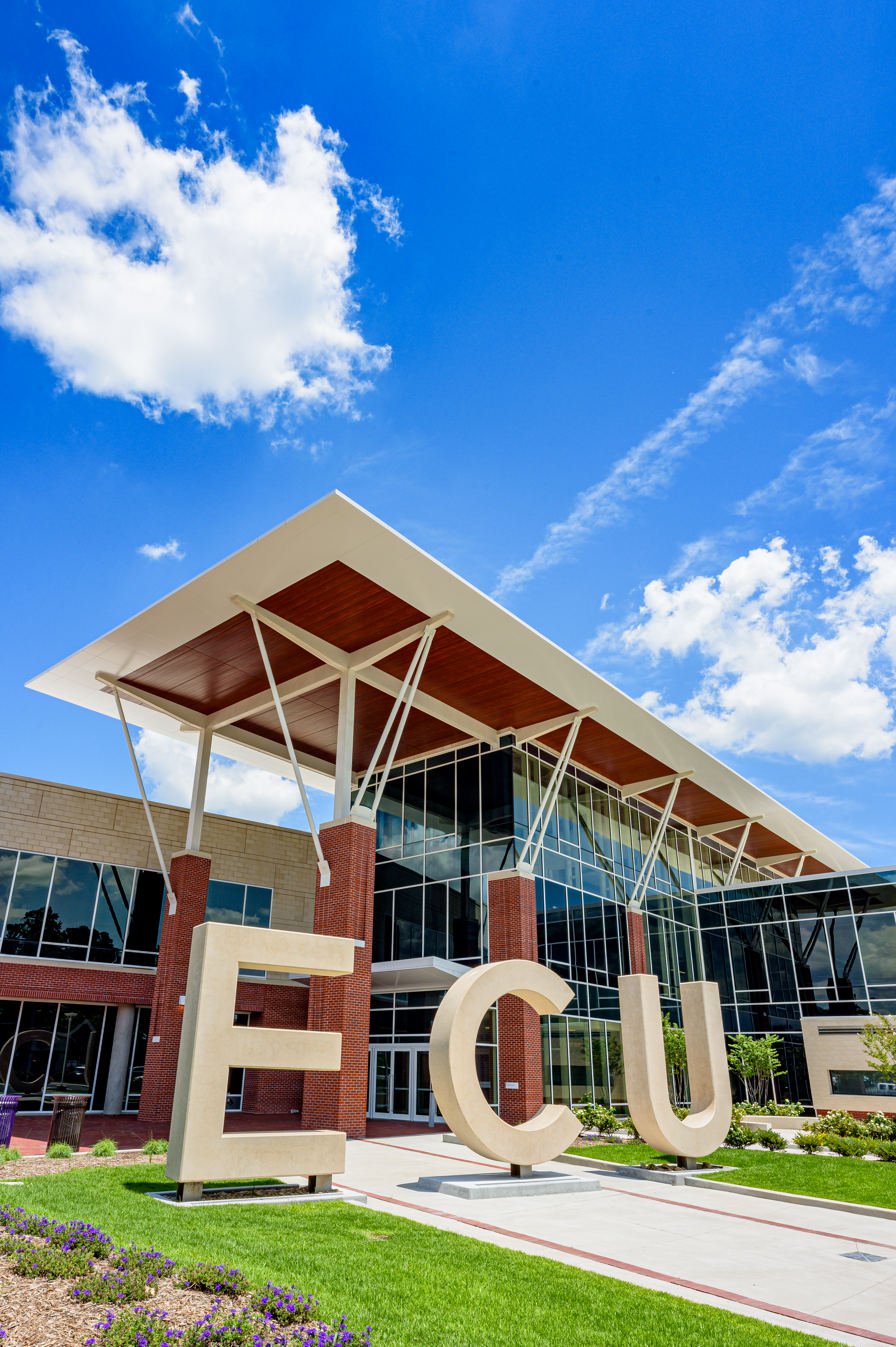
ECU Student Center

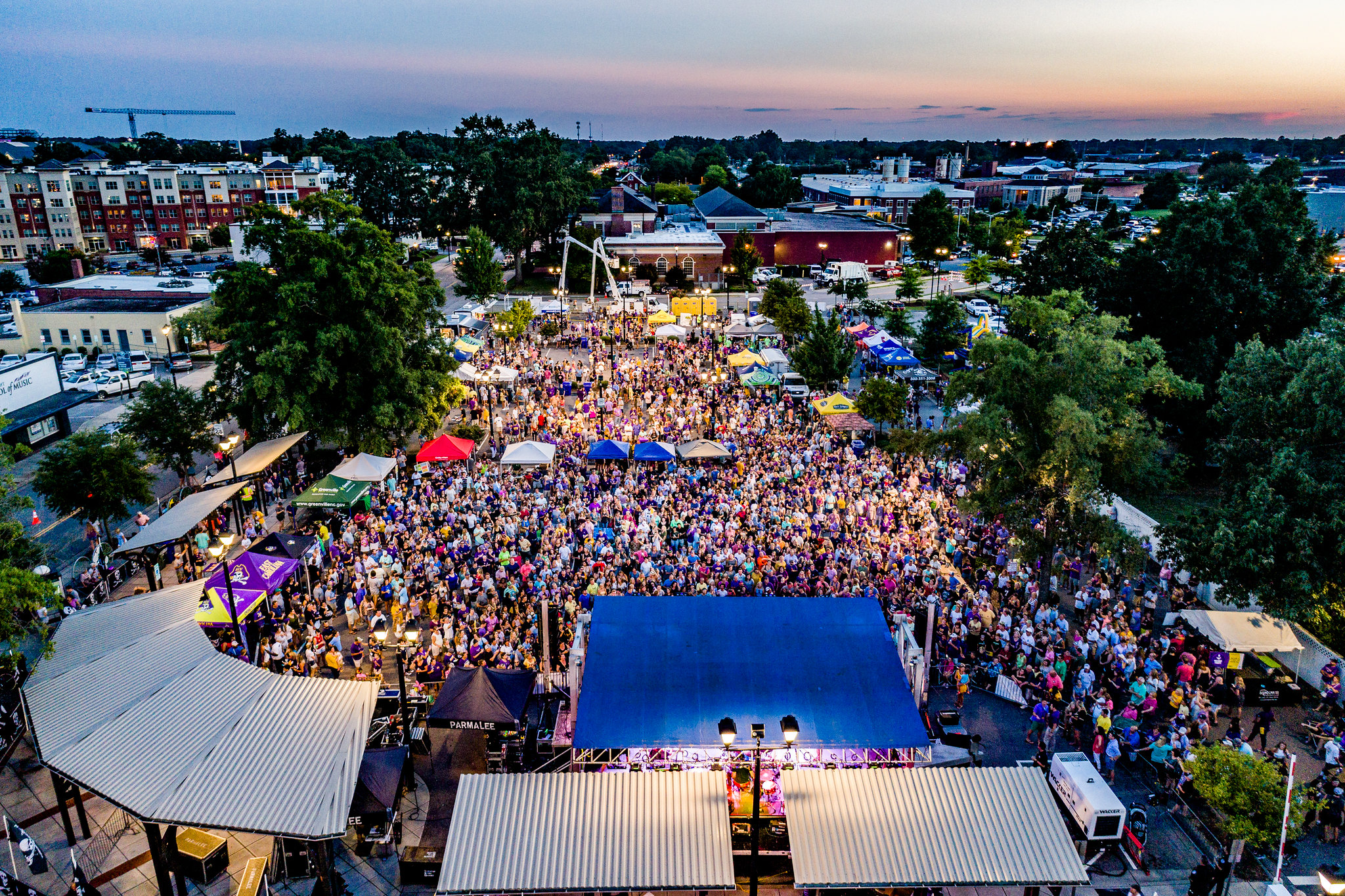
Thousands gather for a Freeboot Friday concert in Uptown.

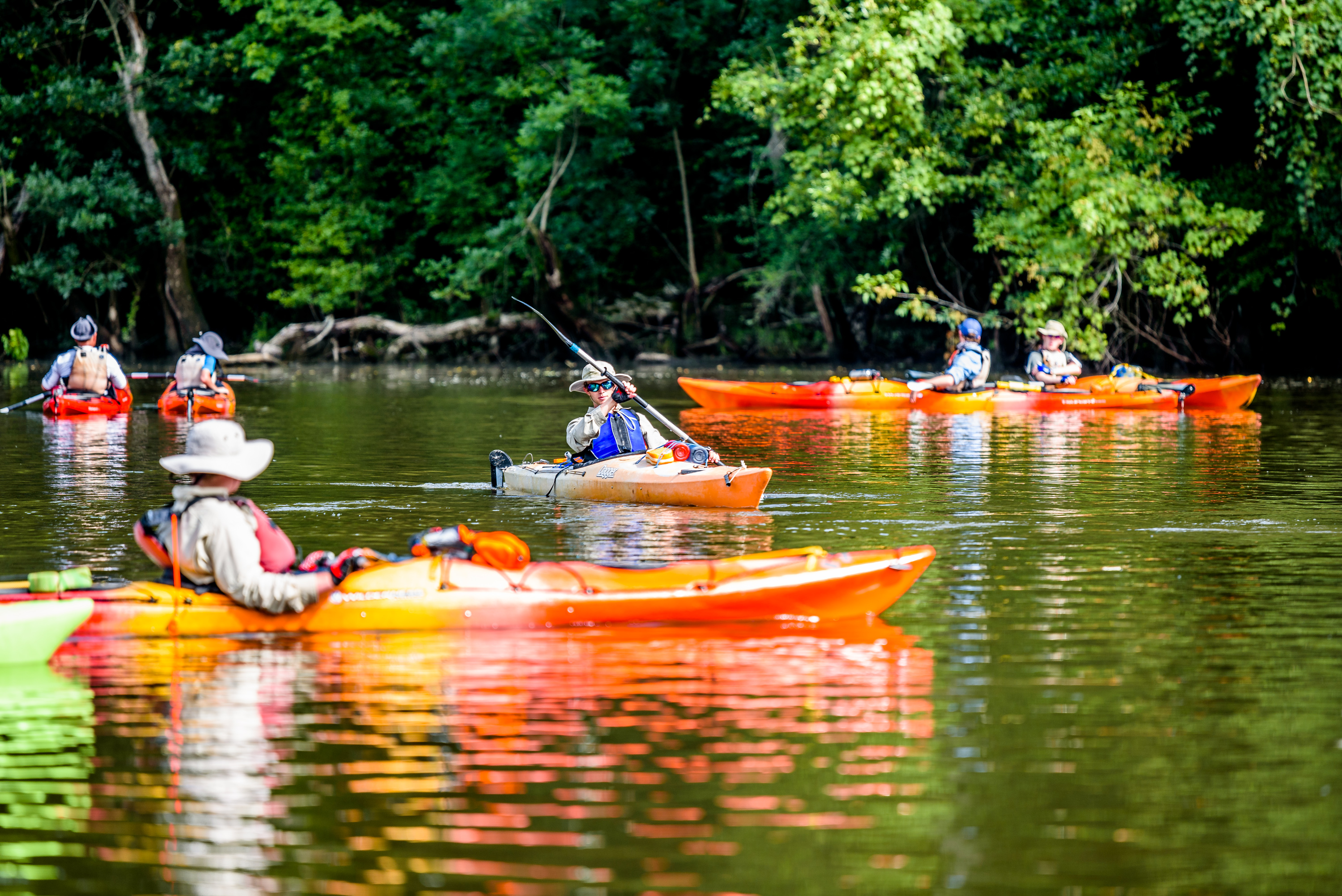
Kayaking the Tar River

East Carolina University offers musical concerts, theatrical and dance productions, travel films, and lectures. The Greenville Museum of Art contains local art, as well as rotating exhibitions. Annually over 3,000 children participate in programs offered by the museum and over 12,000 people visit the museum.

Greenville is the regional shopping destination for the Inner Banks area, since many big-box retailers and specialty shops are located in the city. Large centers include Greenville Mall (formerly Colonial Mall Greenville and Pitt Plaza originally), University Commons, Lynncroft and Arlington Village. La Promenade, La Promenade II, Arlington Village, and Arlington Plaza located within Greenville Blvd, Arlington Blvd, and Red Banks Rd is one of the biggest outdoor/strip mall-type shopping locations in Greenville, housing over 60 shops and restaurants. A new development called 11 Galleria, on the site of the former Carolina East Mall, features a number of big-box retailers. This new shopping center will contain a total of 400,000 sq ft (37,000 m^{2}).

=== Historic sites ===
The College View Historic District, Dickinson Avenue Historic District, E. B. Ficklen House, James L. Fleming House, Greenville Commercial Historic District, Greenville Tobacco Warehouse Historic District, Greenwreath, Robert Lee Humber House, Jones-Lee House, William H. Long House, Jesse R. Moye House, Oakmont, Pitt County Courthouse, Skinnerville-Greenville Heights Historic District, and U.S. Post Office are listed on the National Register of Historic Places.

== Sports ==
ECU's sports teams, nicknamed the Pirates, compete in NCAA Division I FBS as a full-member of the American Athletic Conference. Facilities include the 50,000 seat Dowdy–Ficklen Stadium for football, the 8,000-seat Williams Arena at Minges Coliseum for men's and women's basketball, and the Clark-LeClair Stadium, with a seating capacity of 3,000 (max capacity of 6,000+ when including outfield "Jungle" areas) for baseball. In 2010 a state of the art, Lady Pirates softball stadium with a seating capacity of 1,500 has been completed, neighboring a new ECU track and field facility and soccer stadium plus an Olympic sports coach's offices and team rooms facility are in varying stages of completion all along Charles Boulevard, the main entry way for all Pirate sports.

Olympic gold medalist Mark Lenzi coached the East Carolina University Pirate Men's and Women's diving teams until his death in 2012.

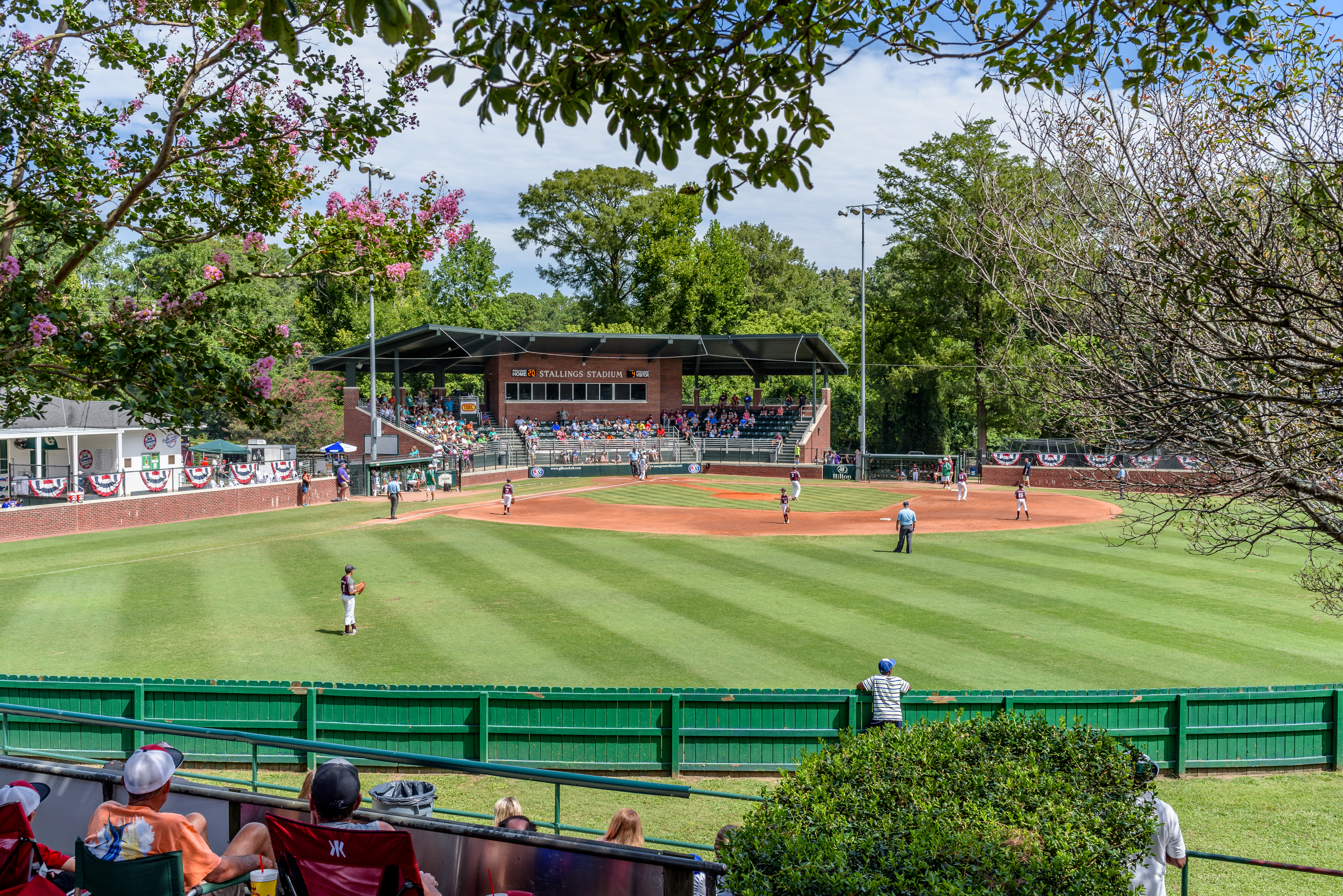
Stallings Stadium at Elm Street Park

Greenville has a strong tradition in Little League Baseball. Greenville Little Leagues was founded in 1951 and has two leagues; North State and Tar Heel. In 1998, a team from Greenville represented the South Region in the Little League World Series. They made it to the semi-finals, where they lost to eventual champion, Toms River, New Jersey. In 2017, Greenville again represented the Southeast region in the Little League World Series. In this run, the pitchers threw a combined perfect game, followed by a no-hitter, the first US team to throw back-to-back no hitters. They made it to the United States Championship Game, where they were eliminated by Lufkin, Texas.

Stallings Stadium at Elm Street Park is home to Little League baseball in Greenville. Along with Little League success, Greenville teams have also won multiple Babe Ruth Baseball titles. Since 2006, Greenville has sent Babe Ruth baseball teams to Southeast Regional competition each year in two different age groups, with two teams reaching the Babe Ruth World Series; the '06 15 yr. old team, and the '08 13 yr. old team. The 2006 team became the first Greenville Babe Ruth team to reach the World Series in 30 years, along with becoming the first Babe Ruth team to ever win a World Series game, defeating Clifton Park, New York 12–0. In 2012, the 13u Greenville All-Stars advanced to the Babe Ruth League World Series. The 2012 squad advanced to the championship game, falling to Bryant, Arkansas 4–3.

Greenville is home to the Greenville United Football Club, which joined the National Premier Soccer League on January 16, 2023. Greenville United FC games are currently played at John Paul II Catholic High School.

Greenville was home to minor league baseball. The Greenville Greenies was the primary moniker of the Greenville teams. Greenville played as members of the Eastern Carolina League (1928–1929) and Coastal Plain League (1934–1941, 1946–1951). The Greenville Greenies were an affiliate of the Washington Senators in 1939. The teams played at Guy Smith Stadium beginning in 1941. Previously, they played at Elm Street Park and Third Street Park.

Sports Tourism is a huge economic driver for Greenville and Pitt County, with the effort being spearheaded by the Greenville-Pitt County Sports Commission (Play Greenville, NC Sports). The Sports Commission has helped secure such national events as NCAA Championships, and starting in 2021, Greenville is the home of the Little League Softball World Series.

== Government ==
=== City Council ===
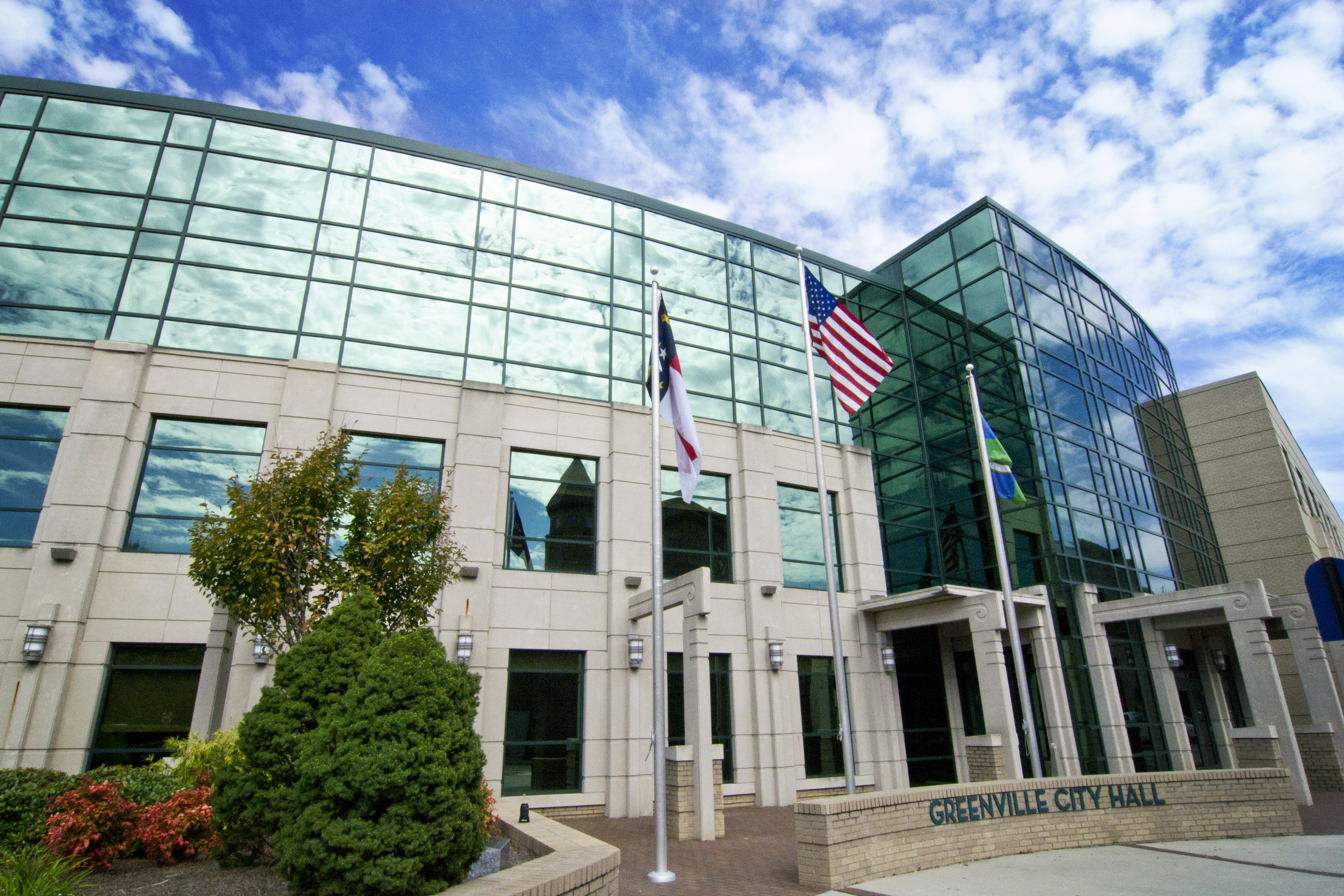
Greenville City Hall

Greenville has a council–manager form of government. The Greenville City Council is the governing body of the city.

Five of the council members serve individual districts and the sixth is elected by the entire city and serves at-large, much like the mayor. The mayor is P.J. Connelly.

=== State representatives ===
The city of Greenville has 3 members of the North Carolina General Assembly that represent their citizens. They are represented by Kandie Smith in the 5th Senate district in the North Carolina Senate, and by Gloristine Brown in the 8th House district and by Timothy Reeder in the 9th House district in the North Carolina House of Representatives.

Greenville is also represented by Greg Murphy in the 3rd congressional district. Greenville – along with Pitt County – was formerly split between the 3rd and 1st districts, but for the 119th United States Congress that began in 2025 (the elections for which happened in November 2024), all of Pitt County including Greenville was redistricted into the 3rd district. As of January 2026, the proposed next redistricting of North Carolina (to take effect for the 120th United States Congress to begin in 2027) would keep Pitt County entirely in the 3rd district.

== Education ==
All Greenville schools fall under the Pitt County Schools (PCS) administration. PCS formed in 1985 when Pitt County Schools and Greenville City Schools merged. The 9-member Board of Education oversees all Greenville and Pitt County schools. In July 2013, Dr. Ethan Lenker was named Pitt County Schools Superintendent. As of 2022, there are 13 elementary schools, five middle schools, six traditional high schools, two early college high schools, and the Health Sciences Academy in Pitt County. There are also ten private schools.

=== Elementary schools ===
- Ayden Elementary School (K–5)
- Belvoir Elementary School (K–5)
- Bethel School (K–8)
- Chicod Elementary School (PreK–5)
- Creekside Elementary School (K–5)
- Eastern Elementary School (K–5)
- Elmhurst Elementary School (K–5)
- Falkland Elementary School (K–5)
- G.R. Whitfield School (K–8)
- Grifton School (K–8)
- H.B Sugg Elementary School (Previous (K–12) now (pK–2))
- Lakeforest Elementary School (K–5)
- Northwest Elementary School (K–5)
- Pactolus Elementary School (K–8)
- Ridgewood Elementary School (K–5)
- Sam D. Bundy Elementary School (3–5)
- South Greenville Elementary School (K–5)
- Stokes Elementary School (K–8)
- Wahl-Coates Elementary School (K–5)
- W.H. Robinson Elementary School (K–5)
- Wintergreen Primary School (K–2)
- Wintergreen Intermediate School (3–5)

=== Middle schools ===
- A.G. Cox Middle School (6–8)
- Ayden Middle School (6–8)
- Chicod Middle School
- C.M. Eppes Middle School (6–8)
- E.B. Aycock Middle School (6–8)
- Farmville Middle School (6–8)
- Hope Middle School (6–8)
- Wellcome Middle School (6–8)

=== Public High schools ===
- Ayden-Grifton High School (9–12)
- D. H. Conley High School (9–12)
- Farmville Central High School (9–12)
- Junius H. Rose High School (9–12)
- North Pitt High School (9–12)
- South Central High School (9–12)

=== Higher learning ===
- East Carolina University
- Miller-Motte Technical College
- Pitt Community College
- Shaw University (satellite campus)

=== Private schools ===
- Pope John Paul II Catholic High School (9–12)

== Media ==
=== Newspapers and publications ===
The Daily Reflector serves as the main daily newspaper and is Greenville's oldest business. Other notable newspapers that serve the city include G-Vegas Magazine, The Greenville Times, The East Carolinian, Her Magazine, The Minority Voice and Viva Greenville.

=== Radio stations serving Greenville ===
- 1070 AM – WNCT Beach, Boogie & Blues
- 1250 AM – WGHB Sports
- 1340 AM – WOOW Gospel
- 1570 AM – WECU Sports
- 91.3 FM – WZMB East Carolina University
- 92.1 FM – WRSV Urban Station
- 93.3 FM – WERO Top 40 – All The Hits
- 97.5 FM – WLGT Contemporary Christian
- 101.9 FM – WIKS Hip Hop
- 103.7 FM – WTIB Talk
- 104.5 FM – WSTK The Vine Connection – Tradition Gospel Music
- 106.9 FM – WBIS-LPFM Traditional gospel & Christian music
- 107.9 FM – WNCT Adult Contemporary
- 99.5 FM – WMJV Hot Adult Contemporary

=== Television stations licensed in Greenville ===
- WNCT-TV 9 – (CBS with The CW on DT2)
- WYDO-TV 14 – (Roar)
- WUNK-TV 19 – (PBS member station, part of the PBS North Carolina Network)
- WEPX-TV 38 – (Ion Television)

=== Other television stations serving Greenville ===
- WITN-TV 7 – Washington (NBC with MyNetworkTV on DT2)
- WCTI-TV 12 – New Bern (ABC with Fox on DT2)
- GPAT-TV – Greenville (Suddenlink Cable Channel 23 – Public-access television channel)
- GTV9 – Greenville's City Government-access television channel (Suddenlink Cable TV Channel 9)

=== Voice of America/IBB ===
Greenville was the largest transmitter site for the Voice of America shortwave broadcasts under the auspices of the U.S. government's International Broadcasting Bureau. Both transmitter buildings and three large antenna 'farms' were located just outside Greenville. The Greenville Transmitting Station provided shortwave broadcasts for U.S. government-funded, non-military, international broadcasting and served as a standby, alternate gateway for the Satellite Interconnect System to use to uplink programming, should the Washington, D.C., SIS gateway have become unavailable. The station was also a backup facility for uplinking programming to the Atlantic Ocean Region satellite and served as the primary return link of that satellite. For the VOA, the main target areas for the station's shortwave broadcasts were Latin America, the Caribbean with special emphasis on Cuba, and Africa. Three complexes, one for management, distribution, and monitoring, and the other two for actual transmitting, formed an approximately nineteen-mile (31 km) equilateral triangle around Greenville. At one time, these formed the largest international broadcasting site in the world. Two of the three sites have been decommissioned.

== Infrastructure ==
=== Health care ===
The health care community in Greenville is one of the largest in the state of North Carolina. With 861 beds, ECU Health Medical Center is the fifth largest hospital in North Carolina and is one of five academic medical centers in the state (others include the University of North Carolina at Chapel Hill, Duke University, Wake Forest University, and Campbell University). ECU Health Medical Center is the only trauma center east of Raleigh and serves as the teaching hospital for The Brody School of Medicine. The hospital hosts over 1,700 licensed medical providers and serves over 1.2 million residents of the region. Many medical offices and clinics along with the hospital and university teaching facilities lie on Greenville's west side, comprising what is known as the Medical District. The East Carolina Heart Institute has added 250 jobs at the hospital along with a six floor facility. A new 418,000 square foot Cancer Center broke ground at ECU Health Medical Center. The 96 inpatient room facility serves as one of the major destinations for oncology patients in Eastern North Carolina. The Golden LEAF Foundation announced a $10.8 million grant in 2018 and The Eddie and Jo Allison Smith Family Foundation also donated $10 million. Vidant Cancer Care at the Eddie and Jo Allison Smith Tower opened in March 2018.

=== Transportation ===
Major highways:

- I-587
- US 13 (Dickinson Avenue)
- US 258
- US 264
- NC 11 (Memorial Drive)
- NC 33
- NC 43 (5th Street, Charles Boulevard)
- NC 903

Rail freight transport is provided by CSX Transportation, along a north–south corridor, and Norfolk Southern Railway, along an east–west corridor.

Public transportation is provided by the G.K. Butterfield Transportation Center, which connects Uptown Greenville with local bus service, through the Greenville Area Transit (GREAT), and intercity bus service via Amtrak Thruway and Greyhound Lines. East Carolina University operates a local bus service, ECU Transit, and Pitt Area Transit (PATS) provides "by request" transportation.

Air service is available through the Pitt-Greenville Airport with scheduled flights daily to Charlotte Douglas International Airport via Piedmont Airlines and PSA Airlines.

Section of the South Tar River Greenway were completed in 2009, and 2011; a third section is planned.

As of 2022, the NCDOT Rail Division is studying the feasibility of Amtrak passenger rail transport between the city and Raleigh.

== Notable people ==
- Jamie Brewington, MLB pitcher
- Fred Brooks, computer scientist
- Andre Brown, former NFL running back with the New York Giants
- Brian Brown, politician
- Sandra Bullock, actor and producer (ECU graduate)
- Derek Cox, NFL cornerback
- Alge Crumpler, NFL tight end
- Carlester Crumpler, NFL tight end
- Daniel Dhers, BMX rider
- James Stephen "Jimmy" Donaldson (MrBeast), YouTuber, media personality, businessman, and philanthropist
- Bernard Edwards, Chic bass player and producer
- Brian Farkas, politician and representative for North Carolina's 9th House district
- William J. Hadden, church minister, city councilman
- Garth Risk Hallberg, novelist
- Wilber Hardee, founder of Hardee's
- Josh Harrington, BMX rider
- Whit Haydn, magician
- Al Hunter, NFL player
- James Johnson, former American Greco-Roman wrestler and coach
- Mike Laird, BMX rider
- Erica Lindbeck, voice actress
- Ma Haide (George Hatem), physician to Mao
- Rico Hines, college basketball player, Basketball Asst Coach
- Will MacKenzie, PGA Tour golfer
- Dave Mirra, BMX rider
- Greg Murphy, physician and politician
- Lee Norris, film and television actor
- Ryan Nyquist, BMX rider
- Mary H. Odom, North Carolina state legislator and politician
- Edward Cobb Outlaw, rear admiral in the U.S. Navy
- Petey Pablo, Rapper
- Bronswell Patrick, MLB player for the Milwaukee Brewers and San Francisco Giants
- Tommy Paul, professional tennis player
- Lauren Perdue, 2012 U.S. Olympic Gold Medalist in Women's Swimming
- Cornell Powell, NFL player
- Rodney Purvis, NBA Player
- Ricky Racks, hip-hop artist
- Day'Ron Sharpe, NBA player
- Caroline Shaw, Pulitzer-prize-winning composer
- Ashley Sheppard, NFL player
- Jessamine Shumate, artist, painter, cartographer
- Kandie Smith, politician and representative for North Carolina's 5th Senate district
- Susan G. Smith, medical researcher and Nobel nominee
- Tom Smith, musician, inductee into Jazz Education Hall of Fame
- Kentavius Street, NFL player
- Supastition, hip-hop artist
- Absalom Tatom, U.S. congressman for North Carolina's 4th congressional district (1795–1796)
- Billy Taylor, jazz musician, founder of Jazzmobile, CBS television personality
- Lawrence Tyson, World War I general and U.S. Senator
- James Harvey Ward, actor
- Joe West, MLB umpire
- Katharine Whalen, musician, singer, and songwriter
- Alex White, MLB pitcher
- Jermaine Williams, NFL football player

== See also ==
- List of municipalities in North Carolina
