= Oakmont (Greenville, North Carolina) =

Historic house in North Carolina, United States

- U.S. National Register of Historic Places
- Location within North Carolina Location within the United States
- Location: 2909 S. Memorial Dr., Greenville, North Carolina
- Coordinates: 35°34′59″N 77°23′45″W
- Area: 2.3 acres (0.93 ha)
- Built: 1930
- Architect: Benton and Benton
- Architectural style: Colonial Revival
- NRHP reference No.: 01001115
- Added to NRHP: October 15, 2001

Oakmont, also known as the William Albion Dunn House, is a historic home located at Greenville, Pitt County, North Carolina. It was designed by the architectural firm Benton & Benton and built in 1930. It is a two-story, five bay Colonial Revival frame dwelling with projecting frame wings, a screened porch and porte cochere and an open porch and rear sun room. Also on the property are the contributing garage (c. 1931), playhouse (c. 1931), and house site.

It was added to the National Register of Historic Places in 2001.
