= College View Historic District =

Historic district in North Carolina, United States

- U.S. National Register of Historic Places
- U.S. Historic district
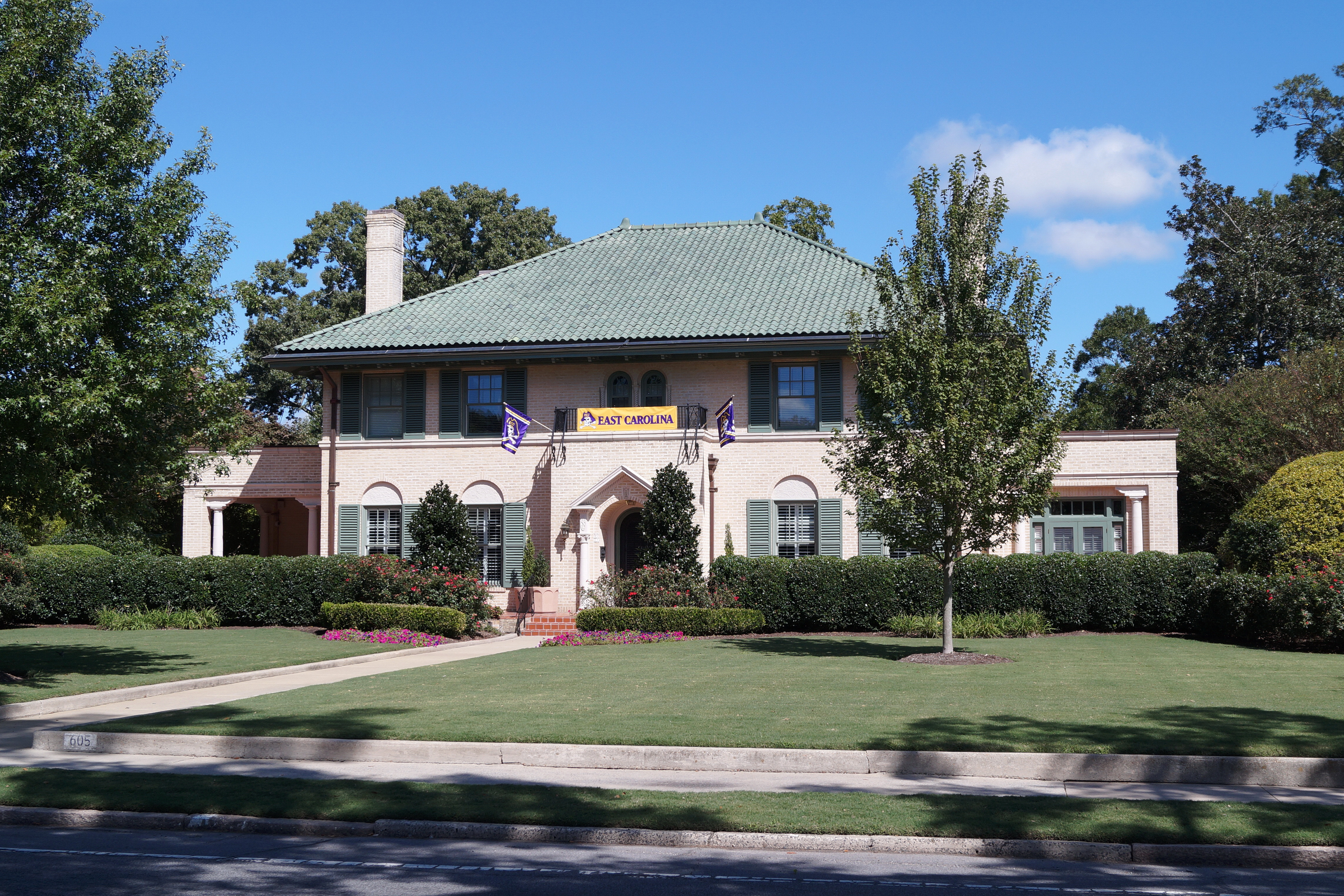
- Chancellor's Residence, College View Historic District, September 2014

- Location within North Carolina Location within the United States
- Location: Roughly bounded by Holly, Eastern, E. First and E. Fifth Sts., Greenville, North Carolina
- Coordinates: 35°36′37″N 77°21′54″W
- Area: 57 acres (23 ha)
- Built: 1925–1949, 1900–1924
- Architect: Multiple
- Architectural style: Bungalow/Craftsman, Colonial Revival, Tudor Revival
- NRHP reference No.: 92000181
- Added to NRHP: March 19, 1992

The College View Historic District is a national historic district located north of East Carolina University at Greenville, Pitt County, North Carolina. The district encompasses 343 contributing buildings in a predominantly residential section of Greenville. It includes buildings dated from about 1909 to World War II and notable examples of Bungalow / American Craftsman, Colonial Revival, and Tudor Revival architecture. Notable buildings include St. Paul's Episcopal Church (1930), the Rotary Club Building (1921), Chancellor's Residence (former William H. Dail Jr. House, 1921–1930), William Harrington House, Bateman House (1910), Franklin Vines Johnston House (1923), and Dr. Paul Fitzgerald House (1929).

In March 1992, College View was listed on the National Register of Historic Places.

== See also ==
- List of Registered Historic Places in North Carolina
