= Jesse R. Moye House =

Historic house in North Carolina, United States

- U.S. National Register of Historic Places
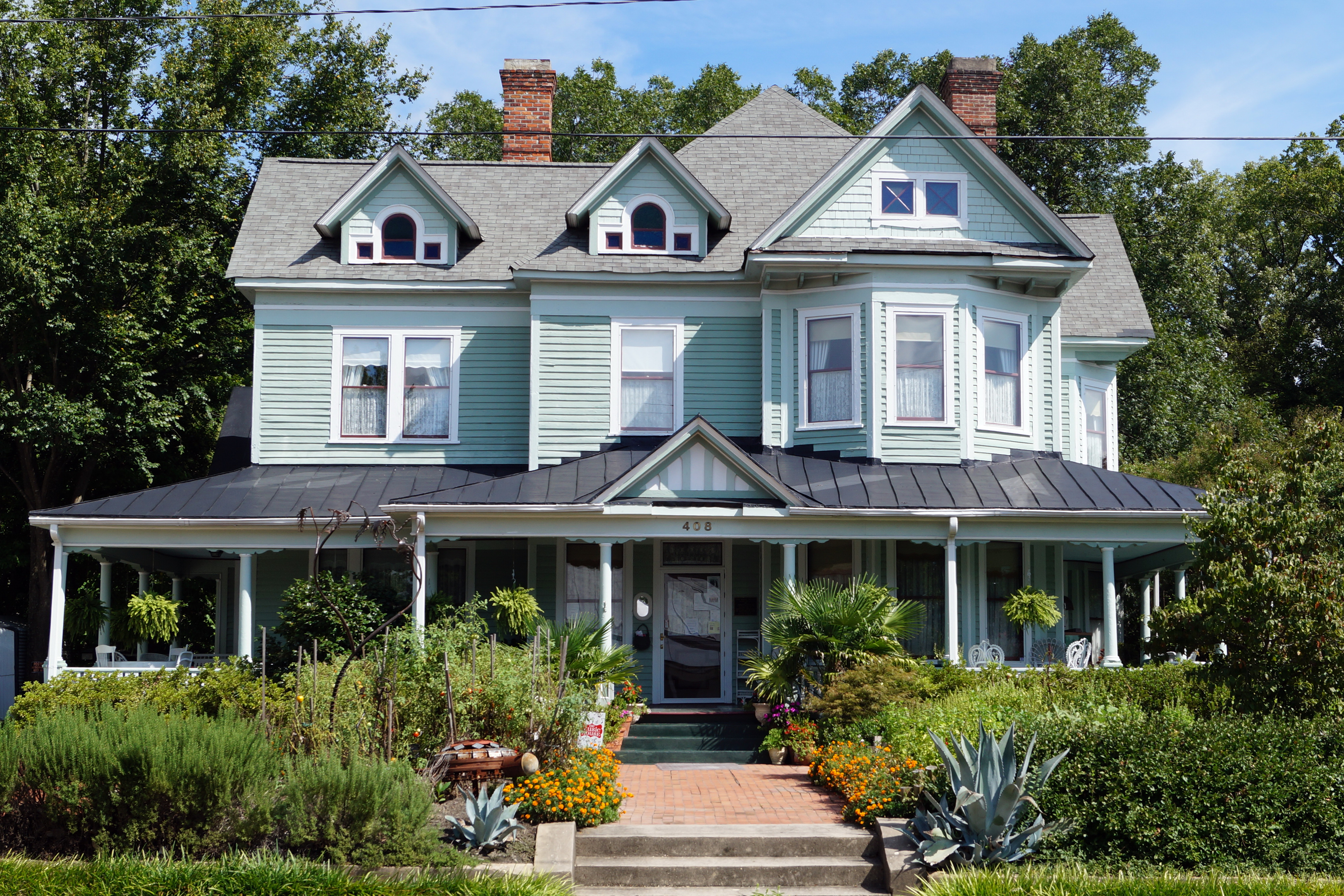
- Jesse R. Moye House, September 2014

- Location within North Carolina Location within the United States
- Location: 408 W. Fifth St., Greenville, North Carolina
- Coordinates: 35°36′43″N 77°22′38″W
- Area: less than one acre
- Built: 1902
- Architect: Simpson, Herbert Woodley
- Architectural style: Queen Anne, Colonial Revival
- NRHP reference No.: 97001220
- Added to NRHP: October 17, 1997

Jesse R. Moye House is a historic home located at Greenville, Pitt County, North Carolina. It was designed by architect Herbert Woodley Simpson and built in 1902. It is a 2 1/2-story, Queen Anne style frame dwelling with Colonial Revival style details. It has a large wraparound front porch, multiple projections, and multiple gable roofline.

It was added to the National Register of Historic Places in 1997.
