= Canton Historic District =

Canton Historic District may refer to:

- Canton Center Historic District, Canton, Connecticut, NRHP-listed
- Canton Historic District (Canton, Georgia), NRHP-listed in Cherokee County
- Canton Commercial Historic District, Canton, Georgia
- Canton Historic District (Baltimore, Maryland), NRHP-listed and part of the Canton, Baltimore neighborhood
- Canton Corner Historic District, Canton, Massachusetts, NRHP-listed
- Canton Courthouse Square Historic District, Canton, Mississippi, NRHP-listed in Madison County
- East Canton Historic District, Canton, Mississippi, NRHP-listed in Madison County
- Canton Main Street Historic District, Canton, North Carolina, NRHP-listed
- Upper Downtown Canton Historic District, Canton, Ohio, NRHP-listed in Stark County
