= National Register of Historic Places listings in Cherokee County, Georgia =

Location of Cherokee County in Georgia

This is a list of properties and districts in Cherokee County, Georgia that are listed on the National Register of Historic Places (NRHP).

This National Park Service list is complete through NPS recent listings posted July 31, 2026.

== Current listings ==
	Name on the Register	Image	Date listed	Location	City or town	Description
1	Ball Ground Historic District	Ball Ground Historic District	December 4, 2009 (#09001057)	Old Canton Rd. and GA 372; 34°20′21″N 84°22′41″W	Ball Ground	
2	Canton Commercial Historic District	Canton Commercial Historic District	January 12, 1984 (#84000962)	Roughly bounded by Main, Church, Archer, and Marietta Sts. 34°14′12″N 84°29′27″W	Canton	
3	Canton Historic District	Canton Historic District	September 23, 2010 (#10000803)	Roughly centered on Main St. between the Etowah River on the west and Jeannette St. on the east 34°14′11″N 84°29′25″W	Canton	
4	Canton Cotton Mills No. 2	Canton Cotton Mills No. 2	April 1, 2002 (#02000293)	200 Ball Ground Hwy. 34°14′40″N 84°29′10″W	Canton	Converted to loft apartments
5	Canton Wholesale Company Building	Canton Wholesale Company Building	November 13, 1997 (#97001421)	15 Main St. 34°14′13″N 84°29′43″W	Canton	
6	Cherokee County Courthouse	Cherokee County Courthouse	May 28, 1981 (#81000198)	100 North St. 34°14′15″N 84°29′29″W	Canton	
7	Crescent Farm	Crescent Farm	November 27, 1989 (#89002032)	GA 5, SE of GA 140; 34°14′16″N 84°30′00″W	Canton	
8	R. M. Moore Elementary School		August 3, 2026 (#100012712)	471 Grady Street; 34°19′00″N 84°32′59″W	Waleska	
9	Alfred W. Roberts House	Alfred W. Roberts House	September 11, 1985 (#85002313)	GA 372; 34°20′25″N 84°22′45″W	Ball Ground	
10	Woodstock Depot	Woodstock Depot	June 20, 1995 (#95000736)	2 N. Main St. (GA 5); 34°06′02″N 84°31′09″W	Woodstock	
