= Benton & Benton =

Benton & Benton was an architectural partnership in eastern North Carolina of brothers Charles C. Benton Sr. and Frank W. Benton. Several of its works are listed on the U.S. National Register of Historic Places. Charles C. Benton Jr. and others also worked for the firm.

Works include:

- Bowers–Tripp House, 1040 N. Market St., Washington, NC (Benton & Benton), NRHP-listed
- Canton Main Street Historic District, Bounded roughly by Park St., Main St., Bridge St., and Adams St., Canton, NC (Benton & Benton), NRHP-listed
- Cherry Hotel, 333 E. Nash St. Wilson NC (Benton, Charles Collins), NRHP-listed
- Colonial Theater, 55-57 Park St., Canton, NC (Benton & Benton), NRHP-listed
- First Colony Inn, 6720 S. Virginia Dare Trail, Nags Head, NC (Benton, Frank), NRHP-listed
- Greenville Municipal Building (1929) in the Greenville Commercial Historic District.
- Halifax County Home and Tubercular Hospital, NC 903, Halifax, NC (Benton & Benton), NRHP-listed
- Lenoir High School, 100 Willow St., Lenoir, NC (Benton & Benton), NRHP-listed
- M & O Chevrolet Company, 412 W. Russell St., Fayetteville, NC (Benton, Frank), NRHP-listed
- Walter McCanless House, 200 Confederate Ave., Salisbury, NC (Benton and Benton of Wilson NC), NRHP-listed
- Montgomery County Courthouse, E. Main St. between S. Main and S. Pearl Sts., Troy, NC (Benton & Benton), NRHP-listed
- North Carolina School for the Deaf Historic District, Jct. US 70 and US 64, Morganton, NC (Benton, Charles C.), NRHP-listed
- Oakmont, 2909 S. Memorial Dr., Greenville, NC (Benton and Benton), NRHP-listed
- Washington County Courthouse, Main and Adams Sts., Plymouth, NC (Benton & Benton), NRHP-listed
- One or more works in Downtown Main Street Historic District, roughly the 800 and 900 Blks of Main St., North Wilkesboro, NC (Benton and Benton), NRHP-listed
- One or more works in Farmville Historic District, roughly bounded by Turnage, Pine, Jones, and Waverly Sts., Farmville, NC (Benton & Benton), NRHP-listed
- One or more works in Ayden Historic District, roughly bounded by Verna St., Peachtree St., E. College St. and Planters St., Ayden, NC (Benton & Benton Associates), NRHP-listed
- One or more works in Queen–Gordon Streets Historic District, roughly N. Queen and Gordon Sts., Kinston, NC (Benton & Benton), NRHP-listed
- One or more works in Williamston Commercial Historic District, roughly, areas surrounding the 100 blocks of E. Main, W. Main and S. Smithwick Sts. and the 200 block of Washington St., Williamston, NC (Benton, Charles Collins), NRHP-listed
- One or more works in Williamston Historic District, roughly bounded by Franklin, Harrell, Williams, South Haughton, North Railroad, Roberson, and White Sts., Williamston, NC (Benton, Charles C.; Benton, Frank W.), NRHP-listed
