= Canton Theatre =

Theatre in Canton, Georgia, US

Coordinates: 34.2366°N 84.4902°W

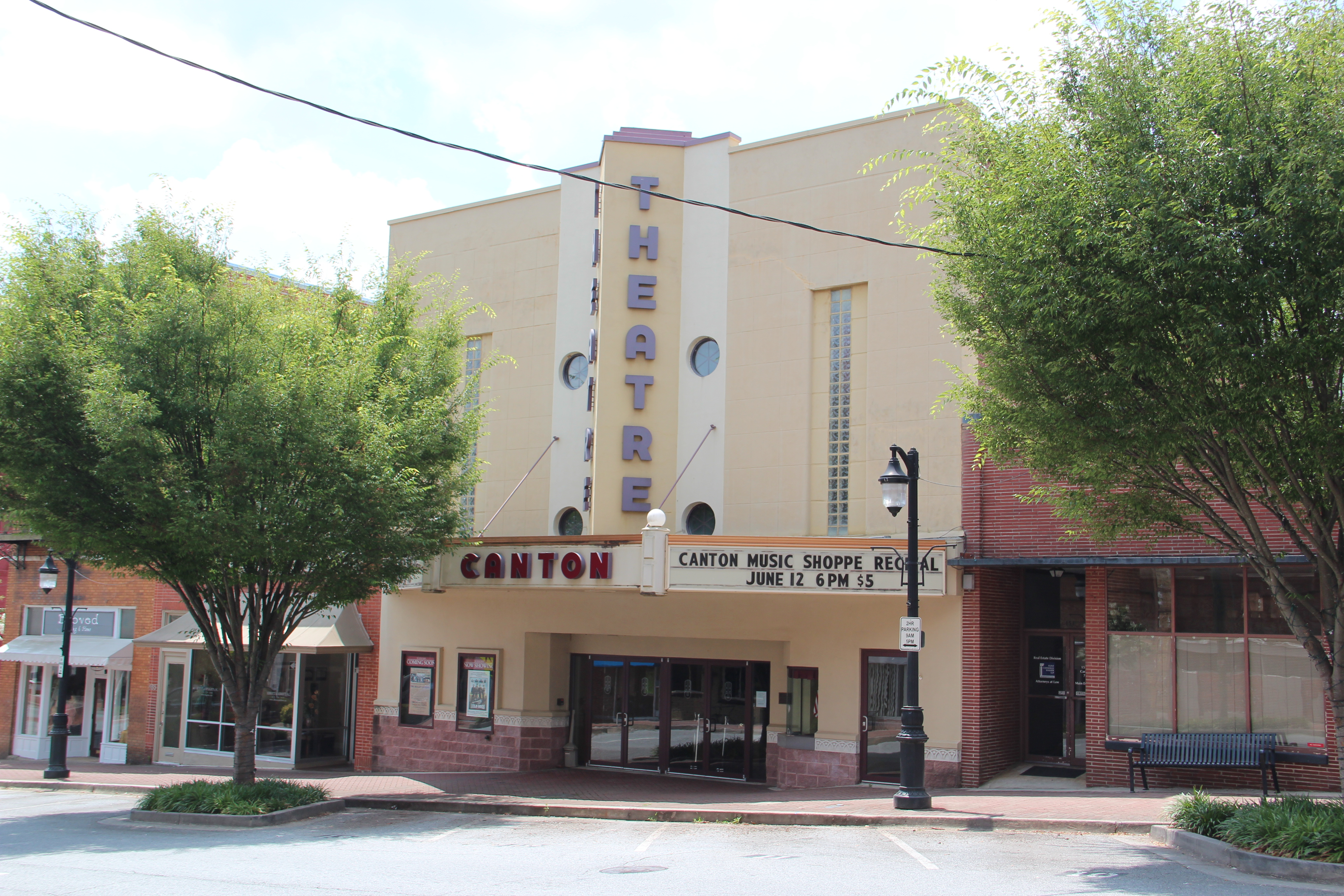
Canton Theatre in downtown Canton

The Canton Theatre is a historic theatre located in the downtown area of Canton, Georgia, and has been in existence since early 1911. During that time the theatre has experienced many changes with redevelopments, expansions and even restoration after it had fallen into disrepair. The theatre provides patrons with theatrical and musical productions since its change into a non-profit theatre in 2003.

== Original theatre ==
The theatre was originally used to show slides and silent movies when it first opened in 1911. In the early 1920s new owners changed the name to Bonita and began movie showings on Fridays and Saturdays. During this period the Bonita grew in popularity which led to renovation and expansion. The theatre eventually changed its name again to Haven put on top shows including their first talking motion picture 'Singing Fool' starring Al Jolson. In the late 1930s the theatre changed ownership again and had its name changed to Canton Theatre It underwent a major redevelopment in which new safety technologies of the day were included and modelled to reproduce the Art Deco design popular at the time. The Canton Theatre reopened in September 1940.

== Close and restoration ==
The theatre went into dramatic decline having continued to show movies since the renovation back in the late 1930s. The theatre was out of date and could not compete with the convenience and choice offered by the drive-ins and eventually closed during the 1970s. The theatre fell into serious disrepair following its closure before finally, in 1994, an individual bought the theatre for restoration. The City of Canton then acquired the property in 1997. In order to secure financing for restoration the City of Canton later deeded it to the Downtown Development Authority.

== Charitable change ==
Today, the theatre stages Broadway productions on a large scale, bringing actors and patrons from all over the Metro Atlanta area together. In 2003, under the banner, of the Canton Preservation Inc the theatre became a section 501(c)(3) non-profit theatre enabling donations to be fully tax deductible.
