= Halifax County Home and Tubercular Hospital =

Historic district in North Carolina, United States

- U.S. National Register of Historic Places
- U.S. Historic district
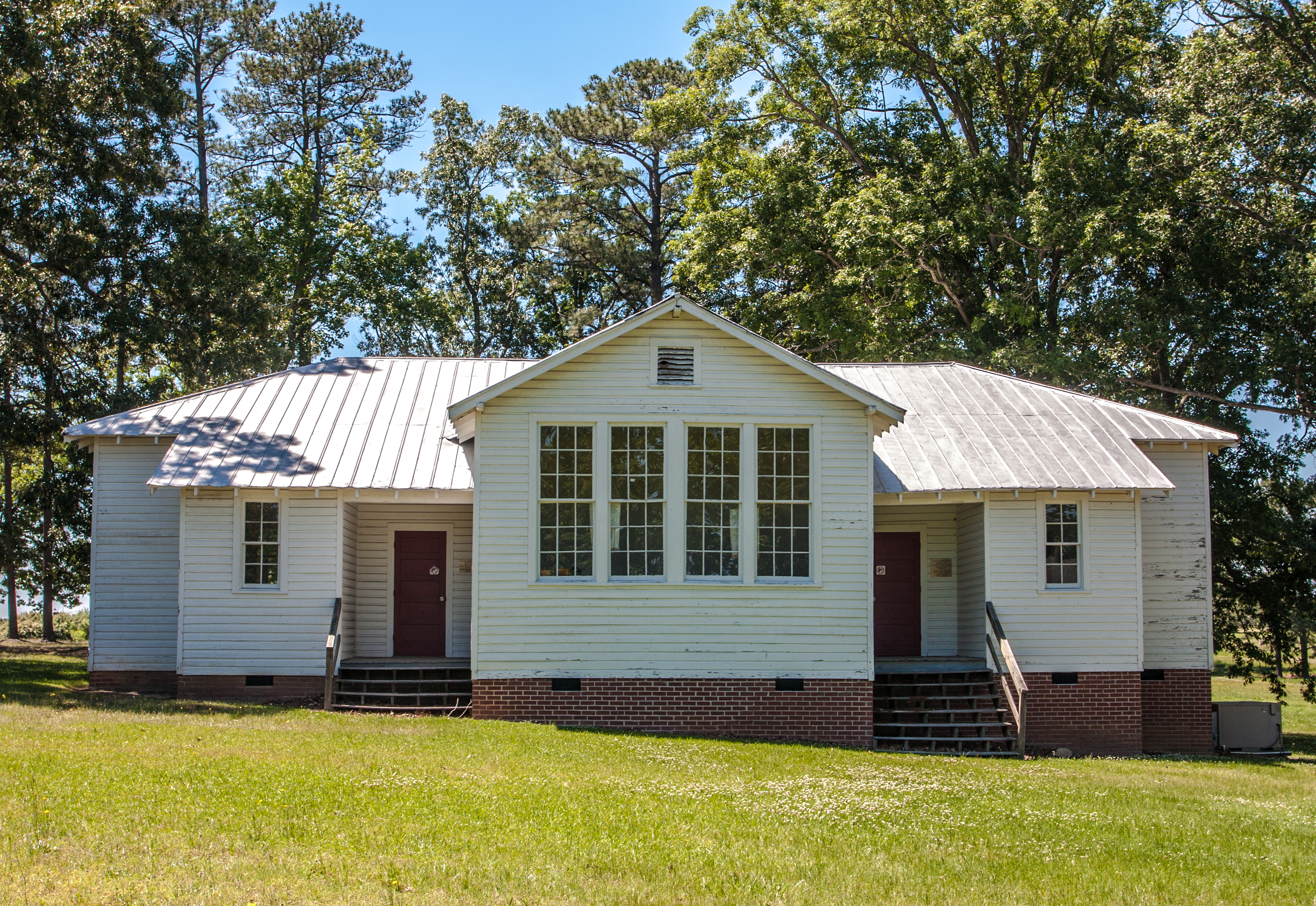

- Location within North Carolina Location within the United States
- Location: NC 903, Halifax, North Carolina
- Coordinates: 36°21′12″N 77°37′17″W
- Area: 350 acres (140 ha)
- Built: 1923
- Built by: Flanigan, E.G.
- Architect: Benton & Benton
- Architectural style: Classical
- NRHP reference No.: 85003338
- Added to NRHP: December 10, 1985

The Halifax County Home and Tubercular Hospital is a historic hospital complex and national historic district located near Halifax, Halifax County, North Carolina. The listing included nine contributing buildings, two contributing sites and one contributing structure including the site of the first (ca. 1845) Halifax County home and cemetery, the 1923 county home, and its neighbor, the county tubercular hospital, completed in 1925. Other contributing resources are domestic and agricultural outbuildings. The county home was designed by architects Benton & Benton and is a Neoclassical brick building composed of a two-story central pavilion with one-story hyphenated wings. The tubercular hospital is a one-story brick building with a gable roof. The hospital closed in 1973. The tubercular hospital has been destroyed.

It was listed on the National Register of Historic Places in 1985.
