= Canton, North Carolina =

- Town
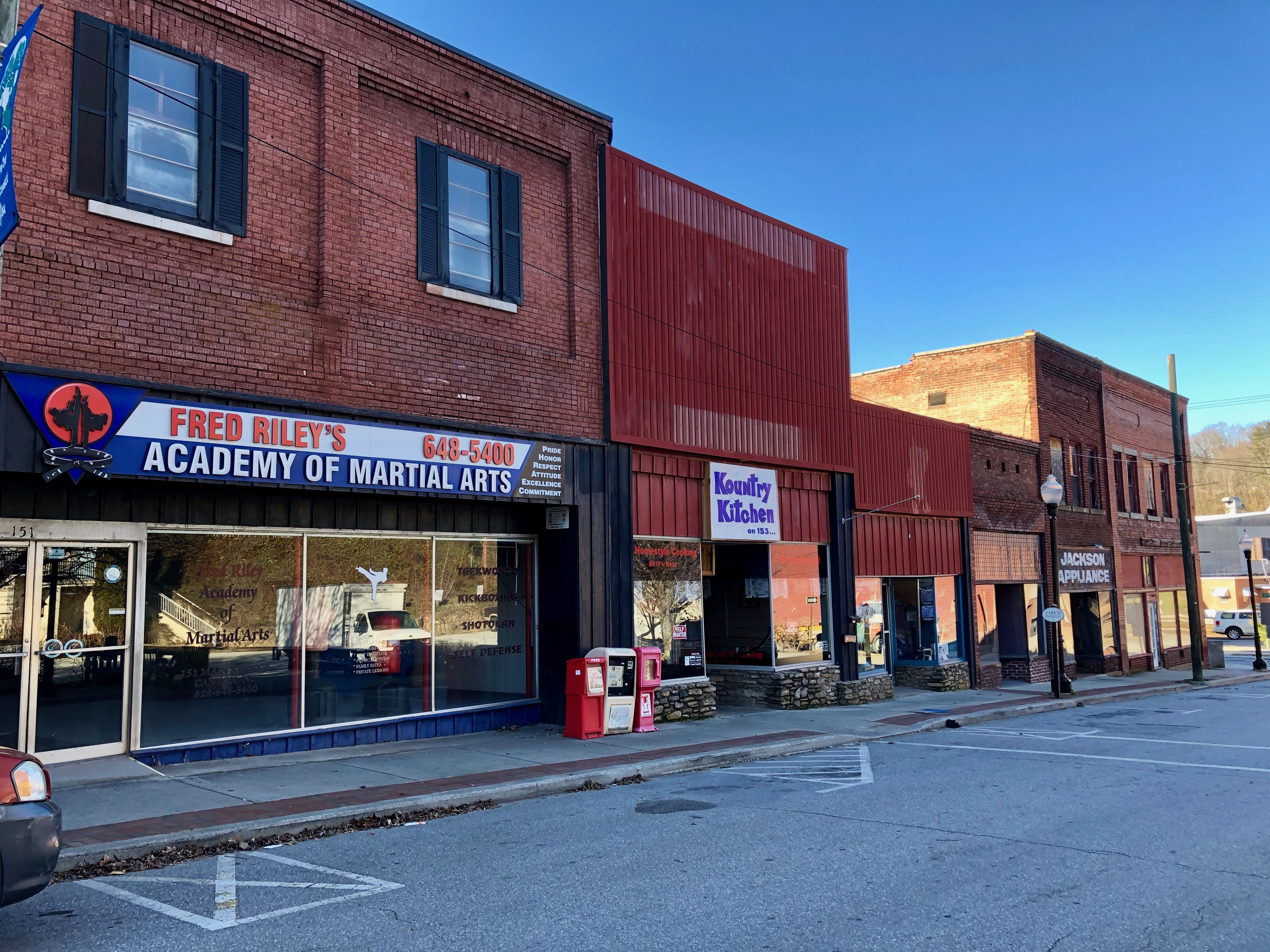
- Main Street

- Flag Seal
- Motto: "Where the mountains kiss the sky"
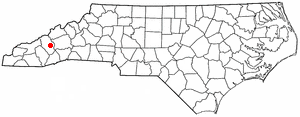
- Location of Canton, North Carolina
- Coordinates: 35°32′11″N 82°50′19″W
- Country: United States
- State: North Carolina
- County: Haywood

Area
  - Total: 3.72 sq mi (9.63 km^{2})
  - Land: 3.72 sq mi (9.63 km^{2})
  - Water: 0 sq mi (0.00 km^{2})
- Elevation: 2,631 ft (802 m)

Population (2020)
  - Total: 4,422
  - Density: 1,189.0/sq mi (459.06/km^{2})
- Time zone: UTC-5 (Eastern (EST))
  - Summer (DST): UTC-4 (EDT)
- ZIP code: 28716
- Area code: 828
- FIPS code: 37-10240
- GNIS feature ID: 2405375
- Website: www.cantonnc.com

Canton is the second largest town in Haywood County, North Carolina, United States. It is located about 17 miles (27 km) west of Asheville and is part of that city's metropolitan area. The town is named after the city of Canton, Ohio. The population was 4,422 at the 2020 census.

== History ==
This area was long settled by succeeding Indigenous cultures. What is known as the archeological Garden Creek site, listed on the National Register of Historic Places, is located on the south side of the Pigeon River, approximately seven miles west of Canton. It was inhabited from 8000 BCE by successive cultures of Indigenous peoples. Villages were developed in the Middle Woodland (200-600 CE) and The Southeast Appalachian Mississippian culture (1000 to 1450/1500 CE) periods. The Cherokee people are the most recent Native Americans to occupy this area, which is part of their homelands in the western Carolinas, southeastern Tennessee, and northeastern Georgia. The Cherokee in Western North Carolina are known as the Eastern Band of Cherokee Indians, a federally recognized tribe.

The prehistoric peoples built a total of four earthwork mounds at the site. Three have been excavated, the last two platform mounds in the 1960s prior to residential development.

European Americans did not begin to settle here until the late 1780s, following the American Revolutionary War, United States independence, and gaining cessions of land to the US by the Cherokee. By 1790, Jonathan McPeters was farming the banks of the Pigeon River at the site where Canton developed. Around 1815 the first church was built in what was to become Canton; it was called the Locust Old Field Baptist Church. "Old Field" often referred to areas cultivated or occupied by the Cherokee people, as this was known to be part of their traditional homelands.

Canton was founded in 1889 as "Buford". Later that same year, the name was changed to "Vinson". The name was changed to "Pigeon Ford" in 1891, and to "Canton" in 1893. The town was named for Canton, Ohio, the source of the steel for the bridge that was built across the Pigeon River.

Canton's river location enabled the development of industry that used water power.

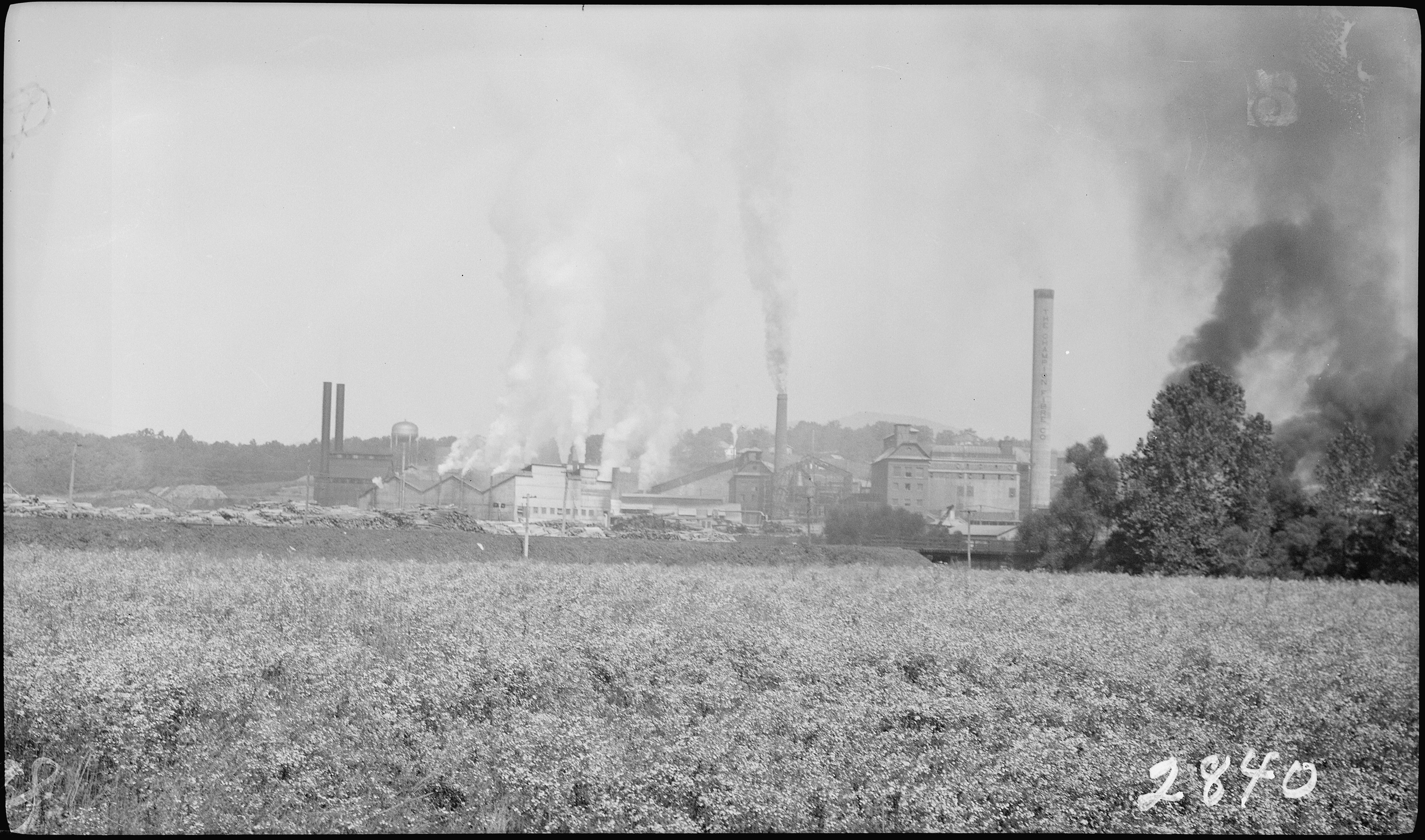
Champion factory in 1937

Peter G. Thomson had built Champion Coated Paper Company of Hamilton, Ohio into one of largest manufacturers of paper in the United States. He visited Western North Carolina in 1905 looking for a location for a pulp mill to supply his company. The area had large forests that would supply timber. Leaders of communities farther to the west tried to convince Thomson to choose their areas. While the timber supplies were greater to the west, Thomson wanted areas with more spruce and settled on Canton, which had the type trees Thomson wanted, enough land for a mill, and the Pigeon River to move logs to the mill (Thomson later realized the river did not decline sufficiently, so railroads were used to move logs instead). Construction on the mill began in 1906. Many of the workers also had farms that they had to return to, so immigrants were hired to do much of the work.

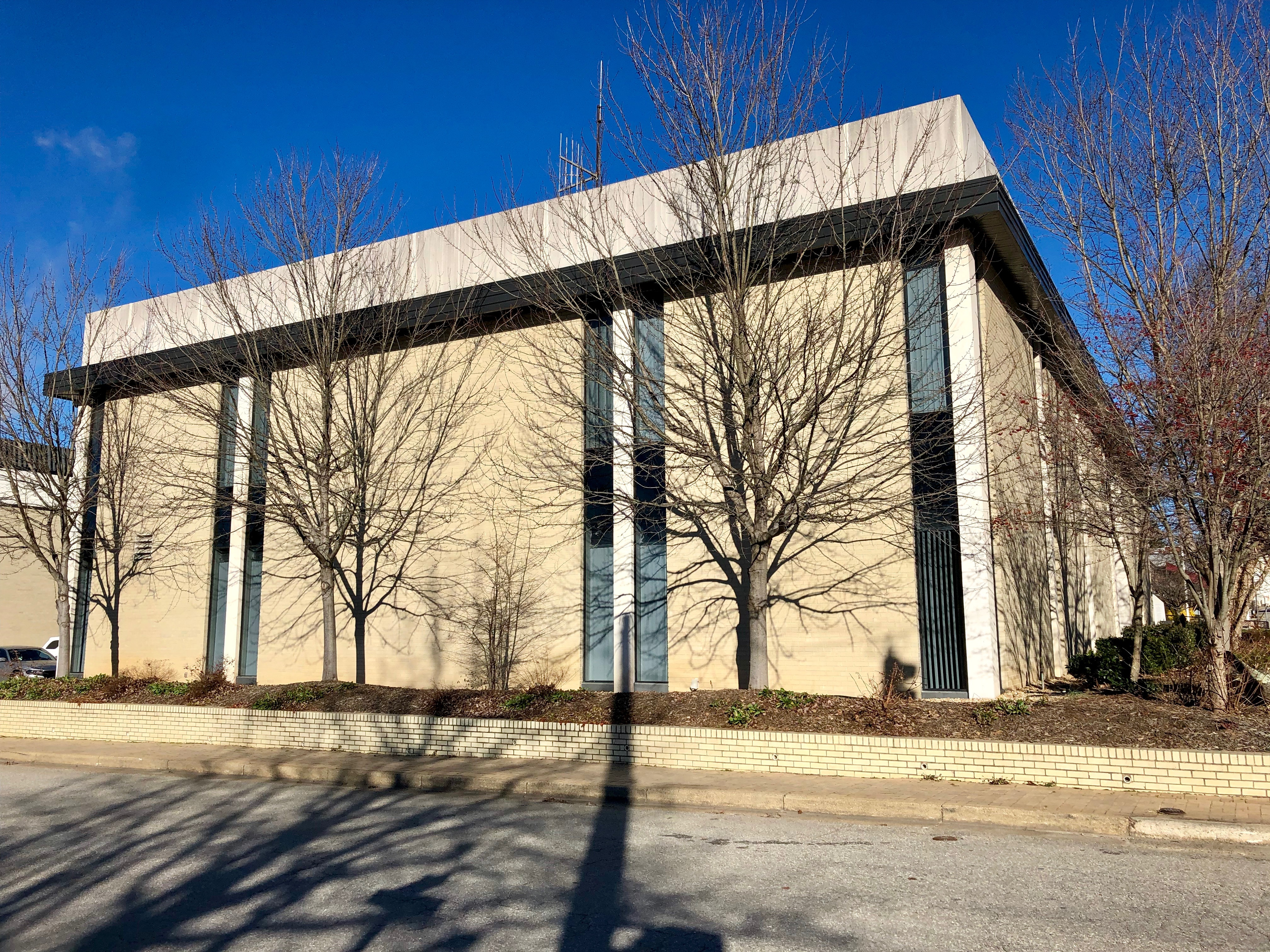
Town hall

Canton had 350 people when work began. When the Champion Fibre Company mill opened in 1908, it had about 1000 employees and resulted in other related jobs being created, including construction of neighborhoods such as Fibreville, with 60 homes for employees. Thomson had great respect for the workers, believing those who had wealth should provide jobs for those who needed them, and began an annual Labor Day celebration in 1906, which continued a hundred years later.

When Champion owners decided to close the plant in 1997 because of environmental issues, the employees purchased the plant and formed Blue Ridge Paper Company. Under an ESOP, the employees owned a 45% stake in the new company. The plant was sold to Evergreen Packaging, which in 2020 became Pactiv Evergreen. The Blue Ridge Southern Railroad served the plant and has a small railyard next to it. On March 6, 2023, Pactiv Evergreen announced the mill would close in the summer, affecting 1,100 workers. The documentary Papertown by New Union Studios, telling the story of the mill's closing, premiered in Canton in May 2026 and at the Mountainfilm Festival in Telluride, Colorado.

The Canton Main Street Historic District and Colonial Theater are listed on the National Register of Historic Places.

On August 17, 2021, Tropical Storm Fred flooded the town near the Pigeon River. As of June 2022, many buildings surrounding the river were still not usable as a result of the storm. In nearby Cruso, six people died as a result from the flooding, many of which at Laurel Bank Campground. Flooding from Hurricane Helene in September 2024 was even worse.

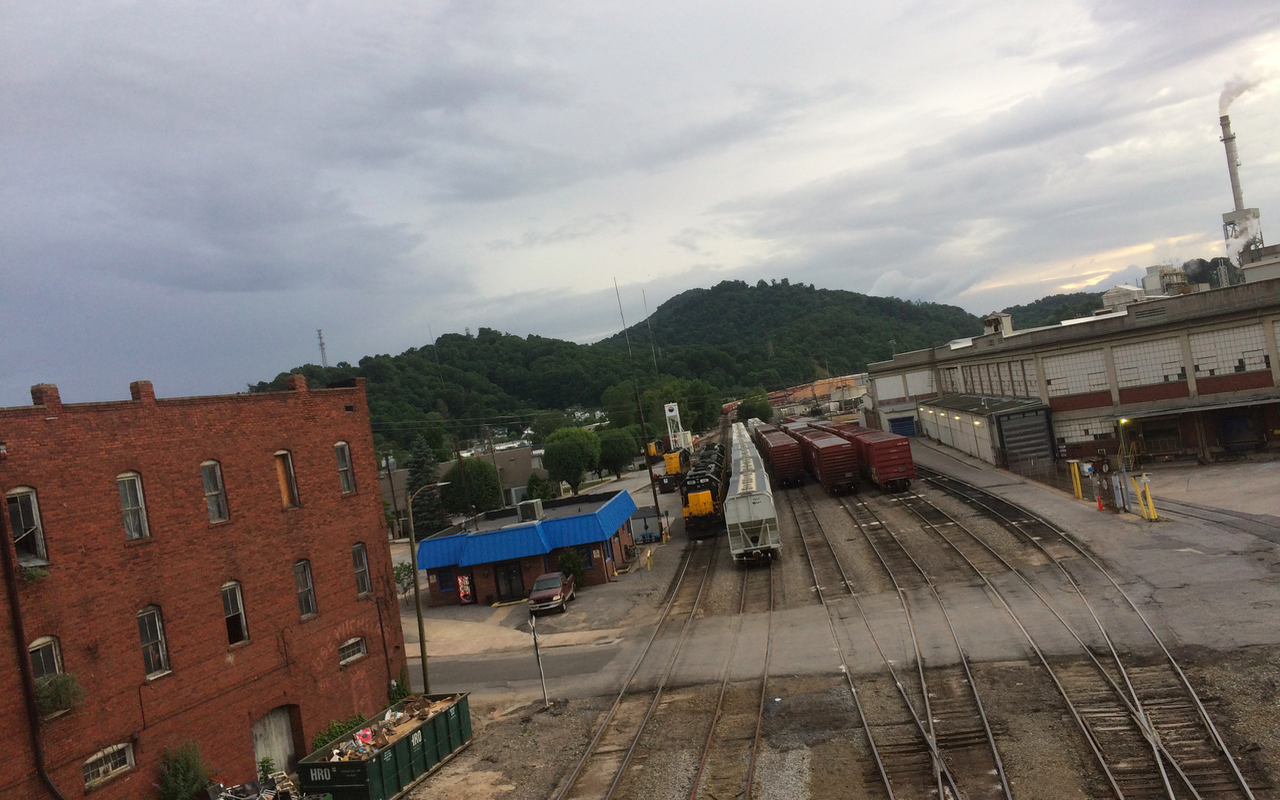
View of Canton

== Geography ==
Canton is in east-central Haywood County, on both sides of the Pigeon River. U.S. Routes 19 and 23 pass through the center of town as Park Street and Main Street. The highways lead east 17 miles (27 km) to Asheville and west 7 miles (11 km) to Lake Junaluska. Interstate 40 passes through the northernmost part of Canton, with access from Exits 31 and 33. I-40 leads east to Asheville and northwest through the Pigeon River Gorge into Tennessee.

According to the U.S. Census Bureau, the town of Canton has a total area of 3.8 square miles (9.8 km^{2}), all land.

== Demographics ==
Historical population
Census	Pop.	Note	%±
1900	230		—
1910	1,393		505.7%
1920	2,584		85.5%
1930	5,117		98.0%
1940	5,037		−1.6%
1950	4,906		−2.6%
1960	5,068		3.3%
1970	5,158		1.8%
1980	4,631		−10.2%
1990	3,790		−18.2%
2000	4,029		6.3%
2010	4,227		4.9%
2020	4,422		4.6%
U.S. Decennial Census

=== 2020 census ===
As of the 2020 census, Canton had a population of 4,422. The median age was 40.8 years. 19.8% of residents were under the age of 18 and 19.1% of residents were 65 years of age or older. For every 100 females there were 87.6 males, and for every 100 females age 18 and over there were 85.5 males age 18 and over.

99.4% of residents lived in urban areas, while 0.6% lived in rural areas.

There were 1,928 households in Canton, of which 26.7% had children under the age of 18 living in them. Of all households, 38.8% were married-couple households, 19.0% were households with a male householder and no spouse or partner present, and 34.3% were households with a female householder and no spouse or partner present. About 34.9% of all households were made up of individuals and 16.1% had someone living alone who was 65 years of age or older.

There were 2,086 housing units, of which 7.6% were vacant. The homeowner vacancy rate was 1.7% and the rental vacancy rate was 2.5%.

Canton racial composition
Race	Number	Percentage
White (non-Hispanic)	3,872	87.56%
Black or African American (non-Hispanic)	90	2.04%
Native American	25	0.57%
Asian	12	0.27%
Other/Mixed	168	3.8%
Hispanic or Latino	255	5.77%

=== 2000 census ===
As of the census of 2000, there were 4,029 people, 1,819 households, and 1,118 families residing in the town. The population density was 1,054.6 people per square mile (407.2 people/km^{2}). There were 2,003 housing units at an average density of 524.3 per square mile (202.4/km^{2}). The racial makeup of the town was 96.13% White, 1.59% African American, 0.57% Native American, 0.10% Asian, 0.94% from other races, and 0.67% from two or more races. Hispanic or Latino of any race were 2.41% of the population.

There were 1,819 households, out of which 22.7% had children under the age of 18 living with them, 47.7% were married couples living together, 10.5% had a female householder with no husband present, and 38.5% were non-families. 35.4% of all households were made up of individuals, and 20.3% had someone living alone who was 65 years of age or older. The average household size was 2.17 and the average family size was 2.78.

In the town, the population was spread out, with 19.6% under the age of 18, 6.9% from 18 to 24, 26.0% from 25 to 44, 24.1% from 45 to 64, and 23.5% who were 65 years of age or older. The median age was 43 years. For every 100 females, there were 85.9 males. For every 100 females age 18 and over, there were 81.7 males.

The median income for a household in the town was $28,775, and the median income for a family was $38,191. Males had a median income of $28,792 versus $22,143 for females. The per capita income for the town was $17,995. About 9.5% of families and 13.3% of the population were below the poverty line, including 24.6% of those under age 18 and 5.9% of those age 65 or over.

== Schools ==
- Pisgah High School
- Canton Middle School
- North Canton Elementary
- Bethel Middle School
- Bethel Elementary School
- Meadowbrook Elementary
- Bethel Christian Academy
