= Crescent Farm =

Historic farm near Canton, Georgia

- U.S. National Register of Historic Places
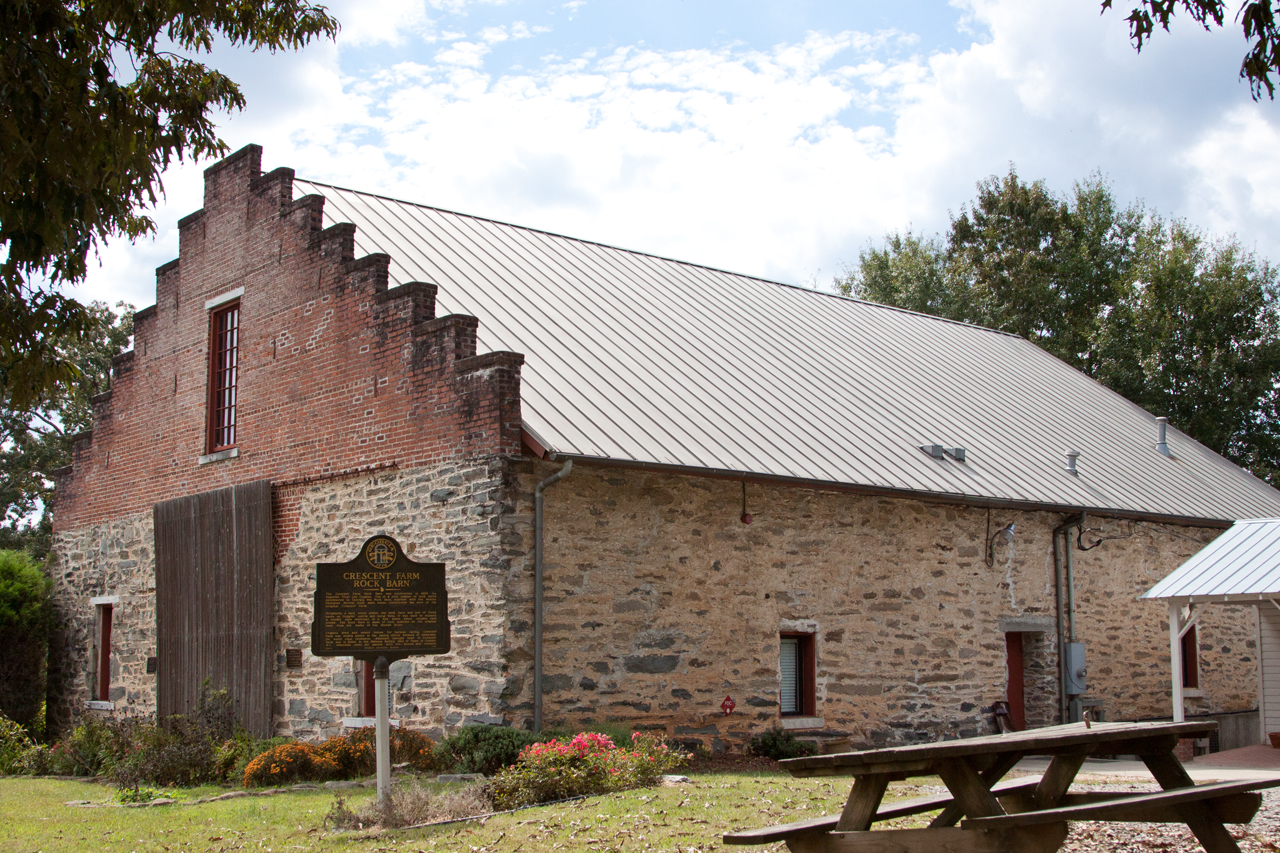

- Location within Georgia
- Location: GA 5, SE of GA 140, Canton, Georgia
- Coordinates: 34.23785°N 84.50°W
- Area: 4 acres (1.6 ha)
- Built: 1906
- Architect: Francis P. Smith
- Architectural style: Colonial Revival
- NRHP reference No.: 89002032
- Added to NRHP: November 27, 1989

The Crescent Farm, near Canton, Georgia on Georgia State Route 5 southeast of Georgia State Route 140, is a historic property that was listed on the National Register of Historic Places in 1989. The listing includes two contributing buildings (the house and the barn/stable) and a non-contributing structure, on 4 acres (1.6 ha).

== Description ==
The farm's two-story Georgian Revival house, built in 1922 and known as Edgewater Hall or A.L. Coggins House, is situated on Mt. Etowah and overlooks the Etowah River, which forms a crescent shape around the original 350 acres (1.4 km^{2}) property. The house was designed by Atlanta architect Francis P. Smith (1886–1971). The house was renovated considerably in 1986 when it was converted for use by the Cherokee Federal Savings Bank.

Separated from the house by Georgia State Route 5 is the associated rock and brick barn, built in 1906 as a stable for race horses. The barn was built after a fire destroyed its wooden predecessor, killing valuable race horses. The barn was built from rock quarried by the Etowah River, and with bricks in its gable level; it has a stepped gable at the front. The property also had a one-mile track used for harness racing. Crescent Farm was known for its racehorses raised by A.L. Coggins. Abbedale (1917–1950) was the farm's most famous racehorse, and went on to sire six pacers with two-minute mile records.
