= Downtown Main Street Historic District (North Wilkesboro, North Carolina) =

Historic district in North Carolina, United States

- U.S. National Register of Historic Places
- U.S. Historic district
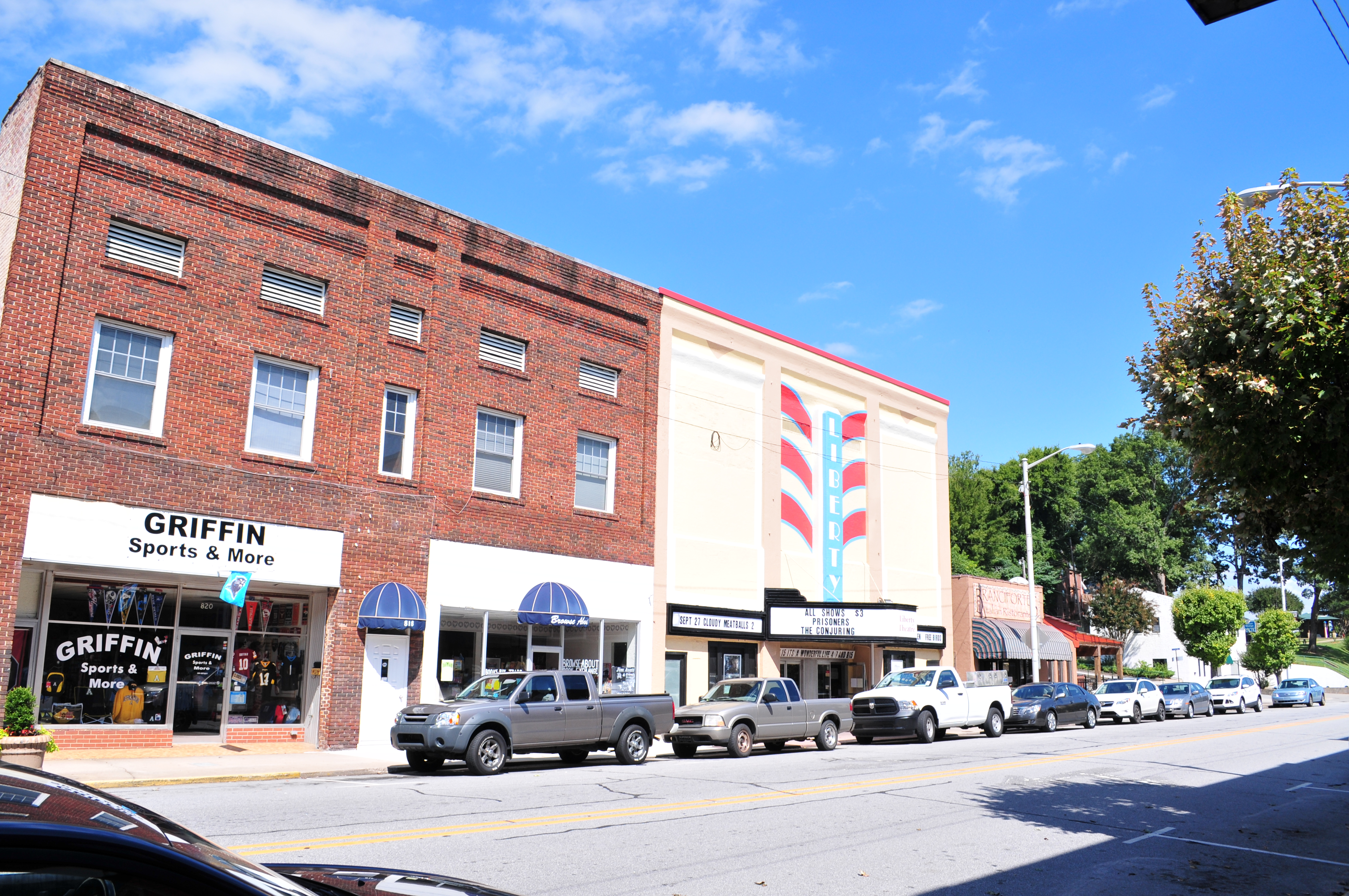

- Location within North Carolina Location within the United States
- Location: Roughly the 800 and 900 Blocks of Main St., North Wilkesboro, North Carolina
- Coordinates: 36°9′34″N 81°8′47″W
- Area: 3 acres (1.2 ha)
- Built: 1891
- Architect: Benton & Benton
- Architectural style: Early Commercial, Classical Revival, et al.
- NRHP reference No.: 03000392
- Added to NRHP: May 9, 2003

The Downtown Main Street Historic District is a national historic district located at North Wilkesboro, Wilkes County, North Carolina. It encompasses 29 contributing buildings in the central business district of North Wilkesboro. It developed between about 1891 and 1952, and includes notable examples of Classical Revival and Early Commercial style architecture. The architectural firm Benton & Benton designed the former Bank of North Wilkesboro II (1923), the Hotel Wilkes (1926), and the former Town Hall (1939). Other notable buildings include the Liberty Theater (c. 1946), former Bank of North Wilkesboro (1892), and Tomlinson Department Store (1927).

It was listed on the National Register of Historic Places in 2003.
