= Ball Ground, Georgia =

City in Cherokee County, Georgia, United States

- City
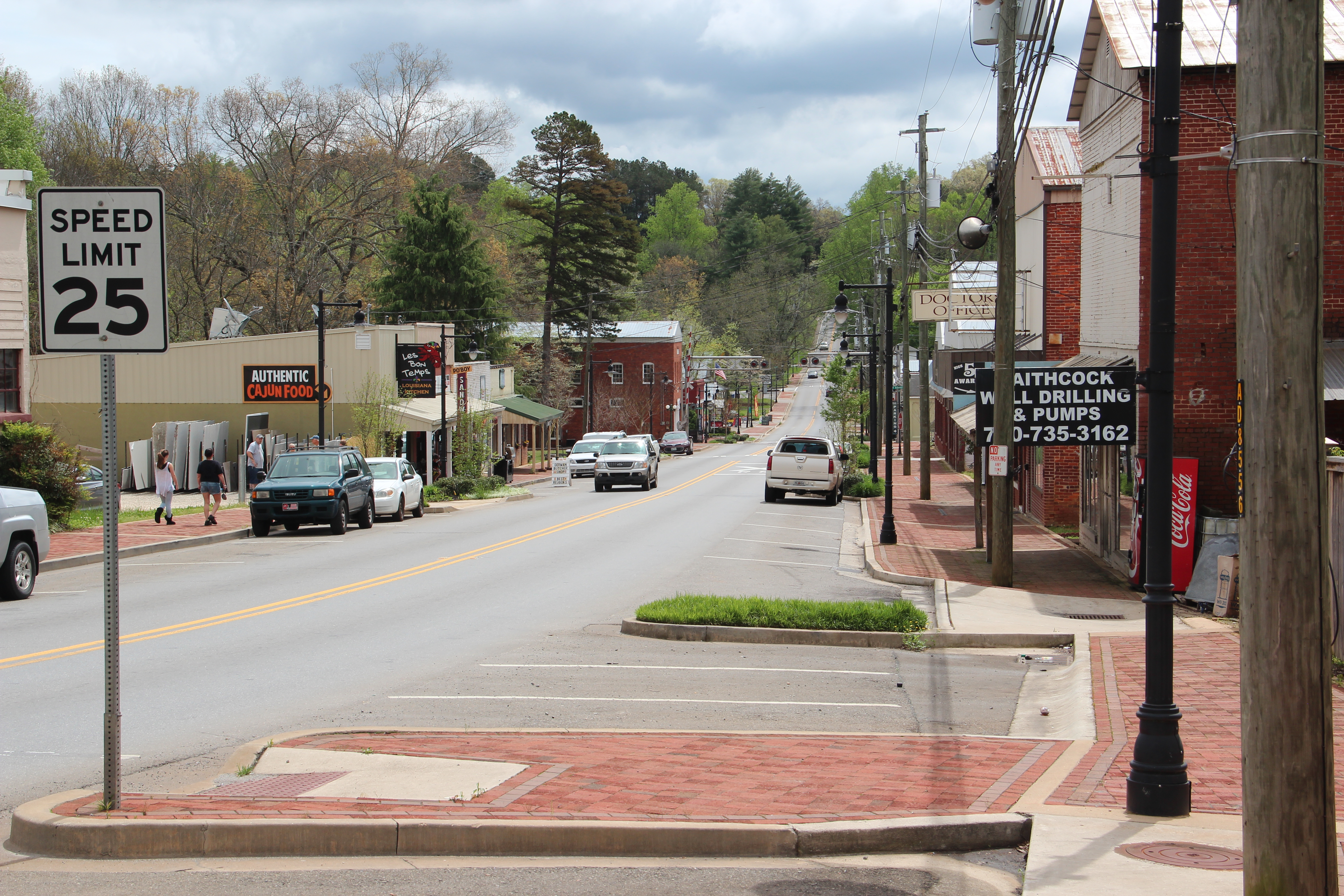
- Ball Ground Historic District

- Seal

- Location in Cherokee County and the state of Georgia

- Location within Georgia Location within the United States
- Coordinates: 34°20′19″N 84°22′39″W
- Country: United States
- State: Georgia
- County: Cherokee

Government
  - Mayor: Dennis Nelson

Area
  - Total: 6.35 sq mi (16.44 km^{2})
  - Land: 6.31 sq mi (16.34 km^{2})
  - Water: 0.035 sq mi (0.09 km^{2})
- Elevation: 1,102 ft (336 m)

Population (2020)
  - Total: 2,560
  - Density: 405.7/sq mi (156.63/km^{2})
- Time zone: UTC-5 (Eastern (EST))
  - Summer (DST): UTC-4 (EDT)
- ZIP code: 30107
- Area codes: 770/678/470
- FIPS code: 13-05036
- GNIS feature ID: 0354443
- Website: cityofballground.com

Ball Ground is a city in Cherokee County, Georgia, United States. The city was originally Cherokee territory before they were removed from the land and it was given to white settlers. A railroad was built in 1882 and a town was formed around the resulting railroad stop. The town was incorporated on January 1, 1883, and became an industrial-based economy largely centered around its marble industry until around the mid-20th century when the industries began to leave and the city started to decline. From 2000 onwards the city saw rapid growth; as of the 2020 census the city had a population of 2,560, which is over three times the city's population of 730 in 2000.

== History ==
=== Early history and settlement ===
The area that encompasses Ball Ground was originally inhabited by both the Cherokee and the Muscogee Creek, until the Battle of Taliwa, which took place in what later became Ball Ground in 1755, between the Cherokee and the Muscogee Creek, ending with a Cherokee victory and forcing the Creek out of the territory.

Following the passing of the Indian Removal Act in 1830, the Cherokee were slowly relocated out of Cherokee County, including the Ball Ground area. The area of Ball Ground and the surrounding Cherokee County was distributed to European-Americans via the 1832 Georgia Land Lotteries, though the lands were not settled by them until the 1835 Treaty of New Echota caused the Cherokee to fully leave North Georgia and relocate west of the Mississippi River as part of the Cherokee removal out of North Georgia.

The name Ball Ground was initially given by settlers to refer to an area of land, not for the town or community. Native Americans would use the area as a ballground to play a game similar to town ball, and settlers named the town Ball Ground in reference to this. Over time details were added to the story of why the town was named Ball Ground. One such story was that the site was so named because it was the location of a 1532 game of ball between Native Americans playing against Hernando de Soto and his men, in a game umpired by the owner of the Fountain of Youth. When a fight broke out during the game, the umpire was killed, taking the secret of the location of the Fountain of Youth with him. Another story attested as "local folklore" by the Cherokee County Chamber of Commerce says that the site is named Ball Ground because of a game of stickball played between the Cherokee and Creek "for the prize of a thousand square miles of land".

After acquisition from the Cherokee in the 1830s, Ball Ground was originally settled as farmland and had few people living in the area. By 1847, the Ball Ground area had a post office, which was one of ten post offices within Cherokee County. In 1882, just before the town was established, Ball Ground had six homes and two country stores.

Meetings were held in 1875 in various areas including Ball Ground to discuss the possibility of a railroad being built through Ball Ground and other nearby areas. In 1881 work began on a railroad to Ball Ground using chain gangs for labor and grading on the railroad's path was completed in Ball Ground that same year. The resulting track was part of the Marietta and North Georgia Railroad and was completed in 1882. Upon completion the terminus of the railroad was the newly constructed depot in Ball Ground.

A town was built around the Ball Ground depot using surrounding land that was donated by thirteen nearby landowners for the express purpose of establishing a town. The deed of transfer to the railroad company noted that “The consideration moving each of us in the establishing of this town is the enhanced value to our lands within and adjacent to the said town, and the general benefit to the country, by which we shall be benefited.” The donated land was split into 200 lots and sold via an auction held in Ball Ground on April 18, 1883, along with other additional properties including a 65 acres (26 ha; 0.102 sq mi) farm and a nearby mill. The next year in 1884, the town had approximately 300 residents.

=== Incorporation as a town ===
Ball Ground was incorporated as a town by town charter on September 27, 1883, by an act of the Georgia General Assembly. The town limits were set as "one half mile in every direction from the present railroad crossing on the Gilmer Ferry road; that it shall be known and distinguished as the town of Ball Ground."

In January 1896 a judge approved the sale of the Marietta and North Georgia railroad to the Atlanta, Knoxville, and Northern railway due to nonpayment of loans by the former railroad. The property to be sold included the depots along the railroad route which included the Ball Ground depot. The plaintiffs in the case were those owed money by the railroad and gave loans that were taken out to charter the railroad, but the scheduled April 1896 sale of the railroad was subsequently delayed through the courts by order of the same judge that initially approved the sale. That same month the Marietta and North Georgia railroad missed their payment deadline and the sale moved forward. On November 1, 1896, the Marietta and North Georgia Railroad was purchased by and turned over to the Atlanta, Knoxville, and Northern railway. Atlanta, Knoxville, and Northern was sold to the Louisville and Nashville Railroad in 1902.

An amendment to the town's charter was passed in 1903 to change the election times, clarifying the issuance of liquor licenses and set a price for said license at "not less than $500". The amendment also clarified how ad valorem taxes were to be collected. A further amendment in 1905 changed the 1903 amendment's $500 liquor license fee to $5,000. An updated charter passed by an act of the Georgia General Assembly in 1911 greatly expanded the powers of the municipal government, including the ability to pass municipal ordinances, and established a school district within Ball Ground.

In 1961 a Ball Ground Improvement Association was formed to add improvements to the city including new paint, a city park, and street lights.

=== Revitalization ===
A television documentary aired in December 1971 on North Georgia's Channel 11 that focused on the city of Ball Ground and described it as a city in decline, and interviewed Ball Grounders about "the slow deterioration of the town." Two weeks after the broadcast of the documentary, the city's merchants announced that they had organized the Ball Ground Merchants Association to promote trade and to function as a Chamber of Commerce for the city.

The Ball Ground Community Association was formed in early 1972 to promote the town and to organize festivals and cultural events. The first event the association organized was the May 1972 spring festival and parade, which included a delegation from the Cherokee Nation. This marked the first time the Cherokee returned to the area in any official capacity since they were removed from the area during the 1830s. As part of the festival, two Cherokee teams played a game of stickball against one another, and then-Lieutenant Governor Lester Maddox served as the parade's grand marshal. Later that year in November 1972, in part because of the festival and other improvements to the city, Ball Ground won the "1972 Stay & See Georgia" contest, which was a program designed to help highlight and expand tourism within the State of Georgia. The spring festival was held annually until 1989.

In 1997 developers began building new homes and communities within Ball Ground. Because of the growth of the city, residents and city officials began discussing the need for an improved sewer system to help modernize the septic systems of older homes and to attract new growth for the city.

In 1998 a plan was put in place to begin work on a $2.8 million sewage system. The sewage system was completed in Fall 2003 amid ongoing development in and around Ball Ground.

== Geography ==
Ball Ground is located at the foothills of the North Georgia mountains in the northeastern portion of Cherokee County. The city is 4.7 mi (7.6 km) northeast of the city of Canton and 0.4 mi (0.64 km) south of Nelson. It is the northernmost city in Cherokee County that is fully within the county limits, as the city of Nelson is partially within Pickens County. Ball Ground is 37.9 mi (61 km) north of Georgia's capital city of Atlanta's northernmost city limits and 48.7 mi (78 km) from downtown Atlanta.

Ball Ground lies within the Upper Piedmont Physiographic Province in a narrow band of land called the Hightower-Jasper Ridge District, which has a different land structure and lithology than the surrounding areas. The bedrock underneath the city consists of igneous and metamorphic rocks such as gneiss and schist. The land in and around Ball Ground is rich in marble deposits as well as talc, pyrite, and gold.

According to the United States Census Bureau as of 2020, Ball Ground has a total area of 6.3 sq mi (16 km^{2}), of which 0.04 sq mi (0.10 km^{2}), or 0.63%, is water. The city's elevation averages around 1,100 ft (340 m) above sea level, ranging from just over 1,000 ft (300 m) in the valleys to around 1,200 ft (370 m) on several hilltops within the city. Unlike most other parts of Cherokee County, Ball Ground is not in a floodplain and has no typically flood prone areas. To protect the water and surrounding lands, the city government has ordinances in place for stream buffer protection, watershed protection, and wetland protection.

=== Climate ===
The climate of Ball Ground, as with most of the southeastern United States, is humid subtropical (Cfa) according to the Köppen classification, with four seasons including hot, humid summers and cool winters. July and August are generally the warmest months of the year with an average high of around 85 °F (29 °C). The coldest month is January which has an average high of around 48 °F (9 °C).

Ball Ground receives rainfall distributed fairly evenly throughout the year as typical of southeastern U.S. cities, with March on average having the highest average precipitation at 5.15 in (131 mm), and May typically being the driest month with 3.81 in (97 mm).

Climate data for Ball Ground, Georgia (1981-2010)
Month	Jan	Feb	Mar	Apr	May	Jun	Jul	Aug	Sep	Oct	Nov	Dec	Year
Mean daily maximum °F (°C)	48 (9)	53 (12)	62 (17)	70 (21)	76 (24)	82 (28)	85 (29)	85 (29)	79 (26)	71 (22)	61 (16)	51 (11)	69 (20)
Mean daily minimum °F (°C)	29 (−2)	30 (−1)	37 (3)	45 (7)	54 (12)	62 (17)	66 (19)	66 (19)	59 (15)	48 (9)	39 (4)	31 (−1)	47 (8)
Average precipitation inches (mm)	5.14 (131)	5.01 (127)	5.15 (131)	4.00 (102)	3.81 (97)	4.22 (107)	4.70 (119)	4.61 (117)	4.67 (119)	4.07 (103)	4.28 (109)	4.45 (113)	54.11 (1,375)
Source: US Climate Data

== Demographics ==
Historical population
Census	Pop.	Note	%±
1890	296		—
1900	302		2.0%
1910	443		46.7%
1920	809		82.6%
1930	706		−12.7%
1940	711		0.7%
1950	700		−1.5%
1960	707		1.0%
1970	617		−12.7%
1980	640		3.7%
1990	905		41.4%
2000	730		−19.3%
2010	1,433		96.3%
2020	2,560		78.6%
2025 (est.)	3,470	▲	35.5%
U.S. Decennial Census; 2025

=== 2020 census ===
As of the 2020 census, Ball Ground had a population of 2,560, an increase of 78.6% from 2010. There were 938 households and 626 families residing in the city, and the population density was 406.3/sq mi (156.9/km^{2}).

The median age was 38.9 years. 24.2% of residents were under the age of 18 and 17.1% of residents were 65 years of age or older. For every 100 females there were 92.2 males, and for every 100 females age 18 and over there were 91.0 males age 18 and over.

0.0% of residents lived in urban areas, while 100.0% lived in rural areas.

Of all households, 38.7% had children under the age of 18 living in them, 63.4% were married-couple households, 10.6% were households with a male householder and no spouse or partner present, and 20.4% were households with a female householder and no spouse or partner present. About 16.4% of all households were made up of individuals, and 8.2% had someone living alone who was 65 years of age or older.

There were 977 housing units, of which 4.0% were vacant. The homeowner vacancy rate was 2.0% and the rental vacancy rate was 1.4%.

Ball Ground racial composition
Race	Num.	Perc.
White (non-Hispanic)	2,300	89.84%
Black or African American (non-Hispanic)	21	0.82%
Native American	7	0.27%
Asian	6	0.23%
Other/Mixed	104	4.06%
Hispanic or Latino	122	4.77%

=== 2010 census ===
During the 2010 census the population had grown 96.3% to 1,433.

=== 2000 census ===
The results of the 2000 United States census showed that Ball Ground had shrunk in population in the previous ten years, going from a population of 905 in 1990 to 730 in 2000.

After the improvements to the sewage infrastructure and the development of homes and businesses in and around Ball Ground in the 2000s, the city began to see large amounts of growth.

=== Households and housing ===
According to the 2020 American Community Survey, the average household size was 2.66 and the average family size was 3.03.

=== Income and poverty ===
The median income for a household in the city was $81,900, and the median income for a family was $92,690. Males had a median income of $51,393 versus $40,893 for females. The per capita income for the city was $18,147. About 4% of the population was below the poverty line, including 6.2% of those under age 18 and 0.8% of those age 65 or over.

== Economy ==
When Ball Ground was first established, a large portion of its economy was based on agriculture and the railroad that passed through town, which brought marble from Tate, Georgia to be processed and finished by marble companies in Ball Ground. In the early 1900s the city built up a ginery, saw mill, and a marble mill to mine the marble that was abundant in the area. Beginning in 1898 with the opening of the first marble company in the city, the marble industry became a large part of early Ball Ground's economy and in the 1920s the city had four independent marble finishing mills. The marble industry and other agricultural industrial facilities had largely died down or relocated out of Ball Ground by 1959.

Several companies operated plants in Ball Ground before later relocating. The Coca-Cola Company opened a bottling plant in Ball Ground in 1903 which operated for 30 years, closing in 1933. Tyson Foods operated a feed mill in Ball Ground from 1965 to 1998, when it moved to a larger facility in Bartow County.

The city has an industrial area called the River Mill Industrial Park, which is a 100 acres (40 ha; 0.16 sq mi) area with railroad access.

In May 2015, Universal Alloy Corporation (UAC) announced it was building a new factory in Ball Ground to supply Boeing with parts for aircraft wing assemblies. Universal Alloy (UAC) is one of the largest employers in Cherokee County. UAC completed their 110,000 sq ft (10,000 m^{2}) Ball Ground facility in 2017. UAC is one of Cherokee County's largest employers, with over 500 employees.

== Arts and culture ==
The Sequoyah Regional Library System has a branch in Ball Ground called the Ball Ground Library, a 9,000 sq ft (840 m^{2}) facility with approximately 30,000 books in its collection.

In 1985, the Alfred W. Roberts House was listed on the National Register of Historic Places. It is the only house in Cherokee County that has this recognition. In 2009, the Ball Ground Historic District was listed on the NRHP, for its significance to Native American and early national history. Many homes still present in Ball Ground were built during the 1880s–1920s and are regarded as historic. In 2010, following the State of Georgia passing a law allowing for city governments to establish historic commissions to handle historic preservation efforts within their cities, Ball Ground's city government passed an ordinance establishing an historic preservation commission to encourage historic preservation efforts and to help regulate the status, treatment, and repairs of objects and buildings within the city that are designated as historic.

=== Annual cultural events ===
Since 2014 Ball Ground has held an annual Christmas parade called the March of the Toys Parade, which helps benefit the Toys for Tots program. It was estimated that approximately 5,000 people attended the event in 2017, where attendees are asked to bring unwrapped presents to donate to Toys for Tots.

In the summers, Ball Ground's City Park hosts weekly movies and concerts. During Independence Day celebrations, the city hosts annual fireworks shows around the areas of City Park and Calvin Farmer Park in downtown Ball Ground.

== Parks and recreation ==
Ball Ground has several dedicated parks and recreational facilities within the city that are managed by the city's parks and recreation department. These include a 15 acres (6.1 ha; 0.023 sq mi) park, baseball fields, tennis courts, basketball courts, ponds, open fields, and wooded areas. Several of the parks also have walking trails and areas for fishing.

There are two botanical gardens in Ball Ground. Ball Ground Botanical Gardens is a free-admission 0.75 acres (0.30 ha; 0.00117 sq mi) botanical garden that includes a butterfly-shaped walking trail. Gibbs Gardens is a property in Ball Ground that spans over 300 acres (120 ha; 0.47 sq mi) and includes sixteen individual gardens including several ponds, bridge crossings, and waterfalls. In 2020 Business Jet Traveler ranked Gibbs Gardens #2 on its list of "13 best U.S. botanical gardens". Gibbs Gardens has over 20 million daffodils that bloom in the spring.

1.9 mi (3.1 km) outside of Ball Ground's city limits in unincorporated Ball Ground is the McGraw Ford Wildlife Management Area, a 2,255 acres (913 ha; 3.523 sq mi) wildlife management area along the Etowah River that is managed by the Georgia Department of Natural Resources with various multi-purpose trails along with fishing and hunting areas.

== Government ==
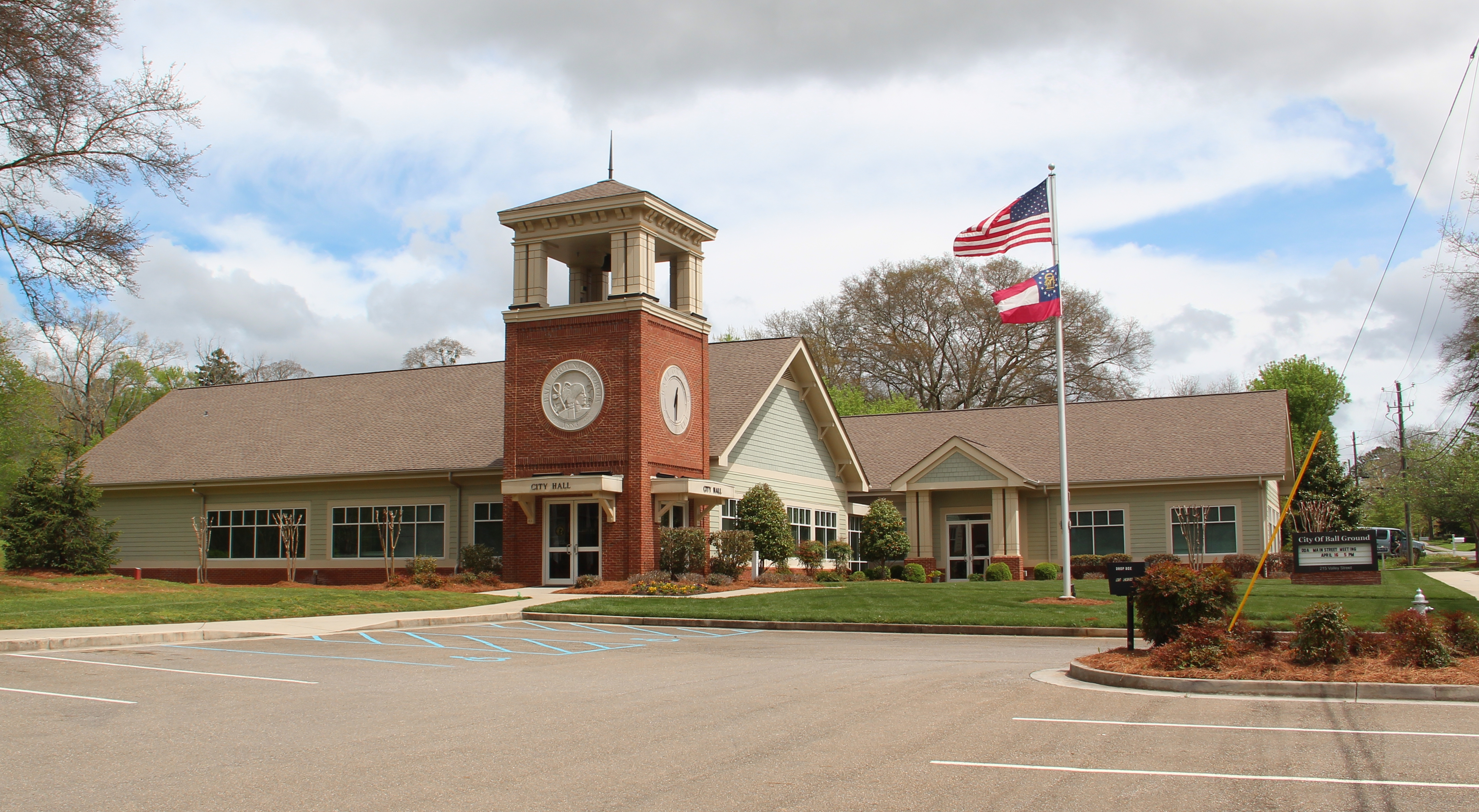
Ball Ground City Hall

Since the incorporation of the town in 1883, the city has been managed by a mayor and city council consisting of five council-members, which meet on the second Thursday of each month. The city government also consists of a city clerk, city attorney, and a city manager.

The city has a municipal court which is held on the third Friday of each month. With the exception of a small police department managed by the city, most services are provided by Cherokee County, including animal control, building inspections, planning and zoning, parks and recreation, and jail operations. Cherokee County Fire Department is responsible for fire protection in Ball Ground, and Cherokee County Fire Station #2 is located in Ball Ground.

In the United States House of Representatives, Ball Ground is split between Georgia's 9th congressional district and Georgia's 11th congressional district. For representation in the state government, Ball Ground is part of the Georgia State Senate's 21st district, and the 22nd district for the Georgia House of Representatives.

== Education ==
Public education for all parts of Ball Ground is administrated by the Cherokee County School District, and students within the city are zoned to the following CCSD schools: Ball Ground Elementary School, Creekland Middle School, and Creekview High School. High School students in Ball Ground also have the option of attending Mountain Education Charter High School (MECHS), an alternative school program that offers evening classes for obtaining a high school diploma. While MECHS has eighteen campuses throughout the North Georgia area, the Cherokee County classes of MECHS are held at the Etowah High School campus in Woodstock, Georgia.

The nearest college or university to Ball Ground is Reinhardt University in Waleska, Georgia in Cherokee County, 12.1 mi (19.5 km) from Ball Ground.

== Media ==
As part of the North Georgia area, Ball Ground's primary network-affiliated television stations are WXIA-TV (NBC), WANF (CBS), WSB-TV (ABC), and WAGA-TV (Fox). WGTV is the local station of the statewide Georgia Public Television network and is a PBS member station.

The city is served by the Atlanta Journal-Constitution which serves the metro-Atlanta area including all of Cherokee County and by the Cherokee Tribune & Ledger-News, which serves as Cherokee County's legal organ.

== Infrastructure ==
=== Transportation ===
Interstate 575 passes through Ball Ground in a southwest-to-northeast direction and the interstate's exit 27, which is also within the city limits, exits onto Howell Bridge Road in Ball Ground. Ball Ground's Exit 27 is the last northbound exit on 575 before the interstate's northern terminus. Portions of Howell Bridge Road are also named State Route 5 Business, which runs through the city in a general west-to-east direction, and intersects with Georgia State Route 5 (also called Ball Ground Highway) within the city. State Route 5 runs parallel to Interstate 575 within the city limits in a similar southwest-to-northeast direction. Georgia State Route 372 (which within the city limits is also named Ball Ground Road, Gilmer Ferry Road, and then A W Roberts Drive) runs through Ball Ground from the southeast, through the center of town before merging with State Route 5/Ball Ground Highway to travel north out of the city.

The nearest airport is the Cherokee County Regional Airport, a small public-use airport with a single asphalt runway located in unincorporated Ball Ground 5.2 mi (8.4 km) from downtown Ball Ground, roughly halfway between the cities of Ball Ground and Canton. The closest major airport is Hartsfield–Jackson Atlanta International Airport, which is 58.3 mi (93.8 km) from Ball Ground. Georgia Northeastern Railroad is a freight rail that runs through and has a stop in Ball Ground. The Ball Ground rail stop is a dedicated team track within the city.

=== Utilities ===
The city's water department manages the water supply via a pumped well system. Sewage treatment within the city is also managed by the city government. Municipal solid waste is handled by Waste Management, a private company under contract with the city government.

=== Health care ===
There is a Northside Hospital-affiliated specialty care facility in Ball Ground. Within the city of Ball Ground there is one pharmacy, a drug rehabilitation center, and two veterinarians. The closest hospital is Northside Hospital Cherokee, 9.4 mi (15.1 km) from Ball Ground

== Notable people ==
- Keith R. Blackwell, former Associate Justice of the Supreme Court of Georgia
- Russ Lyon, professional baseball player
- Garland F. Pinholster, Oglethorpe University coach and Georgia State legislator
