= Ball Ground Historic District =

- U.S. National Register of Historic Places
- U.S. Historic district
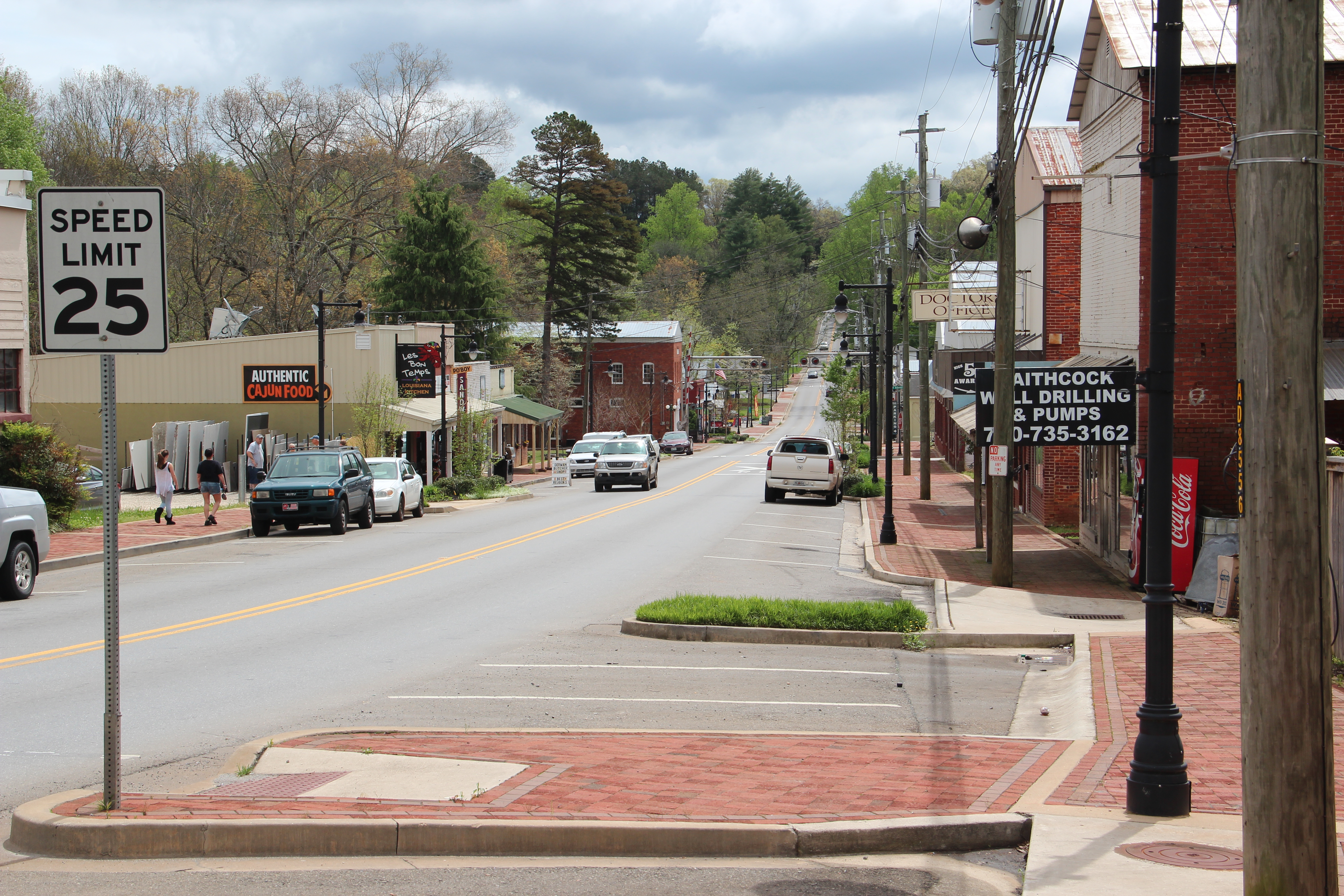
- Georgia Rte 372 in Ball Ground Historic District

- Location within Georgia
- Location: Ball Ground, Georgia
- Coordinates: 34.339158°N 84.378172°W
- Area: 22 acres (8.9 ha)
- Architectural style: Late-Victorian (Queen Anne and Italianate); Late 19th and Early 20th Century Revivals (Colonial Revival, Classical Revival, Commercial Style, and Bungalow/Craftsman)
- NRHP reference No.: 09001057
- Added to NRHP: December 4, 2009

The Ball Ground Historic District in Ball Ground, Georgia is a 22 acres (8.9 ha) historic district which is roughly bounded by Highway 5 to the west; Commerce Street and Groover Street to the north; Valley Street and Gazaway Lane to the east; and Stripling Street, the southern terminus of Old Canton Road, and Depot Street to the south. It was listed on the National Register of Historic Places October 30, 2009 and included 114 contributing buildings and four contributing sites.

The National Park Service summary description of the area states:

The district is a relatively intact railroad community located in northeastern Cherokee County in the foothills of the north Georgia mountains including both commercial and residential areas roughly following the main east-west and north-south streets. The gridiron street pattern is not rigid due to terrain and the curvilinear path of the railroad through town. The railroad corridor parallels Old Canton Road in a generally north-south direction separated by one large town block.

Most of the commercial buildings are located in a central three-block area along the east-west Gilmer Ferry Road dating from the 1900s to the 1930s. This area is characterized by one- and two-story brick buildings, some freestanding and some attached with party walls. Most abut the sidewalks. Marble and other stones are sometimes used as secondary materials or simple trim. Most commercial buildings once had flat roofs with parapets, but they have been topped with non-historic gable-front metal roof extensions. The original building form is usually still visible. Metal sheeting placed on the upper facades of some stores obscures a few historic details. First-floor storefront areas generally remain intact, and maintain integrity.

Residential areas fan outward from the central business district with no clear delineation. Houses do not follow a contiguous pattern of development, and one street could contain homes that fall within a span of 60 years. Most date from the 1880s to the 1950s in varied sizes and types, ranging from two-room workers' cottages to expansive hilltop landmarks. Few have a formal academic style. Residential lots range from one-quarter acre to one acre or larger in size, depending on whether they once supported agricultural plots. The Alfred W. Roberts House, listed in the National Register in 1985, is one of Ball Ground's largest houses, reflecting elements of several styles as it was expanded over time by the family.

There are also a few large industrial and warehouse buildings related to the marble and monument industry, usually located near the railroad. Some undeveloped lots were used for monument storage. Community landmarks include an elementary school (c.1948 with later additions), a former downtown post office (c.1966), the Ball Ground Baptist Church and Cemetery (1916 with later alterations), the Old Methodist Church (1916), the former City Hall (c.1900), the Ball Ground Community Cemetery, Lion's Club Field, and the Roberts Building/Masonic Hall (1923).

== See also ==
- National Register of Historic Places listings in Cherokee County, Georgia
