= Cherokee County Regional Airport =

Airport in Georgia, United States

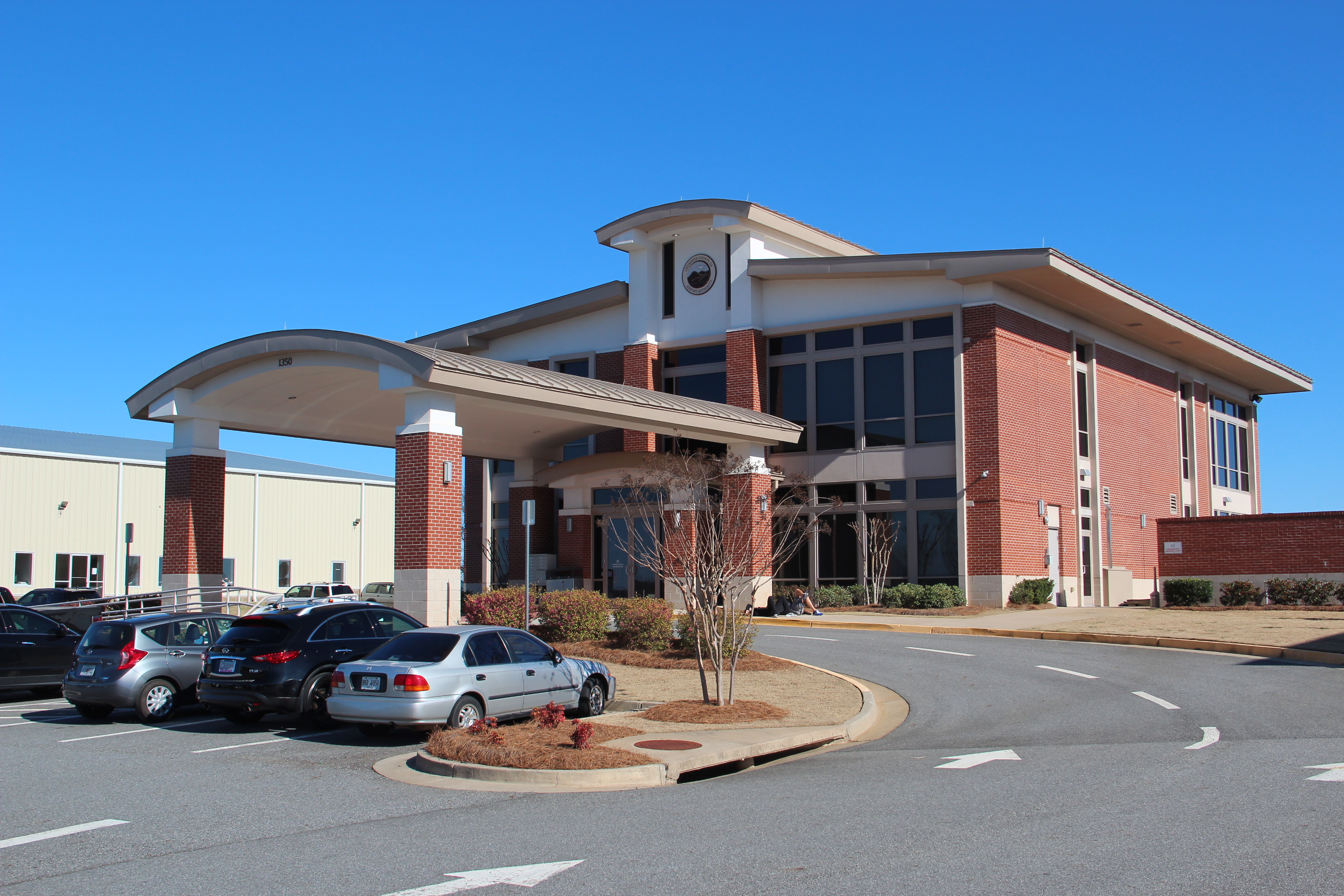
- IATA: none; ICAO: KCNI; FAA LID: CNI

Summary
- Airport type: Public
- Owner: Cherokee County Airport Authority
- Serves: Canton, Georgia
- Location: Ball Ground, Georgia
- Elevation AMSL: 1,219 ft (372 m)
- Coordinates: 34°18′38″N 084°25′26″W

Map
- Location of airport in Georgia KCNI/CNI (the United States)

Runways
Direction	Length		Surface
Direction	ft	m	Surface
5/23	5,002	1,524	Asphalt

Statistics (2011)
- Aircraft operations: 24,000
- Based aircraft: 88
- Source: Federal Aviation Administration

Cherokee County Regional Airport (ICAO: KCNI, FAA LID: CNI,formerly 47A) is a county-owned public-use airport in Cherokee County, Georgia, United States. It is located six nautical miles (7 mi, 11 km) northeast of the central business district of Canton, Georgia. The airport is adjacent to Interstate 575, about halfway between the city of Canton and the city of Ball Ground.

Although most U.S. airports use the same three-letter location identifier for the FAA and IATA, Cherokee County Regional Airport is assigned CNI by the FAA but has no designation from the IATA (which assigned CNI to Changhai Dachangshandao Airport in Liaoning, China). It was previously 47A when it was known as the Cherokee County Airport, prior to improvements made in the 2010s.

A redevelopment project currently underway includes an already completed 10,000-square-foot (930 m^{2}) terminal; the ongoing lengthening of the runway from its previous 3,414 feet (1,041 m) to 5,000 feet (1,524 m); a new parallel taxiway; instrument landing equipment; and new hangars. The new facilities will accommodate 200 hangared corporate aircraft and provide 100 tie-downs for smaller aircraft.

== Facilities and aircraft ==
Cherokee County Airport covers an area of 160 acres (65 ha) at an elevation of 1,219 feet (372 m) above mean sea level. It has one runway designated 5/23 with an asphalt surface measuring 5,002 by 75 feet (1,525 × 23 m).

For the 12-month period ending July 2, 2011, the airport had 24,000 general aviation aircraft operations, an average of 65 per day. At that time there were 88 aircraft based at this airport: 78.4% single-engine, 15% multi-engine, 1% jet, 3% helicopter, and 2% ultralight.

It has a non-directional beacon (callsign WRLB3306) on AM longwave 416 kHz, which identifies itself with DJD in Morse code tones, then announces the name twice, followed by "automated altimeter", and the local sea-level pressure in inches of mercury (such as "two-niner-niner-five" for 29.95).

== See also ==
- List of airports in Georgia (U.S. state)
