= Colonial Theater (Canton, North Carolina) =

Historic movie theater in North Carolina, US

- U.S. National Register of Historic Places
- U.S. Historic district – Contributing property
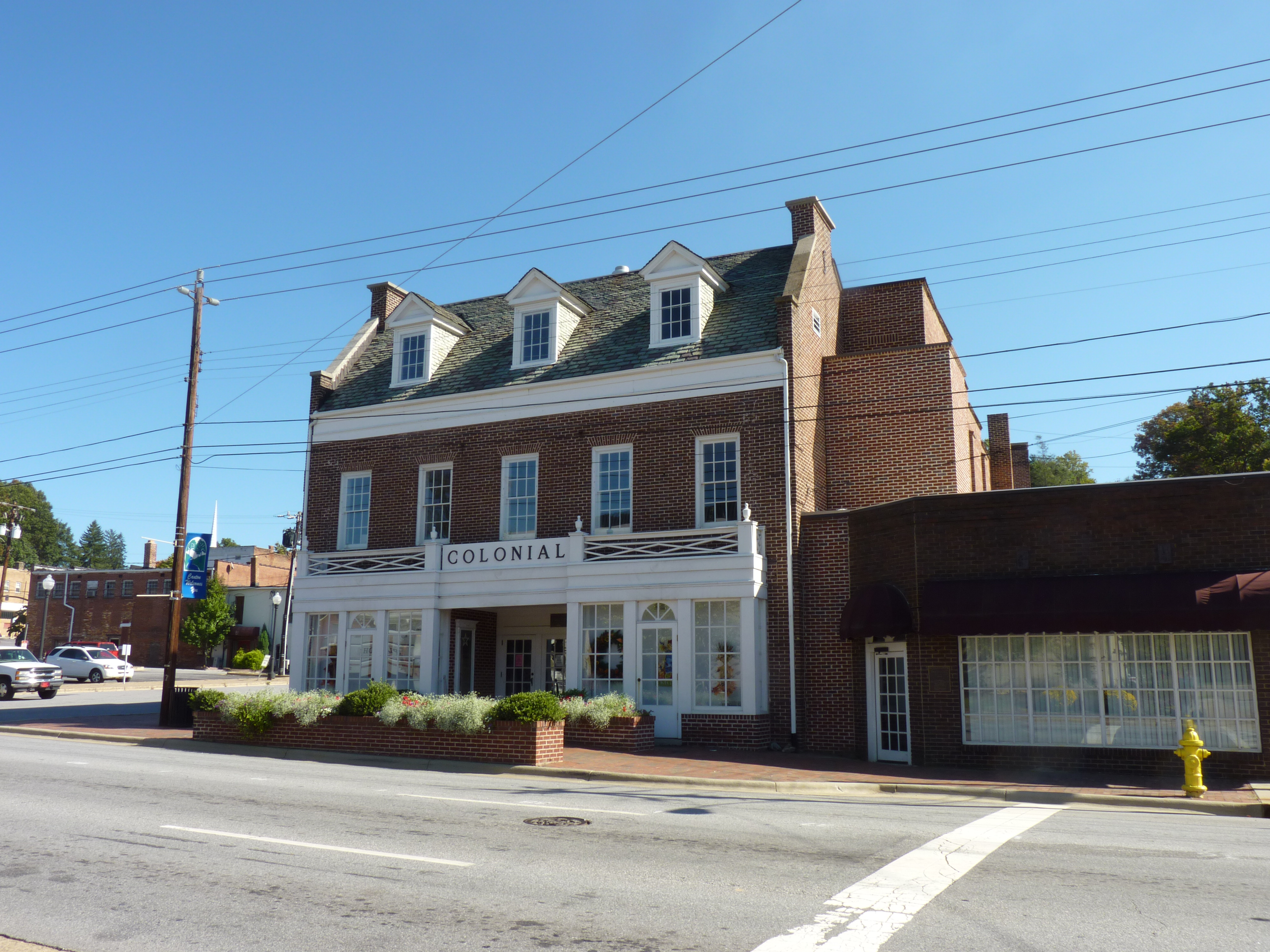
- Colonial Theater, October 2011

- Location within North Carolina Location within the United States
- Location: 55-57 Park St., Canton, North Carolina
- Coordinates: 35°31′56″N 82°50′24″W
- Area: 0.8 acres (0.32 ha)
- Built: 1932
- Architect: Benton & Benton
- Architectural style: Colonial Revival
- NRHP reference No.: 00000226
- Added to NRHP: March 15, 2000

The Colonial Theatre is a historic movie theater located at Canton, Haywood County, North Carolina. It was designed by Benton & Benton and built in 1932. It is a 2 1/2-story, five bay Colonial Revival-style brick building. The theater auditorium has 650 seats, including the auditorium and the balcony. The Colonial Theater has been renovated and is now used for concerts, movies, and plays.

It was listed on the National Register of Historic Places in 2000. It is located in the Canton Main Street Historic District.
