= Walter Victor =

American photographer

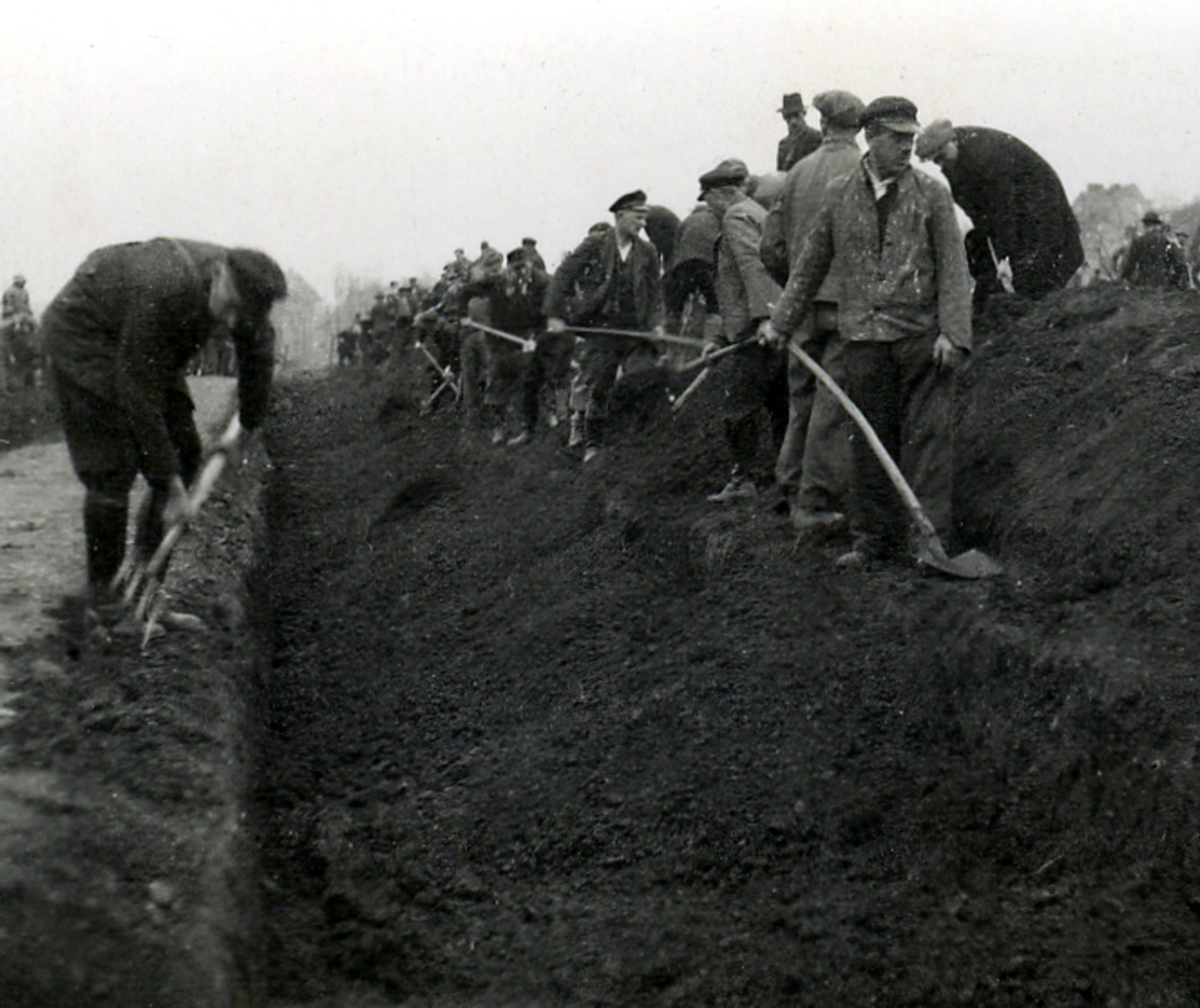
Photo of the Dora Mittelbau mass grave taken by Victor

Walter John Victor (July 1, 1917 – October 14, 2014) was an American photographer and World War II veteran.

== Biography ==
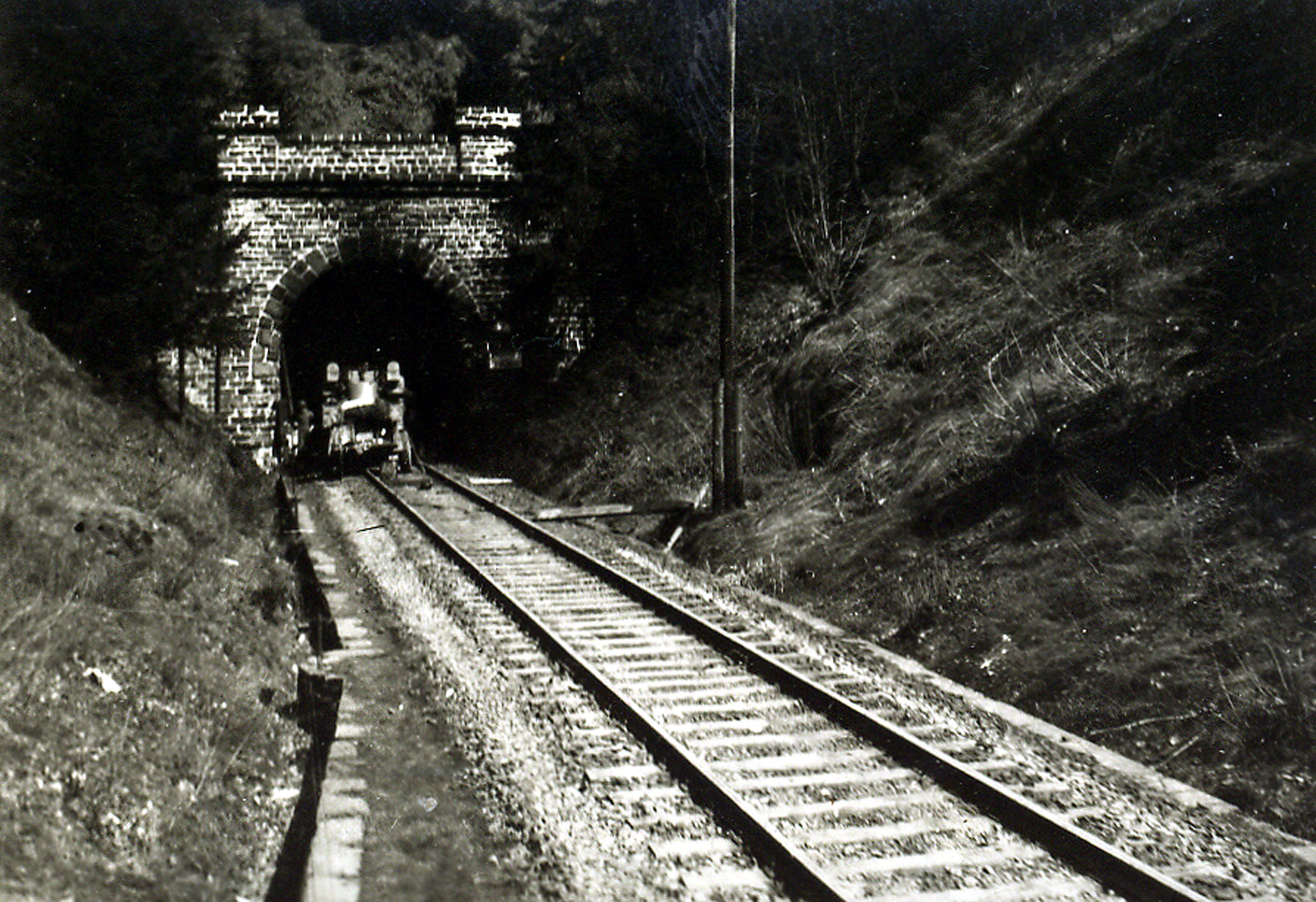
Photo of the Dora Mittelbau rocket assembly tunnels, where parts for the Mittelwerk V-2 rockets were stored, taken by Victor

He was born in Dupont, Pennsylvania to Frank and Agnes Victor. He later moved to Dawsonville, Georgia. Victor fought at Utah Beach on D-Day, June 6, 1944, serving as a gunsmith for the 9th Infantry Division. His division also assisted the liberation of Dachau concentration camp. Victor was named a Chevalier of the Legion of Honor in May 2010 for his service. He also earned one Silver Star and two Bronze Stars. In 1966, he became a team photographer for the Atlanta Braves. The Braves named the first base camera well at Turner Field for Victor in 2006. Twelve of his photographs are housed in the National Baseball Hall of Fame and Museum. A compilation of his work was included in the book Brave at Heart: The Life and Lens of Walter Victor, published in 2007. Victor was a Master Mason belonging to the Etowah Lodge in Dawsonville, Georgia. He was married to Ruth and had four children. Victor died on October 14, 2014, aged 97, and was interred at Georgia National Cemetery.
