= Champion International =

Former paper and wood products producer

Champion International was a large paper and wood products producer based since 1980 in Stamford, Connecticut. It was acquired by International Paper in 2000.

From 1893 it had been based in Hamilton, Ohio, expanding to plants in Texas and Western North Carolina by the 1930s. It was the largest coated paper manufacturer in the country through World War II, but struggled in the decades after that with industrial, labor and environmental issues.

== History ==
The company was founded by Peter G. Thomson, who had purchased patents for a card coating machine from Charles H. Gage, president of the Champion Card and Paper Co. of Pepperell, Massachusetts. In exchange Gage received a half-interest in Thomson's venture. Thomson established the Champion Coated Paper Co. in 1893, building a plant in Hamilton, Ohio, along the Great Miami River, 20 miles (32 km) north of Cincinnati. Thomson at first advertised his company as the "western branch" of the better-known Massachusetts concern. Thomson soon bought out Gage, and moved the entire Champion operation to Ohio.

The Champion factory was completely destroyed in a December 1901 fire. It was rebuilt and back in operation by June 1902. The factory was destroyed again in the Great Flood of 1913, when fire broke out. The factory was rebuilt in three months.

In the late 1930s, Champion opened a plant in Pasadena, Texas. It also had a paper mill in Canton, North Carolina, in the western part of the state.

After Peter Thomson died in 1931, the company was taken over by his second eldest son, Alexander. Another son, Logan, took over Champion in 1935, and remained in charge until his death in 1946.

Champion was the largest coated paper manufacturer in the country through World War II, but struggled after the war. The company laid off a third of its workforce in 1961, and merged with U. S. Plywood Corp. in 1967, forming U. S. Plywood-Champion Papers Inc. The name was changed to Champion International Corp. in 1972. In 1977, Champion took over Hoerner Waldorf, then the fourth-largest manufacturer of paper bags and boxes in the United States.

In the 1980s, Champion's Chief Executive Officer, Andrew C. Sigler, pushed the company to find ways to redesign and improve manufacturing operations and quality of products. This led to a decade-long transformation, guided by principles of sociotechnical design. The success of the initial projects led the whole company to adopt the process. By various measures of revenue, output, and quality, the changes were successful. In a $2 billion dollar deal, Champion merged with St. Regis Corporation in the summer of 1984; St. Regis had been a takeover target of Rupert Murdoch.

By the 1990s, environmental concerns were affecting the company's prospects for future growth. In the US, a growing awareness that the country was running out of space in its garbage dumps signaled changes in the markets served by the paper industry. Minimum standards for the use of recycled paper were increasingly adopted. Concerns about water pollution and toxic waste byproducts of the milling process were growing. In particular, Champion settled several lawsuits brought by North Carolina and Tennessee over operations at their Canton, North Carolina site and, by 1999, had sold the paper mill there. Also in the 1990s, Champion sold its timberland in Oregon, California, Mississippi and North Carolina to Hancock Timber.

The company's stock price was stagnant by the late 1990s as a new CEO, Richard Olson, came to the helm.

In 1980, the company headquarters had moved to Stamford, Connecticut, at One Champion Plaza (now 400 Atlantic Street). In 2000, Champion was bought by International Paper, which moved its headquarters office from Purchase, New York, to Champion's headquarters in Stamford. The Champion International building had been a cultural attraction for more than 20 years, hosting a small art museum known as the "Whitney at Champion". In 2005, International Paper moved their headquarters to Tennessee. Their former headquarters at 400 Atlantic Street was sold to the Landis Group, who stopped providing free space to the Whitney.

International Paper announced in September 2013 that it would shut down operations at its Courtland Mill facility in Courtland, Alabama, which had been one of the area's largest employers since 1970. The abrupt announcement created economic and environmental concerns in Lawrence County, Alabama. Residents, current employees, and local businesses hoped the vacated facility would serve as home for another company but braced for a devastating economic impact. In March 2017, crews began the demolition of the 2,200-acre (890-hectare) facility.
