= Georgia National Cemetery =

Veterans cemetery located near Canton, Cherokee County, Georgia

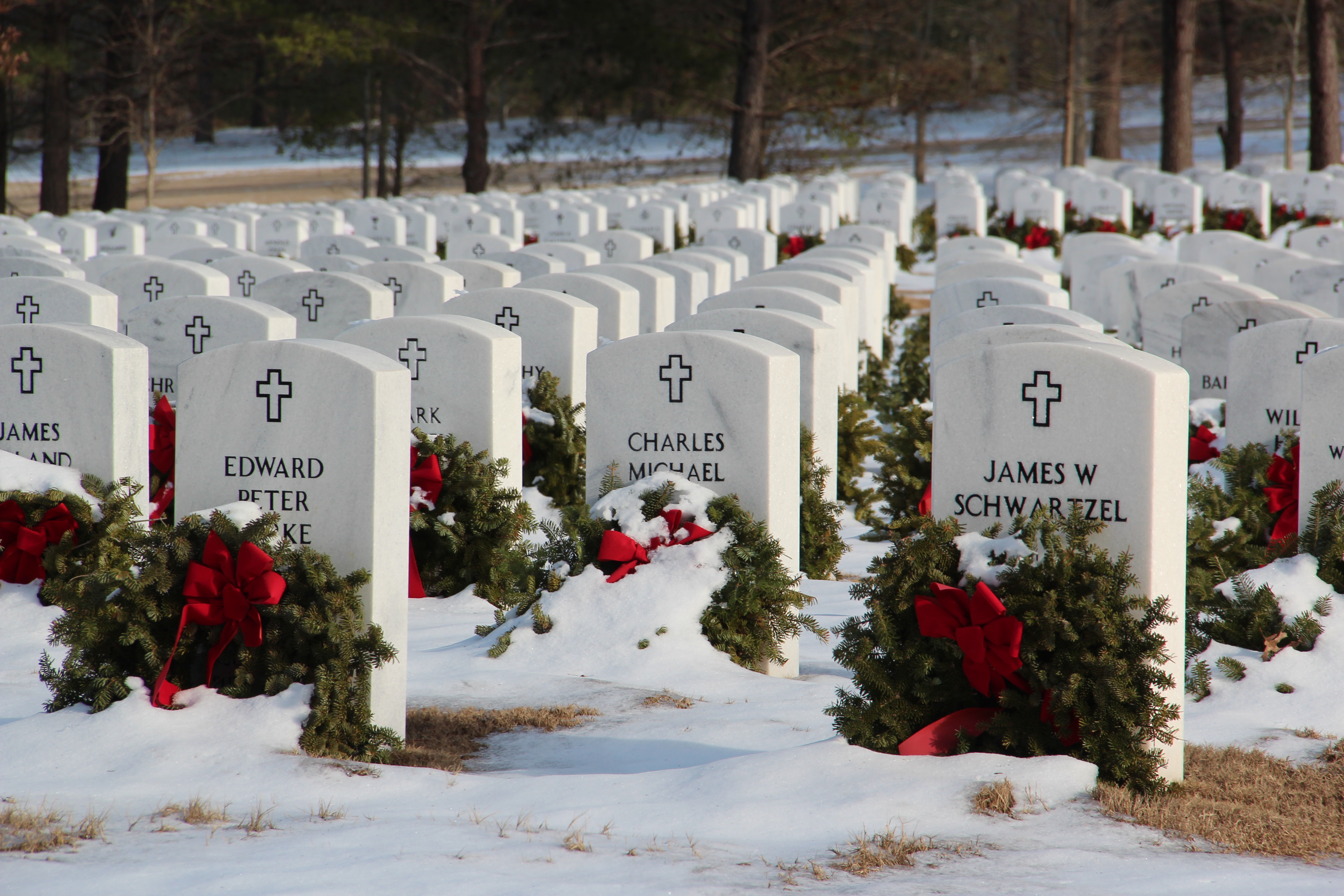
- Gravestones in the Georgia National Cemetery
- Interactive map of Georgia National Cemetery

Details
- Established: 2006
- Location: Canton, Georgia
- Country: United States
- Coordinates: 34°14′09″N 84°34′50″W
- Type: United States National Cemetery
- Size: 774.9 acres (313.6 ha)
- No. of graves: ~38,000
- Find a Grave: Georgia National Cemetery

Georgia National Cemetery is a United States National Cemetery located near the city of Canton, in Cherokee County, Georgia. Managed by the United States Department of Veterans Affairs, it encompasses 774.9 acres (313.6 ha), and has been undergoing development with the intention of servicing the interment needs of United States military veterans and their families for the next fifty years.

== History ==
The land for the cemetery was donated by land developer and World War II veteran, Scott Hudgens. J. M. Wilkerson Construction Company, Inc. was hired to develop the land. The cemetery opened for interments on April 24, 2006 with space available for nearly 300,000 grave sites. As of 2026, more than 36,000 were interred on the site.

== Notable interments ==
- F. Lee Bailey, attorney
- Benjamin B. Blackburn, US congressman
- Ji-Tu Cumbuka, actor
- Walter Victor, photographer
