= Canton Commercial Historic District =

- U.S. National Register of Historic Places
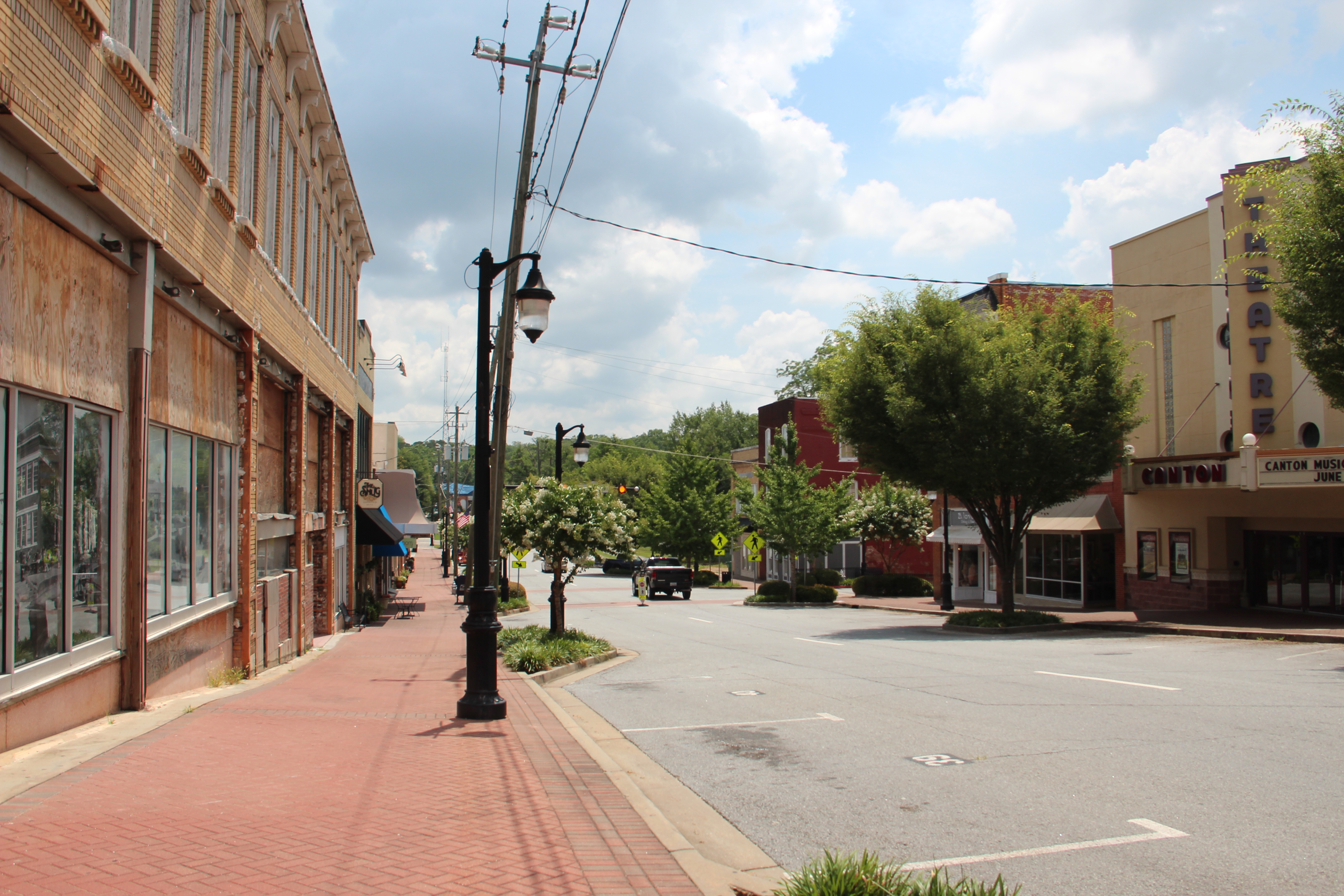

- Location within Georgia
- Location: Roughly bounded by Main, Church, Archer, and Marietta Sts., Canton, Georgia
- Coordinates: 34°14′12″N 84°29′27″W
- Area: 2 acres (0.81 ha)
- Architectural style: Late Victorian, Victorian Eclectic
- NRHP reference No.: 84000962
- Added to NRHP: January 12, 1984

The Canton Commercial Historic District in Canton, Georgia is a 2 acres (0.81 ha) historic district which is roughly bounded by Main, Church, Archer, and Marietta Streets. It was listed on the National Register of Historic Places in 1984 and included 10 contributing buildings.

It was deemed significant in architecture for its "collection of modest late-nineteenth- and early-twentieth-century commercial buildings that reflect the types and styles of buildings built in the central business districts of Georgia's small towns. In terms of commerce, the district is significant for representing the intact portion of Canton's historic central business district."

It includes:

- Bank of Canton (1892), Beaux Arts-style
- Canton Theatre (1913, remodeled ca. 1940) Art Moderne-style.

The Cherokee County Courthouse, also National Register-listed, is about a block away from the district.

== See also ==
- Canton Historic District (Canton, Georgia)
