= Upper Downtown Canton Historic District =

Historic district in Ohio, United States

- U.S. National Register of Historic Places
- U.S. Historic district
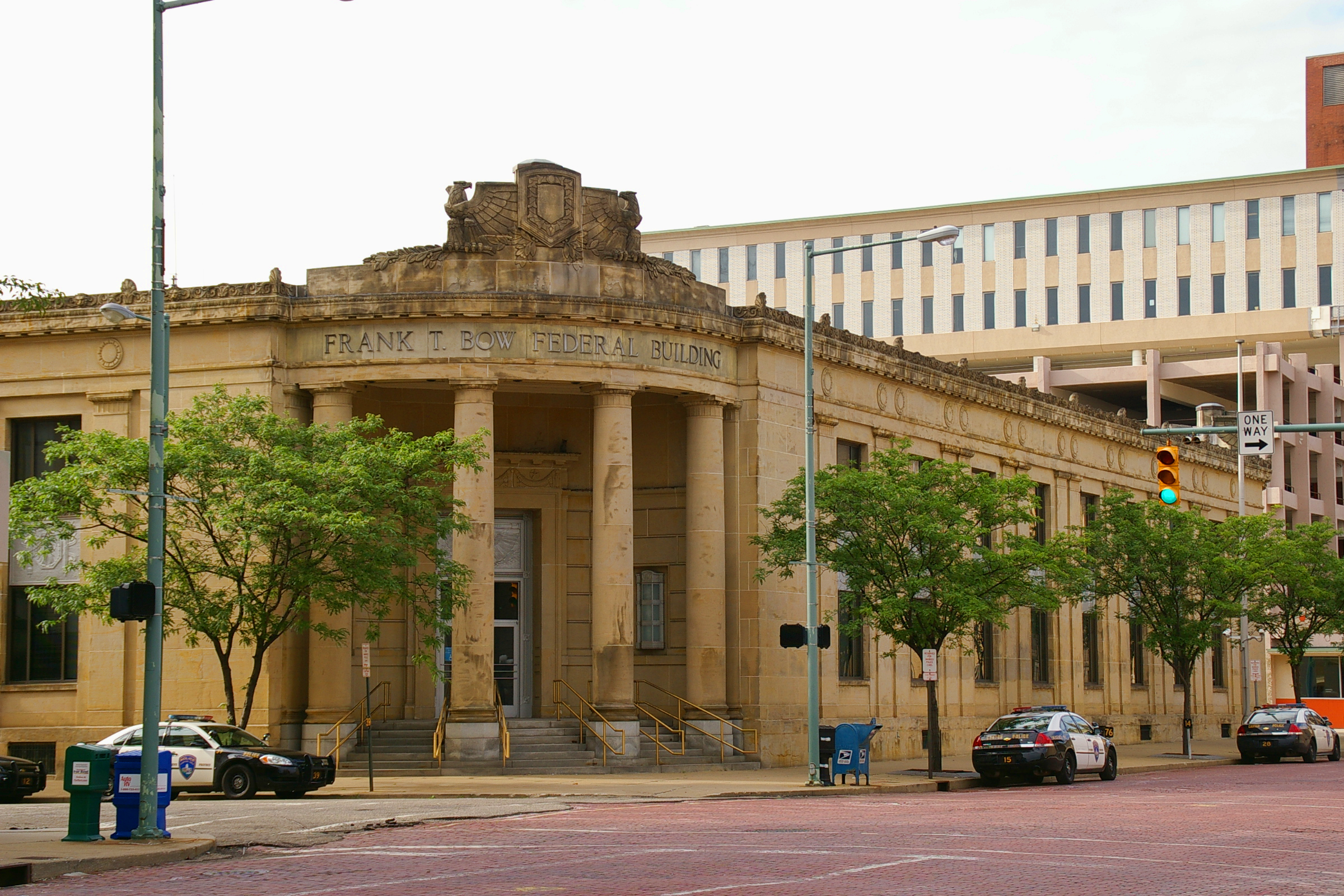
- Frank T. Bow Federal Building

- Location within Ohio Location within the United States
- Location: Market Ave, between Sixth St N and 2nd St S, E to W variable Boundary, Canton, Ohio
- Coordinates: 40°48′18″N 81°22′33″W
- Architectural style: Late Victorian, 19th and 20th Century Revivals
- NRHP reference No.: 06000202
- Added to NRHP: June 7, 2006

The Upper Downtown Canton Historic District, located in Canton, Ohio, was added to the National Register of Historic Places in 2006. The district encompasses the northern area of downtown Canton.

The district is significant because of its central position in the growing commerce of Canton during the 19th and early 20th centuries as well as for its examples of Classic Revival architecture and engineering.
