= Canton Main Street Historic District =

Historic district in North Carolina, United States

- U.S. National Register of Historic Places
- U.S. Historic district
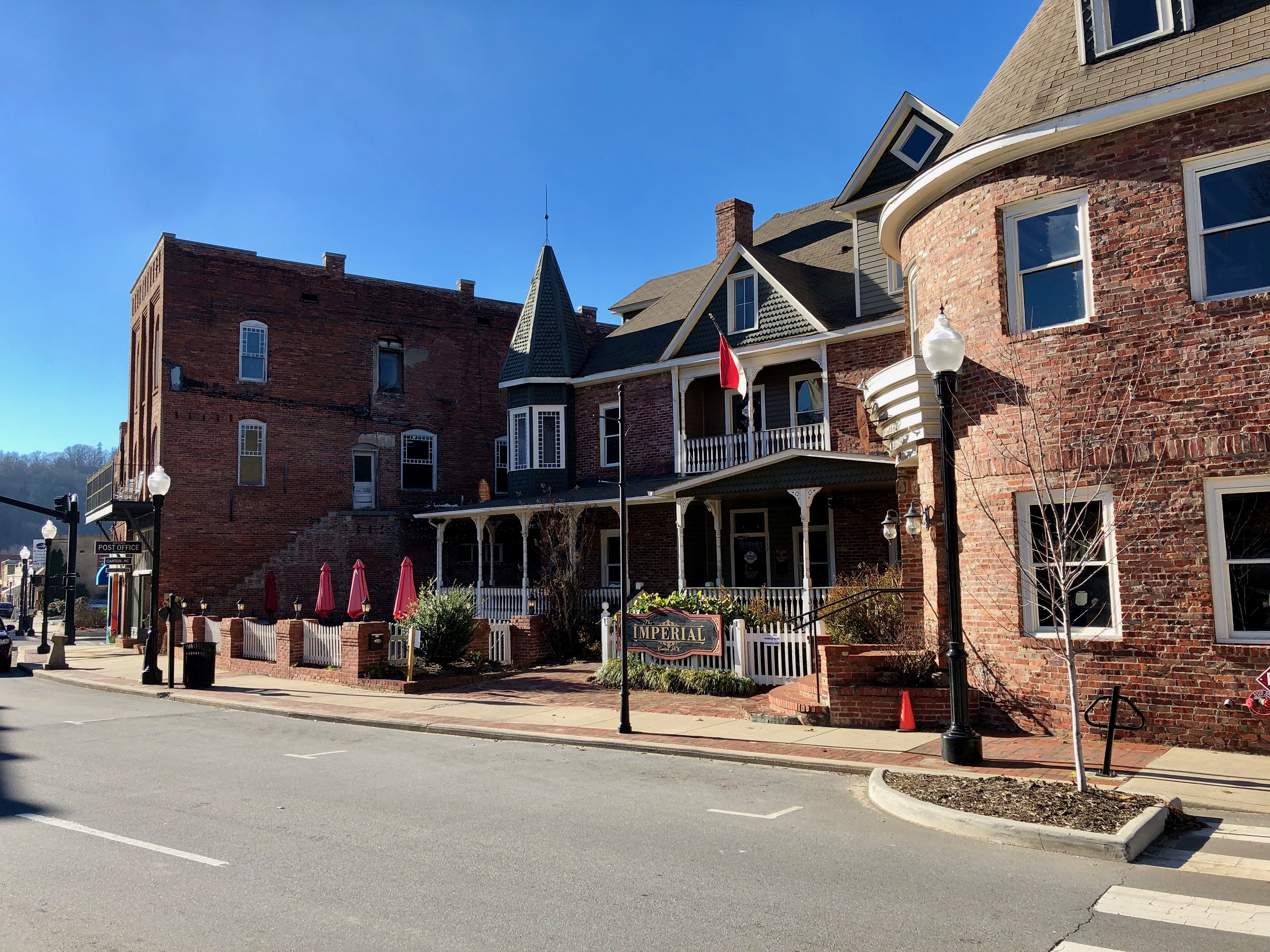
- The Imperial Hotel, A Contributing Structure

- Location within North Carolina Location within the United States
- Location: Bounded roughly by Park St., Main St., Bridge St., and Adams St., Canton, North Carolina
- Coordinates: 35°31′59″N 82°50′19″W
- Area: 14 acres (5.7 ha)
- Built: 1908
- Architect: Benton & Benton; et al.
- Architectural style: Early Commercial, Late 19th and 20th Century Revivals
- NRHP reference No.: 05000958
- Added to NRHP: September 7, 2005

The Canton Main Street Historic District is a national historic district located at Canton, Haywood County, North Carolina. It includes 34 contributing buildings and one other contributing structure and includes architecture by Benton & Benton. It includes Early Commercial architecture and Late 19th and 20th Century Revivals architecture. Located in the district is the separately listed Colonial Theater. Other notable buildings include the P L & S Building (1932), Champion Fibre Company Office Building (1918), Champion Bank and Trust (c. 1925), Imperial Hotel (c. 1885; additions 1916 and 1925), and the former United States Post Office (1939).

It was listed on the National Register of Historic Places in 2005.
