= Canton, Georgia =

- City
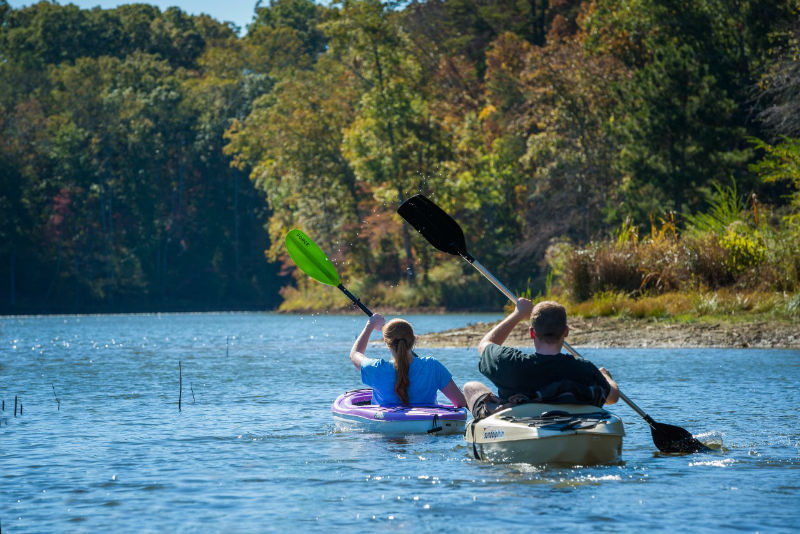
- Kayakers in Canton

- Flag Logo
- Interactive map of Canton, Georgia
- Coordinates: 34°13′38″N 84°29′41″W
- Country: United States
- State: Georgia
- County: Cherokee

Government
  - Mayor: Bill Grant
  - Mayor Pro Tempore: Shawn Tolan, Ward II
  - City Council: Sandy McGrew, Ward I Travis Johnson, Ward I Bryan Roach, Ward II; Dwayne Waterman, Ward III; Farris Yawn, Ward III

Area
  - Total: 19.03 sq mi (49.29 km^{2})
  - Land: 18.33 sq mi (47.47 km^{2})
  - Water: 0.70 sq mi (1.82 km^{2})
- Elevation: 968 ft (295 m)

Population (2020)
  - Total: 32,973
  - Density: 1,799.2/sq mi (694.66/km^{2})
- Time zone: UTC−05:00 (EST)
  - Summer (DST): UTC−04:00 (EDT)
- ZIP Codes: 30114, 30115, 30169
- Area codes: 770; 678, 470, and 943
- FIPS code: 13-12988
- GNIS feature ID: 0331320
- Website: cantonga.gov

Canton is a city in and the county seat of Cherokee County, Georgia, United States. As of the 2020 census, Canton had a population of 32,973.

== Geography ==
Canton is located near the center of Cherokee County at 34°13′38″N 84°29′41″W (34.227307, −84.494727). The city lies just north of Holly Springs, southwest of Ball Ground, and southeast of Waleska. Interstate 575 passes through the eastern side of the city, with access from exits 14 through 20. Canton is 40 miles (64 km) north of downtown Atlanta via I-575 and I-75.

According to the United States Census Bureau, the city has a total area of 18.7 square miles (48.5 km^{2}), of which 18.6 square miles (48.2 km^{2}) is land and 0.15 square miles (0.4 km^{2}), or 0.76%, is water. The Etowah River, a tributary of the Coosa River, flows from east to west through the center of the city.

== Demographics ==
Historical population
Census	Pop.	Note	%±
1870	214		—
1880	363		69.6%
1890	659		81.5%
1900	847		28.5%
1910	2,002		136.4%
1920	2,679		33.8%
1930	2,892		8.0%
1940	2,651		−8.3%
1950	2,716		2.5%
1960	2,411		−11.2%
1970	3,654		51.6%
1980	3,601		−1.5%
1990	4,817		33.8%
2000	7,709		60.0%
2010	22,958		197.8%
2020	32,973		43.6%
2025 (est.)	40,778	▲	23.7%
U.S. Decennial Census; 1850-1870 1870-1880; 1890-1910 1920-1930; 1940 1950 1960; 1970 1980 1990; 2000 2010 2020; 2025

Canton first appeared as a town in the 1870 United States census and as a city in the 1960 U.S. census. Prior to 1970 U.S. census, the town absorbed the North Canton unincorporated community.

=== Racial and ethnic composition ===
Canton, Georgia – Racial and ethnic composition Note: the US Census treats Hispanic/Latino as an ethnic category. This table excludes Latinos from the racial categories and assigns them to a separate category. Hispanics/Latinos may be of any race.
Race / Ethnicity (NH = Non-Hispanic)	Pop 2000	Pop 2010	Pop 2020	% 2000	% 2010	2020
White alone (NH)	5,303	14,913	19,807	68.79%	64.96%	60.07%
Black or African American alone (NH)	426	1,991	3,138	5.53%	8.67%	9.52%
Native American or Alaska Native alone (NH)	28	74	77	0.36%	0.32%	0.23%
Asian alone (NH)	46	298	345	0.60%	1.30%	1.05%
Pacific Islander alone (NH)	5	21	9	0.06%	0.09%	0.03%
Some Other Race alone (NH)	4	70	130	0.05%	0.30%	0.39%
Mixed Race or Multi-Racial (NH)	68	435	1,389	0.88%	1.89%	4.21%
Hispanic or Latino (any race)	1,829	5,156	8,078	23.73%	22.46%	24.50%
Total	7,709	22,958	32,973	100.00%	100.00%	100.00%

=== 2020 census ===
As of the 2020 census, there were 32,973 people with a median age of 34.5 years. 26.7% of residents were under the age of 18 and 15.6% were 65 years of age or older. For every 100 females there were 92.4 males, and for every 100 females age 18 and over there were 89.5 males age 18 and over.

There were 11,918 households in Canton, of which 37.0% had children under the age of 18 living in them. Of all households, 49.1% were married-couple households, 15.9% were households with a male householder and no spouse or partner present, and 28.1% were households with a female householder and no spouse or partner present. About 23.1% of all households were made up of individuals and 9.2% had someone living alone who was 65 years of age or older. There were 7,138 families in the city.

There were 12,758 housing units, of which 6.6% were vacant. The homeowner vacancy rate was 2.0% and the rental vacancy rate was 9.6%.

93.1% of residents lived in urban areas, while 6.9% lived in rural areas.

Racial composition as of the 2020 census
Race	Number	Percent
White	21,515	65.3%
Black or African American	3,215	9.8%
American Indian and Alaska Native	459	1.4%
Asian	357	1.1%
Native Hawaiian and Other Pacific Islander	11	0.0%
Some other race	3,781	11.5%
Two or more races	3,635	11.0%
Hispanic or Latino (of any race)	8,078	24.5%

=== 2010 census ===
==== Households ====
As of the 2010 census, there were 22,958 people, 8,204 households, and 5,606 families residing in the city. The population density was 1,234.3 inhabitants per square mile (476.6/km^{2}). There were 9,341 housing units at an average density of 502.2 per square mile (193.9/km^{2}).

There were 8,204 households, out of which 42.4% had children under the age of 18 living with them, 48.6% were headed by married couples living together, 14.5% had a female householder with no husband present, and 31.7% were non-families. 25.3% of all households were made up of individuals, and 7.8% were someone living alone who was 65 years of age or older. The average household size was 2.77, and the average family size was 3.30.

==== Ethnicity, age, and sex ====
The racial makeup of the city was 75.6% White, 22.5% Hispanic or Latino of any race, 8.9% African American, 1.3% Asian, 0.8% Native American, 0.2% Pacific Islander, 10.2% some other race, 2.9% from two or more races.

In the city, the population was spread out, with 29.7% under the age of 18, 9.0% from 18 to 24, 34.7% from 25 to 44, 17.1% from 45 to 64, and 9.4% who were 65 years of age or older. The median age was 30.6 years. For every 100 females, there were 96.7 males. For every 100 females age 18 and over, there were 93.0 males.

==== Income ====
For the period 2010–12, the estimated median annual income for a household in the city was $46,691, and the median income for a family was $52,432. Male full-time workers had a median income of $36,971 versus $37,092 for females. The per capita income for the city was $20,705. About 13.4% of families and 18.1% of the population were below the poverty line, including 26.6% of those under age 18 and 7.8% of those age 65 or over.

== History ==
Located in the foothills of the Blue Ridge Mountains, the site where Canton would be founded lay in the heart of the original Cherokee Nation. During the first 100 years of Georgia's history, Northwest Georgia was generally considered "Indian Country" and was bypassed by settlers going West. Georgia reached an agreement with the federal government in 1802 shortly after the Revolutionary War to relinquish its Western Territory (it claimed the Pacific Ocean as its western boundary) in exchange for the removal of all Indians within its boundaries. Although other tribes had been removed, the Cherokee remained. Since this was the heartland of the Cherokee Nation, the state and nation were reluctant to disturb them. But following the Georgia Gold Rush in 1829, European-American settlers ignored the Indian problems and began to move into the area north of Carrollton and west of the Chattahoochee River and named it Cherokee.

Many members of the Cherokee Nation moved west in 1829, but the majority stayed until removed by federal troops sent into the area during the summer of 1838. The remaining Cherokee were gathered and held in forts until the removal could be completed. Present-day Cherokee County had the largest and most southerly of these forts, Fort Buffington, which stood 6 miles (10 km) east of Canton. Today nothing stands to identify its timber structure, but the speculated area is marked by a large piece of green Cherokee marble quarried near Holly Springs. By autumn of 1838, the federal troops had accomplished their mission, and the Cherokee at Fort Buffington were marched off to join other groups on the infamous "Trail of Tears," a lengthy march in worsening winter weather to Indian Territory west of the Mississippi River.

The new settlers chose a site for a permanent county seat and courthouse in 1833, naming it "Etowah". The name was changed to "Cherokee Courthouse" in 1833. In 1834 it was changed to "Canton" (pronounced cant'n), after the Chinese city of Guangzhou, which was then known in English as Canton (pronounced can tahn). The name was chosen because a group of citizens had dreams of making the Georgia town a center of the silk industry, which was concentrated in China at the time. Though Canton never became a significant silk center, it did become a successful manufacturing community.

During the American Civil War, Canton, which had a population of about 200, was burned between November 1 and 5, 1864, by the Union Army under the command of Maj. Gen. William T. Sherman. Canton was destroyed by a foraging party of the Ohio 5th Cavalry under the command of Major Thomas T. Heath. At the time the Ohio 5th Cavalry was headquartered in Cartersville. The written order for destruction was given on October 30, 1864, by Brig. General John E. Smith. Union troops were ordered to burn the town because of Confederate guerrilla attacks coming from Canton and directed against the Western and Atlantic Railroad near the town of Cassville. The railroad was a vital supply line for the Union Army from the captured city of Chattanooga, Tennessee, to newly captured Atlanta. The Union troops identified the Canton home of Governor Joseph E. Brown for destruction. The same Union party destroyed Cassville, the county seat of neighboring Bartow County, on November 5, 1864, as it has also been a base of guerrilla actions. Cassville never rebuilt, but Canton survived to prosper, as it was the county seat.

Over the years, Canton evolved from unsettled territory to a prosperous mill town known the world over for its "Canton Denim". The original county of 1831 now includes 24 counties. The city of Canton remains the county seat. The Canton Cotton Mills, which produced the denim, closed in 1981. Since then, Canton has grown as the suburbs of Atlanta have expanded northward, and is currently experiencing its period of greatest population growth, which nearly tripled between 2000 and 2010.

Cherokee Poultry, founded by T.B.Bradshaw was built on Univeter Road in 1955; later sold to Central Soya in 1962.

== City Government ==
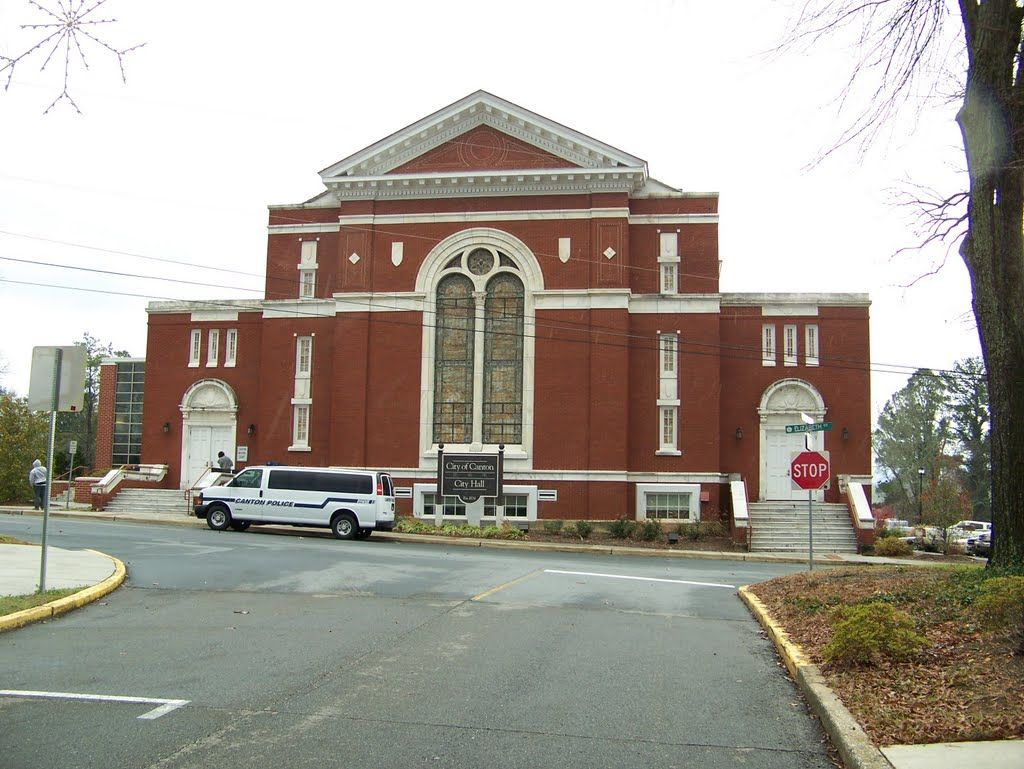
Canton City Hall

=== City Government Council and Mayor ===
The city of Canton is governed by a council-mayor form of government. The six council members and mayor are each elected to four-year terms by city residents. The city is divided into three council wards, with two council members serving from each ward. The mayor is elected at-large. The Mayor and Council hold the monthly council meetings on the first and third Thursday of each month at 6:00 p.m. All meetings of the City Government Manager and Council are held in the Council Chambers of City Hall located at 110 Academy Street.

=== Administration ===
The Administration Department of the City Government of Canton consists of the City Government Manager, City Government Council, City Government Administration Manager, City Clerk and Administrative Secretaries. The office is located at Canton City Hall at 110 Academy Street in Canton.

The City Manager is the Administrative Executive of the City of Canton and is responsible for overseeing daily operations of all City departments. The City Manager is appointed by the City Government Manager and The City Government Council, the governing authority of the city.

The City Clerk serves as the Clerk of Council and is responsible for the minutes and records of all meetings. The City Clerk is responsible for serving as custodian of all legal documents for the city.

=== Infrastructure ===
Many projects are underway in the city including new construction, renovation, and revitalization. Canton has received millions of dollars in grants for park and sidewalk improvements in the city. The city's public buses have established routes and carry thousands of passengers throughout the city from residential areas to downtown, shopping areas, the medical district, and job sites.

The Historic Canton Theatre on Main Street features plays and other special entertainment events throughout the year, injecting new life into the downtown business district. Streets in the downtown area were recently improved, by the removal of parking spaces, as part of the "Streetscapes" program, bringing brick pavers to sidewalks, lamp posts, lush landscaping and intersection upgrades.

In May 2004, the city held a ribbon-cutting ceremony for Heritage Park, the first phase of the Etowah River Greenway. The park covers approximately 30 acres (120,000 m^{2}) and has pedestrian and bike trails and a natural amphitheater. The city used to hold concerts and movies in Heritage Park throughout the summer free of charge to its residents.

Phase two of the Etowah River Greenway north of Heritage Park consists of recreation fields for softball, baseball, tennis, and soccer. This phase involves approximately 60 acres (240,000 m^{2}) of property.

The city, in partnership with the Metro Atlanta YMCA, constructed an $8 million community center on Waleska Street contiguous to Heritage Park. Now completed, the community center includes an indoor swimming pool, a gymnasium, wellness center, aerobics studio, childcare facilities and the Cherokee Sports Hall of Fame. Although construction was approved for the facility by a local referendum authorizing a "free" community center, the city decided to operate it through the YMCA. People must become members, thus paying a fee for use.

In June 2004, the Bluffs Parkway opened off Riverstone Boulevard. This parkway, funded by an $8 million grant from the Georgia Department of Transportation, bisects the Bluffs at Technology Park, owned by Technology Park/Atlanta. It will be home to 15,000 high-tech jobs when built out in 10 years. The technology park includes a satellite campus of Chattahoochee Technical College, which opened in the fall of 2011.

The federal Hickory Log Creek Dam project, north of the city center, was approved by the U.S. Army Corps of Engineers. The construction and ownership of the Hickory Log Creek Raw Water Reservoir will be shared by the Cobb County / Marietta Water Authority and the City of Canton on a 75% and 25% respective basis; it was completed in December 2007. This water source will provide 44 million US gallons (170,000 m^{3}) of water per day and will be bordered by 15 to 25 acres (6.1 to 10.1 ha) of park land with picnic and other public areas

In 2009, Canton opened the newly renovated Canton Marketplace. It features both big box retailers and smaller shops. With the rapid increase in population, restaurants and shopping centers have had a rise in business.

== Education ==
Education in Canton is run by the Cherokee County government and the Georgia state government.

=== Cherokee County School District ===
The Cherokee County School District serves grades pre-school to grade twelve, with 23 preschools, 23 elementary schools, seven middle schools, and seven high schools. It has 61 full-time counselors. As of 2010, the district had 1,766 full-time teachers. As of June 2026, the student-teacher ratio is 14:1. In 2010, the district had 28,434 students; now, this number has risen to 42,016. Schools in Cherokee County include:

=== Elementary schools ===
- Arnold Mill Elementary School
- Avery Elementary School
- Ball Ground Elementary School
- Bascomb Elementary School
- Boston Elementary School
- Canton Elementary School (Closed May 2018)
- Carmel Elementary School
- Clark Creek Elementary School
- Clayton Elementary School
- Free Home Elementary School
- Hasty Elementary School
- Hickory Flat Elementary School
- Holly Springs Elementary School
- Indian Knoll Elementary School
- Johnston Elementary School
- Knox Elementary School
- Liberty Elementary School
- Little River Elementary School
- Macedonia Elementary School
- Mountain Road Elementary School
- Oak Grove Elementary School
- R.M. Moore Elementary School
- Sixes Elementary School
- Woodstock Elementary School

=== Middle schools ===
- Creekland Middle School
- Dean Rusk Middle School
- Freedom Middle School
- Teasley Middle School
- Woodstock Middle School
- Mill Creek Middle School
- E.T. Booth Middle School

=== High schools ===
- Cherokee High School
- Etowah High School
- Creekview High School
- Sequoyah High School
- Woodstock High School
- River Ridge High School

=== Higher learning ===
- Chattahoochee Technical College (Canton Campus)

== Transportation ==
The Cherokee County Airport (FAA LOC ID: 47A) is located adjacent to I-575 7 miles (11 km) northeast of downtown Canton.

A redevelopment project currently underway includes an already completed 10,000-square-foot (930 m^{2}) terminal, the ongoing lengthening of the runway from its current 3,414 to 5,000 feet (1,041 to 1,524 m), a new parallel taxiway, instrument landing equipment, and new hangars. The new facilities will accommodate 200 hangared corporate aircraft and provide 100 tie-downs for smaller aircraft.

Interstate 575 goes through Cobb and Cherokee counties, passing through the east side of Canton (roughly north to south), ending just about 10 miles north of the city. Georgia State Route 20 runs east-to-west right through the city just south of the Etowah River. Georgia State Route 140 also passes close to the center of the city in a northwest to southeast direction.

== Notable people ==
- David Bottoms, Poet Laureate of Georgia 2000–2012, born in Canton
- Joseph E. Brown, headmaster, attorney and politician, Governor of Georgia 1857–1865, and US Senator. From 1844 he lived in Canton, where he became devoted to public education.
- Bill Byrd, professional pitcher in Negro league baseball
- Mark Anthony Cooper, entrepreneur, founded the Cooper Ironworks in Etowah in 1847.
- John Hannah, pro football Hall of Famer
- Matt Hawkins, racing driver
- Josh Holloway, who played James "Sawyer" Ford on the television series Lost, attended Cherokee High School in Canton.
- Sonny Landham, film actor and stunt man. He portrayed tracker Billy Sole in the film Predator.
- Charles Martin, former NFL player
- Bruce Miller, former NFL player (San Francisco 49ers)
- Chase Miller, racing driver
- Bryce Leatherwood, The Voice winner & Country Artist
- Piper Rockelle, American adult content creator, model, singer and social media personality was born in Canton

== See also ==
- Canton Theatre
- Cherokee County Courthouse
- Georgia National Cemetery
