= Harris House =

Harris House may refer to:

== Australia ==
- Harris House, Toowoomba, listed on the Queensland Heritage Register

== United States ==
=== Arkansas ===
- Harris House (Hensley, Arkansas)
- Harris House (Little Rock, Arkansas)

=== California ===
- Harris House (Glendale, California), listed on the Glendale Register of Historic Resources in Glendale, California

=== Colorado ===
- W.C. Harris House, Sterling, listed on the NRHP in Logan County, Colorado

=== Connecticut ===
- Smith-Harris House (East Lyme, Connecticut), also known, as Thomas Avery House
- Jonathan Newton Harris House, New London

=== Florida ===
- Comstock-Harris House, Winter Park

=== Georgia ===
- Joel Chandler Harris House, Atlanta
- Harris-Pearson-Walker House, Augusta, listed on the NRHP in Richmond County, Georgia
- William Harris Homestead, Campton, Walton County, also known as William Harris Family Farmstead
- Harris-Murrow-Trowell House, Oliver
- Corra White Harris House, Study, and Chapel, Rydal
- Smith-Harris House (Vesta, Georgia), listed on the NRHP in Oglethorpe County, Georgia

=== Indiana ===
- West-Harris House, Fishers
- Bright B. Harris House, Greensburg

=== Iowa ===
- Dr. Percy and Lileah Harris House, Cedar Rapids

=== Kansas ===
- Harris-Borman House, Emporia
- Harris House (Garnett, Kansas), a Kansas museum
- Senator William A. Harris House, Linwood, listed on the NRHP in Leavenworth County, Kansas

=== Kentucky ===
- A.T. Harris House, Versailles, listed on the NRHP in Woodford County, Kentucky

=== Maine ===
- Nathan Harris House, Westbrook

=== Maryland ===
- Nathan and Susannah Harris House, Harrisville

=== Massachusetts ===
- John Harris House and Farm, Boston and Brookline
- Harris-Merrick House, Worcester
- Joseph Harris House, Stambaugh, Michigan, NRHP-listed

=== Mississippi ===
- Harris-Banks House, Columbus

=== Missouri ===
- Col. John Harris House, Kansas City, listed on the NRHP in Jackson County, Missouri
- Capt. Thomas C. Harris House, Kirksville
- Harris-Chilton-Ruble House, New Franklin
- Harris House (Sedalia, Missouri)

=== Montana ===
- Harris House (Bozeman, Montana), listed on the NRHP in Gallatin County, Montana

=== Nebraska ===
- Harris House (Lincoln, Nebraska)

=== New Jersey ===
- Van Der Veer-Harris House, Woods Tavern, listed on the NRHP in Somerset County, New Jersey

=== North Carolina ===
- Spencer Harris House, Falkland
- Dr. J. H. Harris House, Franklinton
- Cabe-Pratt-Harris House, Hillsborough
- Marshall-Harris-Richardson House, Raleigh
- Harris-Currin House, Wilton

=== Ohio ===
- Stephen R. Harris House, Bucyrus, listed on the NRHP in Crawford County, Ohio
- Franklin Harris Farmstead, Salem
- William B. Harris House, Zanesville

=== Oklahoma ===
- Harris House (Haworth, Oklahoma), listed on the NRHP in McCurtain County, Oklahoma

=== Pennsylvania ===
- John Harris Mansion, Harrisburg

=== Rhode Island ===
- Elliot-Harris-Miner House, Lincoln

=== South Dakota ===
- Fred S. Harris House, Belle Fourche, listed on the NRHP in Butte County, South Dakota

=== Tennessee ===
- V.R. Harris House, Erin
- Harris-Holden House, Howell
- Capt. Harris House, Memphis, listed on the NRHP in Shelby County, Tennessee
- Robert C. Harris House, South Berlin, listed on the NRHP in Marshall County, Tennessee

=== Texas ===
- Capt. Andrew Jackson Harris House, Belton, listed on the NRHP in Bell County, Texas
- E. M. Harris House, Georgetown, listed on the NRHP in Williamson County, Texas
- Beverly-Harris House, McKinney, listed on the NRHP in Collin County, Texas
- Ethel Wilson Harris House, San Antonio
- Goforth-Harris House, San Marcos, listed on the NRHP in Hays County, Texas

=== Utah ===
- Louis W. Harris House, Beaver
- Sarah Eliza Harris House, Beaver
- Thomas and Caroline Harris House, Centerville, listed on the NRHP in Davis County, Utah
- Harris-Tingey House, Centerville
- Martin Harris Gravesite, Clarkston
- Joseph D. Harris House, Park City, listed on the NRHP in Summit County, Utah
- William H. Harris House, Park City, listed on the NRHP in Summit County, Utah

=== Vermont ===
- William Harris House (Brattleboro, Vermont)

=== Virginia ===
- Harris-Poindexter House and Store, Mineral

=== Wisconsin ===
- Harris House (Barneveld, Wisconsin)
- Abner L. Harris House, Reedsburg

== See also ==
- William Harris House (disambiguation)
- Harris Building (disambiguation)
- Harry's House (disambiguation)
- Smith-Harris House (disambiguation)
