= Harris Farm =

Harris Farm may refer to:

- William Harris Family Farmstead, Campton, Georgia, listed on the NRHP in Walton County, Georgia
- Harris Farm (Walkersville, Maryland), listed on the NRHP in Maryland
- John Harris House and Farm, in Boston and/or Brookline, MA, listed on the NRHP in Massachusetts
- Harris Farm (Marblehead, Massachusetts), listed on the NRHP in Massachusetts
- Rascoe-Harris Farm, Liberty, Tennessee, listed on the NRHP in Sumner County, Tennessee
- Harris Farm (Albemarle County, Virginia), added to the NRHP in 2015
- Harris Farm Markets, an Australian food retail store chain

== See also ==
- Harris House (disambiguation)
- Harris Building (disambiguation)
