= William Harris House =

William Harris House may refer to:

in the United States (by state)

- William Harris Homestead, Campton, Walton County, Georgia, also known and NRHP-listed as William Harris Family Farmstead
- Senator William A. Harris House, Linwood, Kansas, listed on the NRHP in Leavenworth County, Kansas
- William B. Harris House, Zanesville, Ohio, NRHP-listed
- William H. Harris House, Park City, Utah, listed on the NRHP in Summit County, Utah
- William Harris House (Brattleboro, Vermont), listed on the NRHP in Windham County, Vermont

== See also ==
- Harris House (disambiguation)
