= Harry's House (disambiguation) =

Harry's House is a 2022 studio album by Harry Styles.

Harry's House may also refer to:

- "Harry's House / Centerpiece", a song by Joni Mitchell from the 1975 album The Hissing of Summer Lawns
- Harry's House, a recording studio in Boulder, Colorado owned by Fast Speaking Music

== See also ==
- Harry House (1919–2006), Australian rules footballer
- Harris House (disambiguation)
