= Smith–Harris House =

Smith–Harris House may refer to:

- Smith–Harris House (Vesta, Georgia), listed on the NRHP in Oglethorpe County, Georgia
- Smith–Harris House (East Lyme, Connecticut), also known and NRHP-listed as the Thomas Avery House
