= Dupree–Moore Farm =

Historic farm in North Carolina, United States

- U.S. National Register of Historic Places
- Location within North Carolina Location within the United States
- Location: 3901 Buck Moore Rd., near Falkland, North Carolina
- Coordinates: 35°43′47″N 77°32′25″W
- Area: 185.85 acres (75.21 ha)
- Built: c. 1800-1825, c. 1848, c. 1861
- Architectural style: Greek Revival
- NRHP reference No.: 12000579
- Added to NRHP: August 28, 2012

Dupree–Moore Farm, also known as the Thomas Dupree House, is a historic home and tobacco farm located near Falkland, Pitt County, North Carolina. The house was built between about 1800 and 1825, as a 1 1/2-story, three-bay, frame dwelling. It was enlarged to two stories and rear additions added and remodeled in the Greek Revival style about 1848. A two-story rear "T" addition was added about 1861. The house features a one-story full-width shed-roof front porch with Picturesque-style latticework. Also on the property are the contributing smokehouse (c. 1910), tobacco grading house (c. 1910), pump house/utility shed (c. 1938), frame equipment shelter (c. 1955), mule barn (c. 1905), tobacco packhouse (c. 1910), tenant house (c. 1922), tenant tobacco packhouse (c. 1922), sweet potato house (c. 1910), log tobacco barn (c. 1942), tobacco barn (c. 1951), and tobacco packhouse (c. 1951).

It was added to the National Register of Historic Places in 2012.
