= Falkland Historic District =

Historic district in North Carolina, United States

- U.S. National Register of Historic Places
- U.S. Historic district
- Location within North Carolina Location within the United States
- Location: Roughly Crisp, N. Main, & S. Main Sts., & West Ave., Falkland, North Carolina
- Coordinates: 35°41′56″N 77°30′51″W
- Area: 35 acres (14 ha)
- Built: c. 1859
- Architectural style: Colonial Revival, Greek Revival, Victorian
- NRHP reference No.: 12000833
- Added to NRHP: October 3, 2012

Falkland Historic District is a national historic district located at Falkland, Pitt County, North Carolina. The district encompasses 35 contributing buildings, 1 contributing site, and 1 contributing structure in the town of Falkland. It includes buildings dated from about 1859 to 1960 and notable examples of Colonial Revival, Greek Revival, and Victorian style architecture. Notable buildings include the Dr. Peyton Hopkins Mayo House (c. 1859), Dr. Jenness Morrill House (c. 1900), Sellars Mark Crisp House (c. 1905), David Morrill House (c. 1948), Falkland Presbyterian Church (1923) and adjoining cemetery, former Fire Station (c. 1960), Kinchen Robert Wooten Store (1936-1937), and Pittman Building (1951).

It was listed on the National Register of Historic Places in 2012.
