= Falkland, North Carolina =

- Town
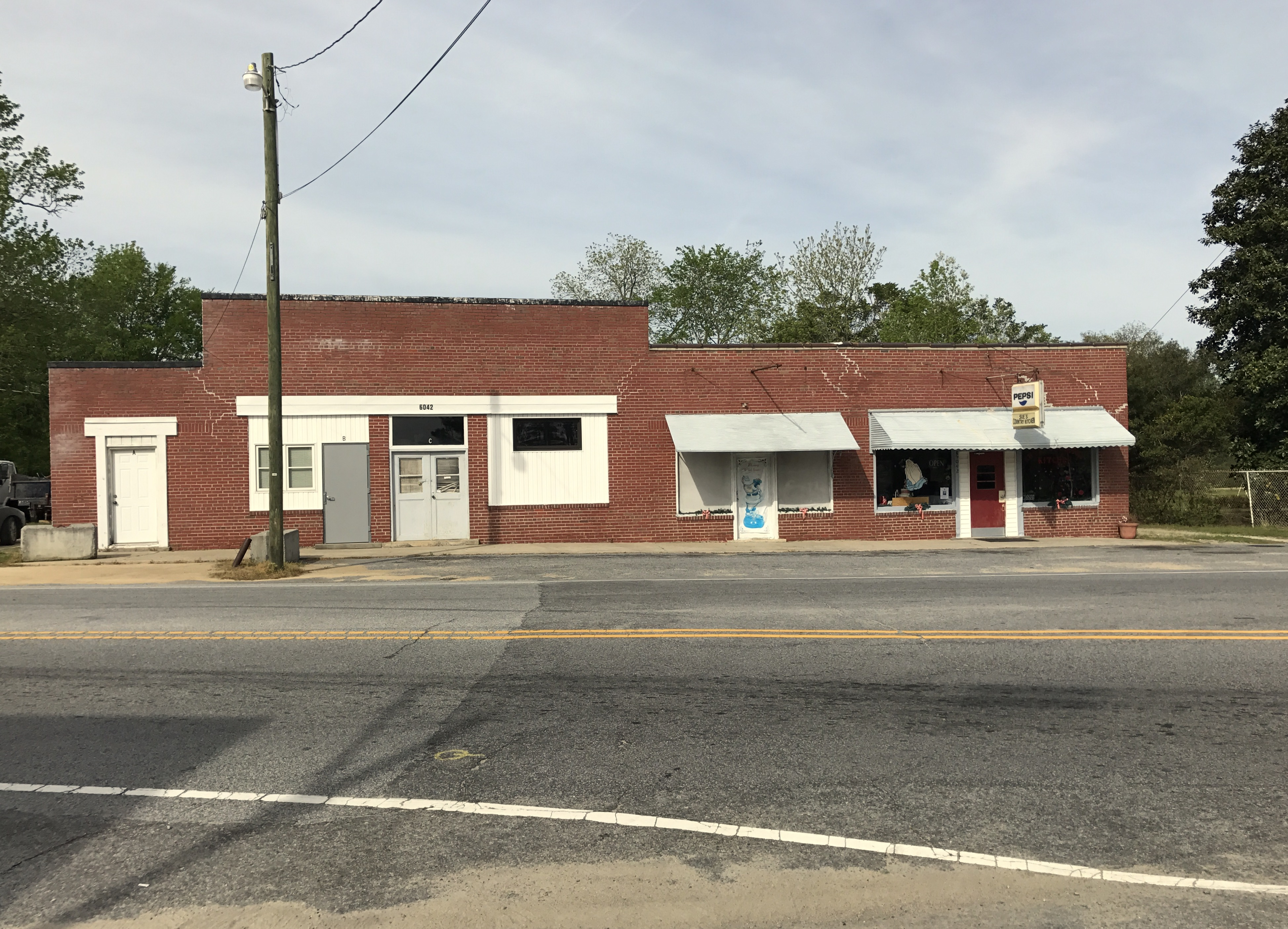

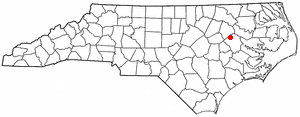
- Location of Falkland, North Carolina
- Coordinates: 35°41′55″N 77°30′46″W
- Country: United States
- State: North Carolina
- County: Pitt

Area
  - Total: 0.23 sq mi (0.59 km^{2})
  - Land: 0.23 sq mi (0.59 km^{2})
  - Water: 0 sq mi (0.00 km^{2})
- Elevation: 75 ft (23 m)

Population (2020)
  - Total: 47
  - Density: 206.4/sq mi (79.69/km^{2})
- Time zone: UTC-5 (Eastern (EST))
  - Summer (DST): UTC-4 (EDT)
- ZIP code: 27827
- Area code: 252
- FIPS code: 37-22640
- GNIS feature ID: 2406486

Falkland is a town in Pitt County, North Carolina, United States. The population was 47 at the 2020 census, making it the least populous town in Pitt County. The town is a part of the Greenville Metropolitan Area located in North Carolina's Inner Banks region.

== History ==
The Falkland Historic District, Spencer Harris House, and Dupree-Moore Farm are listed on the National Register of Historic Places.

== Geography ==
According to the United States Census Bureau, the town has a total area of 0.2 square miles (0.52 km^{2}), all land.

== Demographics ==
Historical population
Census	Pop.	Note	%±
1890	61		—
1900	139		127.9%
1910	132		−5.0%
1920	198		50.0%
1930	187		−5.6%
1940	188		0.5%
1950	174		−7.4%
1960	140		−19.5%
1970	130		−7.1%
1980	118		−9.2%
1990	108		−8.5%
2000	112		3.7%
2010	96		−14.3%
2020	47		−51.0%
U.S. Decennial Census

As of the census of 2000, there were 112 people, 39 households, and 26 families residing in the town. The population density was 453.7 inhabitants per square mile (175.2/km^{2}). There were 42 housing units at an average density of 170.2 per square mile (65.7/km^{2}). The racial makeup of the town was 68.75% White, 30.36% African American, 0.89% from other races. Hispanic or Latino of any race were 9.82% of the population.

There were 39 households, out of which 20.5% had children under the age of 18 living with them, 35.9% were married couples living together, 20.5% had a female householder with no husband present, and 30.8% were non-families. 25.6% of all households were made up of individuals, and 15.4% had someone living alone who was 65 years of age or older. The average household size was 2.87 and the average family size was 3.37.

In the town, the population was spread out, with 22.3% under the age of 18, 8.0% from 18 to 24, 37.5% from 25 to 44, 17.0% from 45 to 64, and 15.2% who were 65 years of age or older. The median age was 35 years. For every 100 females, there were 77.8 males. For every 100 females age 18 and over, there were 81.3 males.

The median income for a household in the town was $31,250, and the median income for a family was $43,750. Males had a median income of $30,000 versus $14,107 for females. The per capita income for the town was $11,997. There were 5.0% of families and 19.8% of the population living below the poverty line, including 21.4% of under eighteens and 35.7% of those over 64.
