= Harris-Tingey House =

- U.S. National Register of Historic Places
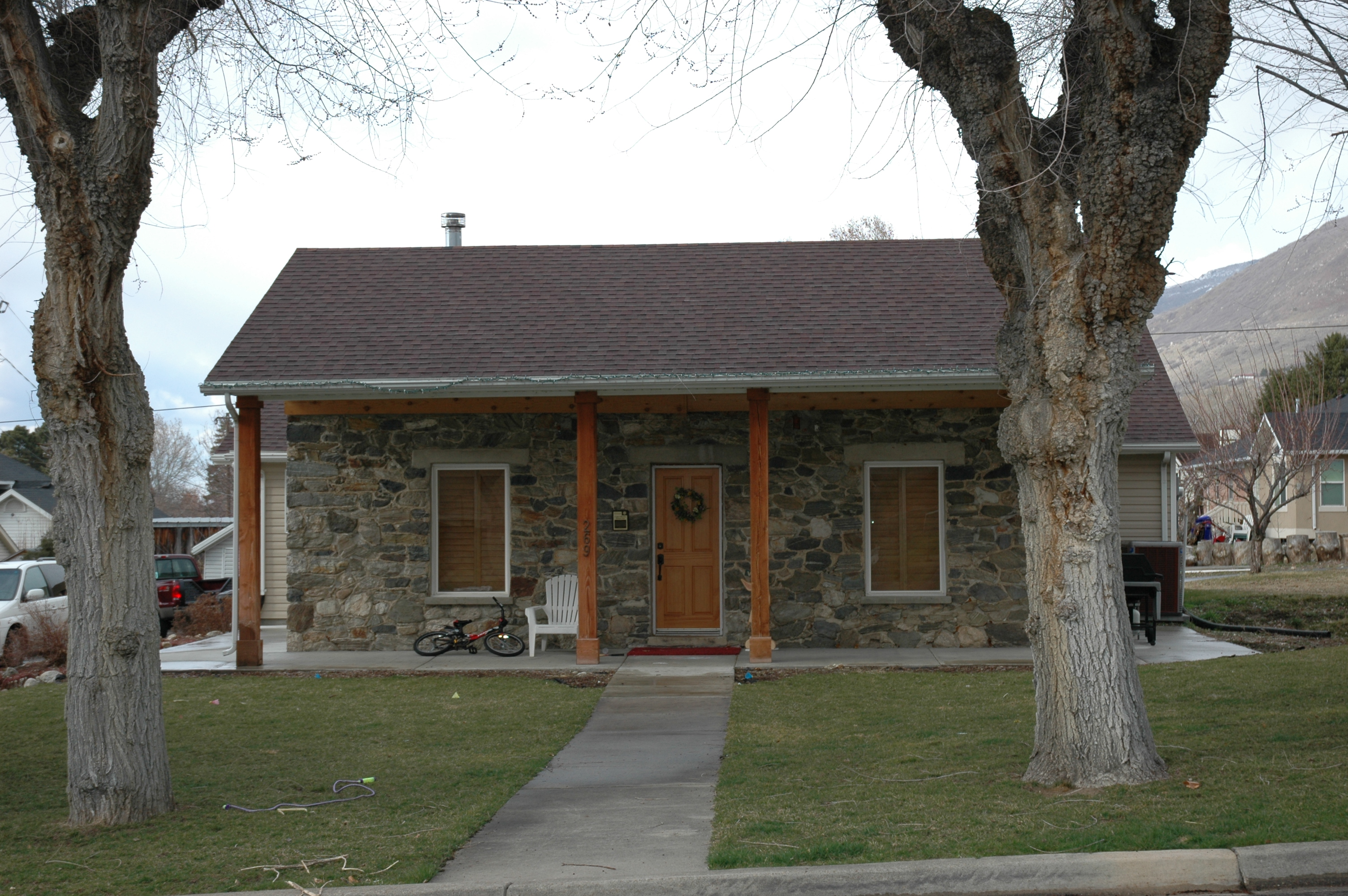

- Location within Utah Location within the United States
- Location: 269 E. Center St., Centerville, Utah
- Coordinates: 40°55′03″N 111°52′28″W
- Area: 0.6 acres (0.24 ha)
- Built: c.1869, c.1890
- Built by: Charles Duncan; John J. Harris
- Architectural style: Mid 19th Century Revival
- MPS: Centerville MPS
- NRHP reference No.: 97001314
- Added to NRHP: November 17, 1997

The Harris-Tingey House, at 269 E. Center St. in Centerville, Utah, was listed on the National Register of Historic Places in 1997.

Its original portion, built around 1869, is a one-story Classical stone house with gable end brick chimneys, with a hall-parlor plan. It was probably built by carpenter John J. Harris, perhaps with stonemason Charles Duncan. A brick addition to the rear was added around 1890.
