= Dr. Percy and Lileah Harris House =

Historic house in Iowa, United States

- U.S. National Register of Historic Places
- Location within Iowa Location within the United States
- Location: 3626 Bever Ave. SE; Cedar Rapids, Iowa
- Coordinates: 41°59′04″N 91°36′56″W
- Area: less than one acre
- Built: 1963
- MPS: Twentieth Century African American Civil Rights-related Resources in Iowa MPS
- NRHP reference No.: 100006115
- Added to NRHP: February 4, 2021

The Dr. Percy and Lileah Harris House is a historic building located in Cedar Rapids, Iowa, United States. It was listed on the National Register of Historic Places in 2021.

== History ==
Robert Armstrong, who owned Armstrong's Department Store, donated land next to his home to St. Paul's Methodist Church. He said the church could, in turn, sell the lot and put the money into its building fund. Dr. Percy and Lileah Harris had moved to Cedar Rapids in 1957 and were having a difficult time finding someone to sell them a lot to build a new home for their growing family. They were members of St. Paul's Church, and its only African American family, so Armstrong suggested that the church sell the property to the Harris'. The lot was in the affluent, and all-white neighborhood, of Indian Creek Hills. Opposition to the sale was led by Jack Hatt, a business partner of Armstrong, who lived across the street from the property. At a church meeting in 1961 to decide the issue, the Harris' race was never mentioned instead the fear of a loss of their property values was stated as the main issue. Others were concerned that the church had involved itself in the controversy. The church had a history of supporting social justice issues and, in the end, voted 460 to 291 to sell to the Harris'. The issue divided the congregation, however, and some of those who voted "No" left St. Paul's and founded Lovely Lane United Methodist.

The two-story house with an attached garage was completed in 1963. The Harris' raised their 12 children there, and as Armstrong predicted in the 1961 church meeting, the neighbors real estate values were not affected.

Dr. Harris was the first black physician in Cedar Rapids. He served as the Linn County medical examiner for 38 years, President of Medical Staff at St. Luke's Hospital, served on the board for several community organizations, president of the Cedar Rapids chapter of the NAACP, and two terms as a member of the Iowa Board of Regents. Lileah was a painter, poet, pianist, singer, active church member, and an advocate for life-long learning. She served on the Cedar Rapids Human Rights Commission. At age 62, she earned a degree in Russian from the University of Iowa. Lileah died in 2014 at the age of 83, and Percy died three years later at 89. They had been married for 63 years. The building that houses the Linn County Public Health and Child and Youth Development Services was dedicated in their memory in 2019.
