= Harris House (Little Rock, Arkansas) =

Historic house in Arkansas, United States

- U.S. National Register of Historic Places
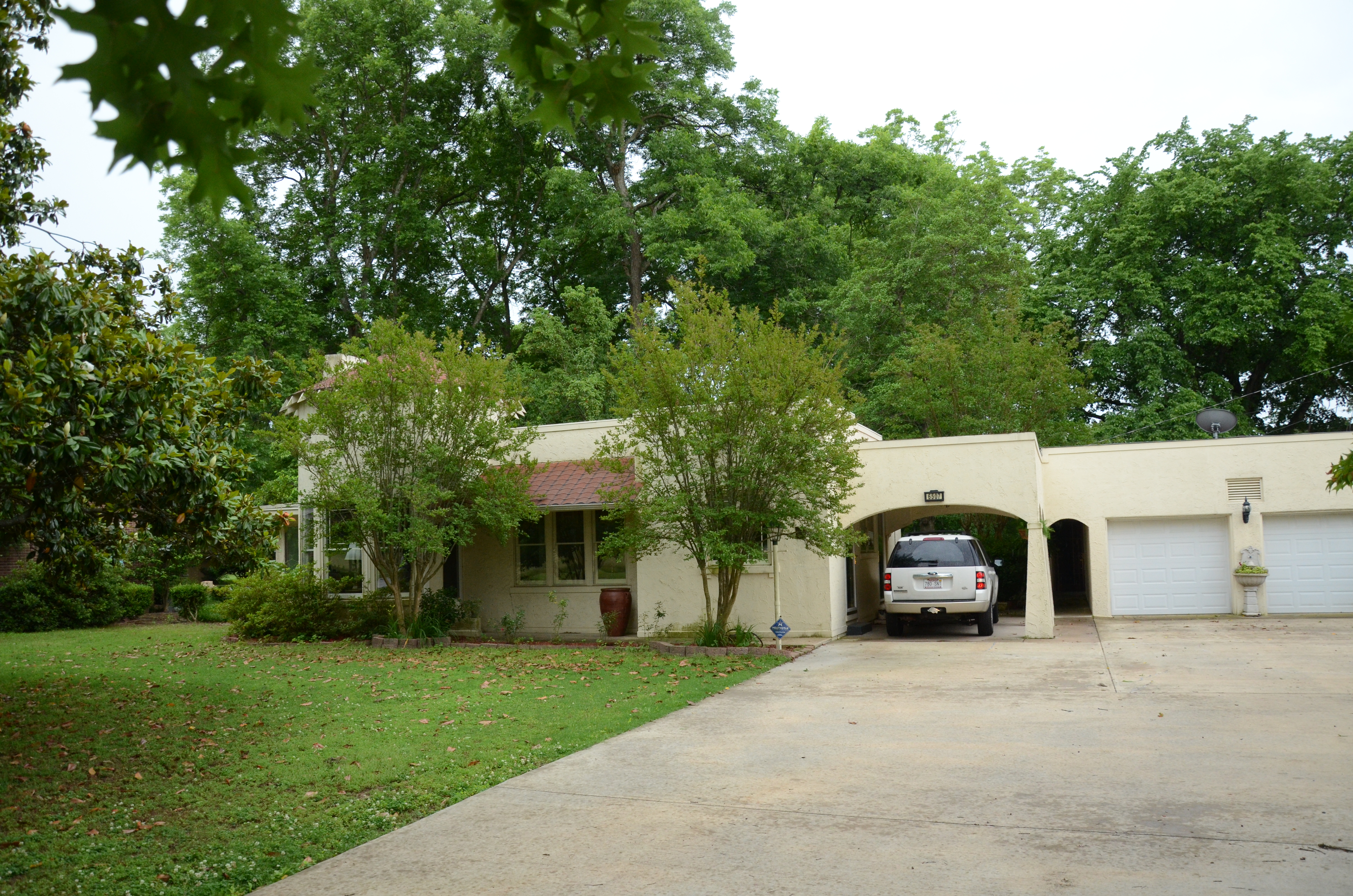

- Location within Arkansas Location within the United States
- Location: 6507 Fourche Dam Pike, Little Rock, Arkansas
- Coordinates: 34°43′16″N 92°11′52″W
- Area: less than one acre
- Built: 1924
- Built by: Porter Field Harris (plastering)
- Architect: Lester Flint
- Architectural style: Spanish eclectic
- NRHP reference No.: 98000644
- Added to NRHP: June 3, 1998

The Harris House is a historic house at 6507 Fourche Dam Pike in Little Rock, Arkansas. It is a single-story stuccoed structure, designed in an ecelctic interpretation of Spanish Revival architecture. Prominent features include a circular tower at one corner, a parapet obscuring its sloping flat roof, and a port-cochere with a segmented-arch opening supported by battered wooden columns. It was built in 1924 for Florence and Porter Field Harris, to their design and probably the work of Porter Harris, a master plasterer known for his work on the Arkansas State Capitol.

The house was listed on the National Register of Historic Places in 1998.

== See also ==
- National Register of Historic Places listings in Little Rock, Arkansas
