= Harris Building =

Harris Building may refer to:

in Australia

- Harris Building (Burnie), Tasmania

in the United States

- Harris Building (Dayton, Oregon), listed on the NRHP in Yamhill County, Oregon
- Harris Building (Philadelphia, Pennsylvania), NRHP-listed

== See also ==
- Harris House (disambiguation)
- Harrison Building (disambiguation)
