= Harris Farm (Marblehead, Massachusetts) =

- U.S. National Register of Historic Places
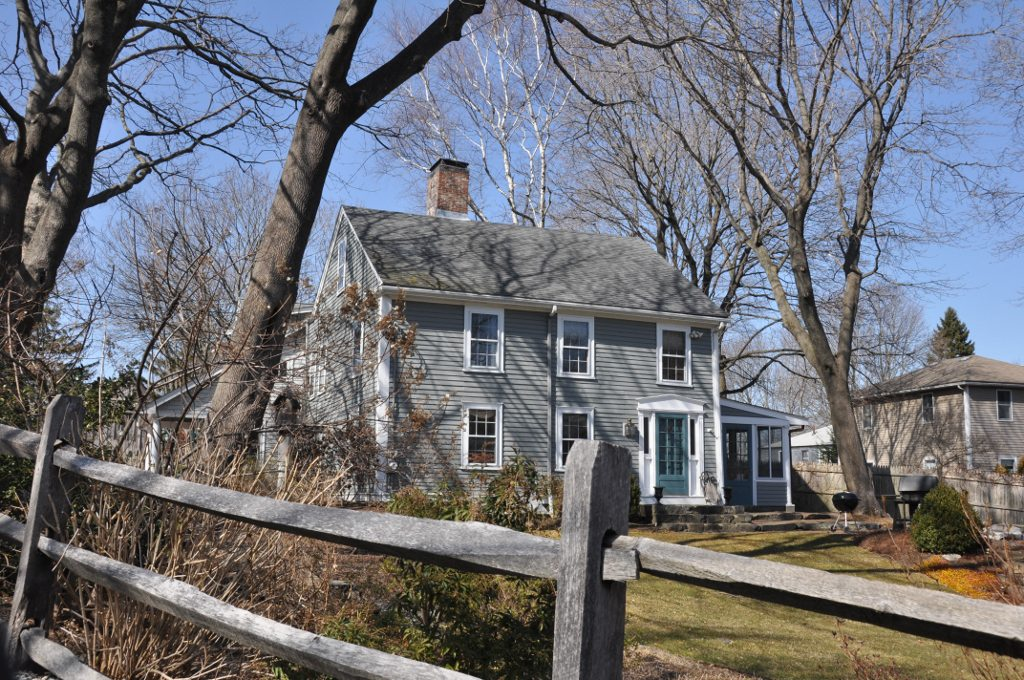

- Location within Massachusetts Location within the United States
- Location: 11 Manataug Trail, Marblehead, Massachusetts
- Coordinates: 42°30′27″N 70°52′9″W
- Built: c. 1720
- Architectural style: Colonial
- MPS: First Period Buildings of Eastern Massachusetts TR
- NRHP reference No.: 90000241
- Added to NRHP: March 9, 1990

The Harris Farm is a historic late First Period farmhouse in Marblehead, Massachusetts. It is a rare example of a three-bay house from that period. It was built c. 1720 as a two-story structure with one room on each floor, and an integral leanto section in the rear. The leanto section was later raised to a full two stories and the roof was rebuilt. Further additions in the 1950s added converted 19th-century sheds to the rear of the house, and the front door was replaced with a Colonial Revival style door.

The house was listed on the National Register of Historic Places in 1990.

== See also ==
- National Register of Historic Places listings in Essex County, Massachusetts
