= Marshall-Harris-Richardson House =

Historic house in North Carolina, United States

- U.S. National Register of Historic Places
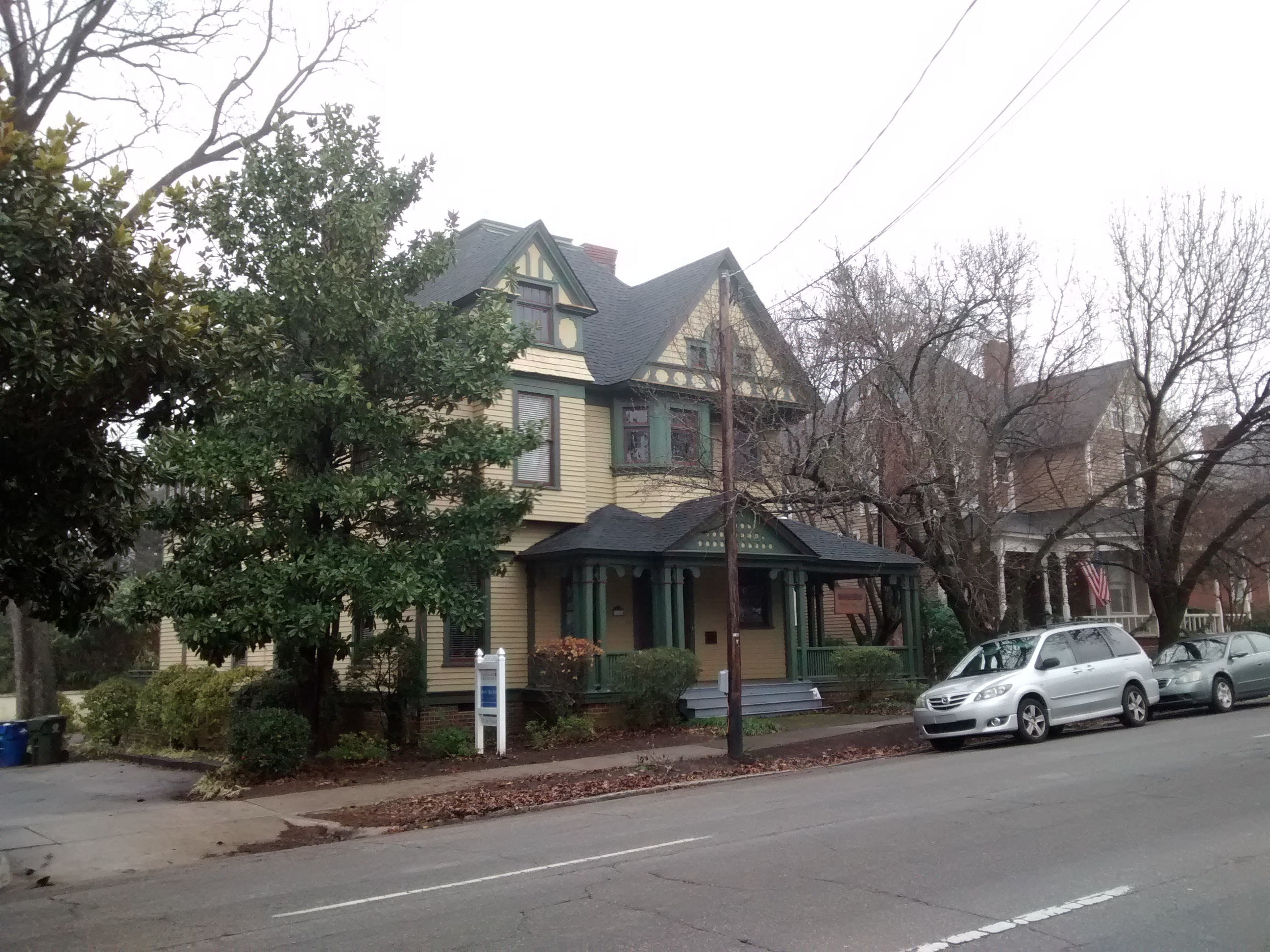
- Marshall-Harris-Richardson House, December 1985

- Location within North Carolina Location within the United States
- Location: 116 N. Person St., Raleigh, North Carolina
- Coordinates: 35°46′53″N 78°38′5″W
- Area: less than one acre
- Built: c. 1900
- Architectural style: Queen Anne
- NRHP reference No.: 86000403
- Added to NRHP: March 5, 1986

Marshall-Harris-Richardson House is a historic home located at Raleigh, Wake County, North Carolina. It was built about 1900, and is a two-story, asymmetrical, Queen Anne-style frame dwelling. It has a one-story, hip roofed front porch. It features a steeply pitched truncated hipped roof with projecting gables. It was moved to its present location in the fall of 1985.

It was listed on the National Register of Historic Places in 1986.
