= Harris Farm (Walkersville, Maryland) =

Historic house in Maryland, United States

- U.S. National Register of Historic Places
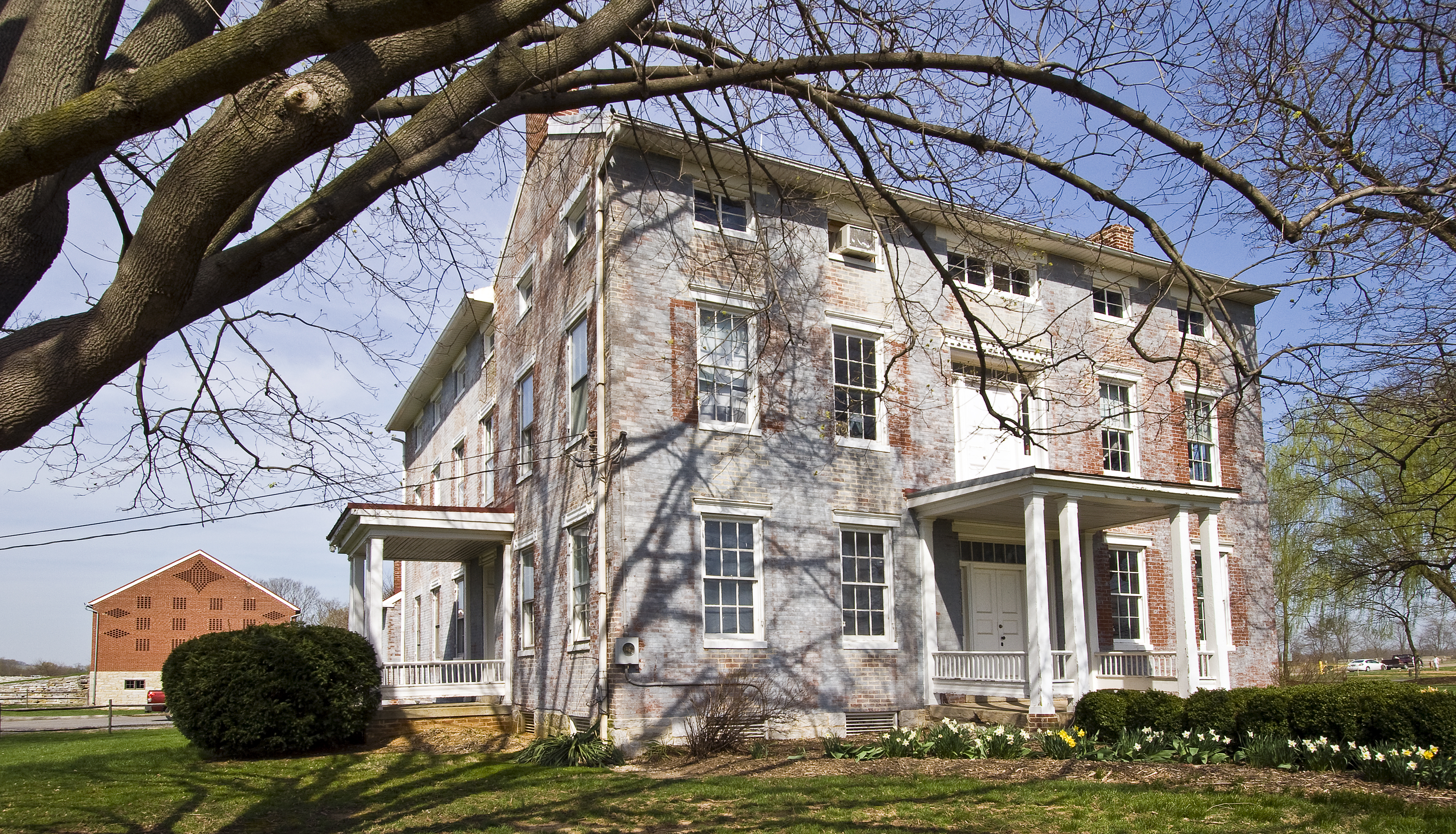
- Harris farmhouse and barn

- Location within Maryland Location within the United States
- Location: Junction of Devilbiss and Glade Rds., Walkersville, Maryland
- Coordinates: 39°29′55″N 77°20′57″W
- Area: 50 acres (20 ha)
- Built: 1855
- Architectural style: Greek Revival
- NRHP reference No.: 94000799
- Added to NRHP: July 29, 1994

Harris Farm is a historic home and farm complex located at Walkersville, Frederick County, Maryland, United States. The main house was built in 1855, and is a three-story center plan house in predominantly late Greek Revival syle, with some Italianate elements. The agricultural complex consists of a bank barn with an attached granary; a second frame barn that shares an animal yard with the bank barn; a row of frame outbuildings including a converted garage, a workshop, and a chicken house. There is also a drive-through double corn crib; and a frame pig pen from 1914. The 20th-century buildings consist of a frame poultry house, a dairy barn with milk house and two silos, and an octagonal chicken coop. A lime kiln is located on the edge of the property. The property is preserved as part of the Walkersville Heritage Farm Park.

The Harris Farm was listed on the National Register of Historic Places in 1994.

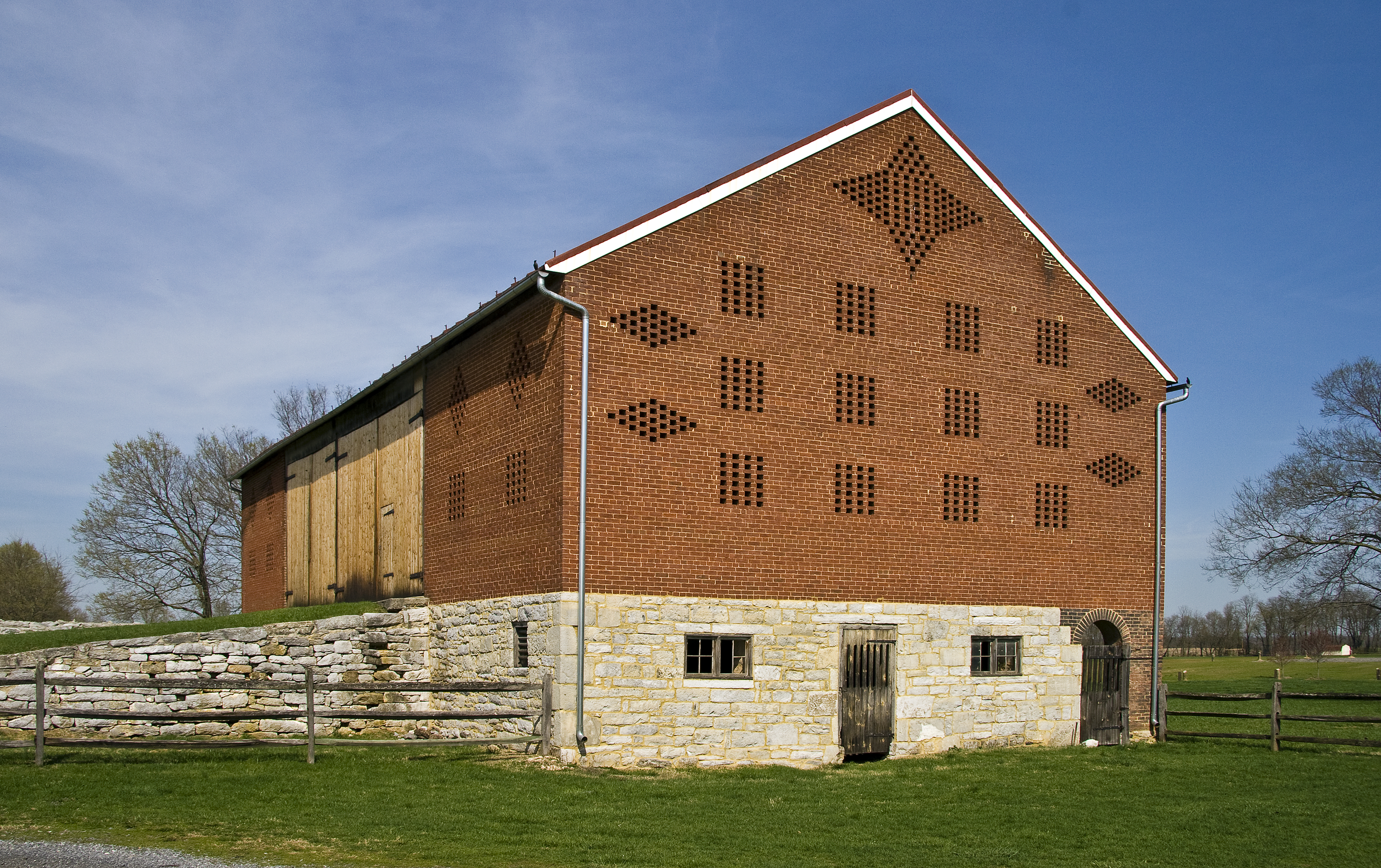
Bank barn at Harris Farm
