= V.R. Harris House =

- V. R. Harris House
- U.S. National Register of Historic Places
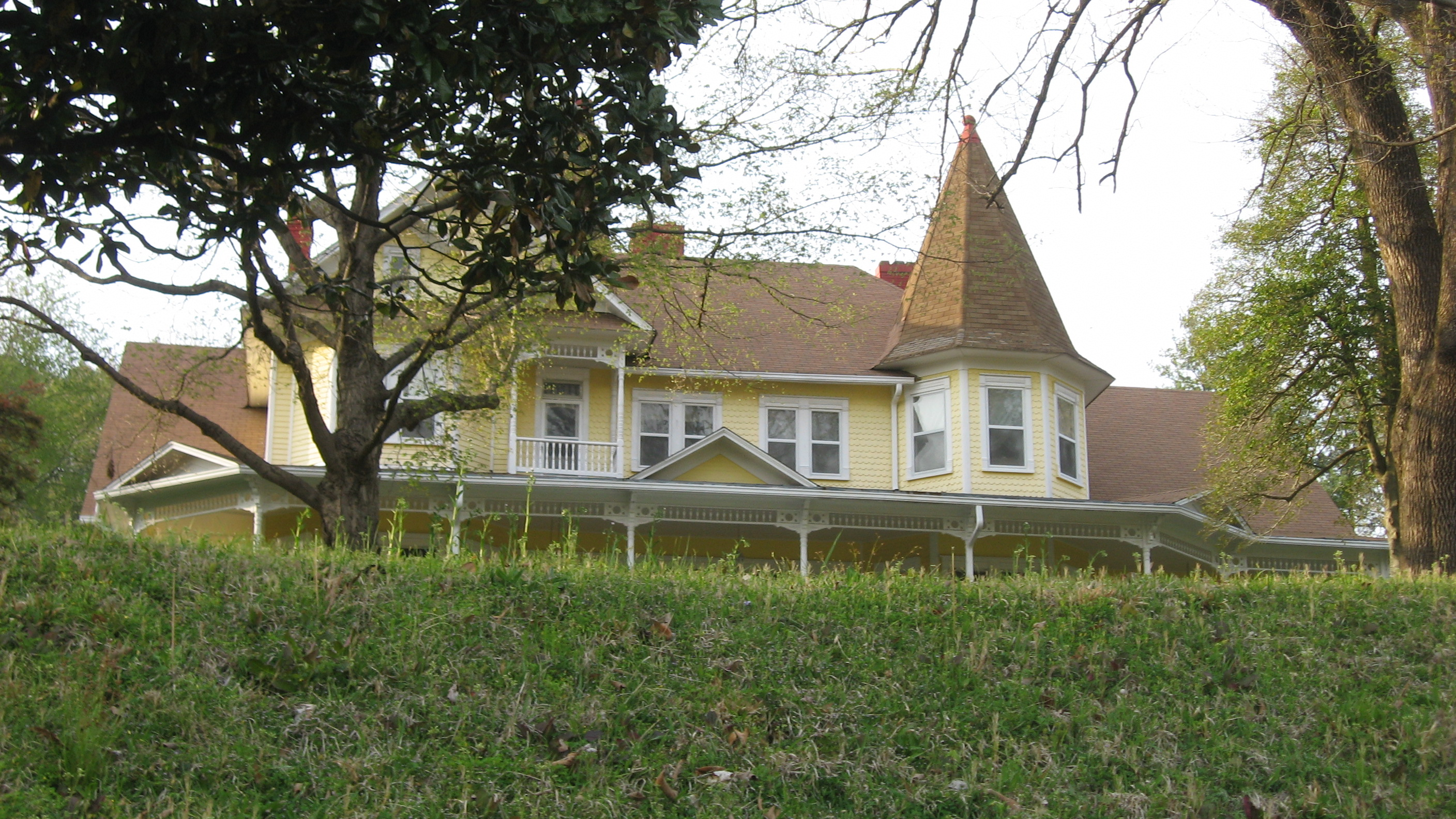
- The V.R. Harris House in 2014

- Location within Tennessee
- Location: Main Street, Erin, Tennessee
- Coordinates: 36°19′01″N 87°42′04″W
- Area: 2 acres (0.81 ha)
- Built: 1891
- Architectural style: Queen Anne
- NRHP reference No.: 83003040
- Added to NRHP: August 18, 1983

The V.R. Harris House, also known as the Mitchum House, is a historic house in Erin, Tennessee, U.S.. It was built in 1891 for Volney Rowe Harris, a businessman who served as the mayor of Erin in 1881. Harris lived here with his wife, née Lizzie Garner, and their twelve children. It remained in the Harris family until 1924. It was purchased by the Mitchum family in 1944, and it became known as the Mitchum House as a result.

The house was designed in the Queen Anne architectural style. It has been listed on the National Register of Historic Places since August 18, 1983.
