= Harris House (Sedalia, Missouri) =

Historic house in Missouri, United States

- U.S. National Register of Historic Places
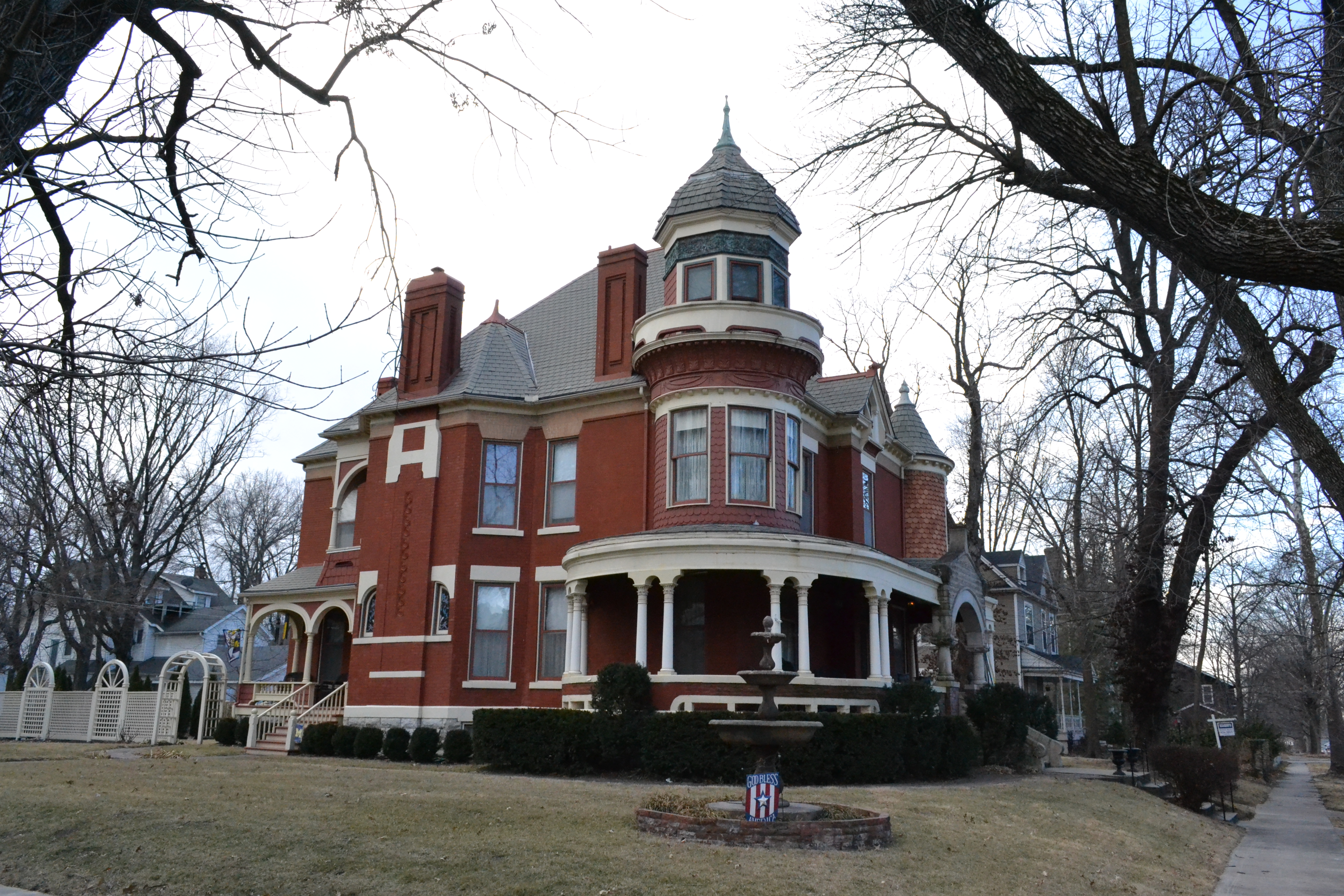

- Location within Missouri Location within the United States
- Location: 705 W. 6th St., Sedalia, Missouri
- Coordinates: 38°42′22″N 93°14′6″W
- Area: less than one acre
- Built: 1895
- Architectural style: Queen Anne
- NRHP reference No.: 79001387
- Added to NRHP: July 10, 1979

Harris House is a historic home located at Sedalia, Pettis County, Missouri. It was built about 1895, and is a three-story, Queen Anne style brick dwelling. It features a two-story tower, turreted oriel window, sweeping verandah, and porte cochere. Also on the property is a contributing carriage house.

It was listed on the National Register of Historic Places in 1979.
