= Harris-Borman House =

Historic house in Kansas, United States

- Harris--Borman House
- U.S. National Register of Historic Places
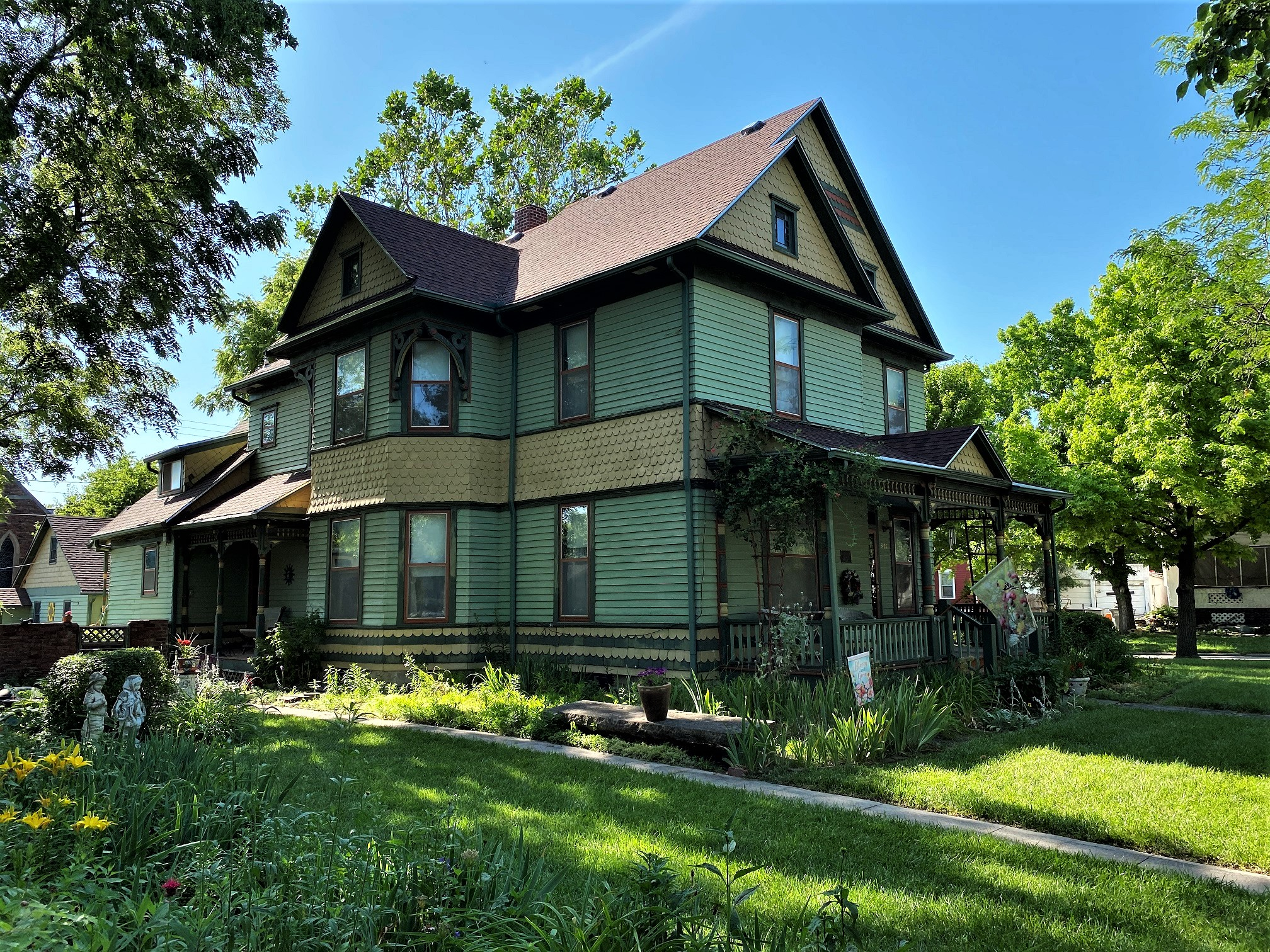

- Location within Kansas Location within the United States
- Location: 827 Mechanic; Emporia, Kansas
- Coordinates: 38°24′31″N 96°10′25″W
- Area: less than one acre
- Built: 1897
- Built by: Linley M. Harris
- Architectural style: Queen Anne
- NRHP reference No.: 92000431
- Added to NRHP: April 28, 1992

The Harris-Borman House, a Queen Anne-style house at 827 Mechanic in Emporia, Kansas, was built in 1897. It was listed on the National Register of Historic Places in 1992.

It was deemed notable "for its architectural significance as a transitional, Queen Anne residence." It was constructed by Linley M. Harris (1835-1924), a contractor and carpenter, as his home.

It is a two-and-a-half-story, front-gabled house on a limestone block foundation and is about 25 by 50 feet (7.6 m × 15.2 m) in plan.
