= Harris House, Toowoomba =

Heritage listed building in Toowoomba

Harris House
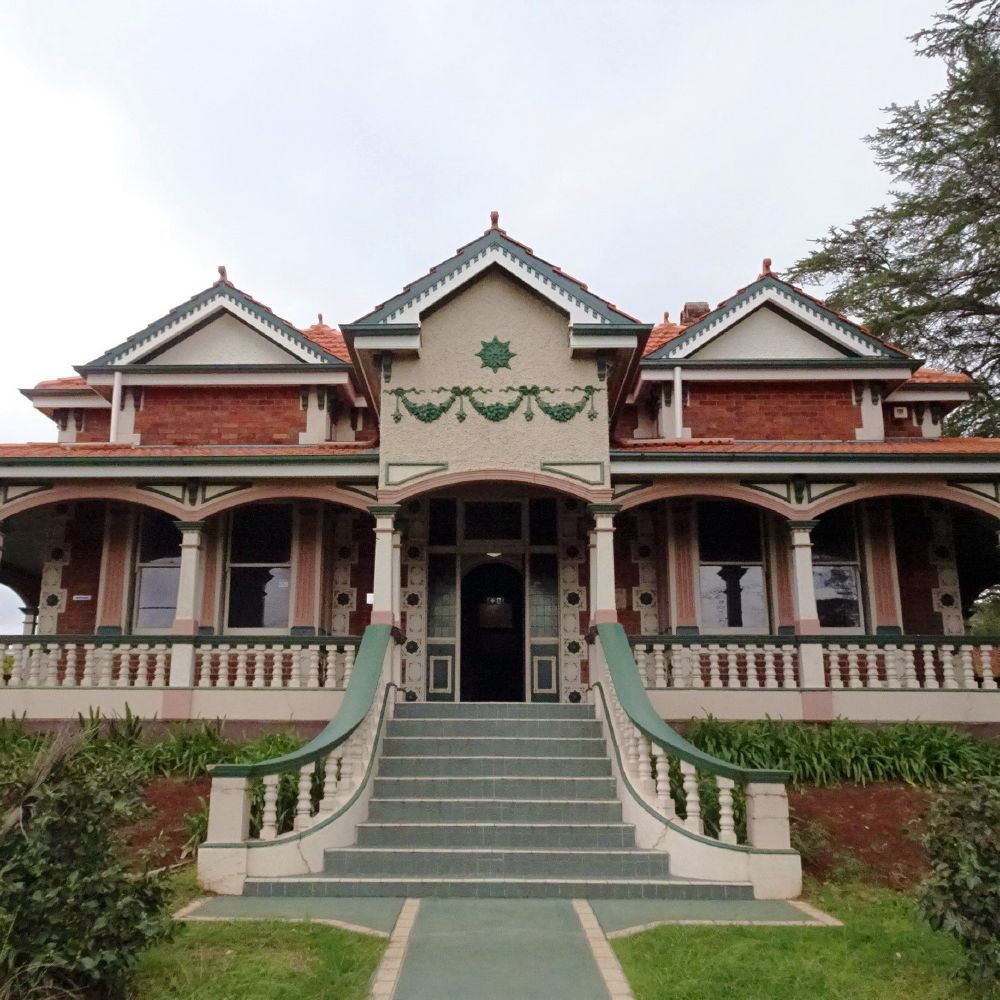
- Harris House, 2019

- Location within Queensland
- 27.5604°S 151.9471°E
- Location: 1 Clifford Street, Toowoomba City, Toowoomba, Toowoomba Region, Queensland, Australia

History
- Design period: 1900–1914 (Early 20th century)
- Built: 1912–1946, 1912

Site notes
- Architectural style: Eclectic

Queensland Heritage Register
- Official name: Harris House; Cliffordene
- Type: state heritage
- Designated: 26 July 2019
- Reference no.: 650237
- Type: Residential: Detached house
- Theme: Building settlements, towns, cities and dwellings: Dwellings
- Builders: Montague Ivory

Harris House is a heritage-listed house at 1 Clifford Street, Toowoomba City, Toowoomba, Toowoomba Region, Queensland, Australia. It was built from 1912 to 1946 by Montague Ivory. It is also known as Cliffordene. It was added to the Queensland Heritage Register on 26 July 2019.

== History ==
Harris House, a substantial Federation-era masonry residence, located at 1 Clifford Street in the regional city of Toowoomba, was constructed c. 1912, probably by its owner, Toowoomba building contractor Montague Ivory. It is important in demonstrating the development of Toowoomba as the principal urban centre of the Darling Downs region in the 20th century. Harris House also demonstrates the principal characteristics of a substantial early 20th century suburban villa residence and of Federation-era domestic architecture, and has aesthetic significance for its beautiful attributes, picturesque qualities and streetscape contribution.

European settlement of the Toowoomba area, traditional country of the Giabal and Jarowair people, commenced in 1840 when squatters occupied pastoral runs on the Darling Downs. The small settlement of Drayton evolved from 1842, but was soon surpassed by a more desirable location six kilometres to the northeast, known as Toowoomba from the 1850s. Better suited to market gardening, with a more reliable water supply, and supported by squatters and land speculators, Toowoomba was incorporated as a municipality (Borough of Toowoomba) in 1860. Its rapid economic and social development was influenced by local residents who strongly promoted the prospects of the town, and political representatives who successfully lobbied for government funding for civic improvements.

Toowoomba expanded rapidly from the late 1860s, becoming the main urban centre of the Darling Downs by 1888. The arrival of the Main Line railway in 1867 secured the town's development and subsequently made it the hub for the Southern and Western railways. The Selection Act 1868 brought selectors to the district, improvements to freehold estates, and revived trade with western areas. Toowoomba's economy diversified to include numerous small-scale manufacturing firms, while the majority of administrative, service and other government and education functions for the surrounding region were established in the town. Its progress was reflected in improvements to the physical environment, through important capital works projects, including the draining of its swamps, improved water supply, gasworks for lighting, extensive tree plantings and the initial development of Queen's Park. Earlier temporary structures were replaced with more permanent and impressive buildings.

Toowoomba experienced an urban land boom throughout the 1870s and 1880s. Newtown, its first working-class suburb, was created in the 1880s, while speculators extended the "shopkeepers" residential areas to the north east of Ruthven, Russell and Margaret Streets, the commercial core of the town. Prosperous Darling Downs landowners, business-owners and professionals established residences in Toowoomba; and from the 1880s, the town acted as a summer resort for those seeking a cooler climate, including Queensland Governors.

By the turn of the 20th century, Toowoomba had outstripped the development of every other urban centre on the Darling Downs, with its population in 1901 equalling their combined populations. After the passage of the Local Authorities Act 1902, Toowoomba became the Town of Toowoomba on 31 March 1903, and on 29 October 1904 was proclaimed the City of Toowoomba. The 1910s were a period of commercial and social expansion for the new city.

The land on which Harris House stands was purchased from the New South Wales government in 1852 by ex-convict and Bull's Head Inn publican William Horton, as part of an approximately 32-acre (13 ha) block. Horton became Toowoomba's "first, largest and most eager purchaser of land". In 1868, he sold the block to pastoralist and parliamentarian James Taylor, who was a major Toowoomba land speculator and advocate. Following Taylor's demise in 1892, approximately 17.5 acres (7.1 ha) of this land, bounded by Clifford, Margaret, West, and Hill Streets, was subdivided into 64 allotments each of 40 perches (1,000 m^{2}) in 1899. John Hugh Munro purchased subdivisions 1 to 3 of this estate, the site of Harris House, but subsequently sold the land in 1909 to Toowoomba building contractor, Montague Ivory. Earlier that year, Ivory had purchased adjoining allotments 4 and 5, while allotments 6 to 8 had been purchased in his wife's name.

Ivory was residing in Toowoomba and working as a building contractor by 1901. Born in 1861, he moved from Sydney to the Warrego region in Queensland c. 1892. He lived in Charleville from about 1893, where he was a tobacconist and the treasurer of the Charleville Branch of the AWU, until c. 1900.

Ivory's work as a building contractor in Toowoomba and Warwick during the first two decades of the 20th century included regionally important projects. In Toowoomba, he constructed a 75-foot (23 m) brick chimney stack at Perkins & Co. Brewery in Margaret St (1901), an additional storey on the Fire Brigade Building in Neil Street (1906), two additional wings for Crawford's Freemason's Hotel on the corner of Neil and Herries Streets (1906); and completed extensive alterations and additions to W Jones & Son's malt house at Black Gully in Toowoomba in 1907. In 1908, Ivory won the tender for additions and alterations to the Toowoomba Post and Telegraph Office. During 1910–11 Ivory resided in Warwick for 12 months, constructing a brick department store for Messrs Barnes & Co, before departing the town in March 1911. In 1923–24, Ivory designed the Queensland Brewery Ltd's new four-storey brewery in Toowoomba after it took over Breheny Brewery.

By 1913, Ivory was living in Harris House on the western corner of Clifford and Margaret Streets (1 Clifford Street) and remained there until c. 1919, when the house was sold. The designer and builder of the house are not known, but considering Ivory's role in the building industry, it is believed he built the house for himself, as well as the adjacent houses at 3 Clifford Street and 256 Margaret Street. In 1919, Ivory reconfigured the allotments that comprised 1 and 3 Clifford Street to create three allotments, including an allotment to the west, which became 256 Margaret Street. 3 Clifford Street was sold in 1920 and the purchaser was listed in the Queensland Post Office Directory as resident in the house in the same year, while 256 Margaret Street was sold in 1924 and its new owner listed as resident in the Queensland Post Office Directory in 1924.

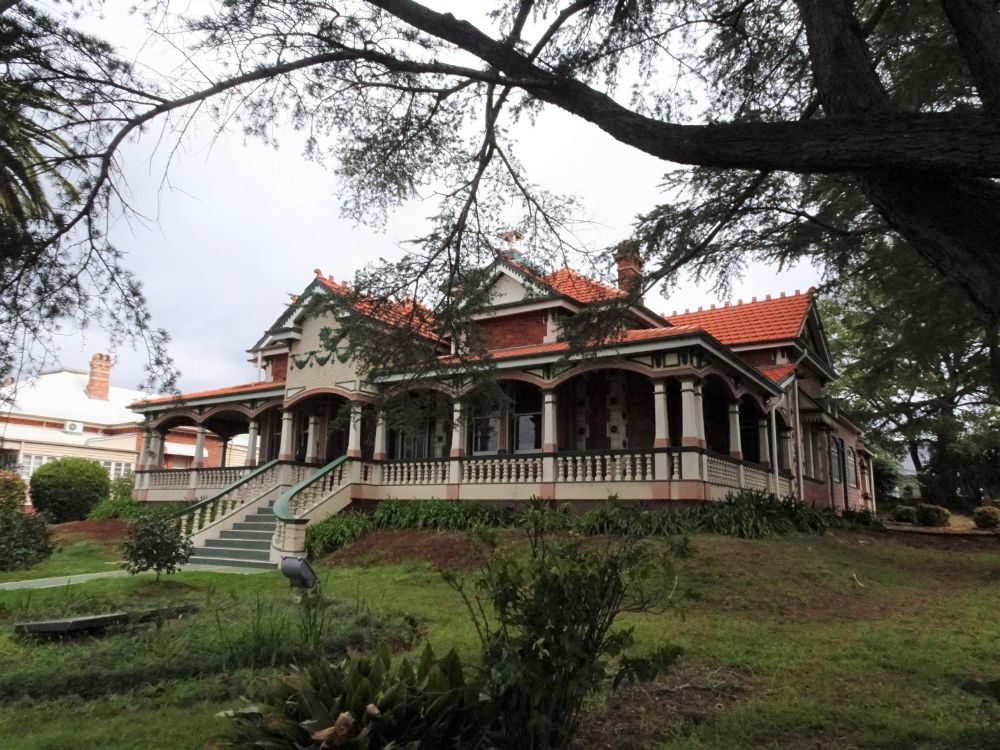
East and north elevations, 2019

Harris House was designed in an ornate style characteristic of the Federation-era. Federation style is a broad term used to describe the dominant style of Australia's domestic architecture during the late 19th and early 20th century. This eclectic and highly decorative style, influenced by contemporary British and American examples, drew inspiration from a variety of historical styles, but most notably from Tudor or "Old English" rural architecture. Sometimes described as "Queen Anne" style, and more decorative than the concurrent "Arts and Crafts" style, which focussed on honest expression of function and truthful use of materials, Federation style was used most extensively in New South Wales and Victoria. The typical Federation villa residence was a free-standing, single-storeyed bungalow set within a generous garden. It had red face brick walls, with a complex roof form of hips and projecting gables, clad in terracotta Marseilles tiles, and often punctuated by picturesque chimneys. Floor plans were asymmetrical with protruding rooms, bays or towers, and the exteriors were enlivened by a wide variety of window types and shapes, and elaborate verandah detailing. Gable ends were decorated with timber and stucco ornament, and leadlight windows displayed coloured glass in flowing patterns, demonstrating the growing influence of Art Nouveau on decorative details. Regional variations of the style occurred, due to factors such as localised building traditions, the availability of building materials and individual tastes. In Queensland, the style was often applied to traditional timber houses with corrugated iron roofs, influencing their roof forms, timber verandah detailing and other ornamentation. Non-domestic buildings too, at this time, adopted an eclectic "Free Style" of architecture that combined elements and details from classical, Romanesque, Art Nouveau, Queen Anne and Arts and Crafts styles, and utilised visually contrasting materials such as dark brick and light stone or stucco.

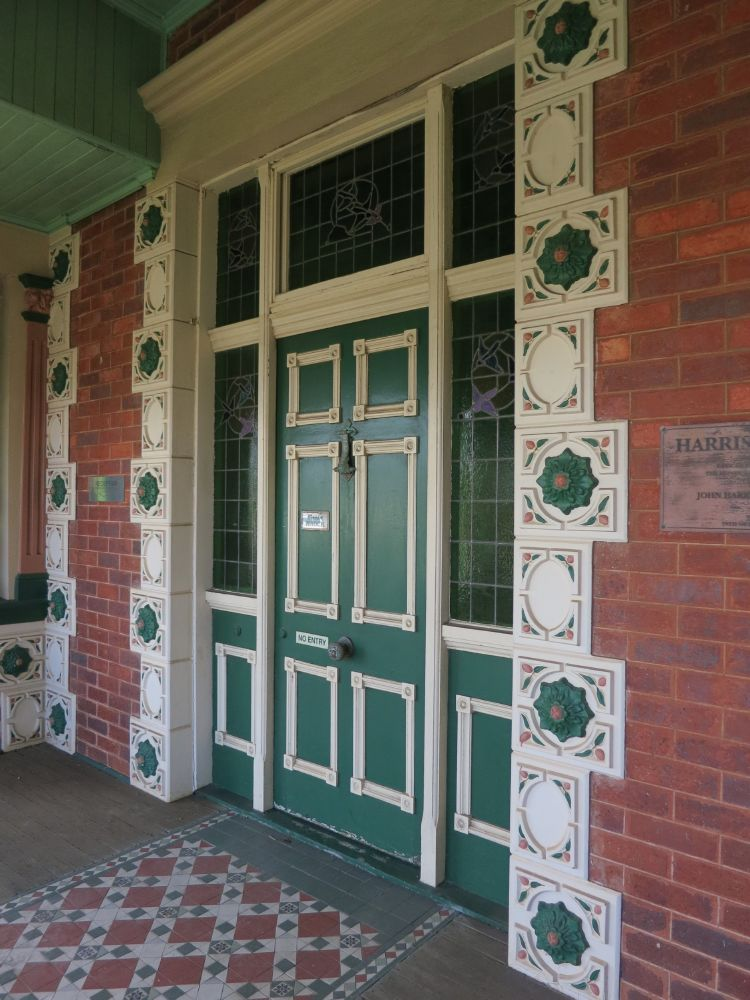
Front door, 2019

Harris House was a substantial, red face brick, single storey villa residence with a terracotta Marseilles tile-clad roof featuring multiple gables, three chimneys and a central roof lantern. It was elevated by an earth embankment above street level and its front verandah was accessed by wide staircase that led to a tall, gabled entrance portico. The exterior was highly ornamented with concrete mouldings that contrasted with the red brick walls, including quoins to wall corners, pilasters framing a pair of bay windows, and scrolled brackets to eaves and overhangs. The formal floor plan located principal rooms at the front (east) end of the house, accessed by a wide central passageway lit by the roof lantern, and service rooms at the rear (west). A rear entrance landing and laundry were, at some early stage, built up against the southwest corner of the house. In addition to the lantern, daylight to the centre and south-western parts of the house was maximised by high windows in the south and west walls, and glazed fanlights to all doors. The principal rooms were given high quality finishes and materials in popular contemporary materials and patterns. Surviving original or early features include plaster walls, timber floors and joinery, a variety of Wunderlich pressed metal ceilings and cornices, fireplaces with vibrant glazed tiles and ornate timber mantlepieces, leadlight windows with Art Nouveau-style patterns, and semi-circular arches with plasterwork ornamentation in the central passageway.

In 1919, Mary Kelly, wife of medical practitioner, Arthur F Kelly, purchased Harris House. In 1920, Ivory also sold his property at 3 Clifford Street to Charlotte Isabella Rutledge, wife of Frank H Rutledge, Rutledge was listed as resident in this house (Carwoola) in the Queensland Post Office Directory in 1924. Ivory resided at addresses in Margaret Street after sale of 1 Clifford Street. Ivory appears to be living at 256 Mary Street, but by 1923 he was living further west on Margaret Street at the house called "Ias-To-Ne". 256 Mary Street was sold to James Brown, Medical Practitioner in February 1924. The house was known as "Cliffordene" by the time the Kellys sold it in October 1921. The purchaser was John Mitchell Harris, who had recently married for the second time, to Malvena Sears. Harris' first wife died in Feb 1911. Harris married Malvena Sears on 21 May 1920. The 1923 edition of the Queensland Post Office Directory is the first to record the name "Cliffordene" for this house.

Harris, born c. 1862, arrived in Australia from Scotland in the late 1880s. By 1893, he owned a residence in Mary Street, Gympie. He was residing in Winton at the time of his first marriage in 1895. In 1897, he was working as a journalist in Winton, while in 1898 he was the proprietor of the Winton Herald newspaper. Between about October 1901 and 1905, Harris resided in Cairns, working as the manager of the drapery department of Burns Philp & Co, and travelling widely in North Queensland. In April 1906, Harris purchased GP Merry's drapery located in the Alexandra Building on Ruthven Street, Toowoomba. He built the business into one of the largest draperies on the Darling Downs, occupying the northern shop from 1906 until c. 1935. He was a member of the Queensland Turf Club, Tattersall's Turf Club, and the Toowoomba Turf Club, and also a life member of the Toowoomba Royal Agricultural Society. Harris died on 12 July 1933 at Sandgate, aged about 71 years. He was survived by his widow and daughter, Neva (born 1925).

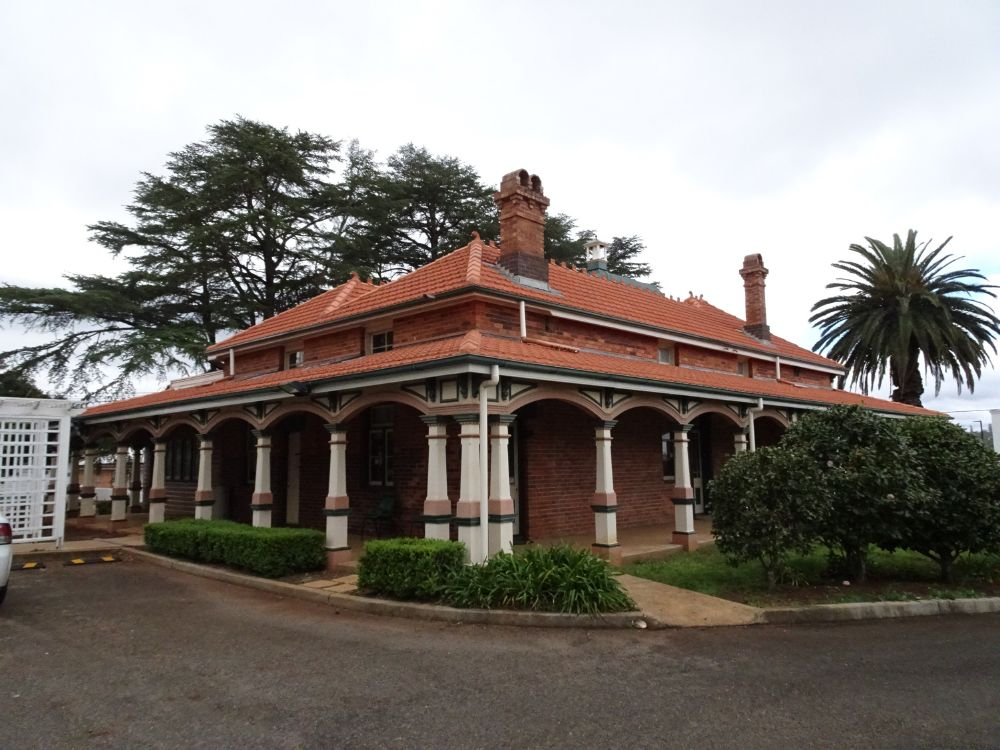
West and south elevations, 2019

It is unknown if Harris made any major alterations to Harris House during his residence there, but by 1934 a bathroom with shower and indoor toilet had been constructed on the south verandah. The grounds of Harris House were well established by the 1930s and contained a number of features. A pre-1934 sewerage detail plan of the property shows that an earth embankment ran around the north, east and south sides of the house. A wide pathway led straight to the main entrance stairs from Clifford Street, and two smaller, parallel pathways led south from a Margaret Street entrance, past the rear of the house. A fernery was located in the northwest corner of the grounds and a garage and earth closet in the southwest corner. A driveway to the garage ran along the southern boundary.

Following Harris' death, the executors of his estate approved additions and alterations to Harris House to create a flat on the north side of the house. Architect William Hodgen drew up the plans in May 1934 and the work commenced on 26 November that year. By 24 January 1935, contractor George Conrad Strohfeldt had completed the changes, for a cost of £279.10, and the house had been repainted by his brother, Henry Martin Strohfeldt, for £24.10.

The flat occupied the original sitting room and dining room, which were linked by a new sleep-out built on the north verandah. The sleep-out was carefully detailed to preserve the existing verandah structure and balustrade, and featured arched leadlight panels above banks of casement windows. A section of verandah adjacent to the west side of the dining room was demolished, and a timber, skillion-roofed structure built in its place, containing a dining room, kitchenette and bathroom. This addition was clad in timber chamferboards and had V-jointed (VJ) board and flat sheet linings. A door was inserted to link the flat's dining room with the service rooms of the original house, and a second laundry was created by dividing off part of the existing laundry.

The flat was tenanted by April 1935, when Mrs Cowan and her daughter, of Stanthorpe, were reported as having rented Mrs J M Harris's flat in Clifford Street. The flat was available for rental again in November 1938 when Mr and Mrs Harold Walsh stayed in the flat "for some weeks" holiday in Toowoomba. Mrs Harris continued to reside at 1 Clifford Street until c. 1984. She died in 1988.

Aerial photographs show that by 1946 the gardens contained a dense grouping of trees and plantings in the northwest corner (in the vicinity of the fernery) and three mature Atlas cedars (Cedrus atlantica), along the Margaret Street boundary.

For a number of years leading up to 1990, the house was unoccupied and required repairs to cracked internal walls. Its picket fence had been removed and replaced with a metal fence.

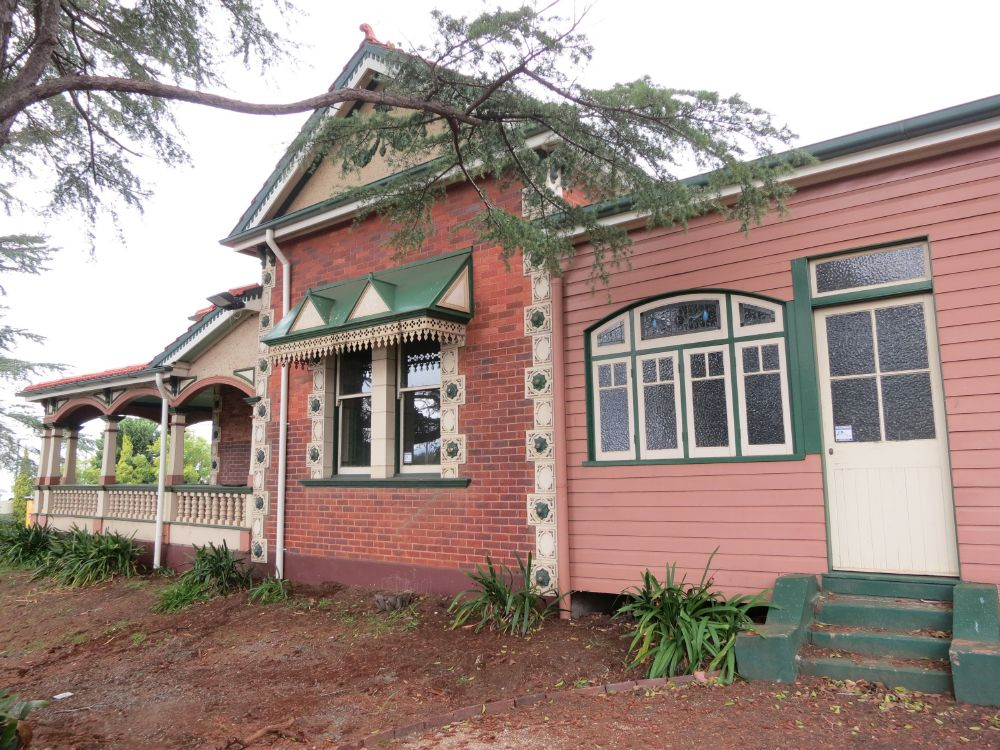
North elevation, 2019

In March 1991 plans were drawn by Anthony Kibble & Associates Architects to convert the residence into multi-tenancy offices. Alterations and additions included: a new bitumen driveway and carpark in the southwest corner of the grounds; the replacement of the verandah rooms, laundry and landings along the south and west sides of the house with a concrete verandah matching the existing front verandah; installation of toilets and a kitchenette; removal of the 1935 sleepout on the north verandah; relocation of the windows from the sleepout to the rear 1935 rooms; removal of the bathroom and kitchenette in the 1935 rooms; and other repairs and renovations, including painting the exterior.

On 15 October 1994, after completion of these alterations, the Honourable Mr Justice John Harris Byrne RFD, grandson of John Mitchell Harris, opened 1 Clifford Street as Harris House. A brass plaque adjacent to the front door commemorates the official opening. The building served as offices in subsequent years.

After the death of its owner, Neva Byrne, née Harris, on 14 August 2014, the house was gifted to the National Trust of Australia (Queensland) (NTAQ). By the end of May 2019, the NTAQ had retiled the roof, painted the building's exterior, and plastered and painted the interior for use as offices and meeting rooms.

In 2019, Harris House is no longer a private residence, but retains a high degree of intactness. Its garden includes pathways and remnant mature trees. It is a good example of a substantial early 20th century suburban villa residence from the Federation era, which reflects the wealth and status of the major city of Toowoomba.

== Description ==
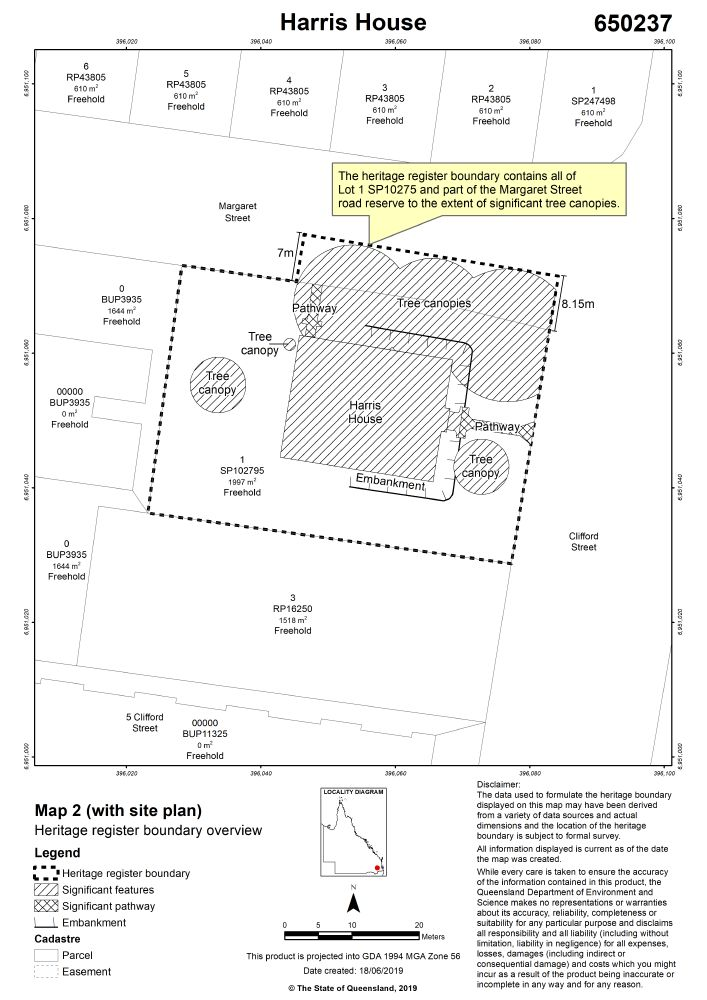
Site map, 2019

Harris House is a substantial, single storey villa residence in a Federation-era style. It occupies a prominent 0.19 hectares (0.47 acres) site on the corner of Margaret and Clifford streets, located within a mixed residential and commercial area on the western side of the Toowoomba central business district. Facing Clifford Street to the east, the house is elevated above street level and a wide staircase leads to the main entrance. The house is set within established gardens containing mature trees. In 2019 the property is undergoing repairs and renovations.

=== House (c. 1912, with 1935 and 1994 additions) ===
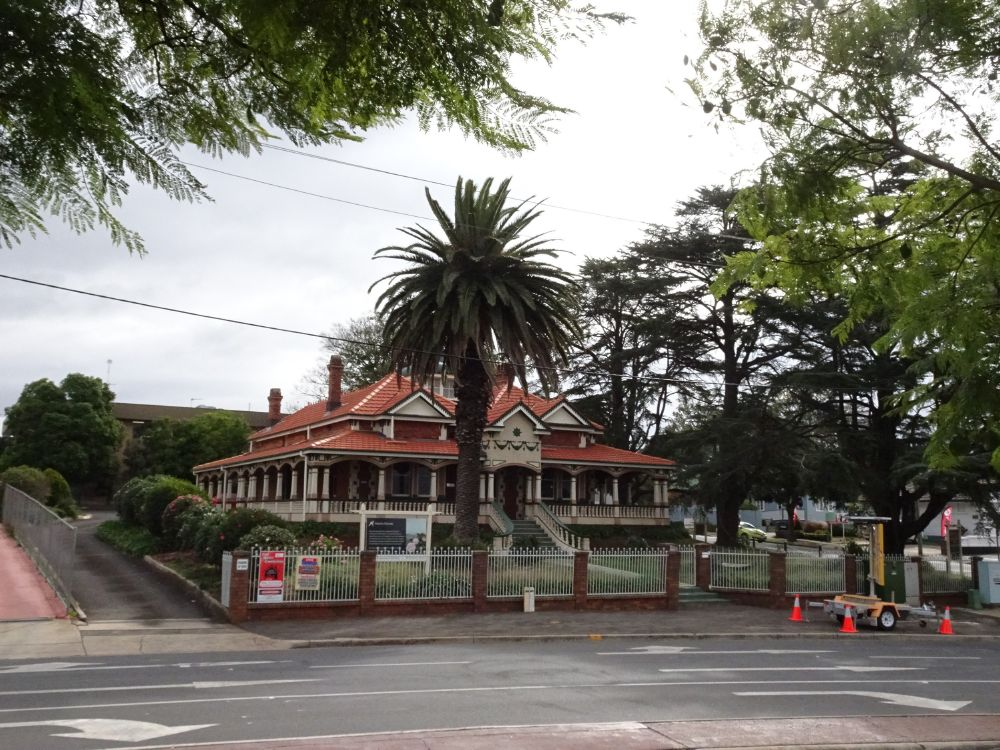
View from Clifford Street, 2019

The single storey house is of red face brick construction with a tiled roof, central roof lantern, and wide verandahs around most of its perimeter. The front (east) elevation is the most ornate, with a tall entrance portico the dominant feature. Rectangular bay windows are symmetrically placed on either side of the main entrance door, which has a glazed surround. The red face brick contrasts with extensive concrete elements and ornamentation.

The rooms are arranged in a hierarchy with principal rooms in the front (east) section of the house, and service rooms in the rear (west) section. The front section contains four rooms, an entrance vestibule, a wide central passageway lit by the roof lantern, and a side passage leading to a south entrance door. Rooms on the south side of the central passageway were likely to have been bedrooms. The northeast corner room was likely a sitting or drawing room, with the dining room adjacent.

The rear section contains a central passageway that leads to a west entrance door, with the original kitchen and a third bedroom on the south side. Former storage/servants rooms on the north side of the passageway are fitted out as toilets and a kitchenette (1994). A skillion-roofed, timber-clad addition in the northwest corner of the house (1935) contains two interconnected rooms.

=== Grounds and views ===
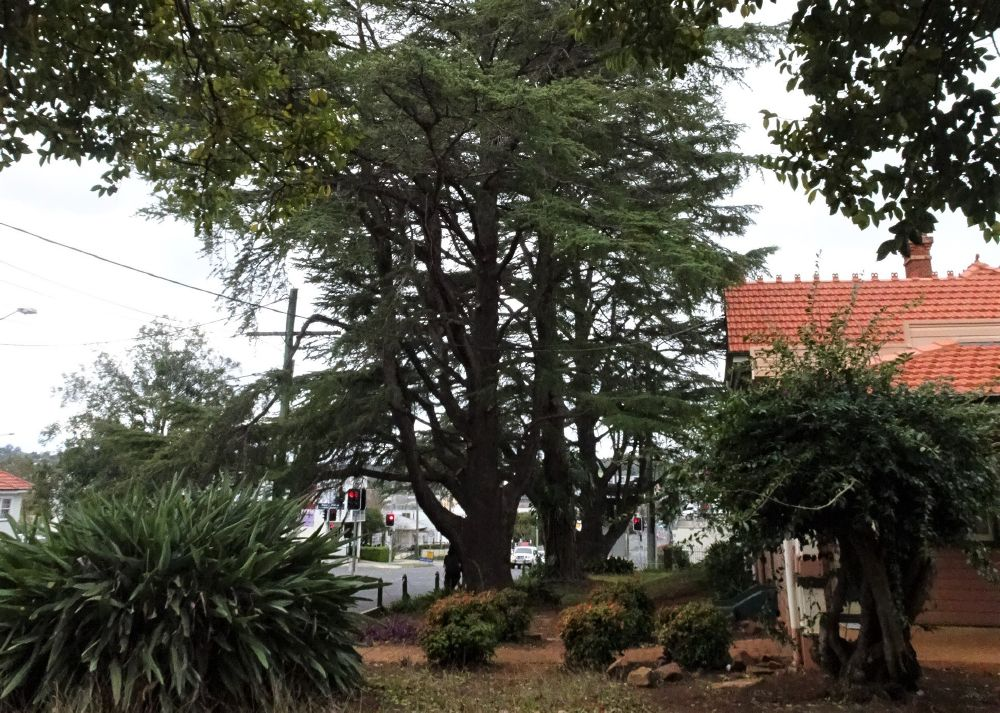
Mature garden, 2019

Harris House is set back from Clifford and Margaret streets, and surrounded by gardens on the east, north and northwest sides. The gardens contain a number of large, mature trees, open lawns and garden beds. The location of some early pathways has been retained, now formed by modern materials. The house's elevation above street level and corner location make it a prominent feature of the streetscape.

== Heritage listing ==
Harris House was listed on the Queensland Heritage Register on 26 July 2019 having satisfied the following criteria.

The place is important in demonstrating the evolution or pattern of Queensland's history.

Harris House (c. 1912), a Federation-era villa residence, is important in demonstrating the development of Toowoomba as the principal urban centre of the Darling Downs region in the 20th century. During the late 19th and early 20th century, wealthy members of society in the region established substantial homes in Toowoomba, such as Harris House, reflecting their financial and social position.

Through its setting, form, scale, design, materials and aesthetic treatment, Harris House illustrates the lifestyle of Toowoomba's prosperous residents.

The place is important in demonstrating the principal characteristics of a particular class of cultural places.

Harris House is important in demonstrating the principal characteristics of a substantial, early-20th century suburban villa residence. A single storey, masonry house in a garden setting, Harris House is a fine and intact example of its type, displaying high quality workmanship and materials, and retaining its formal plan, with entrance portico, hierarchical arrangement of generously sized rooms, and surrounding verandah.

Harris House demonstrates the principal characteristics of Federation-era domestic architecture, and is a good and highly intact example of a masonry house in a Federation style in Queensland. Characteristics of this type include: its lowest form; asymmetrical plan with protruding bays and rooms; red face brick construction; complex roof form clad in terracotta tiles; elaborate verandah detailing; leadlight glazing to principal windows; and use of a wide variety of ornamental features derived from historical styles. The high quality interior finishes and fittings demonstrate popular contemporary materials and patterns, including a range of pressed metal ceilings and cornices, glazed tiles, and the use of art nouveau-style motifs for ceilings, mantelpieces and leadlight glazing.

The place is important because of its aesthetic significance.

Harris House is important for the beautiful attributes of its composition and fine architectural quality. The symmetrical east façade is a well-proportioned composition of formal building elements including bay windows, ornamental gables and a tall projecting portico, which, in combination with the house's elevation above street level and substantial front staircase, creates an impressive entrance sequence. Rooms are formally arranged around a wide central passageway, which is dramatically lit by a roof lantern. Largely intact, the generously sized rooms and spaces retain high quality fittings and finishes, including timber joinery, decorative plasterwork, ornate mantelpieces and pressed metal ceilings.

The house is visually prominent on its elevated corner site and framed by mature trees, including three large Atlas cedar trees, which make a substantial contribution to its Federation-era suburban villa setting.
