= Jonathan Newton Harris House =

Historic house in Connecticut, United States

- U.S. National Register of Historic Places
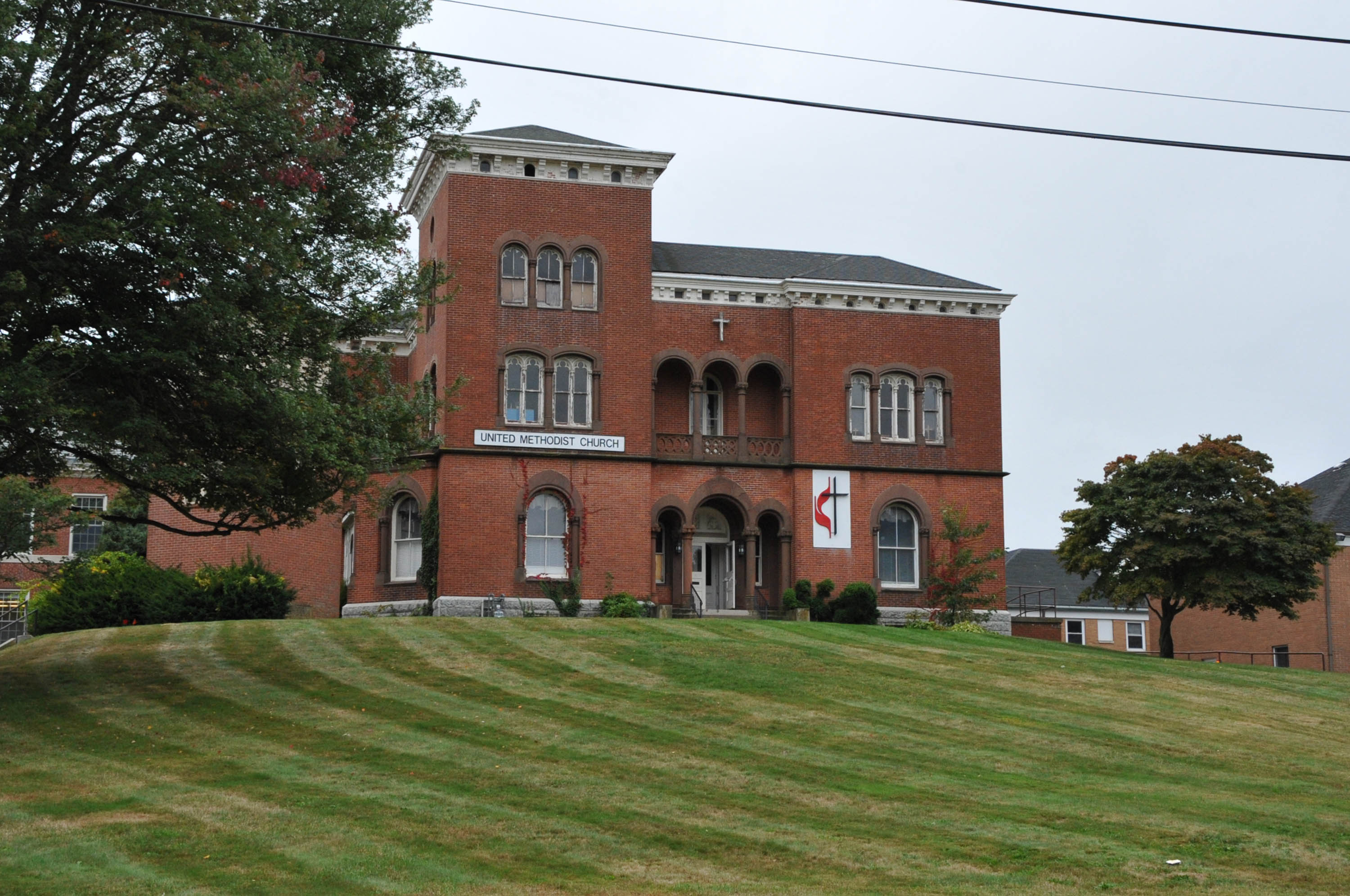

- Location within Connecticut Location within the United States
- Location: 130 Broad Street, New London, Connecticut
- Coordinates: 41°21′27″N 72°6′17″W
- Area: 1.3 acres (0.53 ha)
- Built: 1860
- Built by: Crandall, Lewis
- Architect: Eidlitz, Leopold
- Architectural style: Italian Villa
- NRHP reference No.: 82004375
- Added to NRHP: April 27, 1982

The Jonathan Newton Harris House is at historic house at 130 Broad Street in New London, Connecticut. Completed in 1860 to a design by Leopold Eidlitz, it is a major local example of Italianate and Renaissance Revival architecture. It was built for Jonathan Newton Harris, a prominent local businessman who was mayor of New London at the time of its construction. The house was listed on the National Register of Historic Places on April 27, 1982. It is now home to New London's United Methodist Church.

== Description and history ==
The Jonathan Newton Harris House is located northwest of downtown New London, at the south corner of Broad and Williams Streets. It is set on a knoll, with a variety of government facilities in other architecturally distinguished buildings located nearby. It is a large brick structure, two stories in height, with Italianate and Renaissance Revival styling. Prominent features include a three-story tower with a shallow-pitch pyramidal roof, a cornice with heave Italianate brackets, and windows arranged in groups, either with rounded arch tops or segmented arch tops. At the center of the main facade, on the second floor above the main entrance, is a recessed arcade with brownstone columns and balustrade.

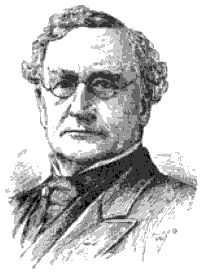
Jonathan Newton Harris

The house was built in 1859–60, to a design by Leopold Eidlitz, a protégé of Richard Upjohn, who was then promoting Italianate design ideas. Jonathan Newton Harris, for whom it was built, was a local businessman whose success began as a grocer and seller of farm equipment, and expanded to encompass a wide variety of interests. Harris was mayor of New London from 1856 to 1862. The house was extensively modified in 1891 as a classroom building for the Williams Memorial Institute, and again in the 20th century, when it was adapted for use as a church.

== See also ==
- National Register of Historic Places listings in New London County, Connecticut
