= Harris-Merrick House =

Historic house in Massachusetts, United States

- U.S. National Register of Historic Places
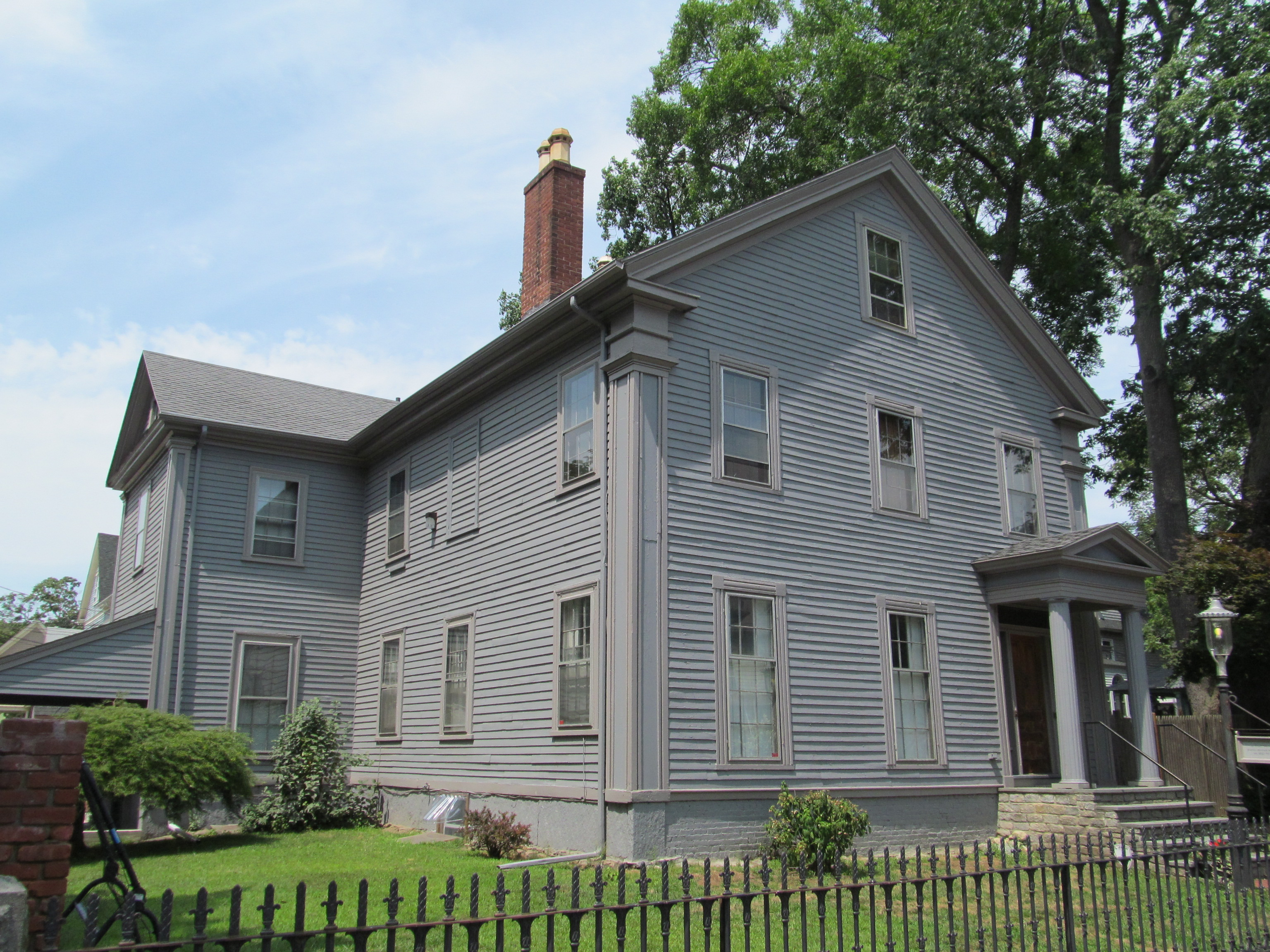
- Harris-Merrick House

- Location within Massachusetts Location within the United States
- Location: 41 Fruit St., Worcester, Massachusetts
- Coordinates: 42°16′5″N 71°48′39″W
- Area: less than one acre
- Built: 1832
- Architectural style: Greek Revival
- MPS: Worcester MRA
- NRHP reference No.: 80000602
- Added to NRHP: March 05, 1980

The Harris-Merrick House is an historic house at located 41 Fruit Street in Worcester, Massachusetts. Built sometime between 1832 and 1844, it is a good example of Greek Revival architecture, and a rare surviving element of the early residential development west of downtown Worcester. The house was listed on the National Register of Historic Places on March 5, 1980.

== Description and history ==
The Harris-Merrick House is located west of downtown Worcester in a residential area, at the southwest corner of Fruit Street and Marston Way. It is an L-shaped 2 1/2-story wood-frame structure, with a gabled roof and clapboarded exterior. The building corners have paneled pilasters, and some of its gables are fully pedimented. The main facade is three bays wide, with full-length first story windows, and the main entrance in the rightmost bay. It is sheltered by a porch with round columns, entablature, and fully pedimented gable.

The house was built c. 1832–1844 on Chestnut Street, and is one of the few buildings to survive from the early days of development on the city's west side. The area was developed in the 1830s (with many houses designed by Elias Carter), and this house was built either for Clarendon Harris, a bookkeeper who purchased the land in 1832, or Pliny T. Merrick, who owned it in 1844. Merrick was one of the city's most prominent attorneys whose own home stood adjacent to this one's original lot. The house was moved to its present location in 1874, at which time it was converted into a two-family residence.

== See also ==
- National Register of Historic Places listings in northwestern Worcester, Massachusetts
- National Register of Historic Places listings in Worcester County, Massachusetts
