= Harry House =

Australian rules footballer, born 1919

Personal information
- Full name: Henry John House
- Born: 15 July 1919; Broken Hill, New South Wales
- Died: 20 November 2006 (aged 87)
- Original team: Sturt / West Adelaide
- Height: 173 cm (5 ft 8 in)
- Weight: 73 kg (161 lb)

Playing career^{1}
Years	Club	Games (Goals)
1942	St Kilda	2 (0)
- ^{1} Playing statistics correct to the end of 1942.

Henry John House (15 July 1919 – 20 November 2006) was an Australian rules footballer who played with St Kilda in the Victorian Football League (VFL). Harry House has four children and several grandchildren and great-grandchildren.
