= Spencer Harris House =

Historic house in North Carolina, United States

- U.S. National Register of Historic Places
- Location within North Carolina Location within the United States
- Location: 1287 NC 121, near Falkland, North Carolina
- Coordinates: 35°39′15″N 77°30′51″W
- Area: 1 acre (0.40 ha)
- Built: c. 1855
- Architectural style: Greek Revival
- NRHP reference No.: 04001527
- Added to NRHP: January 20, 2005

Spencer Harris House, also known as the William T. Harris Homeplace, is a historic home located near Falkland, Pitt County, North Carolina. It was built about 1855, and is a two-story, three-bay, double pile Greek Revival style frame dwelling. It is sheathed in weatherboard siding, has a low hipped roof, and rests on a brick pier foundation.

It was listed on the National Register of Historic Places in 2005.
