= William B. Harris House =

Historic house in Ohio, United States

- U.S. National Register of Historic Places
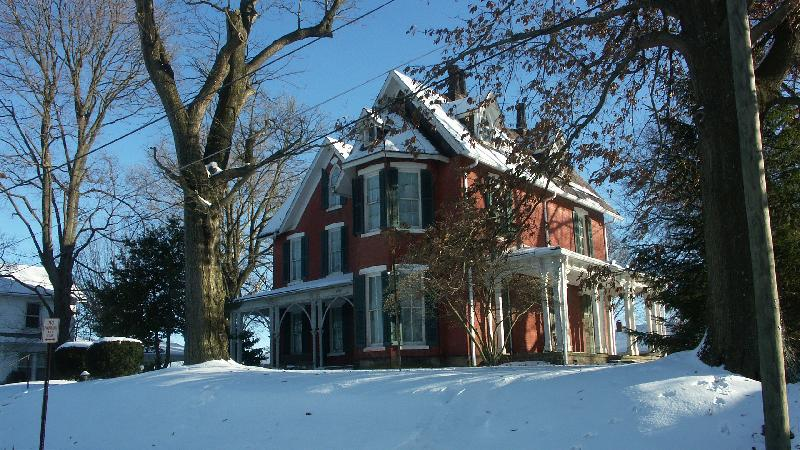
- Front of the house

- Location within Ohio Location within the United States
- Location: 1320 Newman Dr., Zanesville, Ohio
- Coordinates: 39°56′24″N 81°59′28″W
- Area: less than one acre
- Built: 1863
- Architect: William B. Harris
- Architectural style: Gothic Revival
- NRHP reference No.: 78002161
- Added to NRHP: May 22, 1978

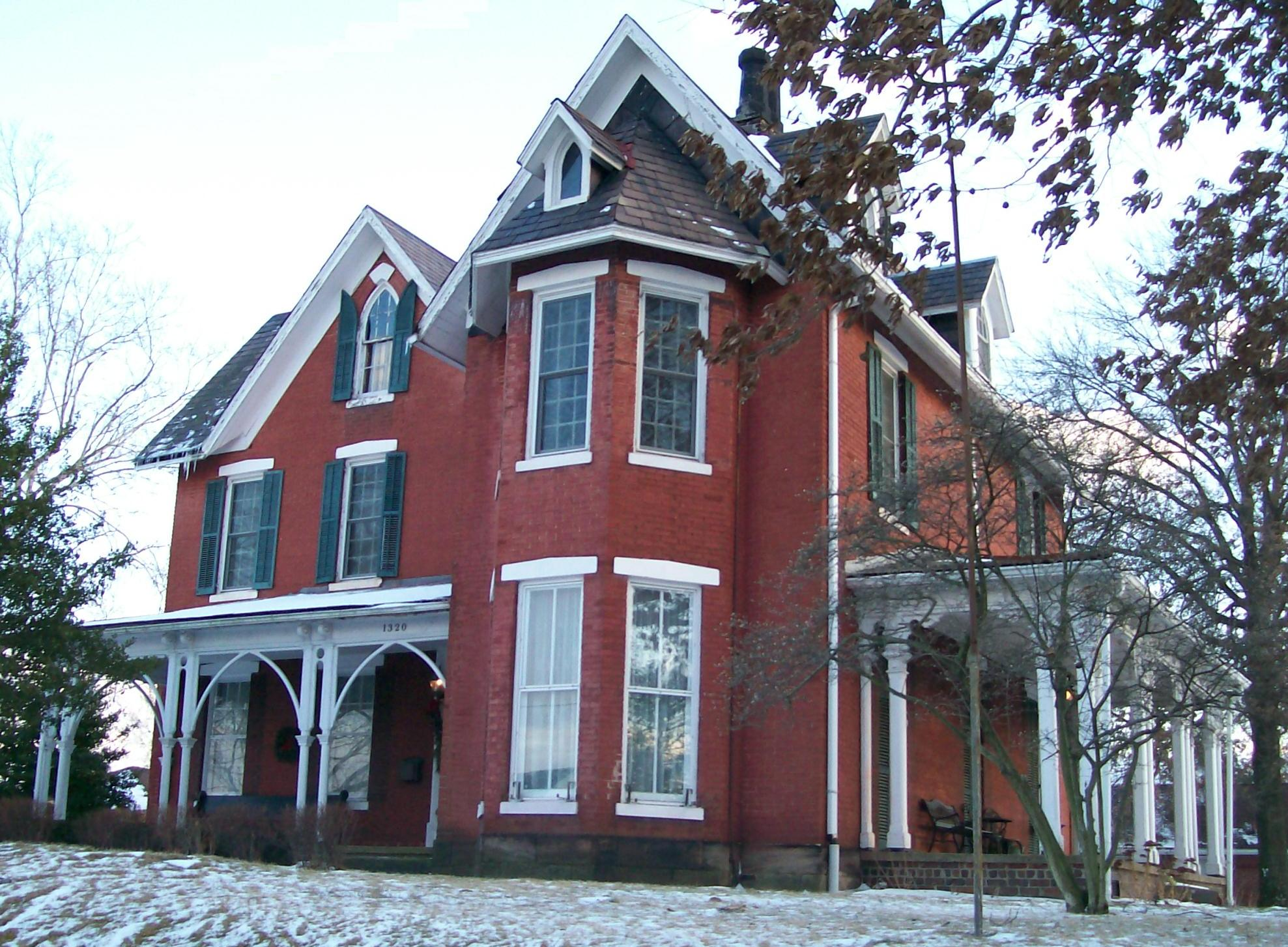
William B. Harris house

The William B. Harris House is a historic residence in Zanesville, Ohio, United States. A Gothic Revival building constructed in 1863, it lies along Newman Drive on the city's eastern side. In 1978, the house and one related building were listed together on the National Register of Historic Places because of their historically significant architecture.
