= Smith–Harris House (East Lyme, Connecticut) =

Historic house in Connecticut

- Thomas Avery House
- U.S. National Register of Historic Places
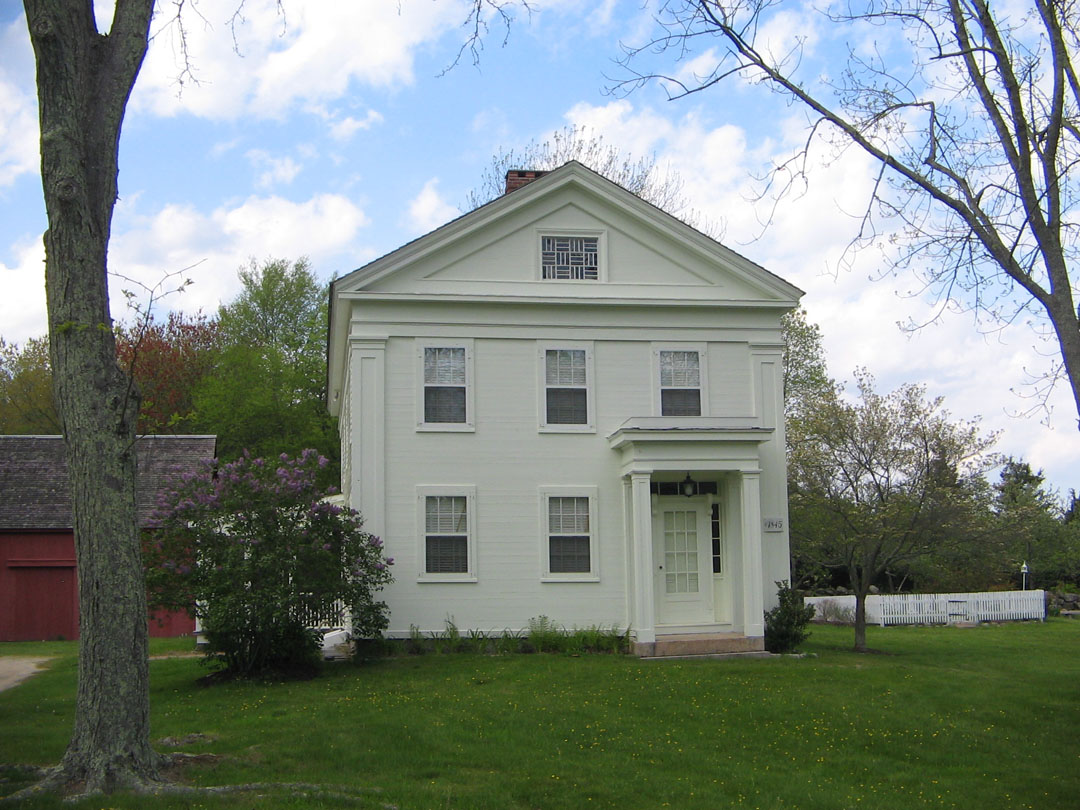
- Location: 33 Society Road, East Lyme, Connecticut
- Coordinates: 41°20′58.3″N 72°12′55.8″W
- Built: 1845/1846
- Architectural style: Greek Revival
- NRHP reference No.: 79002637
- Added to NRHP: August 22, 1979

The Smith–Harris House, listed on the National Register of Historic Places as the Thomas Avery House, is a 2 1/2-story clapboarded Greek Revival home at 33 Society Road in East Lyme, Connecticut. It is believed that the farmhouse was built in 1845–1846 as a wedding gift for Thomas Avery and Elizabeth Griswold. It remained in the Avery family until 1877, when it was purchased by William H. Smith. By the 1890s, the farm was managed by Smith's younger brother Herman W. Smith and nephew Frank A. Harris. In 1955, the house was sold to the Town of East Lyme. It was saved from demolition by citizens and restored. It opened on July 3, 1976 as a historic house museum, operated and maintained by the Smith–Harris House Commission and the Friends of Smith–Harris House. It is open from June through August and throughout the year by appointment. The Smith–Harris house was added to the National Historic Register of Places on August 22, 1979.

== History ==
The Smith–Harris House is believed to have been preceded by another dwelling that was used in the construction. The Avery family lived in the area from at least 1751, and the property and the surrounding farm were consolidated under Jonathan Avery's son Abraham. It is likely that the house was built in 1845-1846 for Thomas Avery and his bride Elizabeth Griswold. The house remained in the Avery family until 1877, when it was sold to William H. Smith.

By the 1890s, the farm was managed by Smith's younger brother Herman W. Smith and nephew Frank A. Harris. In 1900, the two married Lula and Florence Munger, sisters, and both resided in the house. William H. Smith deeded the house to his brother and nephew in 1921. Smith died in 1951 and his widow and Frank Harris, shortly before his death, sold the house and the 103 acres (41.6 hectares) of land to the Town of East Lyme for $34,000. The two widows continued to live in the house until they went to a nursing home. The land served as a farm under the Avery family, including a dairy and cattle farm; the dairy farm would continue to operate under the Harris family. Portions of the land were later used for the construction of Interstate 95 and two East Lyme Schools. The two schools are East Lyme Junior High School (East Lyme Middle School) and Lillie B. Haines Elementary School.

== Design ==
The Smith–Harris House is a 2 1/2-story clapboarded Greek Revival house with a pedimented gable on the front facade. The house is composed of a 2 1/2-story, 23-by-45-foot (7.0 by 13.7 m) block and a single-story, 10-foot (3.0 m) kitchen wing. It retains the original clapboarding with horizontal flush on the facade. The front facade has a typical three-bay design with the entrance supported by pilasters with squared, recessed panels for the main door frame and frieze. The entrance porch is not original, it was replaced as part of the restoration effort and its design originates from previous photographs. The foundation is made of locally sourced granite slabs and includes a full basement. The square gable windows feature small panes in wooden muntins. All windows retain their original double-hung sash with 6-over-6 windows, except for the rear windows on the second floor. The one-story kitchen wing has a pitched lean-to roof. Another part of the restoration was the open porch that replaced an ell. At the time of its National Historic Register of Places nomination, the gable roof was covered with cedar shingles as part of the restoration effort.

Passing through the entrance leads to the stairhall, with the on the right stairs side and a doorway leading to the parlor on the left. The back of the stairwell leads to another room that connects to a side-room on the left and into the kitchen. The kitchen features access to the other rooms, a back entrance, a back stairway and a separate kitchen pantry in the rear wing. The interior is designed with the lines and moldings of the Greek Revival styling. The fireplace has a simple projecting mantel, and the walls are plain with plastered walls and cornice moldings. In adherence to fire code standards, the rear chimney was rebuilt, yet "accurately reproduces the large bake oven." The second floor is similar to the first floor except the rear rooms have been converted to bedrooms. Cleary believes that the boards used to finish the attic stairway and part of the attic may come from the replaced ell, which possibly was from a previous house on the site.

== Operation as a museum ==
After the deaths of the widows, the house was boarded up and repeatedly vandalized. The Town of East Lyme considered destroying the house for municipal purposes, but citizens successfully petitioned and restored it. The Smith–Harris House opened as a historic house museum on July 3, 1976. The restoration the addition of murals painted by the Connecticut Society of Decorative Painters in the style of Rufus Porter. The website notes that "[t]hese murals are meant to show visitors a decorative style that was available in the mid 19th century and not meant to be exactly what was in this house at that time." Currently, the Smith–Harris House Commission, created by the town to maintain the property, has incorporated the Friends of Smith–Harris House into the care of the property. The house is open from June through August and throughout the year by appointment. The Smith–Harris House was added to the National Historic Register of Places on August 22, 1979.

== Gallery ==
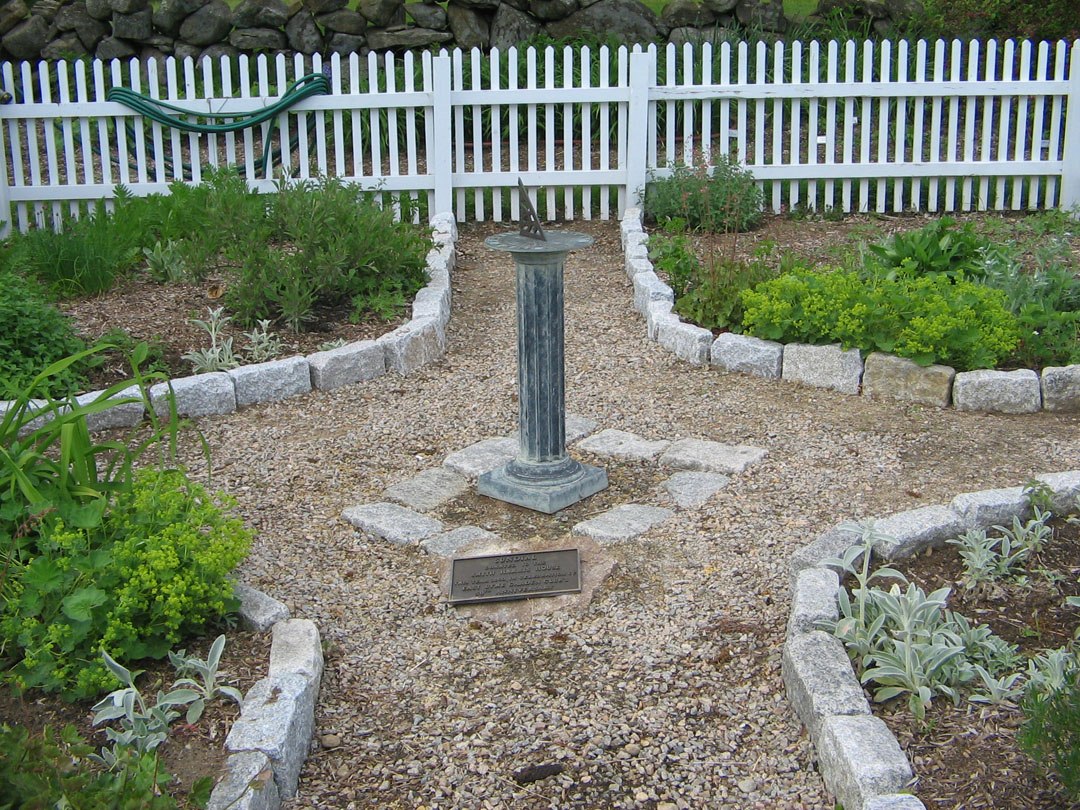
The herb garden behind house

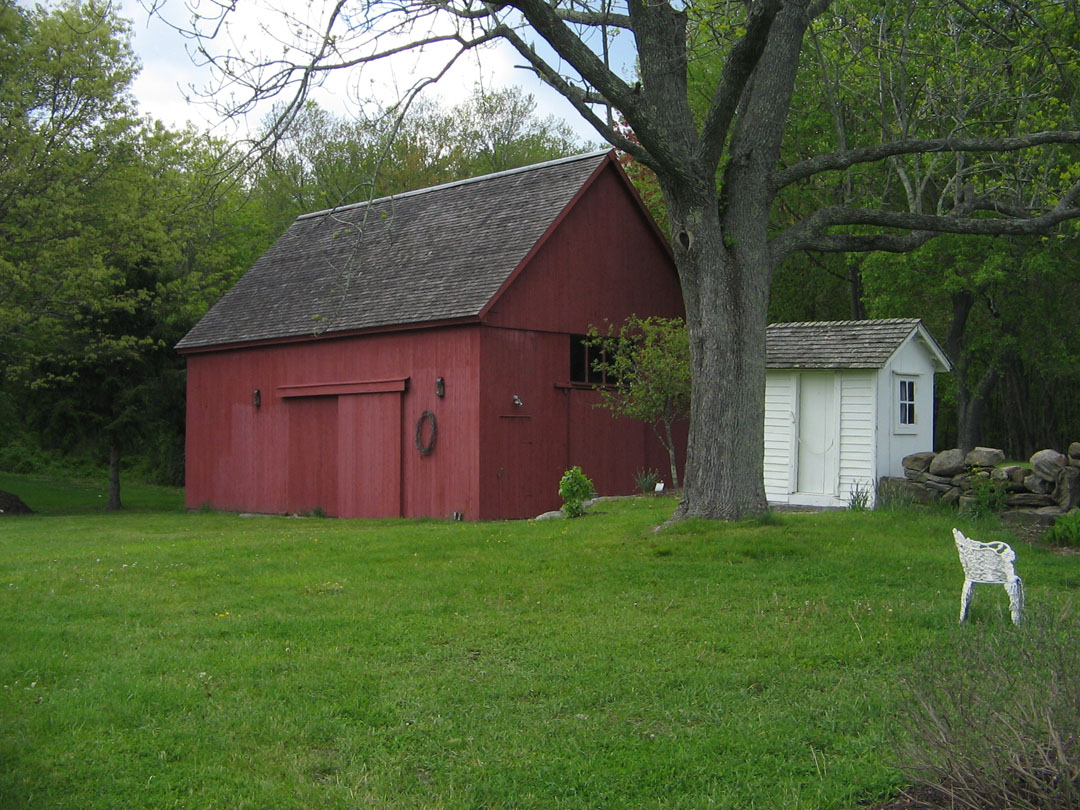
The barn behind house

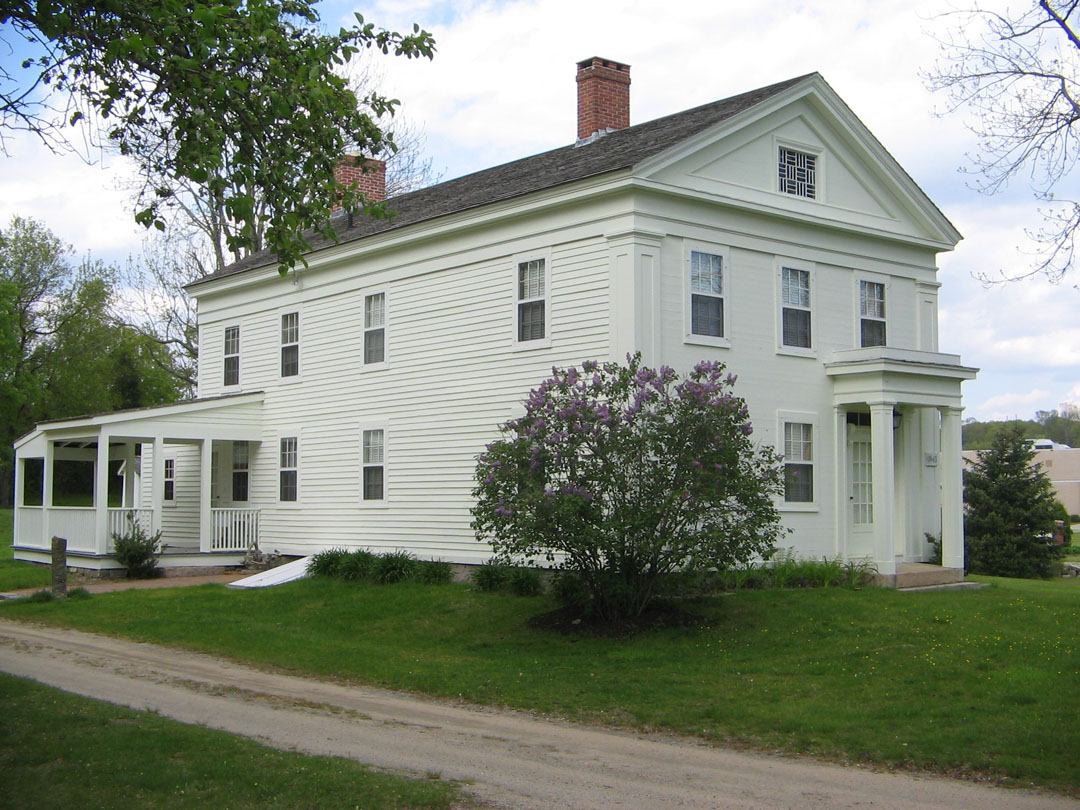
Another view of the house

== See also ==
- National Register of Historic Places listings in New London County, Connecticut
