= William Harris House (Brattleboro, Vermont) =

Historic house in Vermont, United States

- U.S. National Register of Historic Places
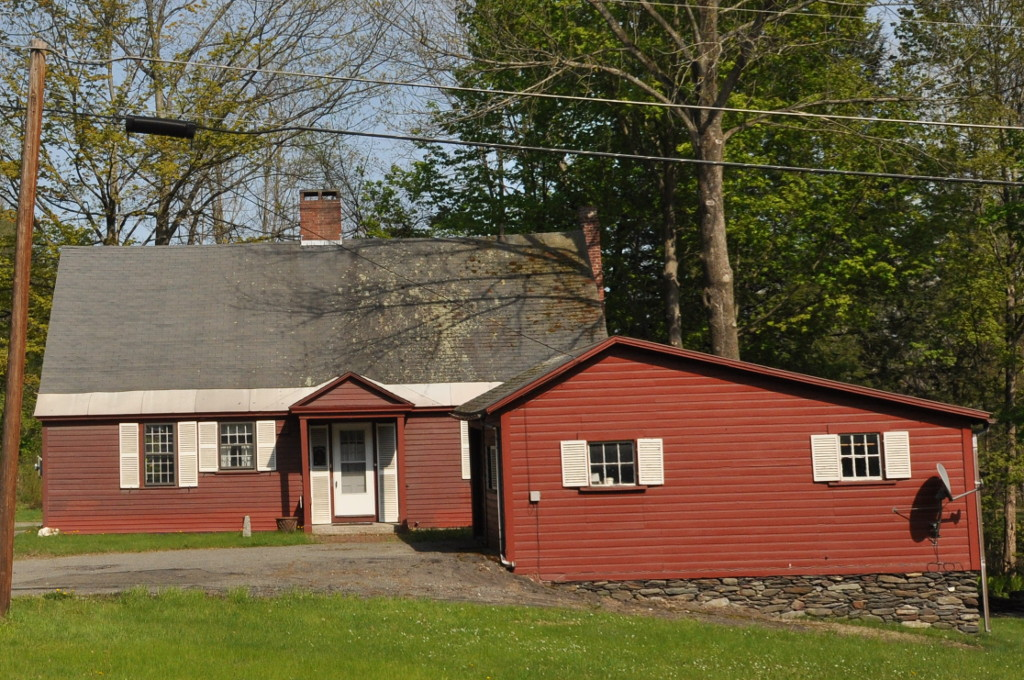

- Location within Vermont Location within the United States
- Location: Western Ave., Brattleboro, Vermont
- Coordinates: 42°51′0″N 72°35′18″W
- Area: 1 acre (0.40 ha)
- Built: 1768
- Architectural style: Cape Cod style
- NRHP reference No.: 78000250
- Added to NRHP: December 18, 1978

The William Harris House, also known locally as the Joseph Caruso House, is a historic house on Western Avenue in Brattleboro, Vermont. Built in 1768, this Cape-style house is believed to be the oldest surviving building in the town, and one of the oldest in the entire state. It was listed on the National Register of Historic Places in 1978.

== Description and history ==
The Harris House stands on the south side of Western Avenue (Vermont Route 9), just west of the Brattleboro Farmer's Market. It is a 1½-story wood-frame structure, with a gabled roof, large central chimney, clapboard siding, and stone foundation. It is set close to the road, with the roof gable perpendicular to the street, and the main facade facing west. That facade is four bays wide, with a roughly centered entrance flanked by two sash windows on the left and one on the right. The street-facing facade is three bays wide, and the east side, which was originally the front of the house, is five bays wide, with the central doorway replaced by a window. The interior of the building retains original floors, finishes, and hardware.

This house is reputed to have been built in 1768 (a date carved into one of its beams) by William Harris, a native of Holden, Massachusetts who was one of the first to settle the area that is now Brattleboro.

In 1952, Rick and Terry Martin worked for Mr. Caruso and remember the carving in the beam. One day Rick was up in the attic cleaning the accumulated dust and found a small wood sign with 1768 carved into it. Mr. Caruso had it mounted on the Avenue side for years.

The center-chimney plan Cape is a particularly rare building in Vermont, where most housing was built after the transition to smaller fireplaces and wood stoves. In the 1950s, this house was owned by Joseph Caruso, whose wife was a singer at the Metropolitan Opera in New York City.

== See also ==
- National Register of Historic Places listings in Windham County, Vermont
- List of the oldest buildings in Vermont
