= William Harris Homestead =

Historic house in Georgia, United States

- Harris, William, Family Farmstead
- U.S. National Register of Historic Places
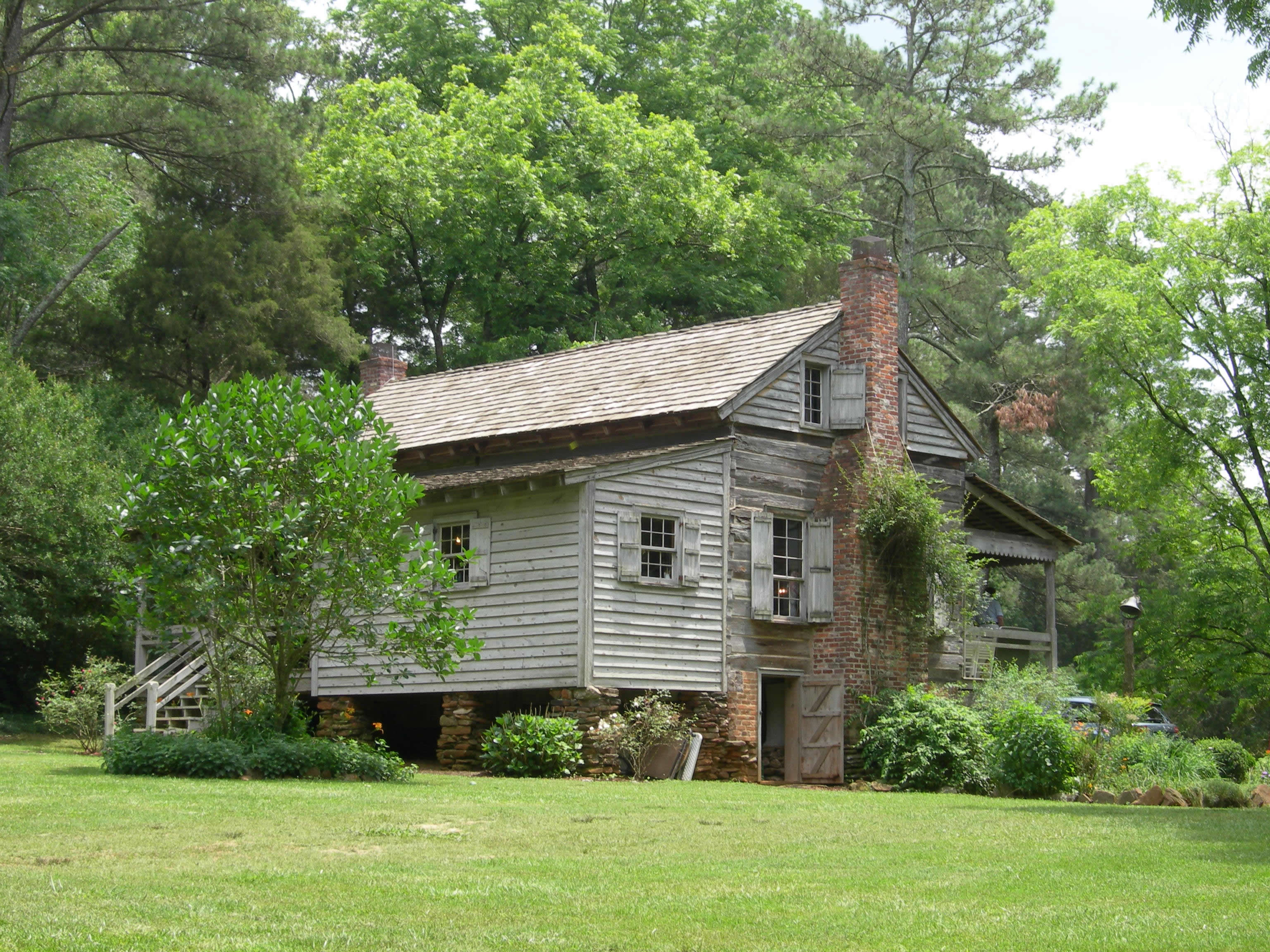
- William Harris Log House

- Location within Georgia Location within the United States
- Location: GA 11, Monroe, Georgia
- Coordinates: 33°53′38″N 83°43′23″W
- Area: 367 acres (149 ha)
- Built: 1825
- NRHP reference No.: 82002494
- Added to NRHP: June 22, 1982

The William Harris Homestead, in Monroe, Georgia dates from 1825. It was listed on the National Register of Historic Places (NRHP) in 1982. Its NRHP listing was for a 367 acres (149 ha) property that included a residential dwelling, agricultural outbuildings, agricultural fields, and secondary structure(s). Specifically seven contributing buildings and eight contributing sites are included.

It is listed for architectural criteria.

The William Harris Homestead webpage describes it as being located in Monroe, Georgia, but its location appears to be about one mile north of the small community of Campton. Monroe is a larger town about five miles further south of Campton.

The William Harris Homestead Foundation, a charitable 501(c)3 organization, manages the property and conducts public tours and events including school field trips.
