= National Register of Historic Places listings in Wasatch County, Utah =

Location of Wasatch County in Utah

Wasatch County, Utah, United States, has 36 properties and districts listed on the National Register of Historic Places. Another three properties were once listed on the Register but have been removed.

Latitude and longitude coordinates are provided for many National Register properties and districts; these locations may be seen together in a map.

This National Park Service list is complete through NPS recent listings posted November 13, 2026.

== Current listings ==
	Name on the Register	Image	Date listed	Location	City or town	Description
1	Austin–Wherritt House	Austin–Wherritt House	January 25, 1979 (#79002520)	315 E. Center St. 40°30′28″N 111°24′25″W	Heber City	
2	George Blackley House	George Blackley House	June 27, 1985 (#85001392)	421 E. 200 North; 40°30′38″N 111°24′19″W	Heber City	
3	George Bonner Jr. House	George Bonner Jr. House	June 17, 1986 (#86001357)	90 E. Main St. 40°30′43″N 111°28′11″W	Midway	Designed and built by John Watkins
4	George Bonner Sr. House	George Bonner Sr. House	June 17, 1986 (#86001359)	103 E. Main St. 40°30′44″N 111°28′09″W	Midway	Designed and built by John Watkins
5	William Bonner House	William Bonner House	June 17, 1986 (#86001361)	110 E. Main St. 40°30′43″N 111°28′09″W	Midway	Designed by John Watkins
6	John H. and Agnes Buehler House	John H. and Agnes Buehler House	March 22, 2019 (#100003529)	806 N. River Rd. 40°30′48″N 111°27′49″W	Midway	
7	Burgener–Boss Farmstead	Burgener–Boss Farmstead	May 26, 1994 (#94000534)	102 W. 100 North; 40°30′51″N 111°28′32″W	Midway	
8	James William Clyde House	James William Clyde House	October 18, 1996 (#96001170)	312 S. Main St. 40°30′12″N 111°24′47″W	Heber City	
9	William Coleman House	William Coleman House	June 17, 1986 (#86001362)	180 N. Center St. 40°30′57″N 111°28′16″W	Midway	Designed by John Watkins
10	Heber and Matilda Crook House and Lake Creek Schoolhouse	Heber and Matilda Crook House and Lake Creek Schoolhouse	April 17, 1995 (#95000414)	4800 E. Lake Creek Rd. 40°30′00″N 111°20′20″W	Heber City	
11	John Crook House	John Crook House	November 16, 1978 (#78002705)	188 W. 3rd North; 40°30′43″N 111°24′57″W	Heber City	
12	David Fisher House	David Fisher House	April 16, 1980 (#80003984)	124 E. 400 South; 40°30′08″N 111°24′38″W	Heber City	
13	Levi and Ellen O'Neil Hancock House	Levi and Ellen O'Neil Hancock House	March 21, 2019 (#100003530)	304 East 100 North; 40°30′49″N 111°27′57″W	Midway	
14	Abram Hatch House	Abram Hatch House	October 10, 1975 (#75001832)	81 E. Center St. 40°30′28″N 111°24′42″W	Heber City	
15	Heber Second Ward Meetinghouse	Heber Second Ward Meetinghouse	December 12, 1978 (#78002706)	1st West and Center Sts. 40°30′26″N 111°24′51″W	Heber City	
16	Lester F. and Margaret Stewart Hewlett Ranch House		May 23, 1985 (#85001134)	Off State Route 35; 40°34′45″N 111°07′34″W	Woodland vicinity	
17	John Huber House and Creamery	John Huber House and Creamery	August 11, 1988 (#88001182)	Off Snake Creek Canyon Rd. 40°32′31″N 111°29′53″W	Midway	Part of Wasatch Mountain State Park
18	Midway Social Hall	Midway Social Hall	August 10, 1995 (#95000981)	71 E. Main St. 40°30′45″N 111°28′13″W	Midway	
19	Midway Town Hall	Midway Town Hall	December 1, 1994 (#94001347)	120 W. Main St. 40°30′45″N 111°28′48″W	Midway	
20	John Murdoch House	John Murdoch House	February 28, 1980 (#80003985)	261 N. 400 West; 40°30′40″N 111°25′12″W	Heber City	
21	Joseph S. Murdock House	Joseph S. Murdock House	May 1, 1987 (#87000701)	115 E. 300 North; 40°30′42″N 111°24′38″W	Heber City	
22	Schneitter Hotel	Schneitter Hotel	December 17, 1992 (#92001691)	700 N. Homestead Dr. 40°31′22″N 111°29′03″W	Midway	
23	Snake Creek Hydroelectric Power Plant Historic District	Snake Creek Hydroelectric Power Plant Historic District	April 21, 1989 (#89000279)	Snake Creek Canyon Rd. 40°33′20″N 111°31′12″W	Midway	Part of Wasatch Mountain State Park
24	Stewart Ranch Foreman's House		May 23, 1985 (#85001135)	Off State Route 35; 40°33′28″N 111°08′06″W	Woodland vicinity	
25	Barnard J. Stewart Ranch House		May 23, 1985 (#85001136)	Off State Route 35; 40°34′00″N 111°07′57″W	Woodland vicinity	
26	Charles B. Stewart Ranch House		May 23, 1985 (#85001137)	Off State Route 35; 40°34′48″N 111°07′32″W	Woodland vicinity	
27	Samuel W. Stewart Ranch House		May 23, 1985 (#85001138)	Off State Route 35; 40°33′26″N 111°08′05″W	Woodland vicinity	
28	Stewart–Hewlett Ranch Dairy Barn		May 23, 1985 (#85001139)	Off State Route 35; 40°33′23″N 111°08′11″W	Woodland vicinity	Dairy barn built in 1934
29	Wasatch Saloon	Wasatch Saloon	September 23, 1980 (#80003986)	139 N. Main St. 40°30′34″N 111°24′47″W	Heber City	
30	Wasatch Stake Tabernacle and Heber Amusement Hall	Wasatch Stake Tabernacle and Heber Amusement Hall	December 2, 1970 (#70000633)	Main St. at 100 North St. and 100 West St. corners 40°30′32″N 111°24′50″W	Heber City	Wasatch Stake Tabernacle and Heber Amusement Hall
31	Wasatch Wave Publishing Company Building	Wasatch Wave Publishing Company Building	December 27, 1979 (#79002519)	55 W. Center St. 40°30′26″N 111°24′44″W	Heber City	Demolished in approximately 2000
32	John and Margaret Watkins House	John and Margaret Watkins House	June 17, 1986 (#86001364)	22 W. 100 South; 40°30′39″N 111°28′21″W	Midway	Designed by John Watkins
33	Watkins-Coleman House	Watkins-Coleman House	May 14, 1971 (#71000858)	5 E. Main St. 40°30′45″N 111°28′16″W	Midway	Designed and built by John Watkins
34	Ethelbert White and William M. Stewart Ranch House		May 23, 1985 (#85001140)	Off State Route 35; 40°33′29″N 111°08′05″W	Woodland vicinity	
35	Wilson House and Farmstead	Wilson House and Farmstead	July 3, 2007 (#07000667)	94 E. 250 North; 40°31′05″N 111°28′14″W	Midway	
36	Attewall Wootton Jr House	Attewall Wootton Jr House	April 10, 1980 (#80003987)	Approximately 285 E. Main St. 40°30′45″N 111°27′19″W	Midway	

== Former listings ==
	Name on the Register	Image	Date listed	Date removed	Location	City or town	Description
1	Clotworthy–McMillan House	Clotworthy–McMillan House	February 12, 1999 (#99000216)	March 26, 2018	261 S. Main St. 40°30′15″N 111°24′45″W	Heber City	
2	Cloud Rim Girl Scout Lodge		April 9, 1986 (#86000751)	February 1, 1995	Lake Brimhall; 40°36′07″N 111°32′20″W	Brighton vicinity	Destroyed by fire in November 1992. Rebuilt in 1999.
3	Midway School		March 29, 1978 (#78002707)	April 17, 1986	First N and First W	Midway	Severely damaged by roof collapse on March 11, 1984. Subsequently demolished.

== See also ==
- List of National Historic Landmarks in Utah
- National Register of Historic Places listings in Utah
