= Bonner House =

Bonner House may refer to, and George Bonner House may in some cases refer to:

- Bonner–Sharp–Gunn House, Carrollton, GA, listed on the NRHP in Georgia
- Bonner House (Bath, North Carolina), listed on the NRHP in North Carolina
- George Bonner Jr. House, Midway, UT, listed on the NRHP in Utah
- George Bonner Sr. House, Midway, UT, listed on the NRHP in Utah
- William Bonner House, Midway, UT, listed on the NRHP in Utah
