= Midway School =

Midway School may refer to:

- Midway School (Iuka, Mississippi), a Mississippi Landmark
- Midway School (Midway, Utah), formerly listed on the National Register of Historic Places in Wasatch County, Utah
- Midway School (Gig Harbor, Washington), listed on the National Register of Historic Places in Pierce County, Washington
