= Luginbill =

Luginbill is a surname. Notable people with the surname include:

- Al Luginbill (born 1946), American football coach
- Peter Luginbill (1818–1886), American politician and city founder
- Tom Luginbill (born 1974), American football player
