= Peter Luginbill =

American politician (1818–1886)

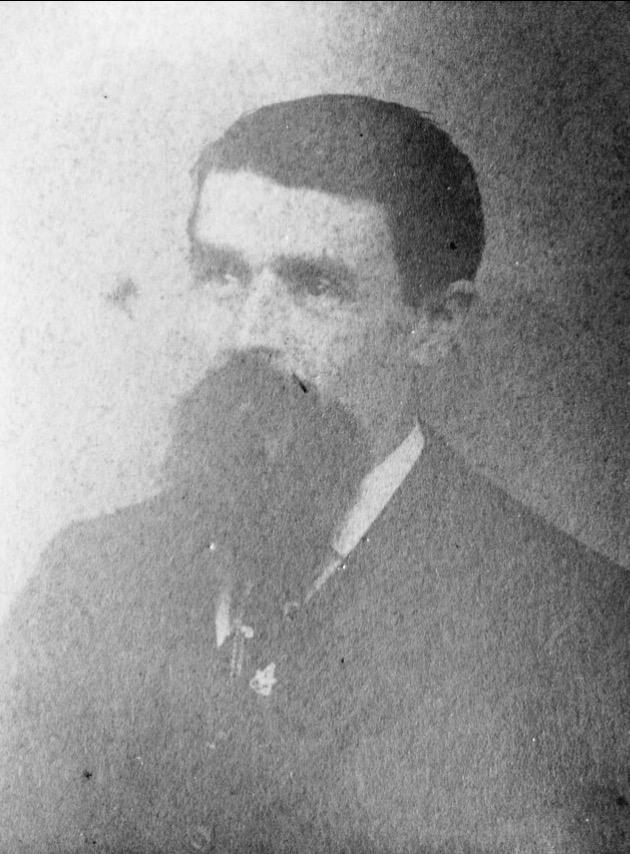

Personal details
- Born: February 1, 1818 Florimont (Blumenbergewald), Franche-Comté
- Died: October 18, 1886 (aged 68) Berne, Indiana, US
- Spouse: Barbara Steiner
- Occupation: Farmer, politician

Peter Luginbill (February 1, 1818 – October 18, 1886) (early spelling of Luginbuhl) was a Swiss-American politician, farmer, and carpenter. Luginbill was one of the first settlers and founders of Berne, Indiana.

== Biography ==
Luginbill was born in a Swiss settlement in Florimont (Blumenbergewald), Franche-Comté in 1818. In 1824, Luginbill and his family (who were Swiss Mennonites) fled from the Emmenthal to the Jura and to Alsace-Lorraine because of religious persecution. During the French occupation, Luginbill's family had retained his Swiss citizenship by concealing family records. Luginbill spoke both French and Swiss German.

Luginbill and his family emigrated to the United States and settled near Orrville, Ohio. Later, in September 1847, they moved to the area that would become Berne, Indiana, where they were early settlers and where Peter was a founder. The community was named after the capital of Switzerland. As a city father, Luginbill often performed the functions of teacher, preacher and judge. He was also an early town trustee and treasurer.

A skilled carpenter, Luginbill (as the name had come to be spelled) purchased 80 acres of land and built a log barn and a frame farmhouse in 1855. The home was insulated by using straw and mud between the logs. Luginbill also built the first Swiss Mennonite Church in Indiana during the same year.

== Family ==
Luginbill was the eldest son of Johannes Luginbuhl and Anna Bosiger. Johannes lived from 1778 to 1838 and his wife from 1777 to 1838. Luginbill married Barbara Steiner on December 1, 1838. She died in 1897. They had ten children.

== Death and legacy ==
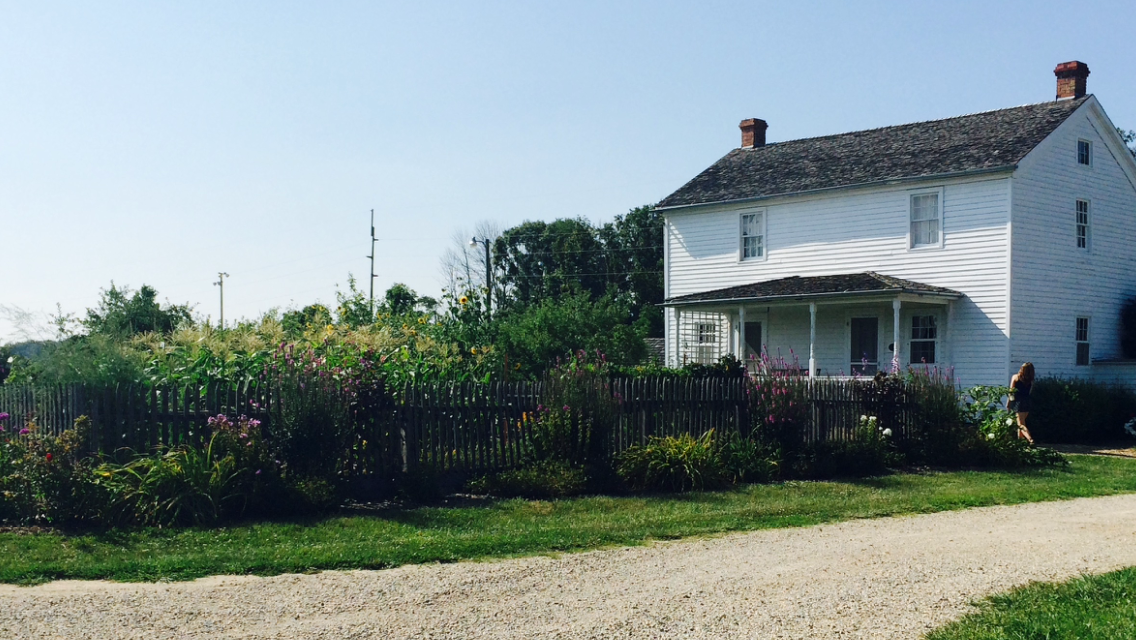
Photograph of the Luginbill House and garden at the Swiss Heritage Museum in Berne, Indiana.

Luginbill died in 1886. Luginbill and his wife are buried at Mennonite Reformed Evangelical Cemetery near Berne. Luginbill's farmhouse was donated to the Swiss Heritage Museum and moved to the property in 1987. The Luginbill House and heirloom garden is now available for public tours, and receives tourists from around the country and world on Swiss Days.

In 2010, Silvertowne of Winchester, Indiana, minted one-ounce commemorative silver coins honoring the Luginbill family and their contributions to Indiana.

The Luginbill family records and lineage are maintained by the Berne Public Library.
