= Abram Hatch House =

Historic house in Heber City, Utah, United States

- U.S. National Register of Historic Places
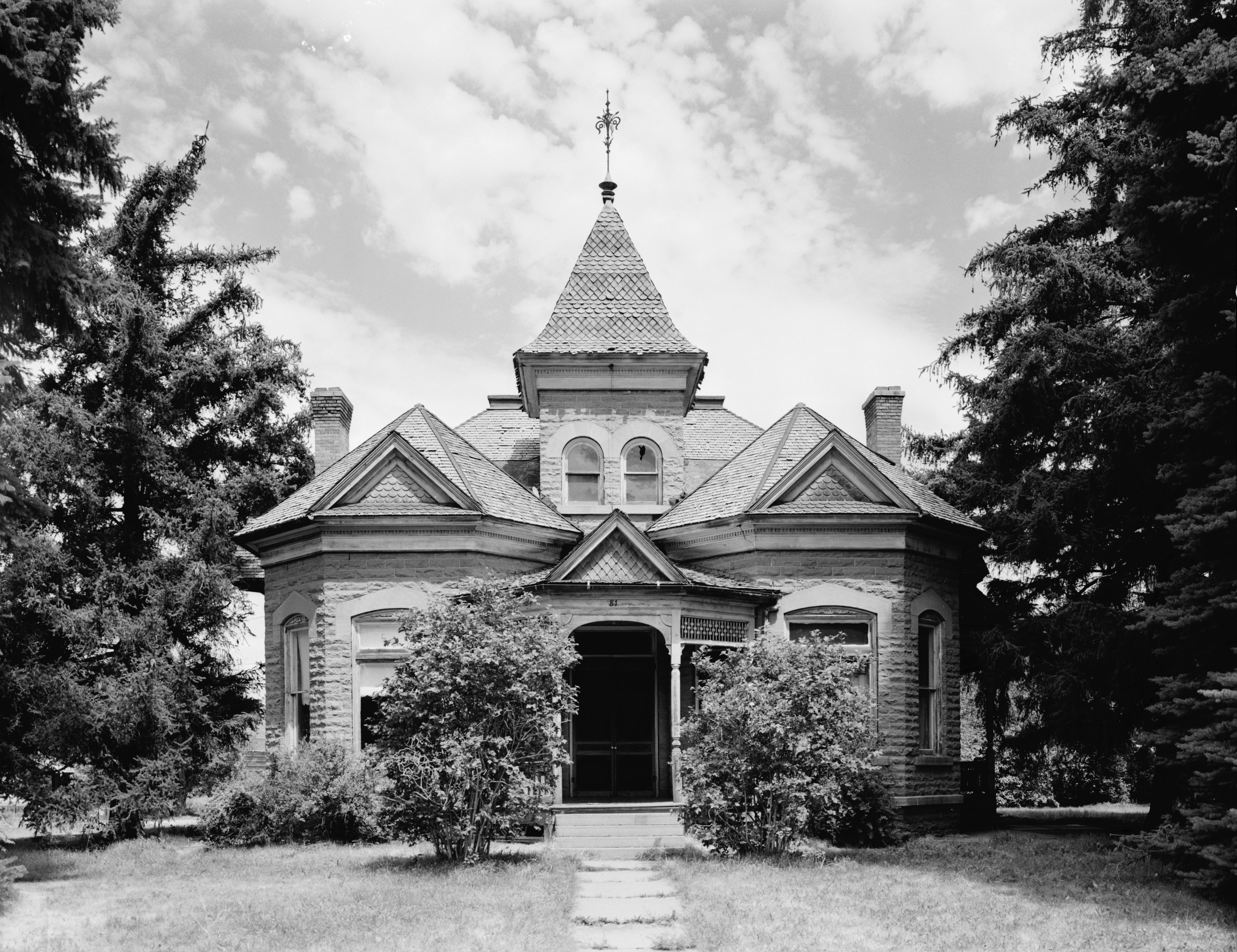
- Abram Hatch House, August 1973

- Location within Utah Location within the United States
- Location: 81 East Center Street; Heber City, Utah; United States
- Coordinates: 40°30′28″N 111°24′42″W
- Area: less than one acre
- Built: 1892
- Architect: Hatch, Abram
- Architectural style: Late Victorian
- NRHP reference No.: 75001832
- Added to NRHP: October 10, 1975

The Abram Hatch House is a historic residence in Heber City, Utah, United States, that is listed on the National Register of Historic Places (NRHP).

== Description ==
The house is located at 81 East Center Street and was built c. 1892 by Abram Chase Hatch, a prominent Mormon community leader. The Victorian style house features a complex roofline with a small tower over the entrance and two projecting bays in the front framing a small porch, all with small gables superimposed on the hipped bays. The 1 1/2-story house is built of red sandstone with extensive wood detailing, including wood spindles on the front porch. The interior features extensive wood trim, glazed doors and windows with colored glass panes.

The house is arranged with a center hall, entered through a porch in the indentation between the projecting bays. A parlor and an office flank the entrance, followed by a sitting room and a dining room which have projecting bays to each side, then bedrooms and a kitchen. A small rear wing comprises service rooms. The upstairs features sleeping rooms on either side another center hall.

The Abram Hatch House was listed on the NRHP on October 10, 1975. After being threatened with demolition in the 1970s, the house was restored by Zions Bank and used as a branch bank.

In 2023 the home was opened by the Encircle organization as a safe space for LGBTQ youth, being purchased from Zion's bank. After the opening of the home Encircle did little in the community to advertise their services. In July 2026, Encircle announced plans to close the home. A local fundraiser was started in an attempt to keep the home open to LGBTQ youth

== See also ==
- National Register of Historic Places listings in Wasatch County, Utah
