= George Bonner Jr. House =

Historic house in Utah, United States

- U.S. National Register of Historic Places
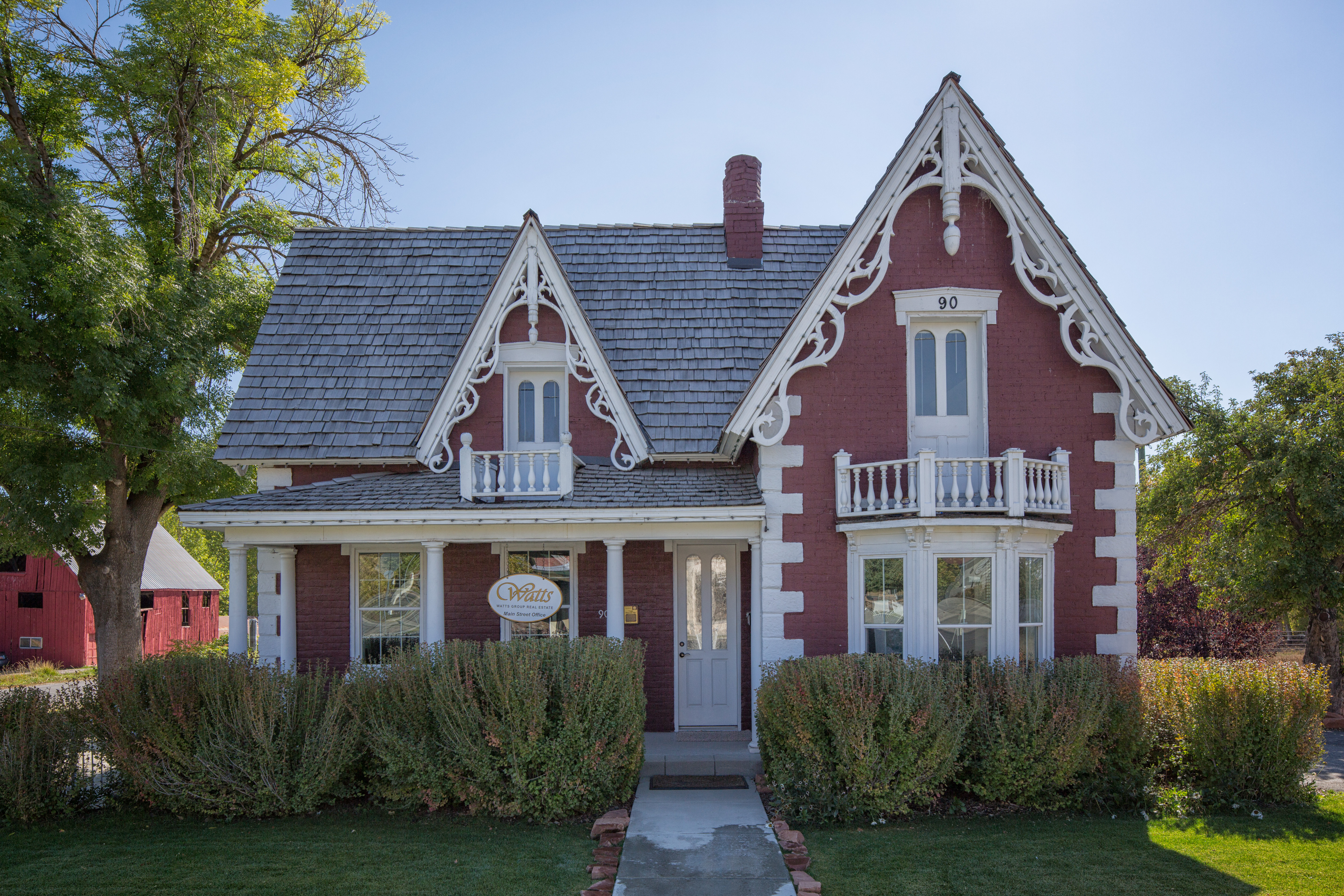
- The George Bonner Jr. House, October 2012

- Location within Utah Location within the United States
- Location: 90 East Main Street; Midway, Utah; United States
- Coordinates: 40°30′43″N 111°28′14″W
- Area: 0.8 acres (0.32 ha)
- Built: 1877, 1960s
- Built by: John Watkins
- Architect: John Watkins
- Architectural style: Gothic Revival, Cross-wing type
- MPS: Architecture of John Watkins TR
- NRHP reference No.: 86001357
- Added to NRHP: June 17, 1986

The George Bonner Jr. House is a historic residence in Midway, Utah, United States, that is listed on the National Register of Historic Places.

== Description ==
The house is located at 90 East Main Street (SR-113). It was built in 1877 and was designed and built by John Watkins. It is a one-and-a-half-story Gothic Revival-style house with decorative bargeboards. It has an L-shaped plan. A porch on the west side was replaced by a brick addition that served as a kitchen. A porch on the east side was enclosed to serve as an extra bedroom, in the 1960s. It has bay windows which originally had "fancy balconies".

It was listed on the National Register of Historic Places June 17, 1986.

== See also ==
- National Register of Historic Places listings in Wasatch County, Utah
- George Bonner Sr. House
- William Bonner House
