= George Bonner Sr. House =

Historic house in Utah, United States

- U.S. National Register of Historic Places
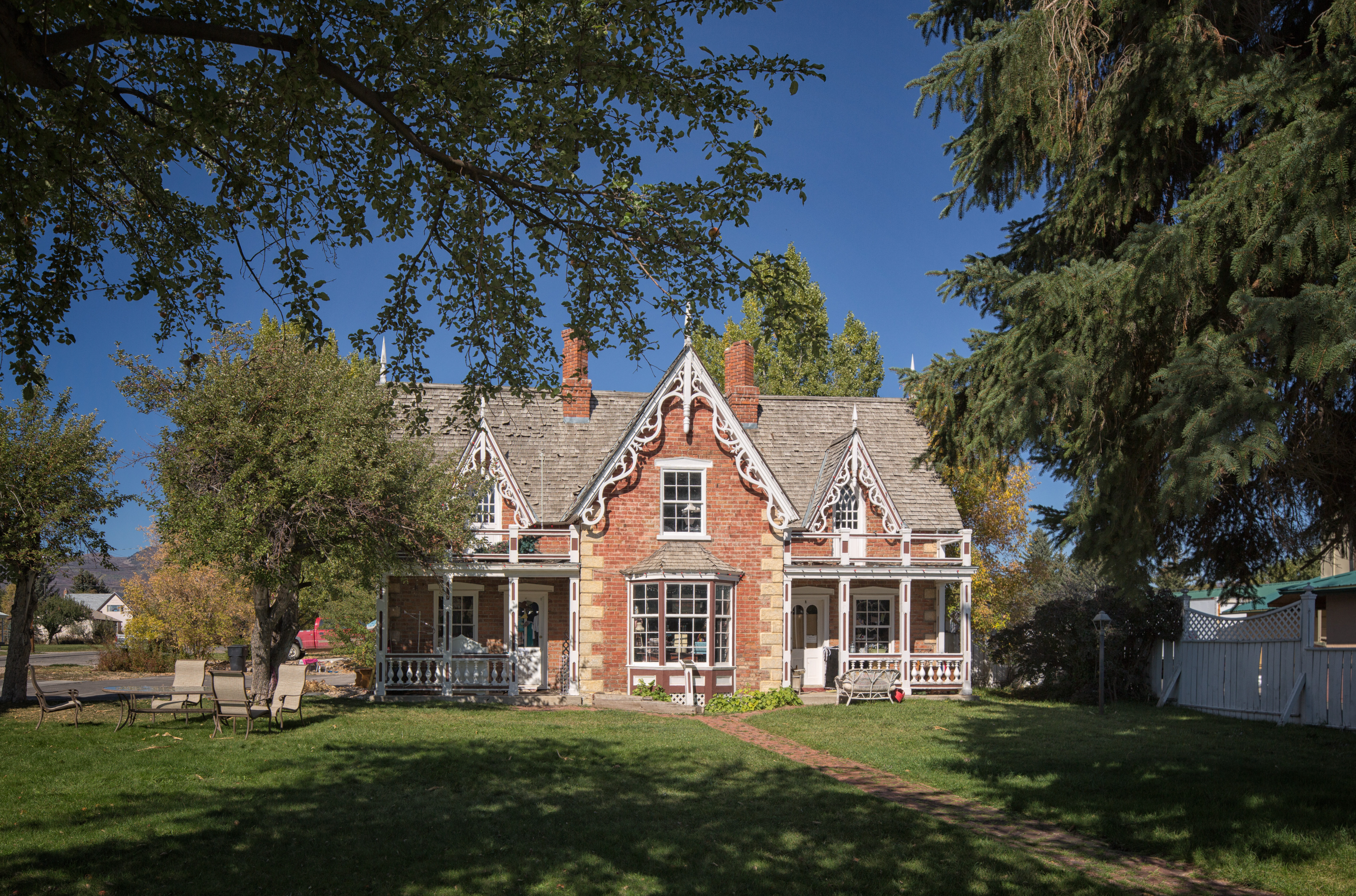
- The George Bonner Sr. House, October 2012

- Location within Utah Location within the United States
- Location: 103 East Main Street, Midway, Utah
- Coordinates: 40°30′45″N 111°28′12″W
- Area: 0.3 acres (0.12 ha)
- Built: 1876
- Built by: Watkins, John
- Architect: John Watkins
- Architectural style: Gothic Revival, Cross-wing variant
- MPS: Architecture of John Watkins TR
- NRHP reference No.: 86001359
- Added to NRHP: June 17, 1986

The George Bonner Sr. House is a historic residence in Midway, Utah, United States, that is listed on the National Register of Historic Places.

== Description ==
The house is located at 103 East Main Street (SR-113). It was built in approximately 1876 and was designed and built by John Watkins.

It was listed on the National Register of Historic Places June 17, 1986.

== See also ==
- National Register of Historic Places listings in Wasatch County, Utah
- George Bonner Jr. House
- William Bonner House
