= Ervin Inniger =

American basketball player

Personal information
- Born: January 16, 1945 (age 81) Berne, Indiana, U.S.
- Listed height: 6 ft 4 in (1.93 m)
- Listed weight: 190 lb (86 kg)

Career information
- High school: Berne (Berne, Indiana)
- College: Indiana (1964–1967)
- NBA draft: 1967: undrafted
- Position: Shooting guard
- Number: 24

Career history

Playing
- 1967–1969: Minnesota Muskies / Miami Floridians

Coaching
- 1978–1992: North Dakota State
- Stats at Basketball Reference

Ervin Lee Inniger Jr. (born January 16, 1945) is an American former professional basketball shooting guard who spent two seasons in the American Basketball Association (ABA) as a member of the Minnesota Muskies (1967–68) and the Miami Floridians (1968–69). After his two seasons in the ABA, he moved back to Minnesota and accepted the job as athletic director and men's basketball coach for Golden Valley Lutheran College. He coached five years at Augsburg College before accepting the head coach position at North Dakota State University. Since 2013, Inniger has been the head boys' basketball coach for Park Christian High School in Moorhead, Minnesota.
