= Joseph Nelson (architect) =

American architect

Joseph Nelson (January 24, 1876 – February 6, 1952) was an architect in Utah. He designed numerous buildings of diverse functions including homes, civic buildings, businesses and churches, some of which are listed on the National Register of Historic Places. Some of his more prominent existing designs include the Utah County Courthouse, the Heber Second Ward Meetinghouse, and the Box Elder High School Gymnasium which represent Neoclassical, Gothic Revival, and Art Deco architecture respectively.

== Personal life ==
Nelson was born in Mantua, Utah in 1876 to Danish immigrants. He received training in architecture in Pennsylvania around 1902. He lived most of his life in Provo, Utah. He is the father of another Utah architect Willard Nelson.

== Images of works ==
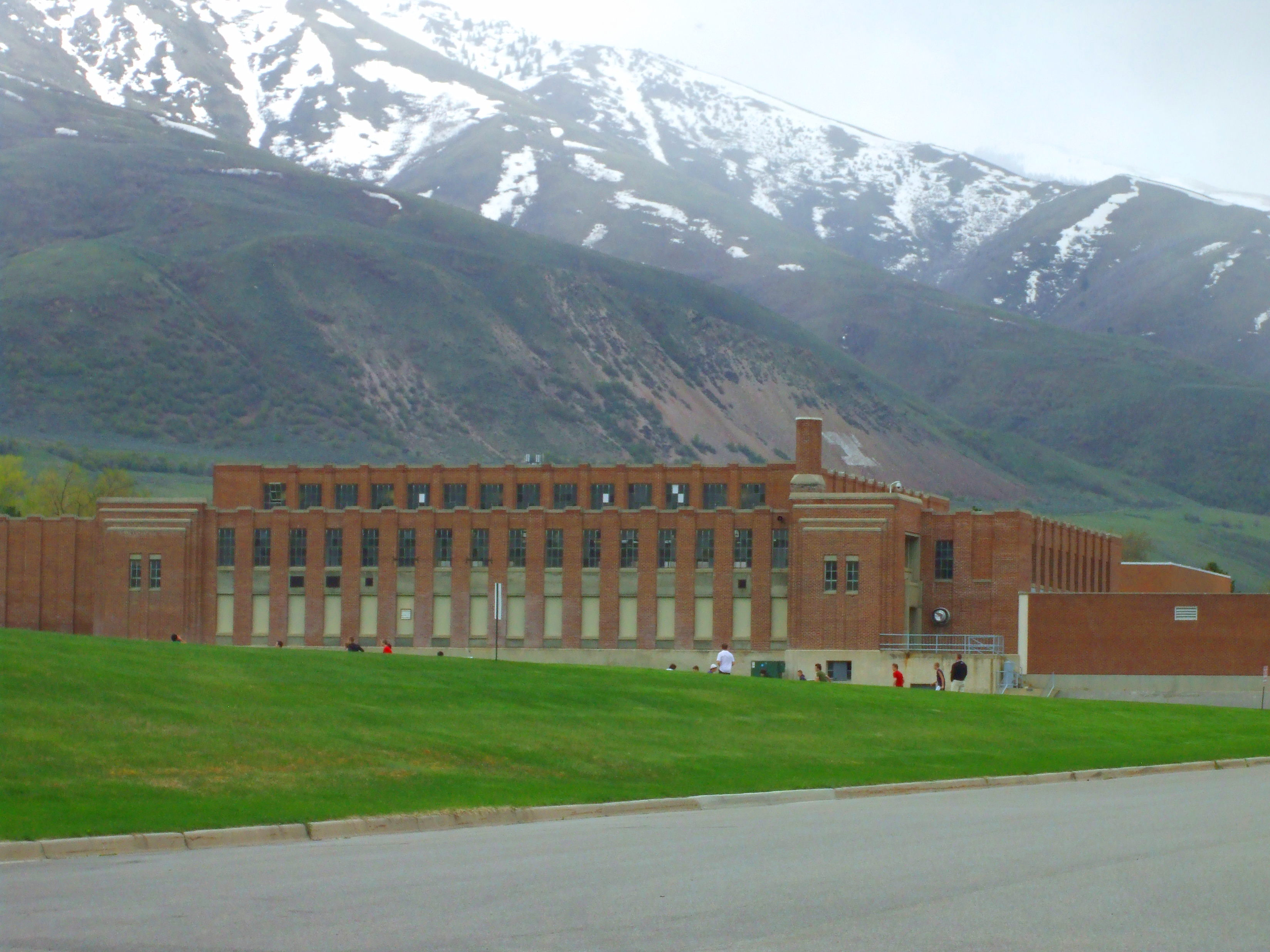
Box Elder High School Gymnasium

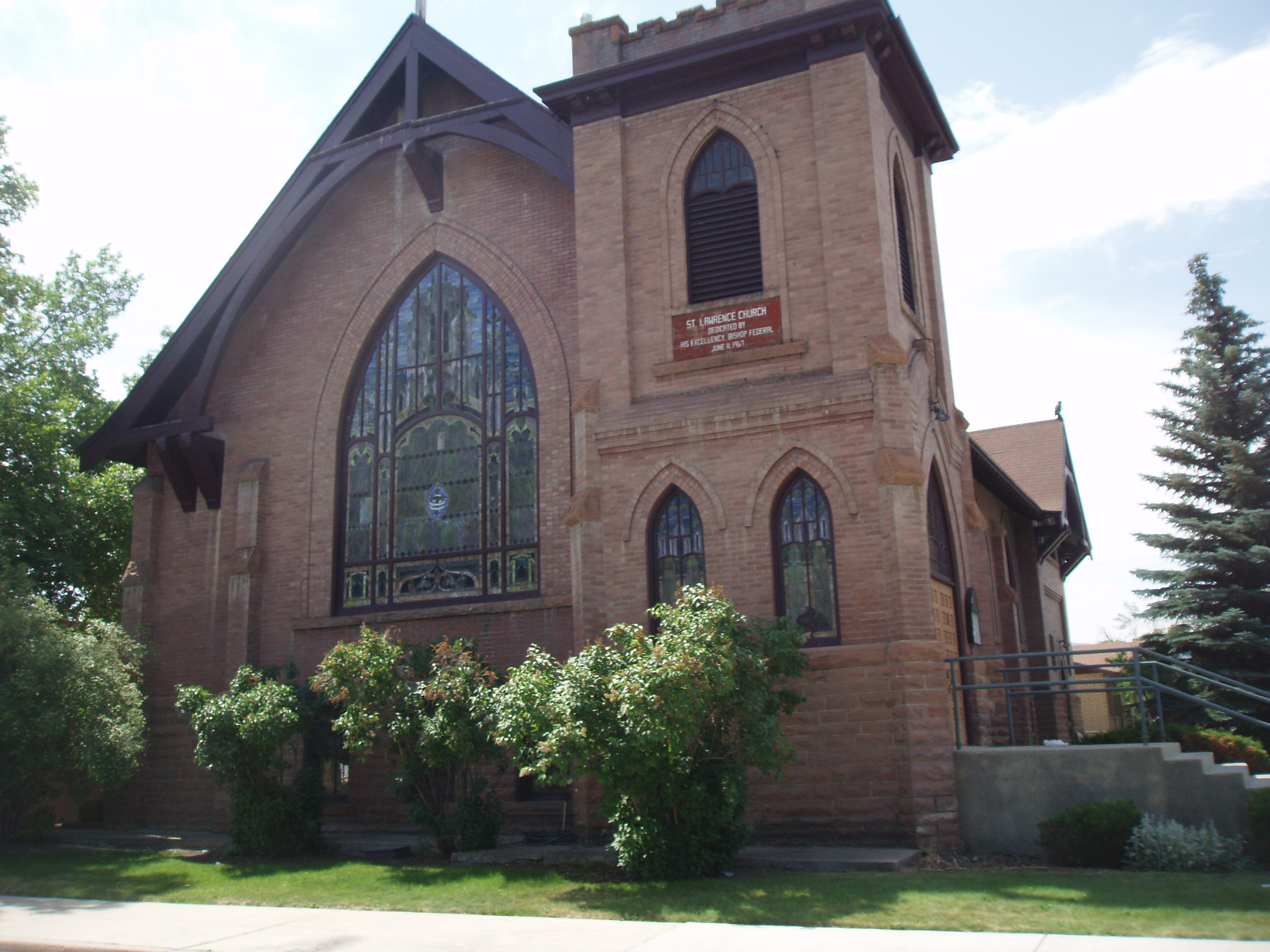
Heber Second Ward Meetinghouse
