= Wilson House and Farmstead =

- U.S. National Register of Historic Places
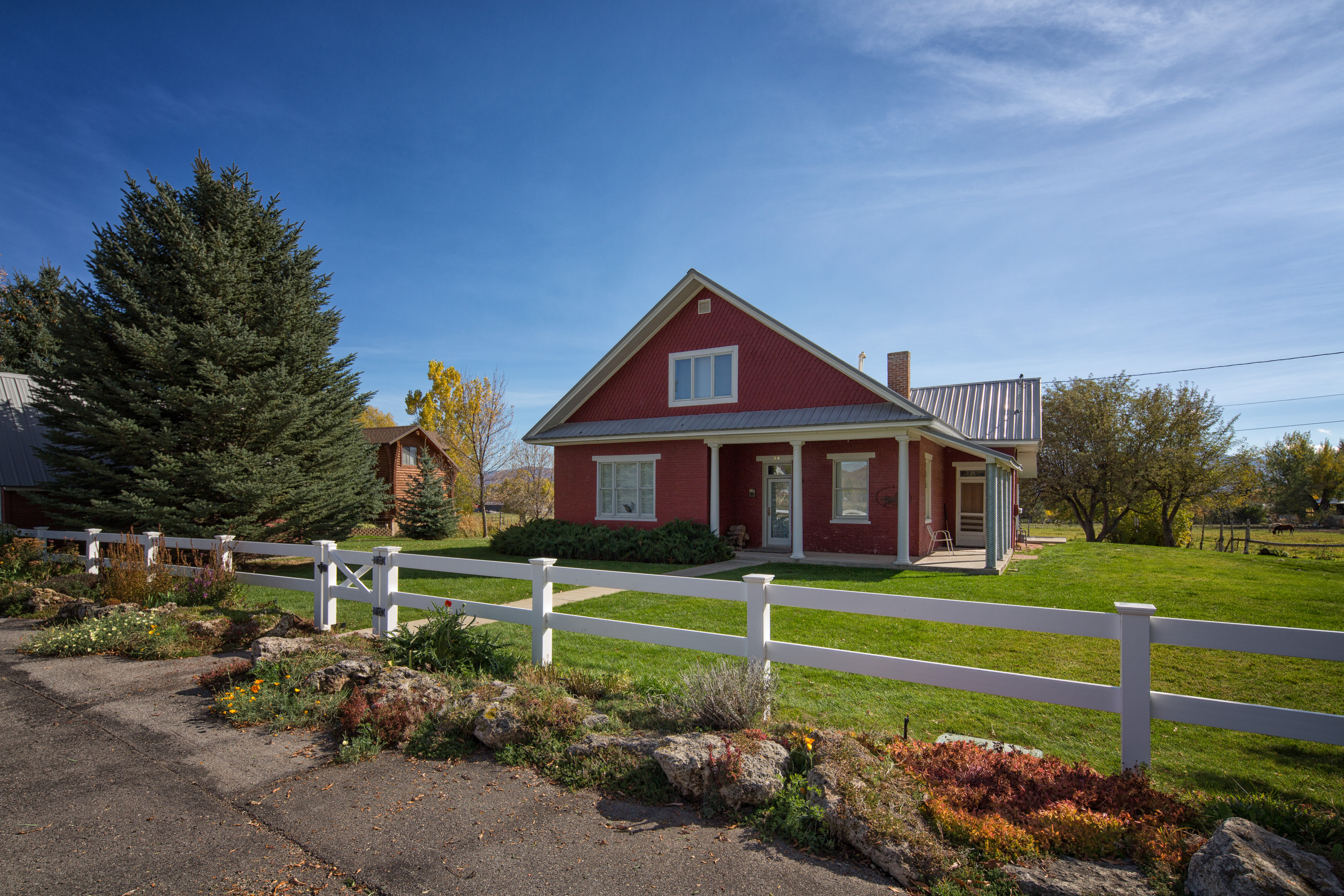

- Location within Utah
- Location: 94 E. 250 North, Midway, Utah
- Coordinates: 40°31′05″N 111°28′14″W
- Area: less than one acre
- Built: 1894
- Built by: William Walter Wilson
- Architectural style: Late Victorian, Late 19th and Early 20th Century American Movements
- NRHP reference No.: 07000667
- Added to NRHP: July 3, 2007

The Wilson House and Farmstead, at 94 E. 250 North in Midway, Utah, was built in 1894. It was listed on the National Register of Historic Places in 2007. The listing included three contributing buildings.

It includes a one-and-a-half-story brick house built upon a stone foundation in 1894. It was designed and built by William Walter Wilson as a Victorian-style cross-wing cottage. In 1915 addition to the rear and remodeling added Bungalow style. It was also remodeled during 1989 to 1991, which replaced a c.1920 sleeping porch by an enclosed back porch.

Also contributing on the property are a c. 1896 stone granary and a c. 1915 frame wagon shed/garage.
