= Schneitter Hotel =

- U.S. National Register of Historic Places
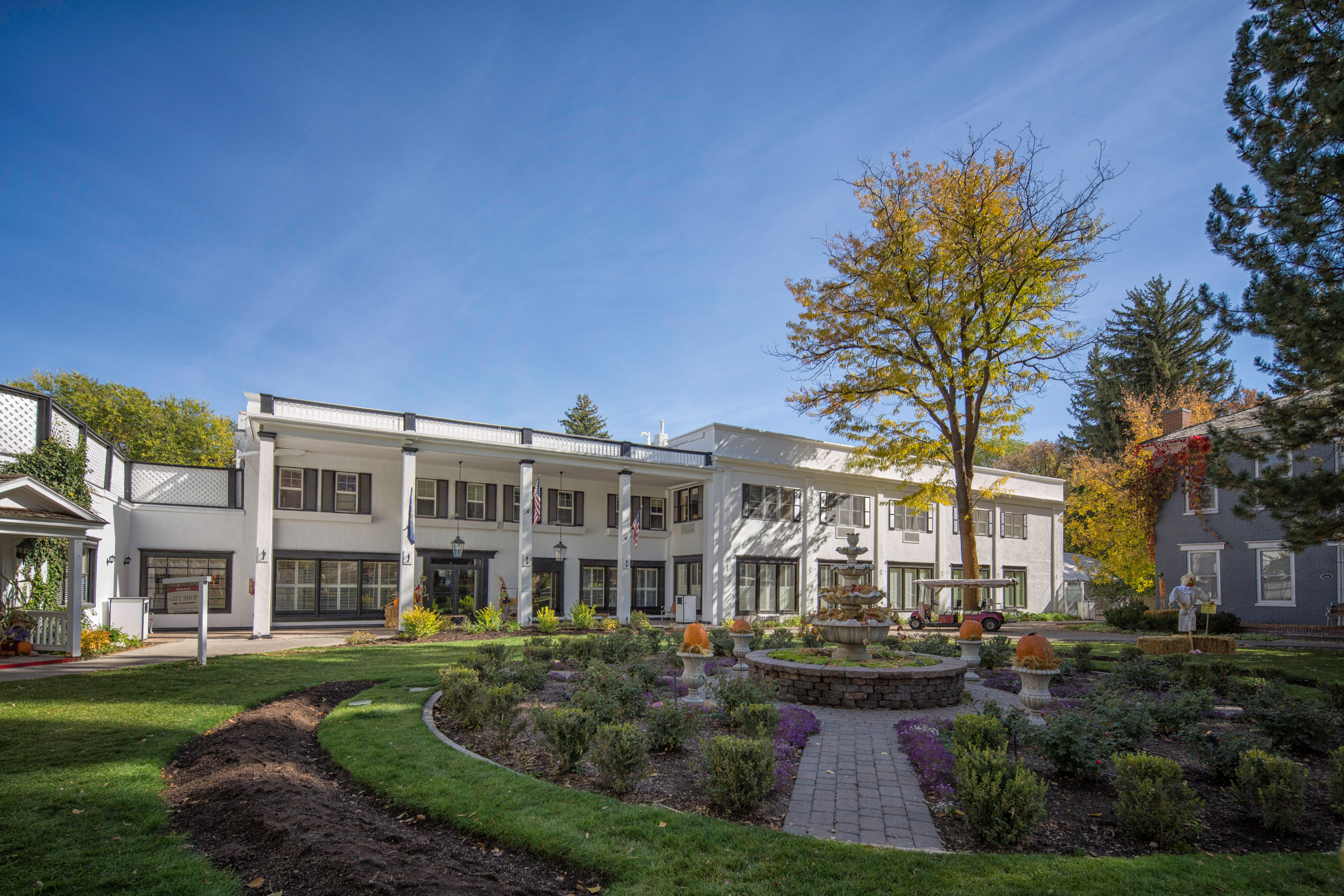

- Location within Utah Location within the United States
- Location: 700 N. Homestead Dr., Midway, Utah
- Coordinates: 40°31′22″N 111°29′03″W
- Area: 0.2 acres (0.081 ha)
- Built: c.1886
- Architectural style: Federal
- NRHP reference No.: 92001691
- Added to NRHP: December 17, 1992

The Schneitter Hotel, at 700 N. Homestead Dr. in Midway, Utah, was built around 1886. Also known as Virginia House, it was listed on the National Register of Historic Places in 1992.

It is a two-story central passage plan house with brick walls on a stone foundation, and is the only example of Federal style in the area.

It was built as the guest house and principal building of Schneitter's Hot Pot Resort, which later became the Homestead Resort. This "was one of the two most successful and long-lived of the several bathing resorts developed in the Midway area in the nineteenth century to take advantage of the natural hot springs, many of which are surrounded by large, conical mineral deposits, or 'pots.' The Schneitter Hotel is one of the few remaining historic buildings that represent the recreational industry that was important in the early (and current) economy of the area."
