= Swiss Days =

Swiss Days is the name of an annual festival that takes place in three American towns with Swiss heritage, Berne, Indiana, Midway, Utah, and Santa Clara, Utah.
