= William Bonner House =

Historic house in Utah, United States

- U.S. National Register of Historic Places
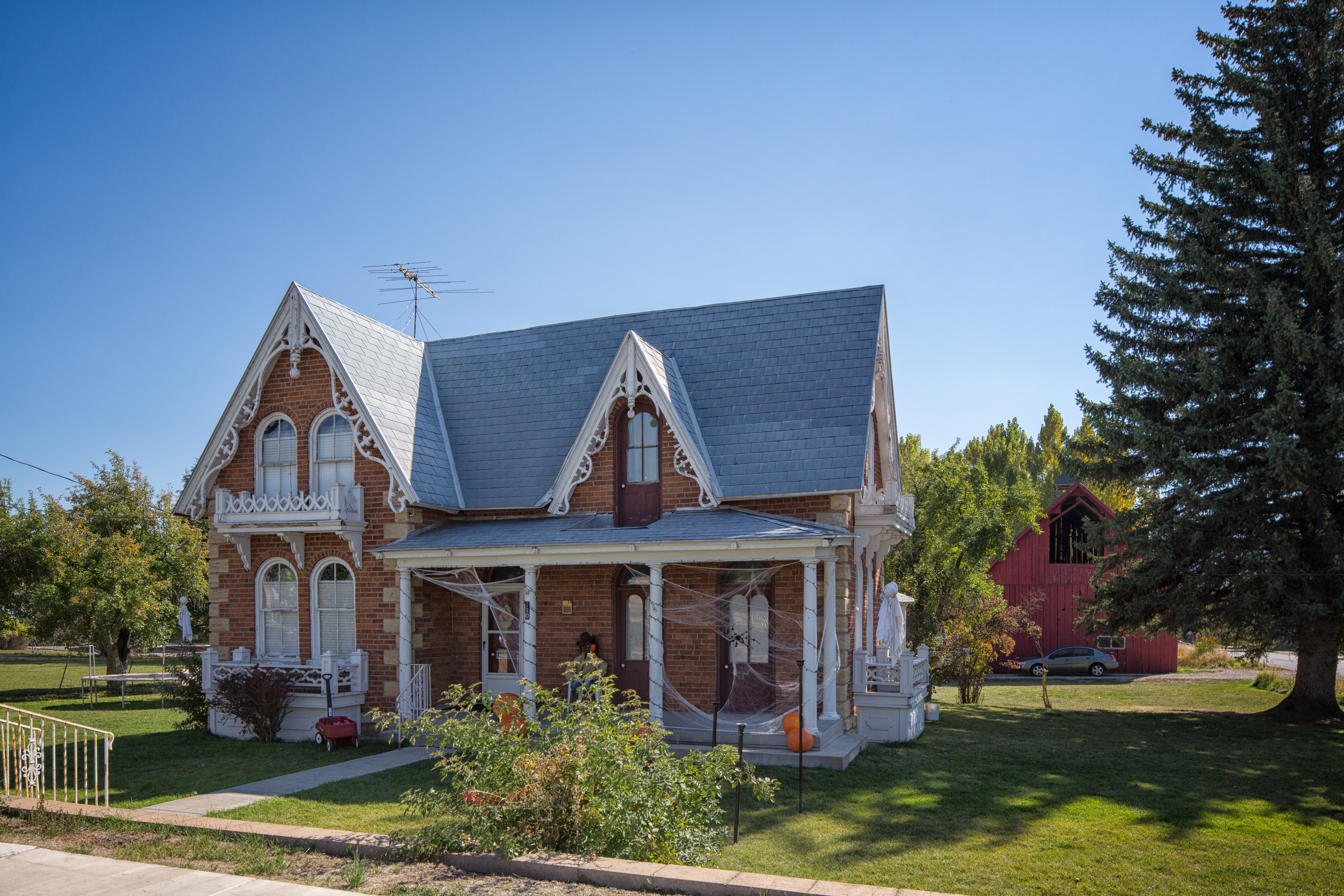
- The William Bonner House, October 2012

- Location within Utah Location within the United States
- Location: 110 East Main Street; Midway, Utah; United States
- Coordinates: 40°30′43″N 111°28′12″W
- Built: 1877
- Architect: Watkins, John
- Architectural style: Gothic Revival, Cross-wing variant
- MPS: Architecture of John Watkins TR
- NRHP reference No.: 86001361
- Added to NRHP: June 17, 1986

The William Bonner House is a historic residence in Midway, Utah, United States, that is listed on the National Register of Historic Places.

== Description ==
The house is located at 110 East Main Street (SR-113). It was designed and built by John Watkins.

It was listed on the National Register of Historic Places June 17, 1986.

== See also ==
- National Register of Historic Places listings in Wasatch County, Utah
- George Bonner Jr. House
- George Bonner Sr. House
