= Berne Witness =

The Berne Witness
- Owner: Muselman Family
- Founder: Fred Rohrer
- Publisher: Clint Anderson
- Editor: Manda Arnold
- Circulation: 1,600
- Website: https://bernewitness.com

The Berne Witness is a newspaper based in Berne, Indiana, United States. It covers local community news with a circulation of 1,600. The paper was founded in 1896 as a 3-issue-per-week, bi-lingual, Prohibitionist newspaper. The Berne Witness was also referred to as the official printing house of the Mennonite Church of the United States. Every issue had two pages published in German for the town's mostly Swiss and German immigrants. For the largest immigrant group in Indiana, this was important to help immigrants maintain their cultural identity while integrating into their new country.

== Founding ==
After purchasing an old Washington hand press and equipment from the Democratic Press and Decatur Democrat offices, Swiss Mennonite Fred Rohrer established the Berne Witness in 1896, with its first issue published on September 3. Rohrer served as editor of the paper and manager of its publishing office, Berne Witness Co., for nearly 30 years. Recognized as a Temperance paper, the Berne Witness began as a weekly newspaper and by the turn of the century had a circulation of about 700.

In 1900, Rohrer added a supplement German edition to the Witness, which was published every Friday. In the fall of 1901, the Witness switched to a bi-weekly publication, combining the German supplement with the English edition.

== History ==
Rohrer and the Witness played a crucial role in turning Berne into a "dry" city throughout the Temperance movement. It frequently reported updates on local Women's Christian Temperance Union's meetings and protests, alongside changes in Indiana's liquor laws and liquor license requirements. Rohrer, a member of Indiana's Anti-Saloon League, stated in the Witness in 1902 that Christian patriotic forces in Indiana were attempting to solve the saloon question by eradicating saloons all together, declaring, "The saloon must go." By the end of 1903, Rohrer was assaulted four separate times and his house bombed due to his Temperance connections. Rohrer and the Witness reported the closure of Berne's last remaining saloon and rejoiced when the last quantities of alcohol were carried out into the street and drained during the spring of 1907.

The Witness became a semi-weekly in 1912 after the Berne Witness Co. purchased a new publishing plant. By February 1915, Rohrer relinquished his control as editor, passing the torch to Carl T. Habegger, who served as editor for one year before giving the role to Ellis H. Sprunger. Under his leadership, the Berne Witness changed its name to the Adams County Witness, focusing on county-wide news, religious activities, and Republican Party politics throughout the 1920s. In, 1922 became the Adams County Witness, published by Berne Witness Co. the paper became English language only. Nearly every issue included daily sermons and Christian advice. By 1932, the Adams County Witness switched back to the Berne Witness.

After Rohrer's death in 1936, Roy O. Giord took over as manager of the Berne Witness Co., and Edward Liechty became editor until 1948. Later, under the editorship of Simon M. Schwartz, the paper became a daily publication, changing its name to the Adams County Sun and Berne Daily Witness (or the Sun-Witness) in September 1974, adding national news coverage and hiring more staff. The Sun-Witness was purchased by the Berne Tri-Weekly News, Inc. and their name switched to the Berne Tri-Weekly News in August 1976, reverting to a tri-weekly publication, except for Sundays. For 40 years, the Tri-Weekly News published less on conservative politics and more on community happenings.

== Current status ==
- In 2016, the paper reverted to its original Berne Witness name. It is once again published three times a week as well as online.
