= Mary Butcher =

American softball player

- Pitcher
- Born: October 12, 1927; Berne, Indiana, U.S.
- Died: October 2018 (aged 90–91)
- Batted: Right Threw: Right

Teams
- Kenosha Comets (1945); Grand Rapids Chicks (1946)

Career highlights and awards
- Women in Baseball – AAGPBL Permanent Display at Baseball Hall of Fame and Museum (since 1988)

Mary Butcher [Marsh] (October 12, 1927 – October 2018) was an American baseball player who was a pitcher in the All-American Girls Professional Baseball League (AAGPBL). Listed at 5' 7", 170 lb., Butch batted and threw right handed. She was nicknamed Butch.

Born in Berne, Indiana, Butcher began pitching softball at age 13. Following her graduation from Jefferson High School, she acquired a bit of experience while playing for the General Electric team in Decatur, Indiana.

After a game, Butcher was approached by a AAGPBL scout and later had a tryout in Chicago in front of league president Max Carey. As a result, she signed a contract and was assigned to the Kenosha Comets in 1945. Nevertheless, most of her time spent in the league involved her pitching batting practice.

In 1946 Butcher joined the Grand Rapids Chicks, but she continued pitching batting practice and played only one game. Then she decided to quit the league. Mary Alice Butcher married Jim Moser on 4 October 1946, in Adams, Indiana, United States. They were the parents of at least 1 son. In a two-season career, Butcher appeared in four games and posted a 0–2 record with a 3.19 ERA in 17 innings pitched.

After baseball, Butcher married Bill Marsh in 1955, and they raised three children. She ended playing softball in Geneva, Indiana later. Then they moved to Nevada in the 1960s, where she worked for a time as a medical records clerk in Carson Tahoe Hospital.

At age 40, Butcher continued playing softball for the Sprout Ritz in Carson City. She retired from Carson Tahoe Hospital in 1994, after three decades of service. After retiring, she spent time with her three grandchildren and went bowling.

In 1988, Butcher received further recognition when she became part of Women in Baseball; a permanent display based at the Baseball Hall of Fame and Museum in Cooperstown, New York, which was unveiled to honor the entire All-American Girls Professional Baseball League.

Mary died in October 2018.
