= Les Habegger =

Personal information
- Born: November 13, 1924 Berne, Indiana, U.S.
- Died: July 6, 2017 (aged 92) Spokane, Washington, U.S.

Career history

Coaching
- 1956–1957: Seattle Pacific (assistant)
- 1957–1974: Seattle Pacific
- 1977–1983: Seattle SuperSonics (assistant)
- 1987: Milwaukee Bucks (assistant)
- 1987–1990: Steiner Bayreuth
- 1991: Washington (assistant)

Career highlights
- As coach: BBL champion (1989); 2x German Cup champion (1988, 1989)

Lester Habegger (November 13, 1924 – July 6, 2017) was the general manager of the Seattle SuperSonics from 1983 to 1985. Before he joined the SuperSonics, Habegger became an assistant coach for the Seattle Pacific Falcons in 1956. As their coach from 1957 to 1974, Habegger and Seattle Pacific reached the quarterfinals of the 1965 NCAA College Division basketball tournament. Upon leaving his coaching position, Habegger had 272 wins and 176 losses.

For his NBA career, Habegger primarily worked as an assistant coach for the SuperSonics and the Milwaukee Bucks between 1977 and 1987. Habegger continued his assistant coaching experience with the Washington Huskies in 1990. Outside of the United States, Habegger coached in Germany from 1987 to 1990. With Steiner Bayreuth, his team won multiple German Basketball Cups and were fifth at the 1988–89 FIBA European Cup Winners' Cup. He was inducted into the Indiana Basketball Hall of Fame in 2014.

== Early life and education ==
Habegger was born in Berne, Indiana on November 13, 1924. He lived with the Amish and had nine siblings. For his post-secondary education, Habegger went to Northwestern College, Wheaton College and the University of Minnesota.

== Career ==
For his military experience, Habegger was part of the Battle of the Bulge. He worked with the 274th Infantry Regiment as a combat medic during the 1940s. After World War II, Habegger began assistant coaching for Northwestern College while completing his college education. Upon graduating, he became a basketball coach for the Seattle Pacific Falcons in 1956 as an assistant coach before being promoted to head coach in 1957.

As a member of the NAIA, his team did not qualify for the 1961 NAIA basketball tournament after they were defeated in the District I playoffs final that year. In the NCAA, Habegger and his team were part of the 1965 NCAA College Division basketball tournament and reached the quarterfinals. After leaving his coaching position in 1974, Habegger had 272 wins and 176 losses. With his wins, Habegger set a career record for Seattle Pacific University.

Outside of the NCAA, Habegger began working in the NBA as an assistant coach for the Seattle SuperSonics in 1977. While with Seattle, Habegger was selected to work for the Western Conference team at the 1980 NBA All-Star Game. He was promoted to general manager of the SuperSonics in 1983 and remained as GM until 1985. After his position of general manager ended, Habegger became the SuperSonics's Habegger director of player personnel in April 1985. He remained with the SuperSonics until 1986 and joined the Milwaukee Bucks as an assistant coach the following year.

From 1987 to 1990, Habegger was a coach in Germany as part of the Basketball Bundesliga league. Between 1988 and 1989, Habegger and Steiner Bayreuth won back to back German Basketball Cups. In 1989, Habegger and Steiner won the BBL championship. At FIBA competitions, his team was fifth at the 1988–89 FIBA European Cup Winners' Cup. Before ending his position in 1990, Habegger could not coach Steiner due to his injured back. That year, Habegger went to the Washington Huskies to become an assistant basketball coach. During the mid-1990s, Habegger decided not to resume his basketball experience in Germany when Steiner asked him to become their coach again.

== Personal life and death ==
Habegger had two children. He died on July 6, 2017, in Spokane, Washington.

== Awards and honors ==
Habegger was inducted into the University of Northwestern – St. Paul Hall of Fame in 2003 and the Seattle Pacific University Hall of Fame in 2004. He also entered the Indiana Basketball Hall of Fame in 2014.
