= Homestead caldera =

Thermal springs in Utah

Coordinates: 40°31′26″N 111°29′06″W

The Homestead Caldera, known locally as "The Crater" is a natural geothermal hot spring surrounded by a rock dome. It is located in Midway, Utah.

== History ==
The Homestead Caldera is estimated to be around 10,000 years old and is one of many geothermal hot pots in the Midway, Utah region. These geological features have attracted miners and workers passing through the area as a place of respite. What was once a refuge from a life of hard work in the 20th century has now become an attraction for snorkelers and scuba divers due to the perpetually warm water.

== Geology ==
The dome over the 90 degree water is 55 feet high and was created when the mineral-rich water deposited enough sediment over thousands of years to create the cathedral-like dome. Water pumps in through an aquifer with water heated by the Earth's interior at a rate of 135,000 gallons per day, keeping the water clean and warm. The influx of water also created the mound of tufa or travertine that has been built up by the flow of the mineral rich water. Studies suggest that rain and snow melt in the nearby Wasatch Mountains percolated into the ground, descended along cracks and fractures to depths of one to two miles to get heated and then returned to the surface and depositing that material as travertine. Travertine is mainly composed of calcium and produces an abundance of white, porous lava-like rock that is very common in the Midway area. The Homestead Caldera is the largest mineral dome in the area and is approximately 55 feet high and 400 feet wide at its base. The water in the crater is about 65 feet deep and an 8–14 foot deep layer of silt covers the bottom of the crater. There is an ongoing archaeological project that works to retrieve items from the silt that have been lost or thrown into the crater over hundreds of years, including firearms and coins.

== Water profile ==
The spring water emerges from the bedrock at 90 °F.

== Development of the site ==
It is now a commercial location open year-round to scuba divers and swimmers. Originally, it was accessed from a large natural opening at the top of the dome, but has since had a tunnel blasted through horizontally for easy access. Before the owners of The Homestead property decided to make the caldera more accessible, potential divers or mineral water soakers had to rappel through the hole at the top of the crater to access the water. In the 1990s a 110-foot tunnel was created on the north side of the rock formation. "The Crater" opened to the public on July 12, 1996.

== Filming location ==
"The Crater" was used in the 2010 Danny Boyle film 127 Hours as a shooting location. It was also featured in season 16 of the reality television show The Bachelor when bachelor Ben Flajnik and his date Jennifer rappelled down from the hole in the top of the dome down to the water below.

== Fatalities ==
In 2010, 26-year-old Patrick Vandam died during a six-minute freedive in the Homestead Caldera while training for the U.S. National Freediving championship. His family sued due to the fact there was no lifeguard on duty.
