= James William Clyde House =

- U.S. National Register of Historic Places
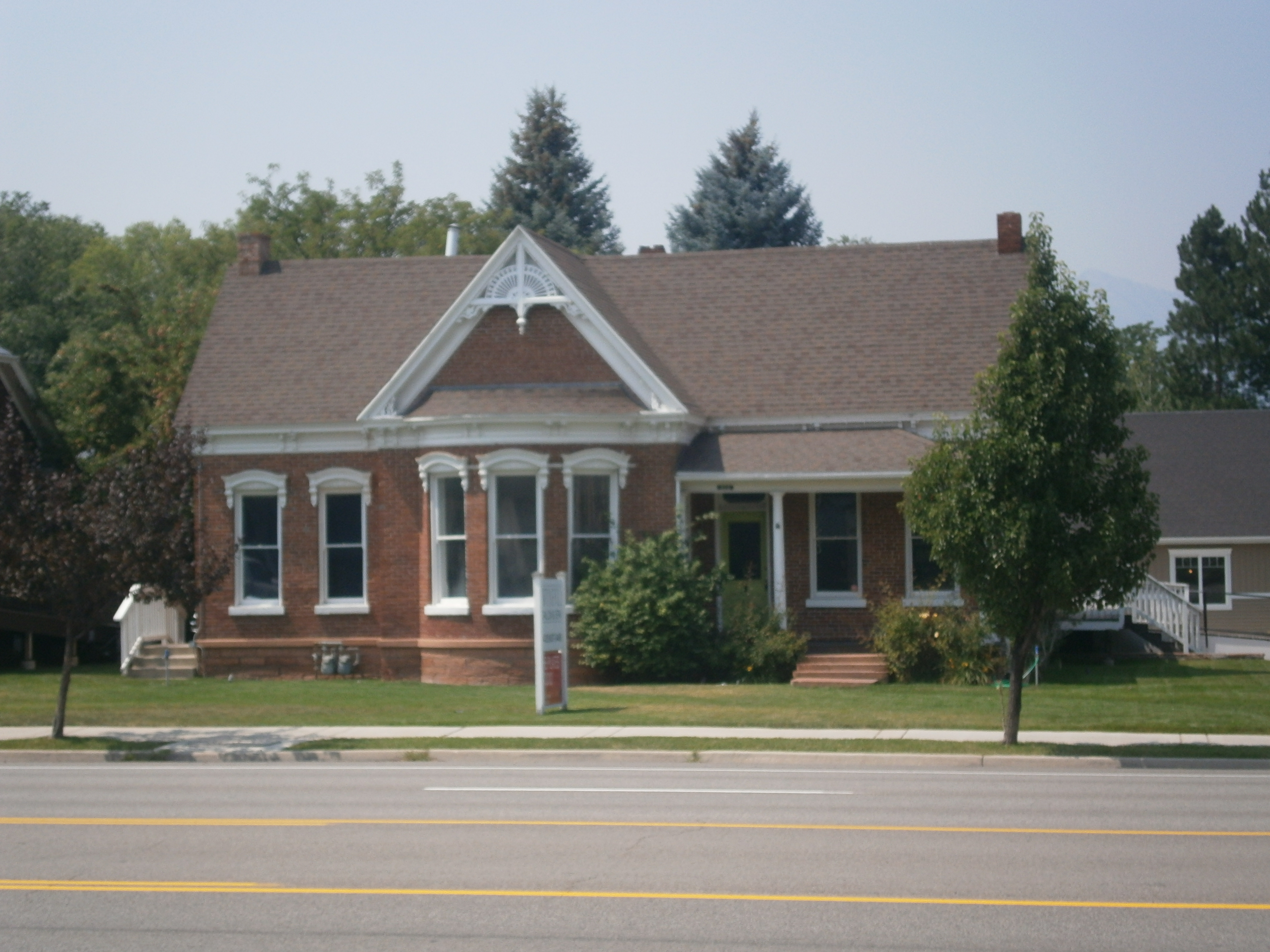

- Location within Utah
- Location: 312 S. Main St., Heber City, Utah
- Coordinates: 40°30′12″N 111°24′47″W
- Area: 0.3 acres (0.12 ha)
- Built: c.1884, c.1920s
- Architectural style: Late Victorian
- NRHP reference No.: 96001170
- Added to NRHP: October 18, 1996

The James William Clyde House, at 312 S. Main St. in Heber City, Utah, was listed on the National Register of Historic Places in 1996.

It is a one-story red brick house built around 1884. It was expanded with rear wooden additions around the 1920s. It has a modified cross-wing plan and has Victorian eclectic details.
