= Heber Second Ward Meetinghouse =

Historic church in Utah, United States

- U.S. National Register of Historic Places
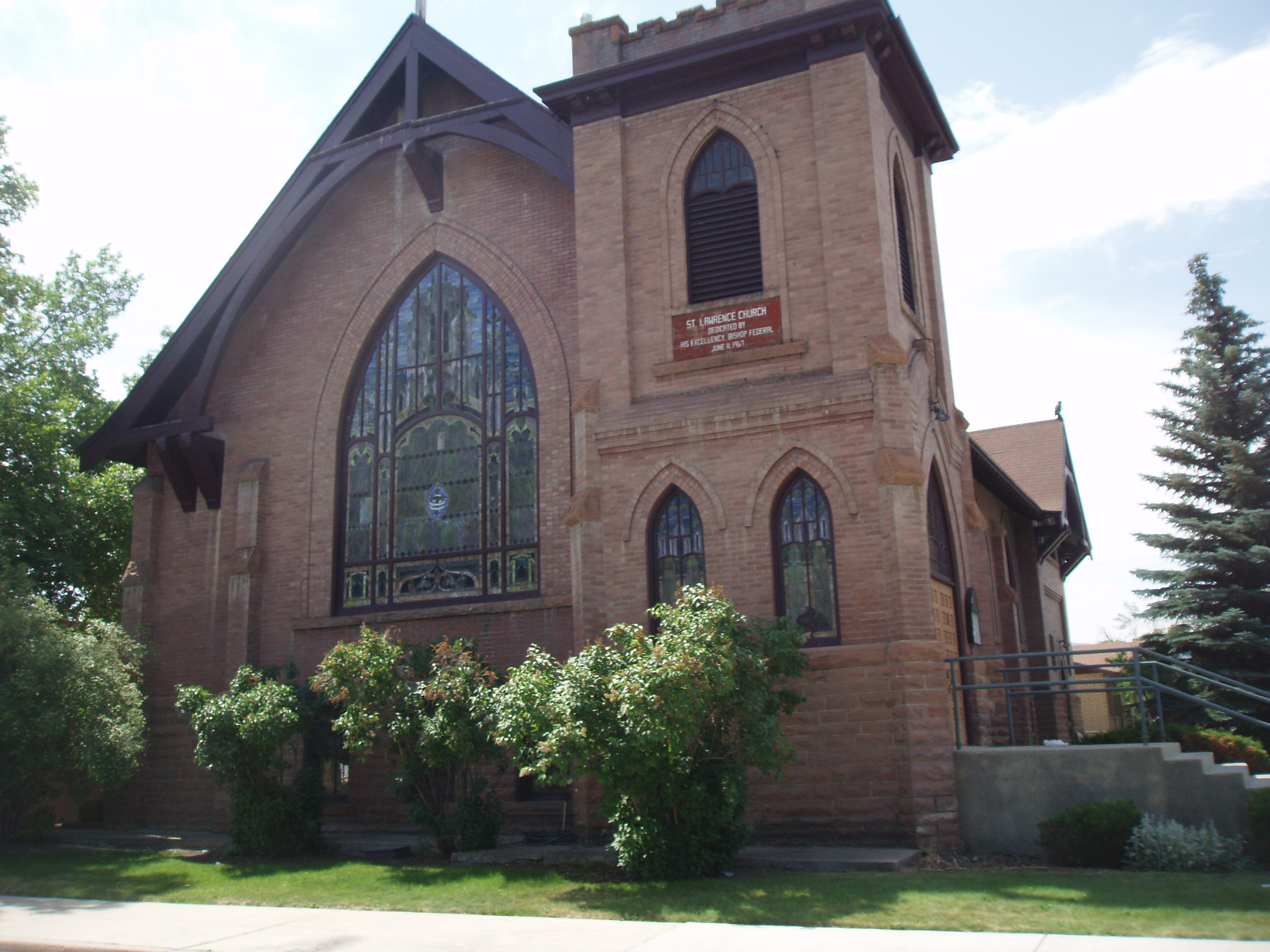
- The building is now St. Lawrence Catholic Church.

- Location within Utah Location within the United States
- Location: 100 W Center Street, Heber City, Utah
- Coordinates: 40°30′27″N 111°24′54″W
- Built: 1915
- Architectural style: Gothic
- NRHP reference No.: 78002706
- Added to NRHP: December 12, 1978

Built in 1915, the Heber Second Ward Meetinghouse, originally built as a place of worship for the Church of Jesus Christ of Latter-day Saints is of historical significance to Heber City, Utah. It was added to the National Register of Historic Places on December 12, 1978. Bishop Joseph A Rasband served as the Heber Second Ward's first bishop in the meetinghouse, and his first counselor James Heber Moulton was the superintendent that oversaw the building of the meetinghouse. Joseph Nelson was the architect. Construction of the building was begun 16 Mar 1914; it was dedicated by Francis Lyman on December 26, 1915 and served the Second Ward into the 1960s when it was sold. The building is now the St. Lawrence Catholic Church.
