= Berne, Indiana =

- City
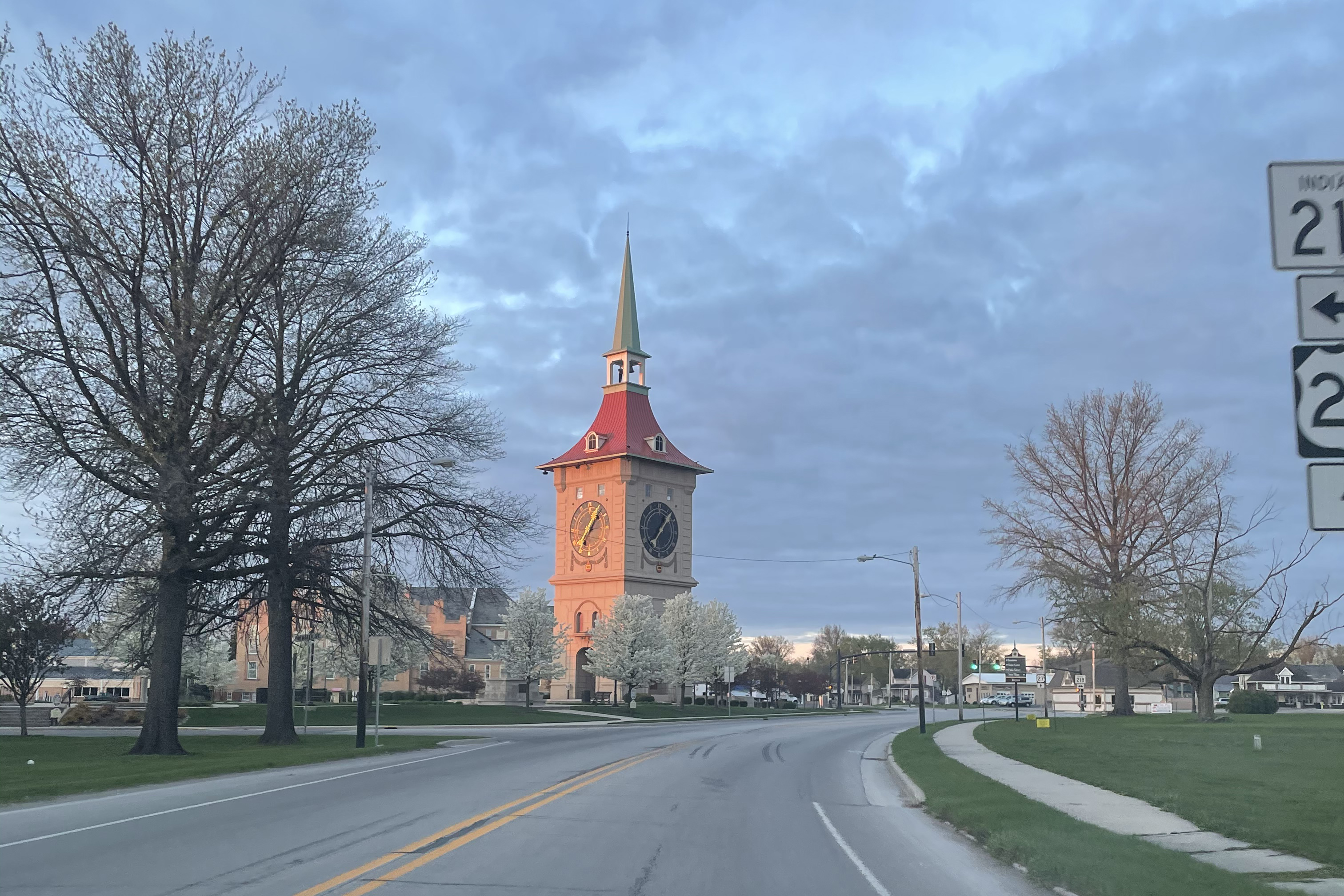
- Muensterberg Plaza & Clock Tower

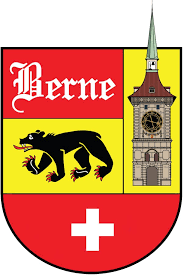
- Flag Seal
- Nickname: Furniture Capital of Indiana
- Location of Berne in Adams County, Indiana.
- Coordinates: 40°39′26″N 84°57′20″W
- Country: United States
- State: Indiana
- County: Adams
- Townships: Monroe, Wabash
- Founded: 1852
- Village plat recorded: 1872
- Incorporated (city): 1887
- Named after: Bern, Switzerland

Government
  - Mayor: Gregg Sprunger (R)

Area
  - Total: 2.33 sq mi (6.03 km^{2})
  - Land: 2.31 sq mi (5.99 km^{2})
  - Water: 0.015 sq mi (0.04 km^{2})
- Elevation: 856 ft (261 m)

Population (2020)
  - Total: 4,173
  - Density: 1,804.4/sq mi (696.69/km^{2})
- Time zone: UTC-5 (EST)
  - Summer (DST): UTC-4 (EDT)
- ZIP codes: 46711, 46769
- Area code: 260
- FIPS code: 18-04888
- GNIS ID: 2394149
- Website: www.cityofberne.in.gov

Berne (English: [bɜːn]) is a city within Monroe and Wabash townships, Adams County, Indiana, United States, located 35 miles (56 km) south of Fort Wayne. The population was 4,173 at the 2020 Census. Berne is widely known for its Swiss heritage, architecture and culture, and for its status as the "Furniture Capital of Indiana."

Berne and the surrounding area have also become known for their large Amish population (the fifth largest Amish community in the USA), who speak Bernese German (a Swiss German dialect), as opposed to Pennsylvania Dutch.

== History ==
Berne was settled in 1852 by Mennonite immigrants who came directly from Switzerland (Münsterberg, in the Jura Mountains near Moutier) and named the community after their homeland's capital. Berne initially formed around a rail depot placed on the Grand Rapids and Indiana Railroad lines. On Christmas Day 1871, the first train arrived at the local depot. A post office was established in Berne in 1872. After the population of the town exceeded 2,500, on a petition of two-thirds of the residents, the town decided to become a city in 1887. By 1895 the community was the second-largest city in the county.

The General Conference of the Mennonite Church has been held in Berne four times - in 1884, 1902, 1926 and 1947. The First Mennonite Church in Berne is the largest of its kind in North America, and previously had the largest congregation. It is affiliated with the Lancaster Mennonite Conference. The official publishing company of the General Conference Mennonite Church, the "Mennonite Book Concern," was located in Berne from 1884 until 1939, when it moved to North Newton, Kansas, which was the de facto seat of the Mennonite Church at the time.

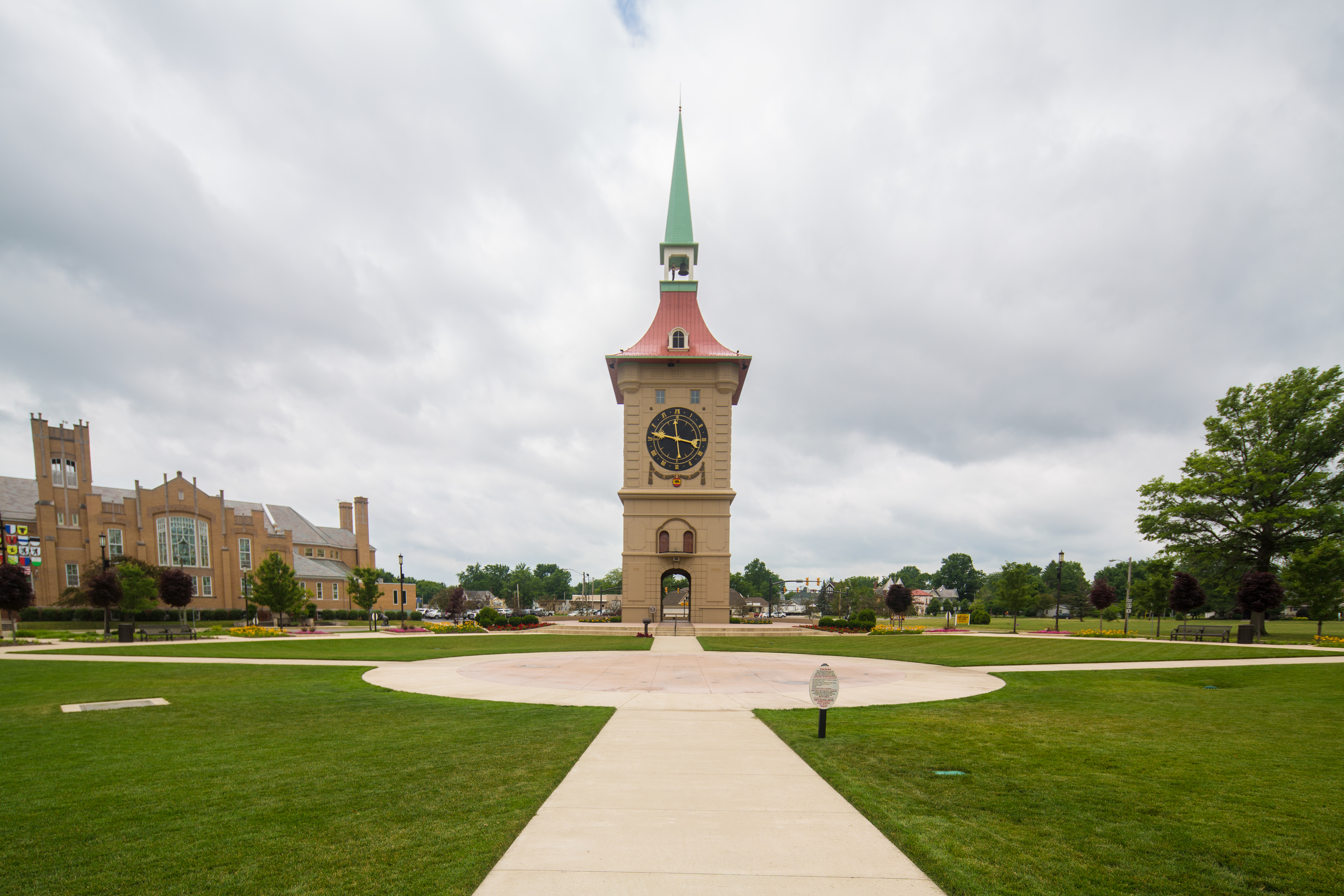
Photo from Small Town Indiana photo survey.

== Geography ==
Berne is located in northeastern Indiana.

According to the 2010 census, Berne has a total area of 2.08 square miles (5.39 km^{2}), all land.

=== Teays River ===
An ancient pre-glacial river known as the Teays River (about the size of the Ohio River), with its headwaters near present-day Blowing Rock, North Carolina, used to pass through Virginia, West Virginia and Ohio and run just east of Berne before flowing southwest through the present town of Geneva into Jay County. It then continued its course across Indiana into Illinois, draining most of the east-central United States. The glaciers of the last Ice Age (the Pleistocene) bisected the Teays River Valley and buried it underneath at least 400 feet of glacial drift (the largest remaining piece is the Kanawha River of West Virginia). Although the river does not flow anymore, the underground Teays River Valley still contains significant water deposits, making Berne and Geneva very water-rich areas. Wells just to the east of Berne provide the much larger city of Decatur (c.10 miles north) with a large proportion of its water supply. The current locations of many wetland areas, such as Limberlost Swamp Nature Preserve, Loblolly Marsh Nature Preserve, Limberlost Park and Rainbow Bend Park lie over the old Teays River Valley.

=== Climate ===
Climate data for Berne, Indiana (1991–2020 normals, extremes 1910–present)
Month	Jan	Feb	Mar	Apr	May	Jun	Jul	Aug	Sep	Oct	Nov	Dec	Year
Record high °F (°C)	70 (21)	74 (23)	86 (30)	90 (32)	99 (37)	104 (40)	107 (42)	105 (41)	101 (38)	90 (32)	80 (27)	72 (22)	107 (42)
Mean maximum °F (°C)	56.3 (13.5)	59.6 (15.3)	70.8 (21.6)	79.9 (26.6)	87.8 (31.0)	92.8 (33.8)	93.2 (34.0)	91.7 (33.2)	89.8 (32.1)	82.5 (28.1)	68.7 (20.4)	59.1 (15.1)	94.8 (34.9)
Mean daily maximum °F (°C)	32.8 (0.4)	36.4 (2.4)	47.4 (8.6)	60.6 (15.9)	71.5 (21.9)	80.5 (26.9)	83.6 (28.7)	81.8 (27.7)	76.3 (24.6)	63.8 (17.7)	49.5 (9.7)	37.7 (3.2)	60.2 (15.7)
Daily mean °F (°C)	25.3 (−3.7)	28.1 (−2.2)	37.8 (3.2)	49.7 (9.8)	61.3 (16.3)	70.7 (21.5)	73.9 (23.3)	71.8 (22.1)	65.3 (18.5)	53.4 (11.9)	41.0 (5.0)	30.7 (−0.7)	50.8 (10.4)
Mean daily minimum °F (°C)	17.9 (−7.8)	19.8 (−6.8)	28.2 (−2.1)	38.8 (3.8)	51.1 (10.6)	60.9 (16.1)	64.2 (17.9)	61.7 (16.5)	54.3 (12.4)	43.0 (6.1)	32.5 (0.3)	23.7 (−4.6)	41.3 (5.2)
Mean minimum °F (°C)	−2.4 (−19.1)	1.6 (−16.9)	11.8 (−11.2)	25.0 (−3.9)	36.5 (2.5)	47.4 (8.6)	53.6 (12.0)	51.3 (10.7)	41.5 (5.3)	30.2 (−1.0)	19.1 (−7.2)	6.0 (−14.4)	−5.6 (−20.9)
Record low °F (°C)	−24 (−31)	−20 (−29)	−6 (−21)	10 (−12)	25 (−4)	36 (2)	42 (6)	37 (3)	27 (−3)	16 (−9)	−3 (−19)	−19 (−28)	−24 (−31)
Average precipitation inches (mm)	2.88 (73)	2.44 (62)	3.02 (77)	3.99 (101)	4.60 (117)	4.58 (116)	4.58 (116)	3.90 (99)	3.19 (81)	2.95 (75)	3.07 (78)	2.66 (68)	41.86 (1,063)
Average snowfall inches (cm)	8.4 (21)	7.7 (20)	4.6 (12)	0.5 (1.3)	0.0 (0.0)	0.0 (0.0)	0.0 (0.0)	0.0 (0.0)	0.0 (0.0)	0.1 (0.25)	1.4 (3.6)	5.1 (13)	27.8 (71)
Average precipitation days (≥ 0.01 in)	10.5	8.6	10.3	11.7	12.6	11.7	9.4	8.5	8.0	9.4	9.5	10.6	120.8
Average snowy days (≥ 0.1 in)	4.6	4.0	2.3	0.3	0.0	0.0	0.0	0.0	0.0	0.1	1.0	3.5	15.8
Source: NOAA

== Demographics ==
Historical population
Census	Pop.	Note	%±
1890	544		—
1900	1,037		90.6%
1910	1,316		26.9%
1920	1,537		16.8%
1930	1,883		22.5%
1940	2,075		10.2%
1950	2,277		9.7%
1960	2,644		16.1%
1970	2,988		13.0%
1980	3,300		10.4%
1990	3,559		7.8%
2000	4,150		16.6%
2010	3,999		−3.6%
2020	4,173		4.4%
U.S. Decennial Census

=== 2020 census ===
As of the 2020 census, Berne had a population of 4,173. The median age was 40.8 years. 24.0% of residents were under the age of 18 and 22.6% of residents were 65 years of age or older. For every 100 females there were 91.2 males, and for every 100 females age 18 and over there were 89.5 males age 18 and over.

0.0% of residents lived in urban areas, while 100.0% lived in rural areas.

There were 1,682 households in Berne, of which 28.8% had children under the age of 18 living in them. Of all households, 50.6% were married-couple households, 18.5% were households with a male householder and no spouse or partner present, and 27.3% were households with a female householder and no spouse or partner present. About 32.2% of all households were made up of individuals and 15.3% had someone living alone who was 65 years of age or older.

There were 1,831 housing units, of which 8.1% were vacant. The homeowner vacancy rate was 1.6% and the rental vacancy rate was 8.6%.

Racial composition as of the 2020 census
Race	Number	Percent
White	3,840	92.0%
Black or African American	7	0.2%
American Indian and Alaska Native	10	0.2%
Asian	44	1.1%
Native Hawaiian and Other Pacific Islander	0	0.0%
Some other race	105	2.5%
Two or more races	167	4.0%
Hispanic or Latino (of any race)	224	5.4%

=== 2010 census ===
As of the census of 2010, there were 3,999 people, 1,620 households, and 1,078 families residing in the city. The population density was 1,922.6 inhabitants per square mile (742.3/km^{2}). There were 1,797 housing units at an average density of 863.9 per square mile (333.6/km^{2}). The racial makeup of the city was 96.5% White, 0.5% African American, 0.1% Native American, 0.6% Asian, 1.4% from other races, and 1.0% from two or more races. Hispanic or Latino of any race were 4.0% of the population.

There were 1,620 households, out of which 29.3% had children under the age of 18 living with them, 53.4% were married couples living together, 9.9% had a female householder with no husband present, 3.3% had a male householder with no wife present, and 33.5% were non-families. 31.3% of all households were made up of individuals, and 17.5% had someone living alone who was 65 years of age or older. The average household size was 2.35 and the average family size was 2.94.

The median age in the city was 42 years. 24.1% of residents were under the age of 18; 7% were between the ages of 18 and 24; 22.4% were from 25 to 44; 22.6% were from 45 to 64; and 24% were 65 years of age or older. The gender makeup of the city was 46.1% male and 53.9% female.

=== 2000 census ===
As of the 2000 census, there were 4,150 people, 1,639 households, and 1,104 families residing in the city. The population density was 2,307.3 inhabitants per square mile (890.9/km^{2}). There were 1,690 housing units at an average density of 939.6 per square mile (362.8/km^{2}). The racial makeup of the city was 97.64% White, 0.07% African American, 0.07% Native American, 0.22% Asian, 0.05% Pacific Islander, 1.04% from other races, and 0.92% from two or more races. Hispanic or Latino of any race were 1.90% of the population.

There were 1,639 households, out of which 32.0% had children under the age of 18 living with them, 57.5% were married couples living together, 7.7% had a female householder with no husband present, and 32.6% were non-families. 31.4% of all households were made up of individuals, and 18.9% had someone living alone who was 65 years of age or older. The average household size was 2.40 and the average family size was 3.02.

25.7% of the population was under the age of 18, 6.8% from 18 to 24, 24.3% from 25 to 44, 19.3% from 45 to 64, and 23.8% were 65 years of age or older. The median age was 40 years. For every 100 females, there were 86.5 males. For every 100 females aged 18 and over, there were 80.5 males.

The median income for a household in the city was $35,491, and the median income for a family was $45,670. Males had a median income of $31,565 versus $21,563 for females. The per capita income for the city was $17,394. About 1.4% of families and 3.6% of the population were below the poverty line, including 2.5% of those under age 18 and 6.1% of those age 65 or over.

== Economy ==
As the "furniture capital of Indiana," several different furniture manufacturers have existed in Berne during the city's history, including:

- Gehrig Furniture (1877–1905)
- Dunbar Furniture Manufacturing Company (1919–1993)
- Berne Furniture Company (1925–2008)
- Smith Brothers of Berne, Inc. (1926–present)
- Yager Furniture, Inc. (1910–present)
- Habegger Furniture, Inc. (1938–present)
- Clauser Furniture, Inc. (1949–present)
- Bernhaus Furniture, Inc. (2003–present)

== Government ==
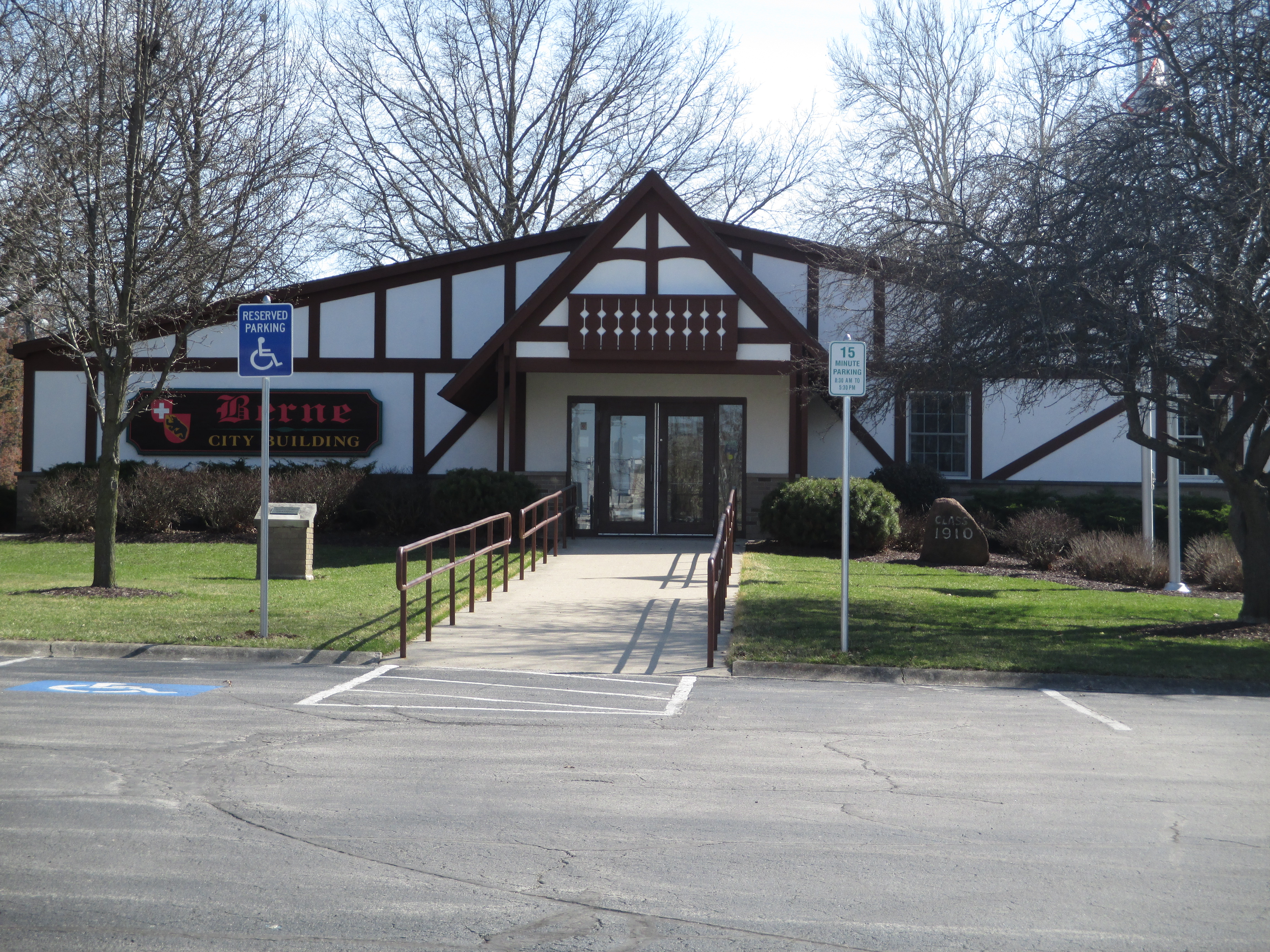
Berne City Hall

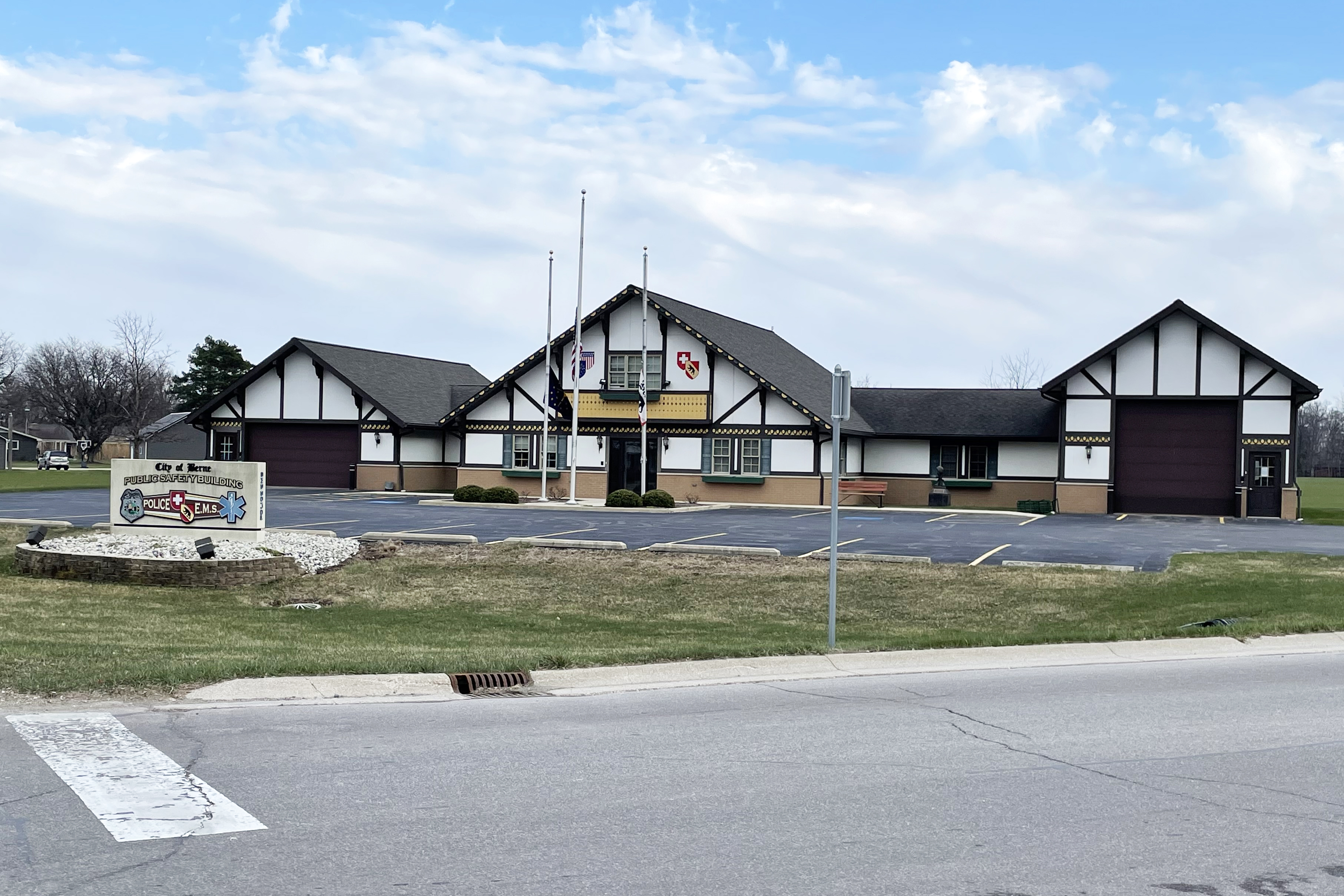
Berne Police Station

Gregg A. Sprunger has served as Mayor of the City of Berne since 2020.

Along with an elected Mayor, the city of Berne elects a Clerk-Treasurer and a City Council. The City Council is composed of five members, four elected from established districts and one at-large member.

Berne Mayors:

- Gregg Sprunger (R) (2020-)
- Bill McKean (R) (2012–2020)
- John Minch (D) (2004–2012)
- Blaine Fulton (R) (1992–2004)
- Delmar Neuenschwander (D) (1984–1992)
- Gaylord Stuckey (D) (1976–1984)
- Willard "Bill" Wulliman (R) (1968–1976)
- Richard Lehman (D) (1964–1968)
- Forrest Balsiger (D) (1952–1964)
- Andrew Sprunger (D) (1950–1952)

== Education ==
=== Public ===
K-12 public education in Berne is provided by South Adams Schools. South Adams High School shares its building with the Elementary and Middle Schools. Their nickname is the Starfires.

Four area schools consolidated into "South Adams" just prior to the 1966–67 school year. They were the "Berne Bears", the "Geneva Cardinals", the "Hartford Gorillas", and the "Jefferson Warriors." Though the consolidated school was located in Berne, as a compromise the school took a new name and mascot - "The South Adams Starfires" - ostensibly named after the first principal/superintendent's car (an Oldsmobile Starfire).

=== Library ===
The Berne Public Library, which opened its doors in 1935 and is currently located in the former city auditorium, serves the city of Berne. The library provides information services to all ages and holds over 60,000 titles, including print, digital, audio, and visual forms. The Heritage Room of the Berne Public Library contains local history and genealogical information.

== Culture ==
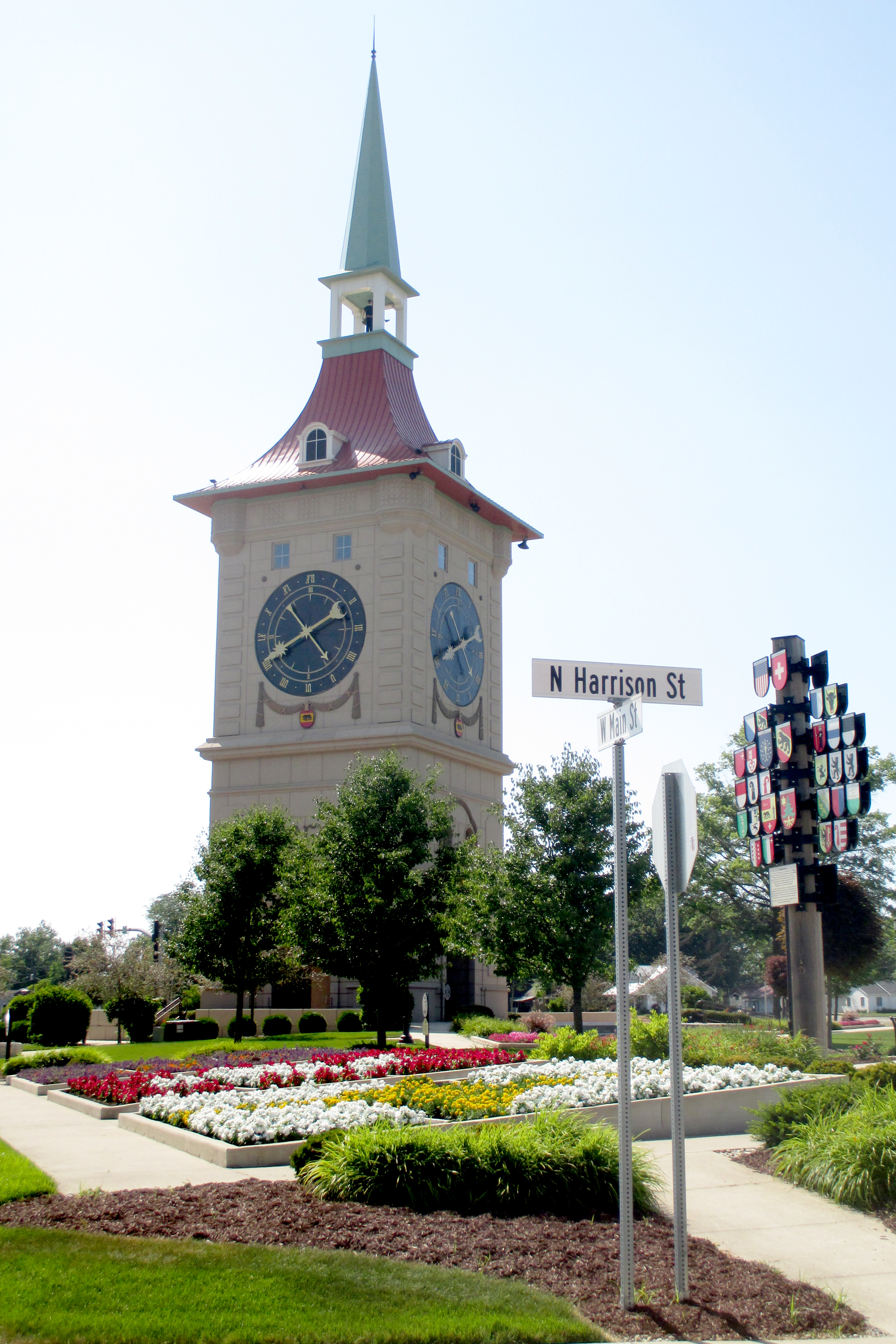
Muensterberg Plaza & Clock Tower

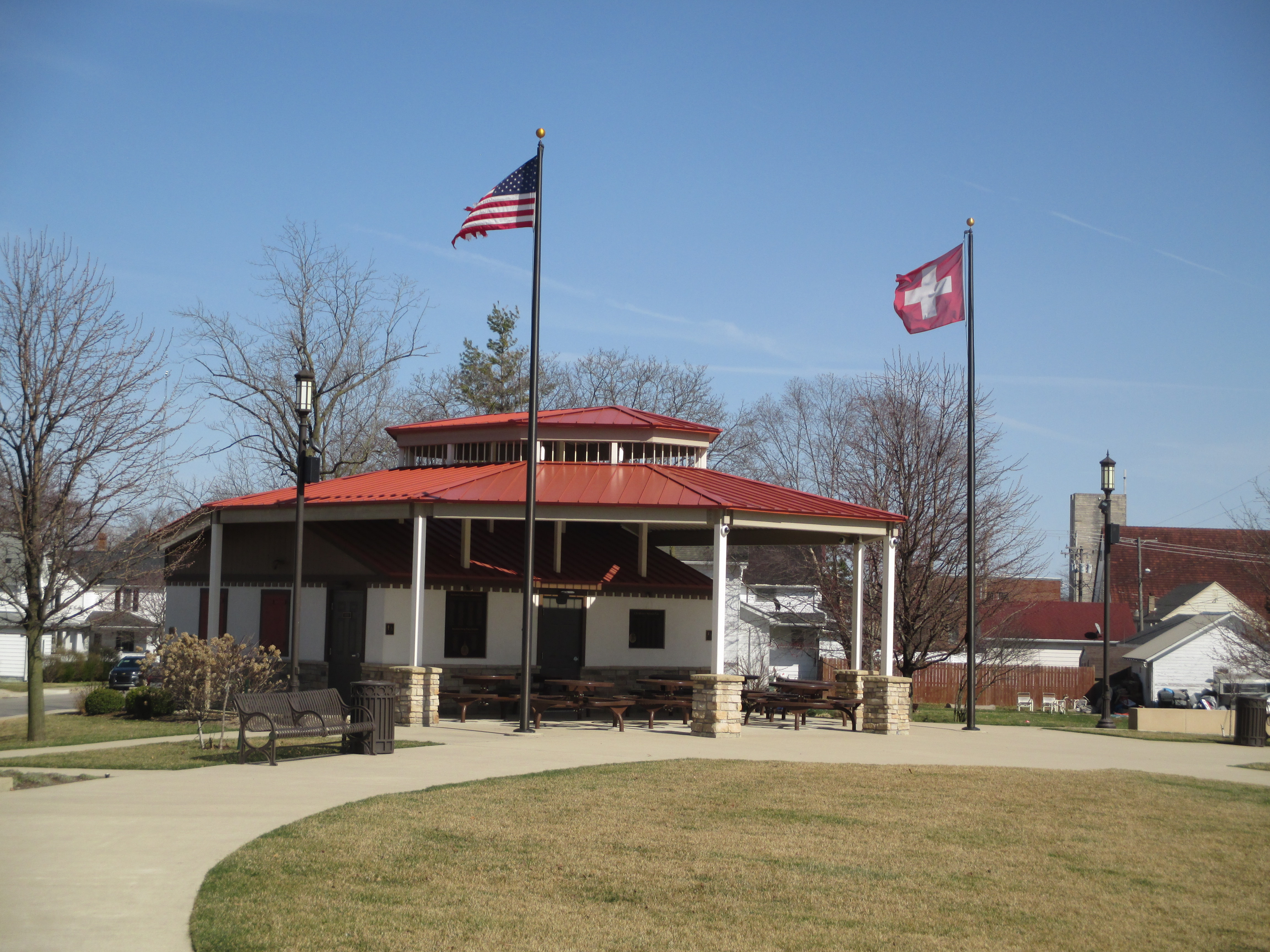
Muensterberg Pavilion

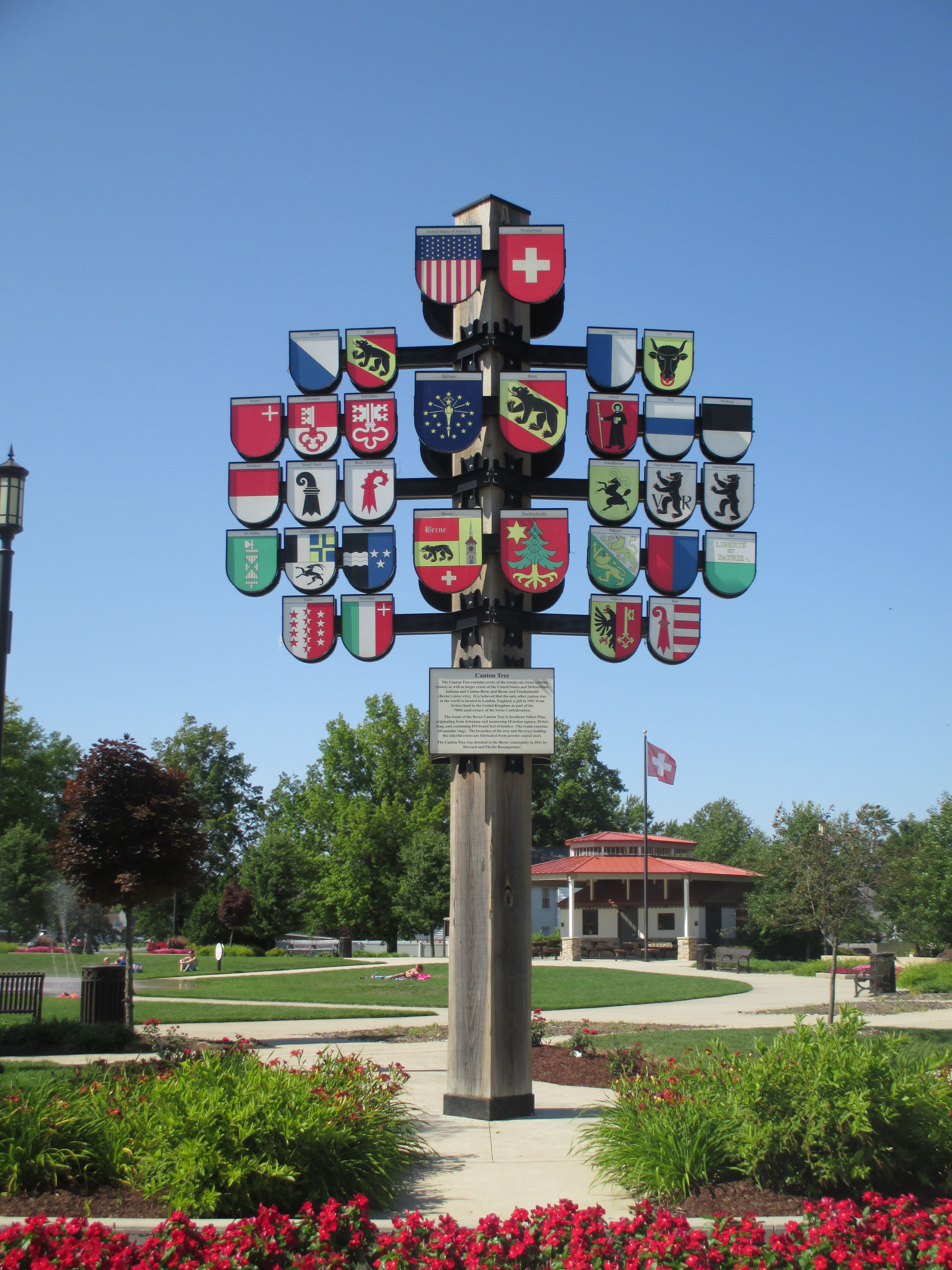
Berne Canton Tree

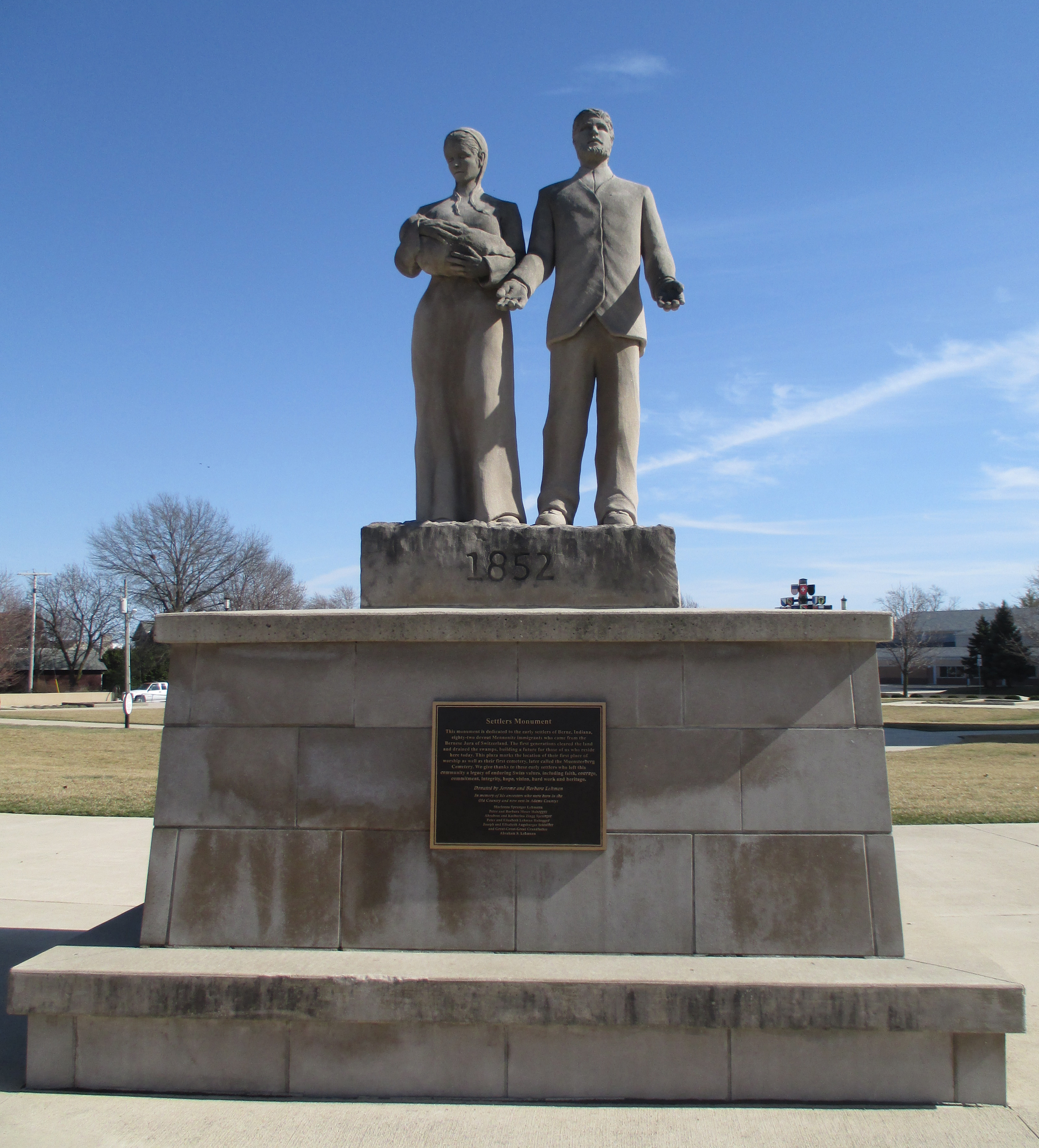
Settlers Statute

=== Swiss Days Celebration ===
The annual Swiss Days Celebration in Berne is held the last Friday and Saturday in July and attracts thousands of visitors every year as locals celebrate their Swiss and American culture.

=== City parks ===
==== Muensterberg Plaza and Clock Tower ====
The idea of building the clock tower and plaza was first raised in 2001 while the city of Berne was planning for its sesquicentennial. Wanting to celebrate the city's Swiss heritage, it was decided to model the clock tower after the medieval Zytglogge in Bern, Switzerland, the oldest monument in that city (built c. 1220, repaired in 1405). The clock tower and plaza were given the name Muensterberg (Münsterberg) after the small Mennonite community in the Jura Mountains of Switzerland that Berne's first immigrants came from. The clock tower was constructed in 2010. It stands 160 feet tall and 32 feet wide, weighing approximately 1,216 tons (over 2.4 million pounds). It contains carillon bells created by the Verdin Company.

The Muensterberg Plaza built around the clock tower also features The Settler's Statue commemorating the arrival of the first settlers to the area, the only stateside Canton Tree, and a series of flowerbeds laid out to resemble common quilting patterns.

==== Lehman Park ====
Lehman Park is a wooded 11.5-acre park located at the intersection of US 27 and Park Avenue. The land for the park was donated to the city of Berne by Isaac and Caroline Lehman in 1928.

== Media ==
Berne is served by one tri-weekly newspaper, The Berne Witness. At one time both German and English editions were offered; the former was later discontinued.

Berne, along with the rest of Adams County, is served by WZBD.

== Notable people ==
- Mary Butcher - All-American Girls Professional Baseball League player
- The Dilley sextuplets - the USA's first surviving sextuplets
- Bob Dro - basketball and baseball player for Indiana University and the Indianapolis Kautskys
- Arthur L. Gilliom - 25th Indiana Attorney General
- Les Habegger - former General Manager of the NBA's Seattle SuperSonics (1983–85)
- Ervin Inniger - Indiana Hoosiers men's basketball player
- Peter Luginbill - early founder and settler of Berne
- Donald Neuen - former Professor and Director of Choral Conducting & Choral Studies at UCLA's Herb Alpert School of Music
- Richard R. Schrock - Winner of the 2005 Nobel Prize in Chemistry for his work in the area of olefin metathesis
- Jerome "Jerry" Steiner - Butler Bulldogs men's basketball player
- Ernie Steury - missionary doctor who established the Tenwek Hospital in Kenya
- Rolland McCune
