= John Watkins (architect) =

American architect

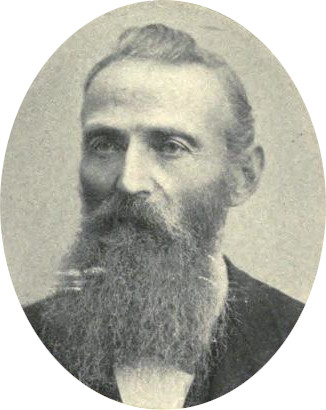
- Born: April 13, 1834; Maidstone, England
- Died: December 23, 1902 (aged 68); Midway, Utah
- Known for: Builder and architect of historic Utah buildings

John Watkins (April 13, 1834 – December 23, 1902) was a practical architect and builder in London and Utah.

He was born in Maidstone, Kent, England. While living in London, he converted to the Church of Jesus Christ of Latter-day Saints in 1852, and four years later he and his family emigrated to Utah as part of the Martin handcart company.

Watkins and his family settled in Provo, Utah, where he worked on the Old Provo Tabernacle. In 1865, after marrying twice more, he moved to Midway, Utah, where he designed some of his best-known works. He also served for 17 years as an LDS Bishop until his death Christmas of 1902.

A number of his works are listed on the U.S. National Register of Historic Places.

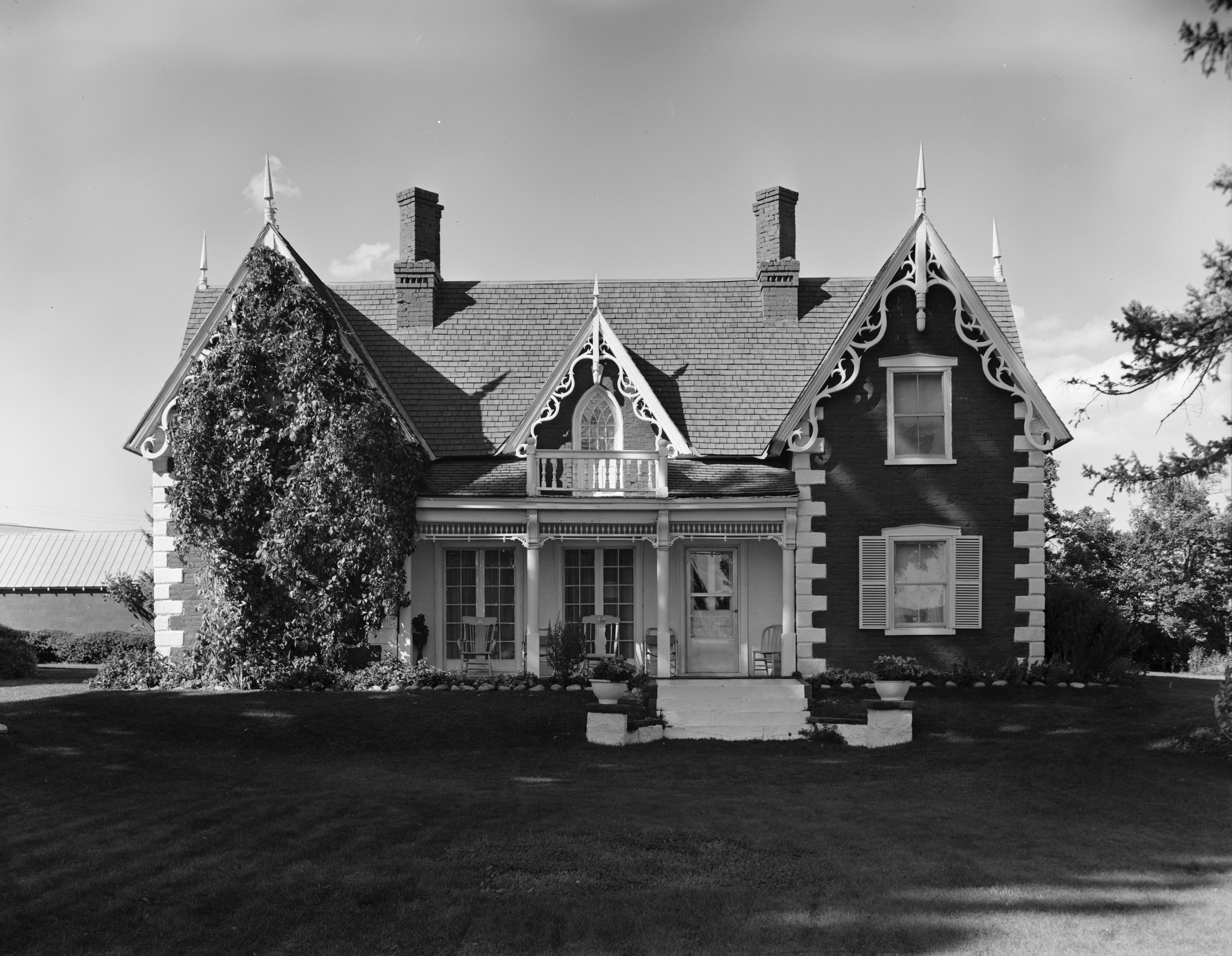
The Watkins–Coleman House, completed in 1869 in Midway, Utah, was designed by John Watkins and was his principal place of residence before being sold to the Coleman family. It was listed on the National Register of Historic Places in 1971.

Watkins designed some LDS meetinghouses in Provo and Springville.

Works include:

- George Bonner Jr. House, 90 E. Main, Midway, Utah, NRHP-listed
- George Bonner Sr. House, 103 E. Main, Midway, Utah, NRHP-listed
- William Bonner House, 110 E. Main, Midway, Utah, NRHP-listed
- William Coleman House, 180 N. Center, Midway, Utah, NRHP-listed
- John and Margaret Watkins House, 22 W. Hundred S, Midway, Utah, NRHP-listed
- Watkins–Coleman House, 5 E. Main St., Midway, Utah, NRHP-listed
