= George Blackley House =

- U.S. National Register of Historic Places
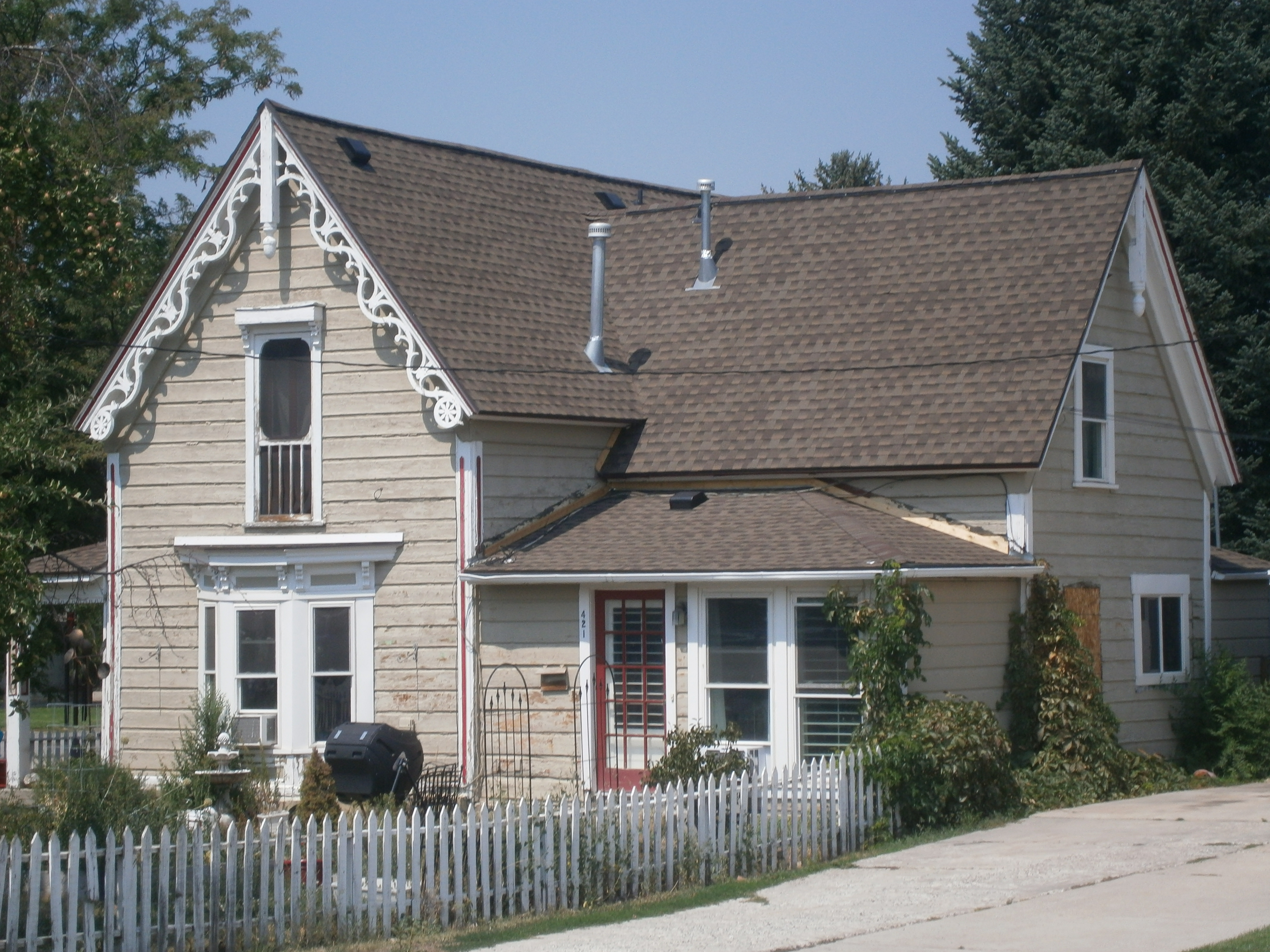

- Location within Utah
- Location: 421 E. 200 North, Heber City, Utah
- Coordinates: 40°30′38″N 111°24′19″W
- Area: less than one acre
- Built: 1877
- Built by: Blackley, George
- Architectural style: Carpenter Gothic
- NRHP reference No.: 85001392
- Added to NRHP: June 27, 1985

The George Blackley House, at 421 E. 200 North in Heber City, Utah, was built in 1877. It was listed on the National Register of Historic Places in 1985.

It is a one-and-a-half-story central passage plan house with Carpenter Gothic styling. It was built in 1877-78 by George Blackley, a carpenter and joiner, who lived there until his death in 1902. He was born in England in 1830 and came to the U.S. and Utah in 1869.
