= Watkins–Coleman House =

Historic house in Utah, United States

- U.S. National Register of Historic Places
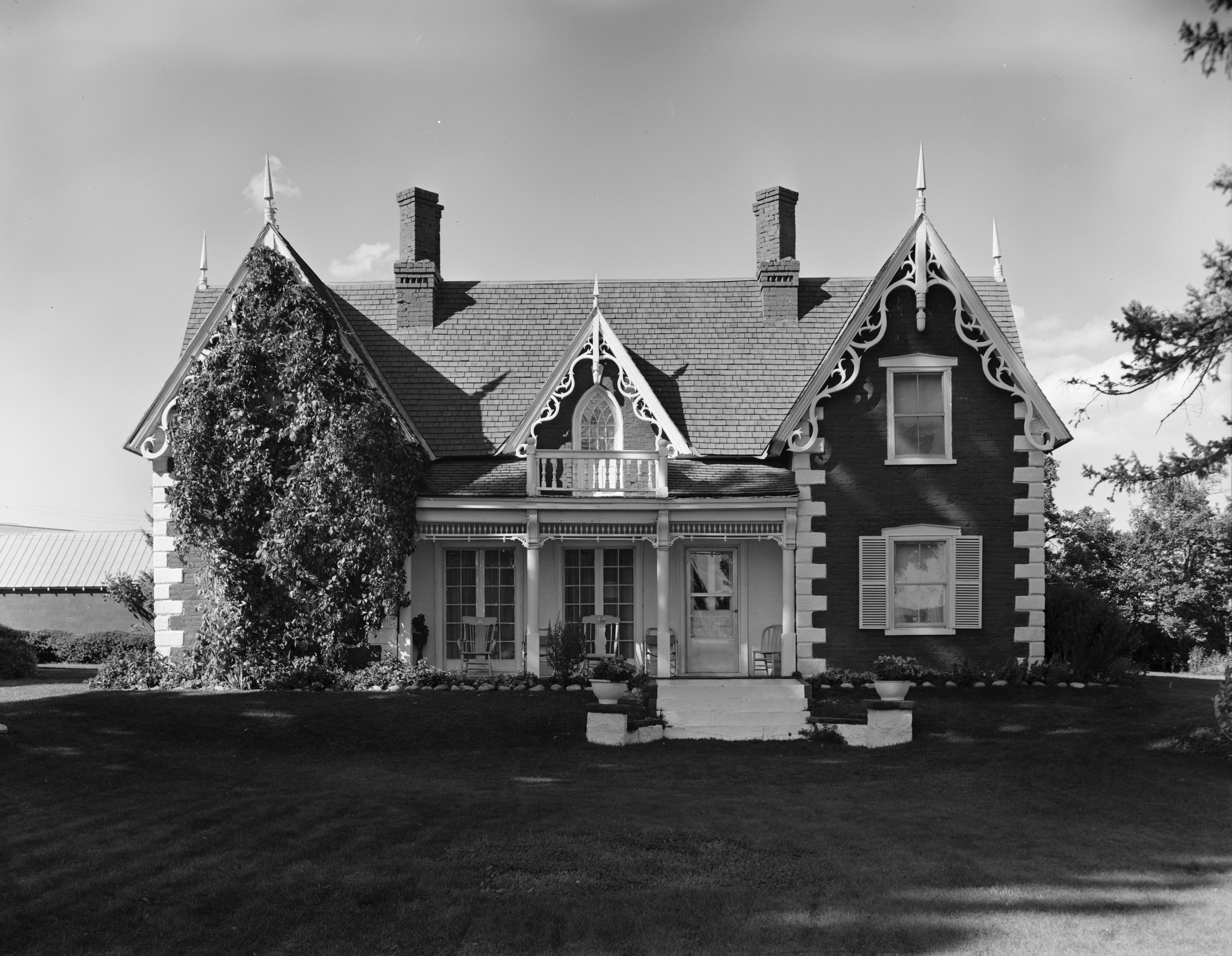
- Watkins–Coleman House in 1968

- Location within Utah Location within the United States
- Location: 5 E. Main St., Midway, Utah
- Coordinates: 40°30′45″N 111°28′16″W
- Area: 1.6 acres (0.65 ha)
- Built: 1869
- Architect: Watkins, John
- NRHP reference No.: 71000858
- Added to NRHP: May 14, 1971

The Watkins–Coleman House was designed and built by John Watkins in 1869 in Midway, Utah. Watkins, trained as an architect in England, emigrated to the United States in 1856 to house his polygamist family. In 1903 the house was sold to Henry T. Coleman. The 2 1/2-story Carpenter Gothic house was built in red brick, with extensive scroll-cut ornamentation on the eaves. Corners are accented with contrasting white sandstone quoins. The steeply pitched roof is covered in green-stained wood shingles.

The Watkins–Coleman House was placed on the National Register of Historic Places on May 14, 1971.
