= Midway, Utah =

City in Utah, United States

- City
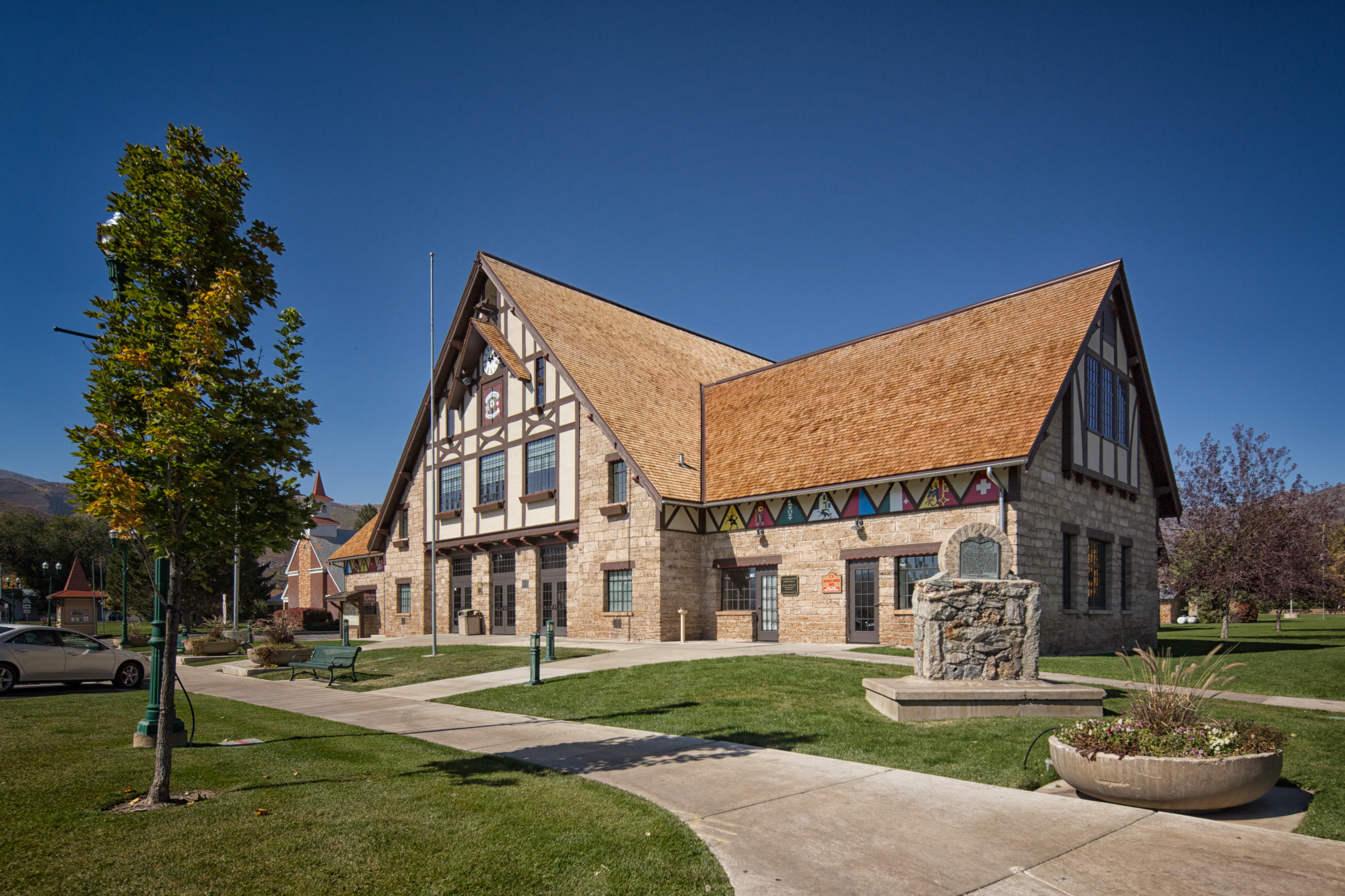
- Town Hall

- Location in Wasatch County and the state of Utah
- Coordinates: 40°30′52″N 111°28′38″W
- Country: United States
- State: Utah
- County: Wasatch
- Settled: 1859

Area
  - Total: 5.55 sq mi (14.37 km^{2})
  - Land: 5.55 sq mi (14.37 km^{2})
  - Water: 0 sq mi (0.00 km^{2})
- Elevation: 5,653 ft (1,723 m)

Population (2020)
  - Total: 6,003
  - Density: 951.4/sq mi (367.33/km^{2})
- Time zone: UTC-7 (Mountain (MST))
  - Summer (DST): UTC-6 (MDT)
- ZIP code: 84049
- Area code: 435
- FIPS code: 49-49820
- GNIS feature ID: 2411101
- Website: Official website

Midway is a city in northwestern Wasatch County, Utah, United States. It is located in the Heber Valley, approximately 3 miles (4.8 km) west of Heber City and 28 miles (45 km) southeast of Salt Lake City, on the opposite side of the Wasatch Mountains. The population was 6,003 at the 2020 census.

== History ==
The first known European-Americans to visit the area were members of a fur-trapping brigade led by Étienne Provost, a French-Canadian trapper, in 1824. This expedition explored the region, which was then known as Upper Provo, a name derived from the Provo River that flows through the valley. While these early visitors did not establish permanent settlements, their journey marked the beginning of exploration in the area.

In the mid-1850s, settlers began to push into the Heber Valley, encouraged by reports from loggers in the nearby mountains who noted the fertile land. Settlers of Utah Valley pushed the territorial government to create a road up the Provo Canyon, a proposal favored by territorial governor Brigham Young. In 1858, the construction of a road through Provo Canyon provided easier access to the valley, allowing for further settlement. Despite early attempts in 1855 and 1857, harsh winters forced settlers to temporarily abandon the area. Permanent settlement was only achieved in 1858-59, when settlers established several small communities in the valley, two of which were west of the Provo River. These were known as the "upper settlement" and "lower settlement" on the Snake Creek River. The upper settlement was also called Mound City, named for the nearby limestone formations.

In the 1860s, the upper and lower settlement merged to become Midway, so named because it was the site of Fort Midway, halfway between the two. Though local history claims Midway's creation was prompted by the Black Hawk War, a post office named Midway was in operation at least as early as 1864, before the Black Hawk War began. The site of Fort Midway is now the town square.

== Geography ==
According to the United States Census Bureau, the city has a total area of 3.3 square miles (8.7 km^{2}), all land. The region in which Midway sits is known as the Wasatch Back. Midway is bisected from north to south by Snake Creek, which includes the Midway Fish Hatchery just before the creek joins the middle section of the Provo River above Deer Creek Reservoir.

=== Climate ===
This climatic region is typified by large seasonal temperature differences, with warm to hot summers and cold (sometimes severely cold) winters. According to the Köppen Climate Classification system, Midway has a humid continental climate, abbreviated "Dfb" on climate maps.

=== Geology ===
The Wasatch Fault runs underneath Midway, including the main fault line west of the town and the Bald Mountain Fault, which runs through the valley as well. Fault activity is responsible for some of the formations in the mountains around Midway, as well as the characteristic limestone ("potrock") mounds and the prevalence of hot springs in the area.

== Demographics ==
Historical population
Census	Pop.	Note	%±
1870	378		—
1880	718		89.9%
1890	769		7.1%
1900	939		22.1%
1910	1,003		6.8%
1920	805		−19.7%
1930	745		−7.5%
1940	801		7.5%
1950	711		−11.2%
1960	713		0.3%
1970	804		12.8%
1980	1,194		48.5%
1990	1,554		30.2%
2000	2,121		36.5%
2010	3,845		81.3%
2020	6,003		56.1%
2022 (est.)	6,217		3.6%
U.S. Decennial Census

=== 2020 census ===
As of the 2020 census, Midway had a population of 6,003. The median age was 39.8 years. 30.2% of residents were under the age of 18 and 18.8% of residents were 65 years of age or older. For every 100 females there were 100.2 males, and for every 100 females age 18 and over there were 95.8 males age 18 and over.

94.5% of residents lived in urban areas, while 5.5% lived in rural areas.

There were 2,017 households in Midway, of which 37.5% had children under the age of 18 living in them. Of all households, 70.5% were married-couple households, 11.3% were households with a male householder and no spouse or partner present, and 15.7% were households with a female householder and no spouse or partner present. About 16.6% of all households were made up of individuals and 9.0% had someone living alone who was 65 years of age or older.

There were 2,569 housing units, of which 21.5% were vacant. The homeowner vacancy rate was 3.0% and the rental vacancy rate was 7.2%.

Racial composition as of the 2020 census
Race	Number	Percent
White	5,503	91.7%
Black or African American	10	0.2%
American Indian and Alaska Native	14	0.2%
Asian	31	0.5%
Native Hawaiian and Other Pacific Islander	5	0.1%
Some other race	200	3.3%
Two or more races	240	4.0%
Hispanic or Latino (of any race)	350	5.8%

=== 2010 census ===
As of the 2010 census Midway had a population of 3,845. The ethnic and racial makeup of the population was 92.6% non-Hispanic White, 0.2% African-American, 0.5% Asian, 0.1% Pacific Islander, 0.9% reporting two or more races and 5.5% Hispanic.

=== 2000 census ===
As of the census of 2000, there were 2,121 people, 687 households, and 550 families residing in the city. The population density was 633.3 people per square mile (244.5/km^{2}). There were 1,000 housing units at an average density of 298.6 per square mile (115.3/km^{2}). The racial makeup of the city was 97.22% White, 0.05% African American, 0.38% Native American, 0.19% Asian, 0.19% Pacific Islander, 0.38% from other races, and 1.60% from two or more races. Hispanic or Latino of any race were 2.78% of the population.

There were 687 households, out of which 43.2% had children under the age of 18 living with them, 71.0% were married couples living together, 6.4% had a female householder with no husband present, and 19.9% were non-families. 18.0% of all households were made up of individuals, and 5.8% had someone living alone who was 65 years of age or older. The average household size was 3.09 and the average family size was 3.53.

In the city, the population was spread out, with 33.5% under the age of 18, 9.9% from 18 to 24, 25.8% from 25 to 44, 21.7% from 45 to 64, and 9.0% who were 65 years of age or older. The median age was 31 years. For every 100 females, there were 104.9 males. For every 100 females age 18 and over, there were 98.6 males.

The median income for a household in the city was $51,071, and the median income for a family was $55,809. Males had a median income of $40,870 versus $25,682 for females. The per capita income for the city was $22,551. About 3.4% of families and 5.2% of the population were below the poverty line, including 6.4% of those under age 18 and 4.9% of those age 65 or over.

== Arts and culture ==
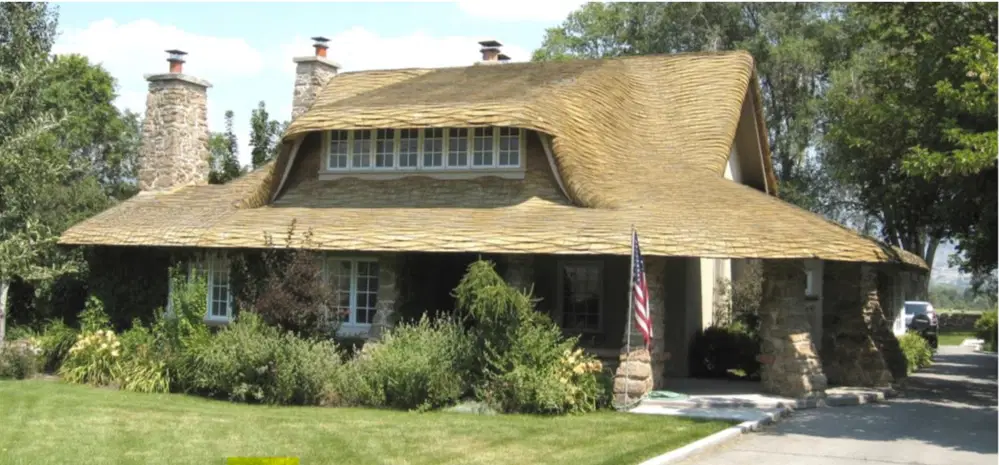
The Hobbit House

Midway's architecture is notable for its Swiss influence, and some subdivisions require new houses to include a certain percentage of features associated with Swiss house styles. Architect John Watkins lived in Midway, and several of his works remain extant, including the Watkins–Coleman House. The John H. and Agnes Buehler House, built in 1893, is known as the "Hobbit house" or "mushroom house".

Midway Swiss Days was founded in 1947 in order to attract tourists to Midway. The Swiss theme was created by screenwriter Orma W. Wallengren, whose family owned a local resort.

Artistic events include Art Around the Square, and the Midway Arts Center.

Soldier Hollow features the Utah Ice Castles, cross-country skiing, and a tubing hill.

== Parks and recreation ==
Wasatch Mountain State Park on Snake Creek is located in north Midway.

Homestead caldera is a resort with a geo-thermal pool that features year-round scuba diving in the caldera's warm water.

== Government ==
Midway is governed by a five-person city council. The members of the city council as of December 2024 are Lisa Orme, Craig Simons, Jeff Drury, Kevin Payne, and JC Simonsen.

== Media ==
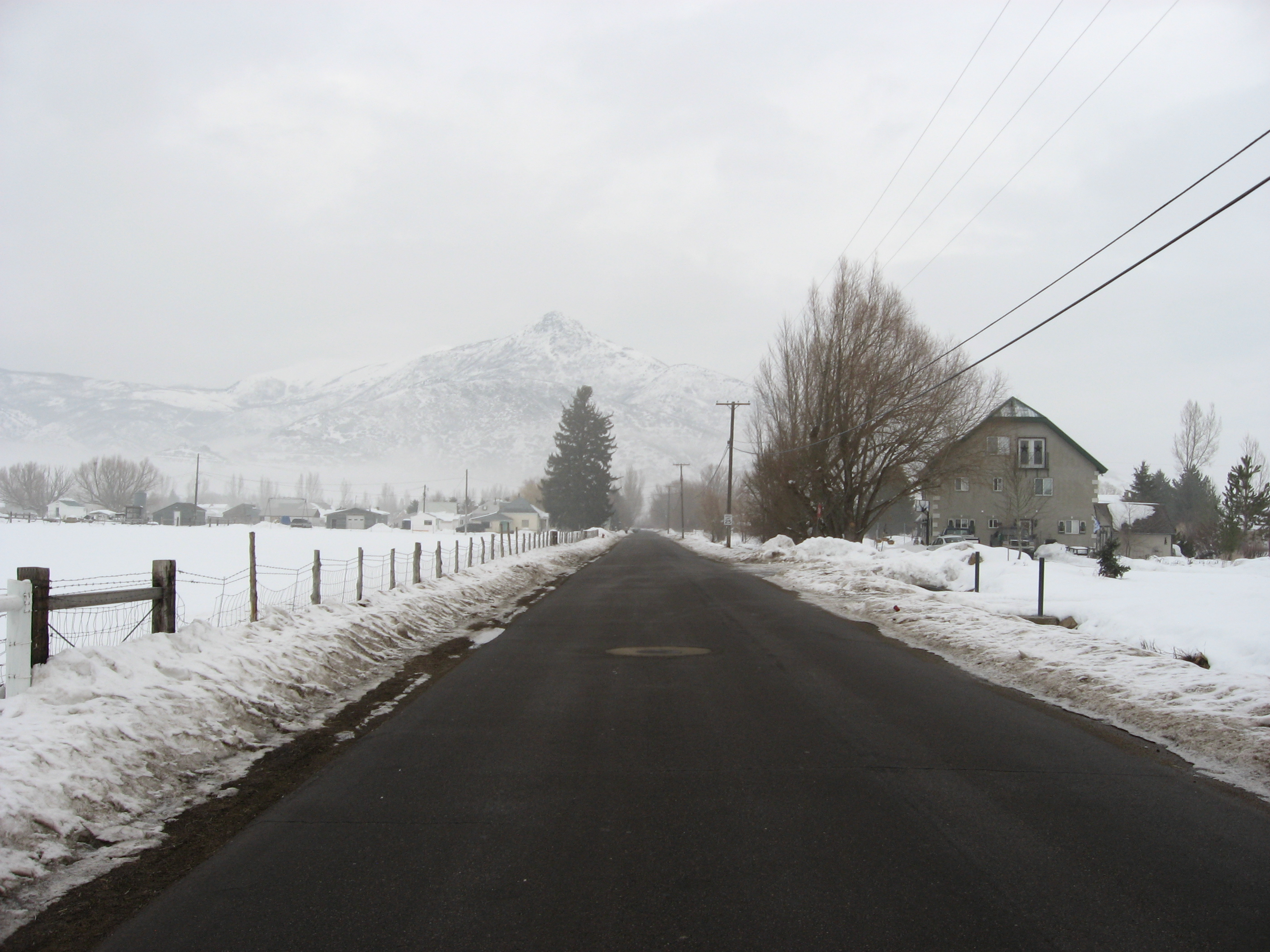
North Center Street

In the film 127 Hours, the scene where Ralston and two girls drop into a hidden pool was filmed at Homestead caldera at the Homestead Resort.

== Notable people ==
- Arthur V. Watkins, politician
- John Watkins, architect
- Dean Hughes, author
- Mike Massey, billiards player
- Mike Kohler, politician

== See also ==
- List of cities in Utah
