= National Register of Historic Places listings in Beaufort County, North Carolina =

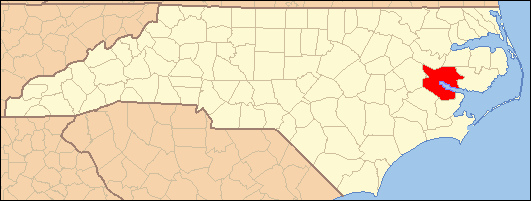

This list includes properties and districts listed on the National Register of Historic Places in Beaufort County, North Carolina. Click the "Map of all coordinates" link to the right to view an online map of all properties and districts with latitude and longitude coordinates in the table below.

== Current listings ==
This National Park Service list is complete through NPS recent listings posted February 20, 2026.

	Name on the Register	Image	Date listed	Location	City or town	Description
1	Bank of Washington, West End Branch	Bank of Washington, West End Branch	February 18, 1971 (#71000566)	216 W. Main St. 35°32′36″N 77°03′24″W	Washington	
2	Bath Historic District	Bath Historic District	February 26, 1970 (#70000437)	Bounded by Bath Creek, NC 92, and King St. 35°28′33″N 76°48′50″W	Bath	
3	Bath School	Bath School	January 30, 2008 (#07001495)	King and Carteret Sts. 35°28′35″N 76°48′42″W	Bath	
4	Beaufort County Courthouse	Beaufort County Courthouse	March 31, 1971 (#71000567)	Corner of W. 2nd and Market Sts. 35°32′35″N 77°03′16″W	Washington	
5	Belfont Plantation House		December 12, 1976 (#76001305)	North of Latham on SR 1411; 35°37′06″N 77°08′14″W	Latham	
6	Belhaven City Hall	Belhaven City Hall	January 27, 1981 (#81000420)	Main St. 35°32′21″N 76°37′18″W	Belhaven	
7	Belhaven Commercial Historic District	Belhaven Commercial Historic District	April 24, 2015 (#15000180)	260-292 E. Main and 246-288 and 251-279 Pamlico Sts. 35°32′16″N 76°37′16″W	Belhaven	
8	Bonner House	Bonner House	February 26, 1970 (#70000438)	Front St. 35°28′20″N 76°48′49″W	Bath	
9	Bowers-Tripp House	Bowers-Tripp House	April 1, 1999 (#99000424)	1040 N. Market St. 35°33′05″N 77°02′56″W	Washington	
10	North Market Street Historic District	North Market Street Historic District	October 25, 2011 (#11000767)	Roughly bounded by 15th, Nicholson, and 6th Sts., and Summit Ave. 35°33′06″N 77°02′56″W	Washington	
11	Palmer-Marsh House	Palmer-Marsh House	February 26, 1970 (#70000439)	Main St., south of NC 92; 35°28′36″N 76°48′51″W	Bath	
12	Pantego Academy		October 25, 1984 (#84000114)	Academy St. 35°35′26″N 76°39′47″W	Pantego	
13	Pantego School No. 2		February 24, 2026 (#100012434)	150 Swamp Road; 35°35′07″N 76°40′02″W	Pantego	
14	Rosedale		April 29, 1982 (#82003424)	Northwest of Washington off SR 1407; 35°35′48″N 77°05′26″W	Washington	
15	St. Thomas Episcopal Church	St. Thomas Episcopal Church	November 20, 1970 (#70000440)	Craven St. 35°28′26″N 76°48′50″W	Bath	
16	Trinity Cemetery	Trinity Cemetery	August 19, 2011 (#11000545)	North Carolina Highway 33, 0.07 miles west of its junction with NC 1157; 35°30′57″N 77°07′09″W	Chocowinity	
17	U.S. ARMY GUNBOAT PICKET (screw steamer)		August 24, 2018 (#100002796)	Address Restricted	Washington	
18	Ware Creek School	Ware Creek School	December 6, 1996 (#96001443)	Eastern side of NC 1103, 0.3 miles southeast of its junction with NC 1112; 35°25′12″N 76°56′19″W	Blounts Creek	
19	Washington Historic District	Washington Historic District	February 9, 1979 (#79001661)	Roughly bounded by Jacks Creek, the Pamlico River, and Hackney, 3rd, Market, 5th, Harvey, and 2nd Sts. 35°32′37″N 77°03′17″W	Washington	
20	Zion Episcopal Church	Zion Episcopal Church	August 16, 2000 (#00000988)	U.S. Route 264, 0.2 miles east of its junction with NC 1601; 35°31′23″N 76°56′05″W	Washington	

== See also ==
- National Register of Historic Places listings in North Carolina
- List of National Historic Landmarks in North Carolina
