= Zion Episcopal Church =

Zion Episcopal Church may refer to several churches in the United States:

Alphabetical by state, then town

- Zion Episcopal Church (Talbotton, Georgia), listed on the National Register of Historic Places (NRHP)
- Zion Episcopal Church and Rectory (Colton, New York), NRHP-listed
- Zion Episcopal Church (Queens), Douglaston, New York
- Zion Episcopal Church Complex and Harmony Cemetery, Morris, New York, NRHP-listed
- Zion Episcopal Church (Palmyra, New York), NRHP-listed
- Zion Episcopal Church (Wappingers Falls, New York)
- Zion Episcopal Church (Washington, North Carolina), NRHP-listed
- Zion Episcopal Church (Monroeville, Ohio), NRHP-listed
- Zion Episcopal Church (Charles Town, West Virginia)
