= Bug House Park =

Natural History Museum in Washington State

Coordinates: 35°32′20″N 77°02′42″W

Bug House Park is a park in Washington, North Carolina, that was home to the Washington Field Museum, commonly referred to as the Bug House or Bug House Laboratory The Park is at 121 North Charlotte Street and includes a playground and picnic shelter. It also has tennis and pickleball courts.

A postcard was made of the site. A memorial commemorates the history of the museum. In 2023, a centennial celebration was held.

The museum donated artifact to schools. Its collection included fossil shells from Runyon Creek in Beaufort County.

A bi-monthly magazine called The Reporter recounted member activities.
