= George H. Brown (North Carolina judge) =

American judge (1850–1926)

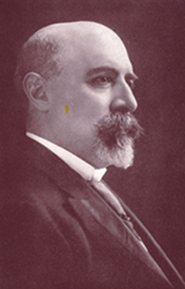

Associate Justice, North Carolina Supreme Court
- In office January 1, 1905 – December 31, 1920
- Preceded by: Walter A. Montgomery
- Succeeded by: Walter P. Stacy

Judge, North Carolina Superior Court
- In office January 1, 1889 – December 31, 1904
- Appointed by: Alfred Moore Scales
- Preceded by: James E. Shepherd

Personal details
- Born: George Hubbard Brown; May 3, 1850 Washington, North Carolina, U.S.
- Died: March 16, 1926 (aged 75) Washington, North Carolina, U.S.
- Resting place: Oakdale Cemetery
- Party: Democrat
- Profession: Lawyer

George Hubbard Brown Jr. (May 3, 1850 – March 16, 1926) was a justice of the North Carolina Supreme Court from 1905 to 1920. In 1927, Judge Robert Watson Winston said, "Justice Brown must be called our Dissenting Judge—he was unwilling to bend the law to meet difficult situations or to win popular favor."

== Early life ==
Brown was born in 1850 in Washington, North Carolina. His parents were Elizabeth Bonner and Sylvester T. Brown, a farmer. He was sometimes referred to as George Hubbard Brown Jr. because he shared the name with the uncle, a merchant and founder and president of the Bank of Washington. His maternal grandfather was Richard Bonner, a Washington merchant and the wealthiest man in Beaufort County when he died. He was also a descendant of James Bonner, the founder of Washington. His paternal ancestors included General Thomas Holliday and Captain George Hubbard, both Revolutionary War patriots. He also had four sisters.

Both of his parents died when he was a young man. When he was sixteen years old, Brown enrolled in Horner's School in Oxford, North Carolina, attending from 1866 to 1868. There, he studied the first book of Livy, three books of Julius Caesar, and some Virgil. Lacking money after his education, Brown became a telegraph operator at the main office in New York City in 1868, working at the desk next to Thomas Edison.

His plans to enroll in the sophomore class at the University of North Carolina at Chapel Hill were foiled when the university closed in 1870 during reconstruction. Instead, he moved to Wilson and lived with his parents. In 1871, he moved back to Washington with his parents. There, he studied law with James E. Shepherd, who later became his brother-in-law and chief justice of the North Carolina Supreme Court.

== Career ==
Brown passed the bar exam and received his law license in June 1872. He opened the law office of Satterthwaite and Brown with Fenner B. Satterthwaite in Washington. He was a Jeffersonian Democrat and chaired the Democratic Party in Beaufort County for many years. In 1880, he ran in the Democratic primary for Congress but did not secure the nomination.

After Satterwaite died in 1882, Brown operated a solo practice. He served as the county attorney of Beaufort County for several years. In 1884, he was a delegate to the Democratic National Convention that elected Grover Cleveland. He formed the practice Brown and Small with John H. Small in 1885, leaving in 1889 when he became a judge. Small was a mayor of Washington, editor of the Washington Gazette, and later became a congressman.

Governor Alfred Moore Scales appointed Brown to fill Shepherd's vacancy on the North Carolina Superior Court for the first judicial district, with a term starting January 1, 1889. In May 1889, he was assigned to cover fall term in Currituck, Camden, Chowan, Dare, Gates, Hertford, Hyde, Pamlico, Pasquotank, Perquimans, Terrell, and Washington counties. In 1890, he was elected as the first district judge to the North Carolina Superior Court without opposition, serving on the superior court for fifteen years. The Washington Gazette described Judge Brown, saying "His honor is possessed of a magnificent physique, as well as a strong and vigorous intelligence; his bearing both in and out of the courtroom is that of a high toned Christian gentleman, and great Judge."

Governor Thomas Michael Holt moved Brown to the Guilford court for December 1891 and the New Hanover court for January 1892. In 1898, there was a problem with Brown's reelection to the superior court; in some counties, he was listed on the ballot as George H. Brown instead of George H. Brown Jr. Some 15,000 votes went to George H. Brown in Caswell, Chatham, Clay, Dare, Duplin, Edgecombe, Forsyth, Franklin, Guilford, Harnett, and Hyde counties, but the North Carolina Secretary of State, Republican Cyrus Thompson, said he did not have the authority to credit those votes to George H. Brown Jr. In December 1898, attorney general Zeb V. Walser declared that the George H. Brown votes could be counted toward Brown, allowing him to win the election over the Republican candidate.

In 1902, Brown ran for the Democratic nomination for associate justice of the North Carolina Supreme Court against Henry G. Connor. Publisher of Raleigh's The News & Observer, Josephus Daniels was friends with both Connor and Brown but decided to support Connor. When Brown lost in a tight vote at the 1902 Democratic State Convention, Daniels promised him a unanimous nomination in two years. In the summer of 1904, Brown sat in classes at the law school at the University of North Carolina, taught by Thomas Ruffin, in preparation for serving on the Supreme Court.

Brown was elected to an eight-year term on the North Carolina Supreme Court. in 1904. His term started on January 1, 1905. He served under chief justice Walter Clark with whom he frequently disagreed on the law. He successfully ran for reelection 1912. As a judge, Brown was not inventive; he stuck to the letter of the law as it was written. Robert Watson Winston said, "The part George Hubbard Brown played in this judicial drama was unique...Judge Brown filled a place no other judge has ever filled—he was the acknowledged exponent of the vested interests of the State. Not only did he not cater to the people, he advocated principles they opposed. On the bench, he stood for property and property rights as much as for the rights of persons. Not only did he do this, but he gloried in the fact..."

Brown declined the nomination for reelection in 1920 because his health declined after he had influenza in 1918. He retired from the bench at the end of his term on December 31, 1920. Brown was succeeded by Walter P. Stacy. His rulings are in volumes 137 through 180 of the North Carolina Reports – Supreme Court of North Carolina.

Although Brown did not return to the practice of law after retiring from the bench, he qualified as a special or emergency judge for the Superior Court in 1921, presiding in various courts in North Carolina when asked by the governor. He also successfully assisted the North Carolina Attorney General when North Carolina was sued by the five leading railroads in Federal District Court and the Supreme Court of the United States. In March 1925, he spent two weeks as a special or emergency judge in Henderson County. This was followed by a term in Beaufort County in November 1925, his final time on the bench.

== Honors ==
- Brown received an honorary LL.D. from the University of North Carolina at Chapel Hill in 1912.
- The North Carolina Supreme Court adjourned in his honor on March 17, 1926.
- Brown's portrait hangs in the Superior Court building in Raleigh, North Carolina.
- Brown's portrait hangs in the superior courtroom in the Beaufort County Courthouse. It was restored in 2011.
- The George H. & Laura E. Brown Library opened in Washington in 1954. The library houses some of Brown's artifacts and papers.
- Duke University Libraries house a collection of Brown's correspondences.

== Personal life ==
Brown married Laura E. Ellison Lewis on December 17, 1874, in Washington. She was the daughter of Eliza A (née Tripp) and Henry Ellison, a turpentine dealer and former sheriff of Beaufort County. The couple did not have any children.

Brown was a lifelong member of St. Peter's Episcopal Church in Washington. He was fond of horses and horse races. Brown and his wife left funds to Washington for a new library building. Because of supply shortages caused by World War II, the town renovated Brown's former home at 122 Van Norden Street as an interim library until 1954.

In the spring of 1919, Brown became ill with influenza and spent time recovering in a sanatorium. While on his annual vacation to Asheville in August 1925, Brown had problems with his vision and saw an oculist. This problem impacted his reading, and his physical health began to decline. In late November 1926, Brown became ill with influenza while in Hendersonville. He was taken to the hospital in Washington, remaining there for several days. Although he returned to his home, he never recovered and was feeble in body and mind. On February 20, 1926, The News & Observer reported that Brown was in "poor health."

On March 16, 1926, Brown died of pneumonia at his home in Washington. His funeral was held at St. Peter's Episcopal Church. He was buried in a family plot at Oakdale Cemetery in Washington. After Brown's death, a revised will that he wrote in January 1926 was contested; the courts ruled that he lacked testamentary capacity at the time of this revision. The case pitted Brown's widow against his nieces and nephews, with the latter claiming the new will left them Brown's estate. Brown had made successful investments, leaving an estate of around $300,000 ($5,455,827 in today's money).

Political offices
Preceded by Walter A. Montgomery	Justice of the North Carolina Supreme Court; 1905–1920	Succeeded by Walter P. Stacy
