= Bath School =

Bath School may refer to:

- Bath Consolidated School, the Michigan school location
  - Bath School disaster, three bombing attacks in Michigan in 1927
- Bath School (Bath, North Carolina), listed on the NRHP in Beaufort County, North Carolina
- Bath Local School District, Ohio
- Bath School of Art and Design
