= Walter Montgomery =

Walter Montgomery may refer to:

- Walter Montgomery (actor) (1827–1871), American-British actor
- Walter Montgomery (wrestler) (1895–1950), Canadian wrestler
- Walter A. Montgomery (1845–1921), Civil War soldier and Justice of the North Carolina Supreme Court

== See also ==
- Walter Montgomery Jackson (1863–1923), American encyclopedia publisher
