= Bath, North Carolina =

- Town
- Town of Bath
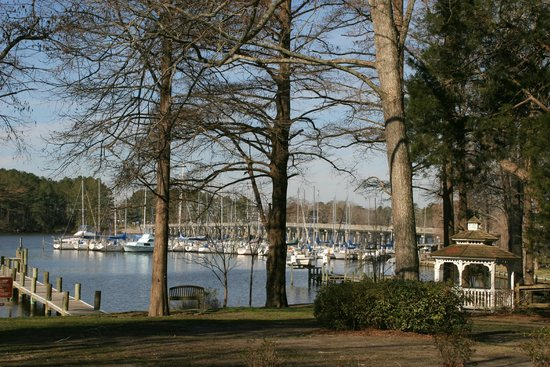
- Bath Creek and Marina

- Seal

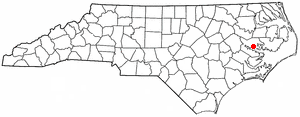
- Location of Bath, North Carolina

- Location within North Carolina Location within the United States Location within North America
- Coordinates: 35°28′13″N 76°48′43″W
- Country: United States
- State: North Carolina
- County: Beaufort
- Chartered: March 8, 1705
- Named for: Bath, England

Government
  - Type: Council–Manager
  - Council: Bath Town Council
  - Manager: Bubs Carson

Area
  - Total: 0.92 sq mi (2.37 km^{2})
  - Land: 0.36 sq mi (0.92 km^{2})
  - Water: 0.56 sq mi (1.45 km^{2})
- Elevation: 10 ft (3.0 m)

Population (2020)
  - Total: 245
  - Density: 686/sq mi (264.9/km^{2})
- Time zone: UTC-5 (Eastern (EST))
  - Summer (DST): UTC-4 (EDT)
- ZIP code: 27808
- Area code: 252
- FIPS code: 37-03840
- GNIS feature ID: 2405214
- Website: townofbathnc.com

Bath is a town in Beaufort County, North Carolina, United States. Located on the Pamlico River, it developed a trade in naval stores, furs, and tobacco. The population was 245 at the 2020 census. North Carolina's first town and port of entry, it was chartered on March 8, 1705.

Historically, Bath is often counted as North Carolina's first capital, as it was nominally so designated in 1712, when the Province of North Carolina was separated from the Province of Carolina and granted its own governor, though no permanent government institutions were located there. The capital was officially moved to Edenton in 1722, but the meetings of the General Assembly would still periodically occur in Bath in the 18th century. Bath was the site of Cary's Rebellion in 1711, and later served as one of many bases for notorious pirate Blackbeard. Bath waned in population, as its importance as both a port and government center were surpassed by the nearby city of New Bern. Bath's population fluctuated through the 20th and 21st centuries, but it has never exceeded 400 residents.

== History ==
European settlement near the Pamlico River in the 1690s led to the founding of Bath. The first settlers were mostly English farmers and French Huguenots (Protestants who went as refugees to England and Virginia); among those inhabitants was John Lawson, naturalist, explorer, and town father. The town was named after Bath, England by the English settlers who founded the town.

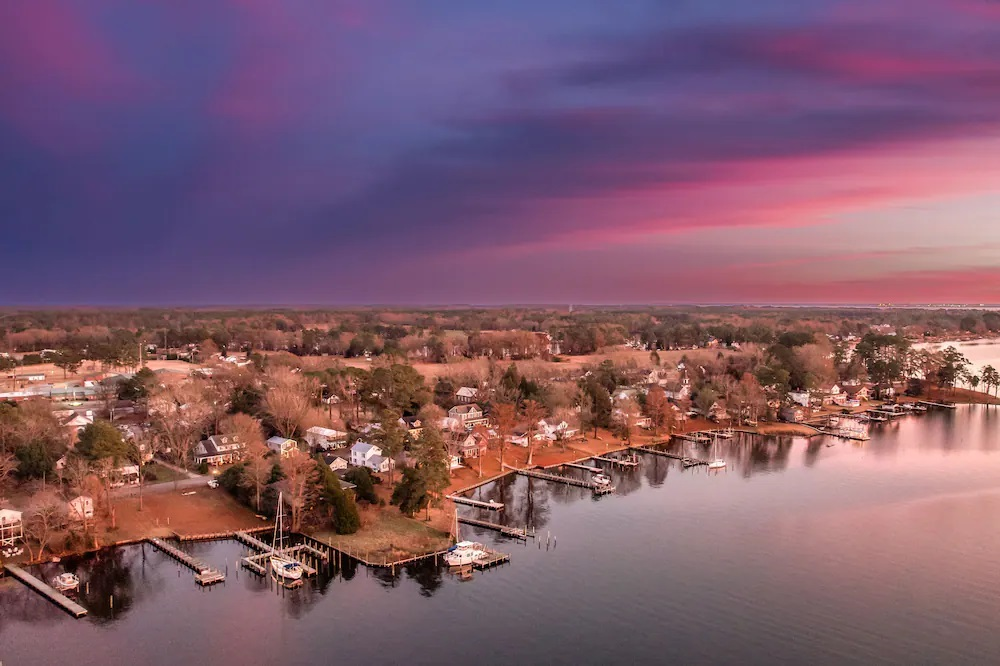
Aerial view of Bath at sunset

In 1708, Bath consisted of 12 houses and about 50 people. Early Bath was disturbed by political rivalries, epidemics, Indian wars (the Tuscarora War), and piracy. Residents suffered yellow fever, along with a severe drought in 1711. A war between the early settlers and the powerful Tuscarora Indians arose following the fever and drought, as the American Indians tried to push out the peoples encroaching on their territory. They attacked Bath, as well as plantations along the rivers, but by 1715 were defeated by a coalition of colonial settlers from the Carolinas and a much larger group of American Indians allied against them.

From 1705 until 1722, Bath was the first nominal capital of North Carolina; Edenton was designated next. The colony had no permanent institutions of government until their establishment of the new capital New Bern in 1743.

John Lawson was known as the town father. He documented the beauty and unique qualities of the town, laid out the town plan and helped secure its charter in 1705. On March 8, 1705, the tract of land was incorporated as the town of Bath by the General Assembly at a meeting at Capt. John Heckenfield's home in Albemarle. Lawson had laid out the town into 71 lots measuring 1/2 acre (2,000 m^{2}) and 4 rd (20 m) (Poles) (about a tenth of an acre). The lots were located on the waterfront; as was typical, this was the main transportation route. The bordering road is now known as Main Street. Early merchants had easy access by the water.

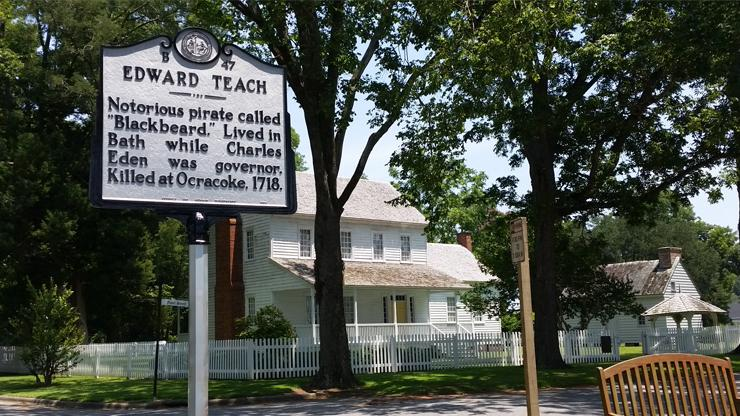
Blackbeard historic marker

Blackbeard the pirate was notorious in the southern colonies. He was a prominent figure by the time he settled briefly in Bath. He had conducted piracy off the East Coast and in the West Indies. He settled in Bath in 1718, gaining a royal pardon (these were offered by the Crown through colonial officials in an attempt to reduce piracy). He soon started piracy again, and was captured and executed later that year by Virginia forces. Bath was also the site of Cary's Rebellion in 1711.

During the Great Awakening in America, the English Methodist evangelist, George Whitefield, visited the town four times between 1747 and 1762 to preach the gospel. On his fourth visit, the Anglican church reportedly refused to allow him to preach. T. Jensen Lacy in his book, Amazing North Carolina, writes:

Whitfield finally gave up on converting Bath ... Just like the disciples of old, he drove his wagon to the outskirts of town, removed his shoes, shook the dirt from them, and put a curse on the town. He told onlookers that the Bible said people who couldn't get sinners to reform were to do just what he had done, and by shaking the dust of Bath from his shoes, the town would be cursed for its hardness of heart against the Word. Whitfield declared, "I say to the village of Bath, village you shall remain, now and forever, forgotten by men and nations until such time as it pleases God to turn the light of His countenance again upon you."

Development moved past Bath and the town lies almost entirely within the same boundaries laid out by its primary founder, John Lawson. The major business cities of North Carolina have developed in the Piedmont area, stimulated by construction of railroads and nineteenth-century textile mills. Bath has remained a sleepy little village on the North Carolina coast. By contrast, population has continued to increase in the county, reaching nearly 50,000 in 2010. But the area is being developed for retirement and second homes, making it strong in a service economy, but with mostly low-paying jobs.

== Geography ==
According to the United States Census Bureau, the town has a total area of 0.93 square miles (2.4 km^{2}), of which 0.35 square miles (0.9 km^{2}) is land and 0.54 square miles (1.4 km^{2}), or 60.99%, is water.

== Demographics ==
Historical population
Census	Pop.	Note	%±
1880	89		—
1900	400		—
1910	283		−29.2%
1920	274		−3.2%
1930	361		31.8%
1940	380		5.3%
1950	381		0.3%
1960	346		−9.2%
1970	231		−33.2%
1980	207		−10.4%
1990	154		−25.6%
2000	275		78.6%
2010	249		−9.5%
2020	245		−1.6%
U.S. Decennial Census

As of the census of 2000, there were 275 people, 122 households, and 86 families residing in the town. The population density was 759.0 inhabitants per square mile (293.1/km^{2}). There were 150 housing units at an average density of 414.0 per square mile (159.8/km^{2}). The racial makeup of the town was 95.64% White, 2.91% African American, 1.09% Native American, and 0.36% from other races. Hispanic or Latino of any race were 1.82% of the population.

There were 122 households, out of which 21.3% had children under the age of 18 living with them, 62.3% were married couples living together, 5.7% had a female householder with no husband present, and 29.5% were non-families. 27.0% of all households were made up of individuals, and 18.9% had someone living alone who was 65 years of age or older. The average household size was 2.25 and the average family size was 2.73.

In the town, the population was spread out, with 19.6% under the age of 18, 3.3% from 18 to 24, 21.1% from 25 to 44, 32.0% from 45 to 64, and 24.0% who were 65 years of age or older. The median age was 49 years. For every 100 females, there were 92.3 males. For every 100 females age 18 and over, there were 88.9 males.

The median income for a household in the town was $50,625, and the median income for a family was $58,125. Males had a median income of $45,625 versus $23,958 for females. The per capita income for the town was $23,029. About 8.0% of families and 8.2% of the population were below the poverty line, including 13.8% of those under the age of eighteen and 11.3% of those 65 or over.

== Economy ==
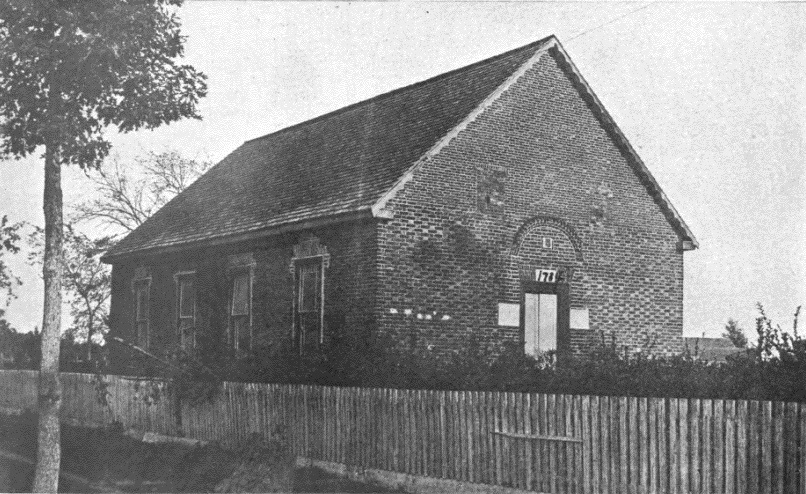
St. Thomas Church, c. 1908

Bath has changed little since the colonial and early federal period. People interested in heritage tourism have made it a destination for both locals of eastern North Carolina and visitors from other regions. Tourists swell the population during the summer. Favorite water-based recreation includes wakeboarding, water skiing, and boat rides or jet ski rides through the creek down to the river.

Other attractions include the Historic Bath State Historic Site, which gives tours of the old town of Bath; St. Thomas Church, the oldest standing Episcopal Church in North Carolina; historical houses; and a visitors center. A ferry route provides service from the northern shore of the Pamlico River to the southern shore of the river. Visitors to Goose Creek State Park can see and learn about the beautiful marshes and swamps along the Pamlico River and Goose Creek; they can rent canoes as well as fish from the shores of the river.

In addition to the Bath Historic District and St. Thomas Church, the Bath School, Bonner House, and Palmer-Marsh House are listed on the National Register of Historic Places.

== Arts and culture ==
BHM Regional Library operates the Bath Community Library.

== Education ==
Beaufort County Schools operates area public schools. Bath Elementary School is the local K-8 school, and Northside High School is the local high school.

== In popular culture ==
- Edna Ferber wrote Show Boat, featuring a Bath setting. She was inspired by her own visit to the showboat James Adams Floating Theatre when it visited Bath Creek during the spring of 1925. Her novel featured an interracial relationship and issues related to a mixed-race person during the period of racial segregation in the South. The novel was adapted as a film and as a musical produced on Broadway.

== See also ==
- List of municipalities in North Carolina
- National Register of Historic Places listings in Beaufort County, North Carolina
