= Bonner House (Bath, North Carolina) =

Historic house in North Carolina, United States

- U.S. National Register of Historic Places
- U.S. Historic district – Contributing property
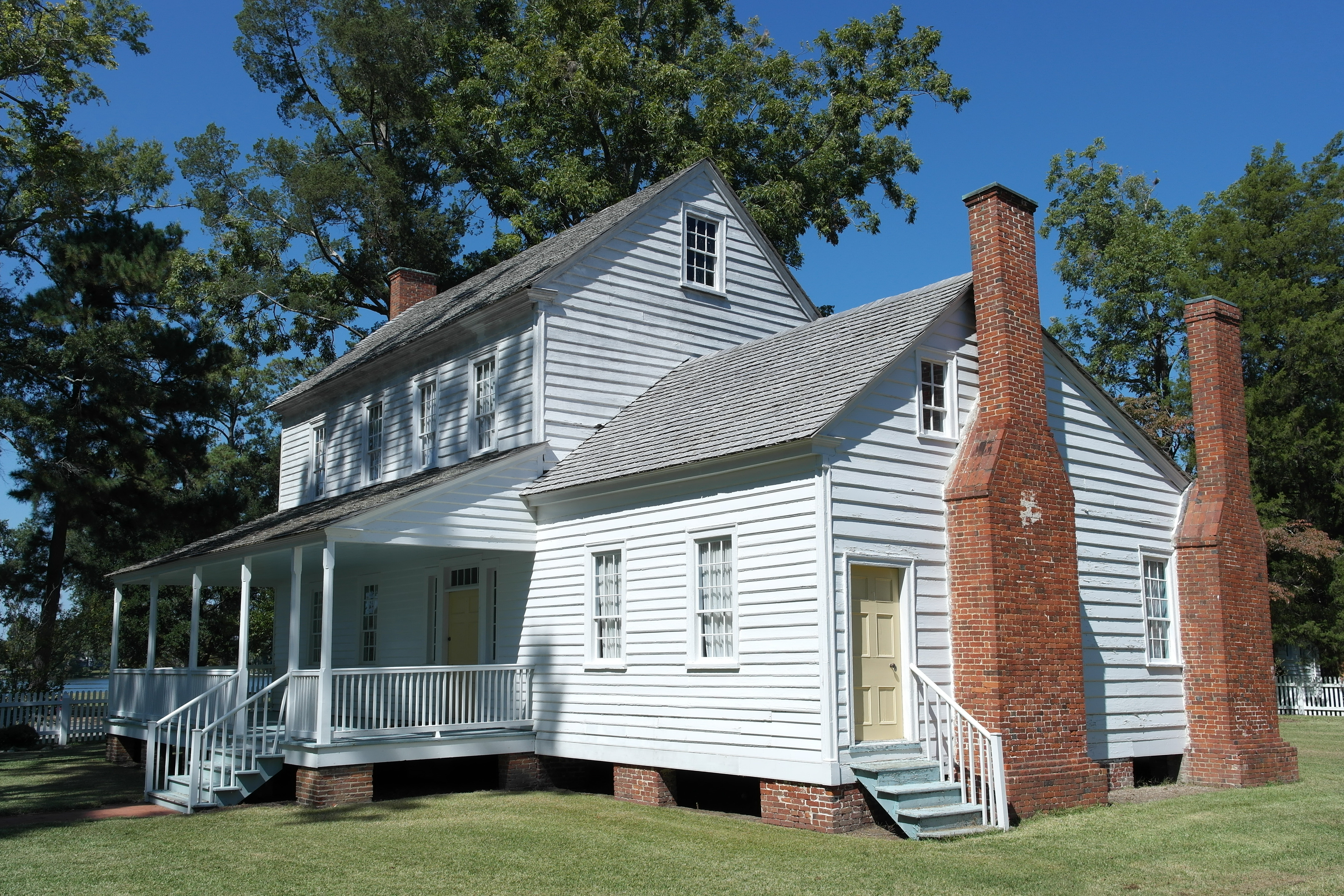

- Location within North Carolina Location within the United States
- Location: Front St., Bath, North Carolina
- Coordinates: 35°28′20″N 76°48′49″W
- Built: 1835
- Part of: Bath Historic District (ID70000437)
- NRHP reference No.: 70000438
- Added to NRHP: February 26, 1970

Bonner House is a historic home located at Bath, Beaufort County, North Carolina. It was built about 1835, and is a two-story frame dwelling with a one-story wing and rear shed addition. It sits on a brick pier foundation and has a side-hall plan. It is on land once owned by John Lawson (1674? – 1711), explorer and founder of Bath.

It is a contributing property in the NRHP-listed Bath Historic District, also known as Historic Bath, and is now an 1830s period historic house museum. The mid-18th century period Palmer-Marsh House can also be toured.

It was listed on the National Register of Historic Places (NRHP) in 1970.
