= Washington Historic District (Washington, North Carolina) =

Historic district in North Carolina, United States

- U.S. National Register of Historic Places
- U.S. Historic district
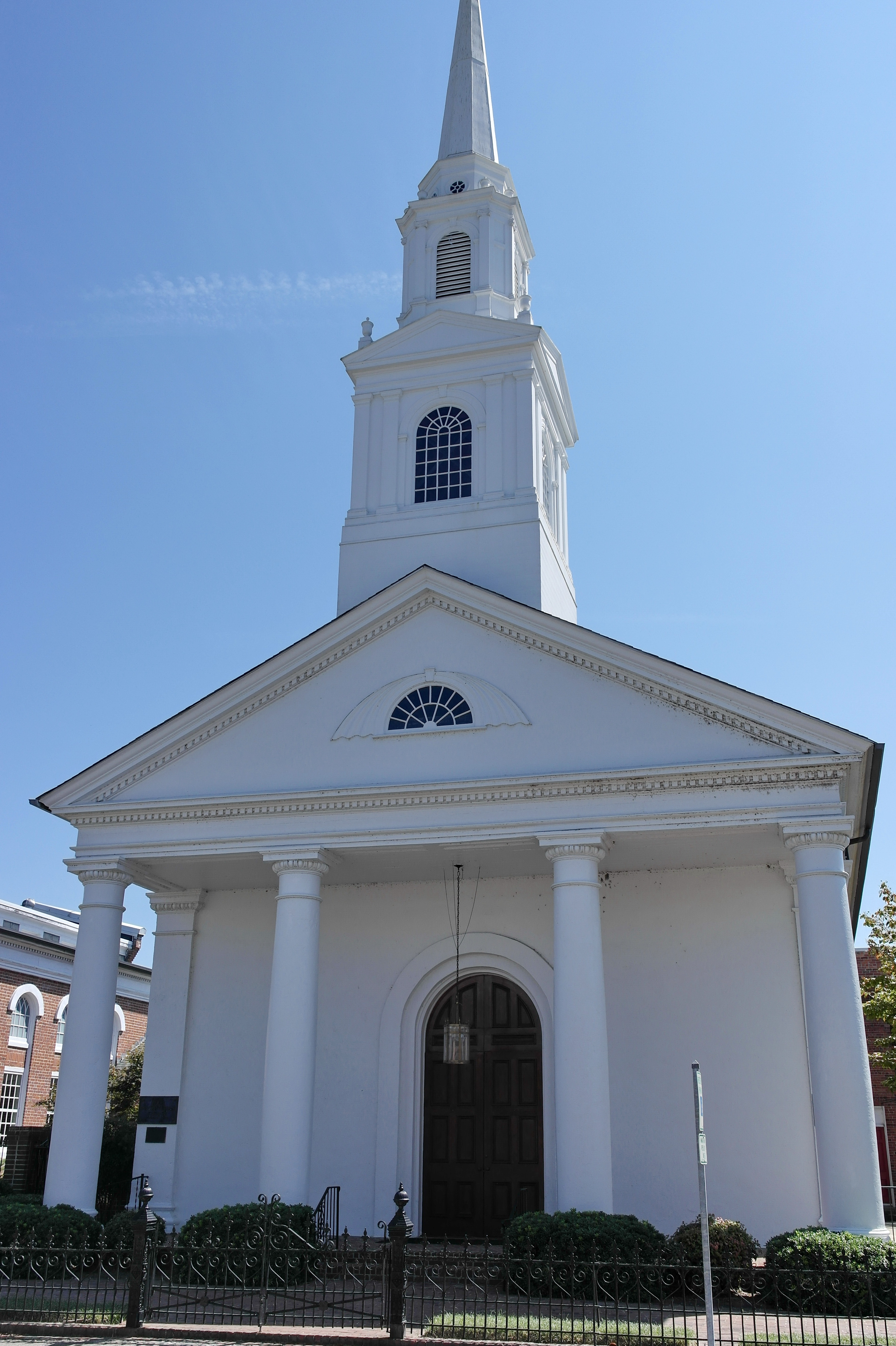
- First Presbyterian Church

- Location within North Carolina Location within the United States
- Location: Roughly bounded by Jacks Creek, Pamlico River, Hackney, 3rd, Market, 5th, Harvey, and 2nd Sts., Washington, North Carolina
- Coordinates: 35°32′37″N 77°03′17″W
- Area: 214 acres (87 ha)
- Built: c. 1790
- Architectural style: Mixed (more Than 2 Styles From Different Periods)
- NRHP reference No.: 79001661
- Added to NRHP: February 9, 1979

Washington Historic District is a national historic district located at Washington, Beaufort County, North Carolina. It encompasses 512 contributing buildings and one contributing structure in the town of Washington. They include a variety of institutional, commercial, and residential buildings primarily dating from the late 19th and early 20th centuries. Notable buildings include the Beaufort County Courthouse, Havens and Fowle warehouses, Mayo Law Office (c. 1830), Marsh House, Myers House, Hyatt House, Griffin House, Rodman House, Elmwood, Firehouse and City Hall (c. 1884), Post Office and Federal Courthouse (1913), railroad station, Presbyterian church, Saint Peter's Episcopal Church, First Methodist Church (1899), Singleton Primitive Baptist Church (c. 1880), Blount-Bragaw Building (1901-1904), Minor House, and George T. Leach House (c. 1890).

It was listed on the National Register of Historic Places in 1978.

== See also ==
- National Register of Historic Places listings in Beaufort County, North Carolina
