= James C. MacRae =

American judge (1838–1909)

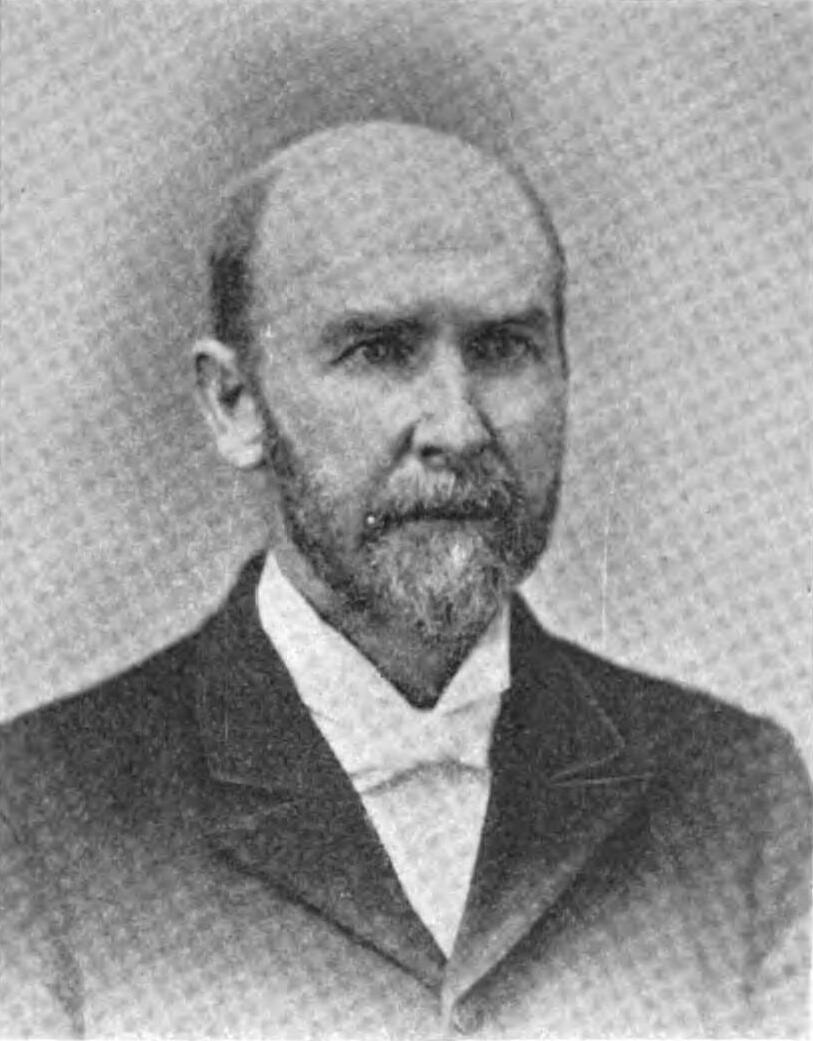
- Born: 6 October 1838; Fayetteville
- Died: 17 October 1909 (aged 71); Chapel Hill
- Occupation: Judge, politician
- Position held: Associate Justice of the North Carolina Supreme Court

James Cameron MacRae (October 6, 1838 – October 17, 1909) was a justice of the North Carolina Supreme Court from 1892 to 1895.

Born near Fayetteville, North Carolina, MacRae attended Donaldson Academy, and thereafter taught for two years while reading law to gain admission to the bar in 1859. Shortly thereafter, the American Civil War began, and in May 1861, MacRae enlisted in the Confederate States Army, serving first with the 1st North Carolina Volunteers, and then with the 5th North Carolina State Regiment. He served for four years, achieving the rank of major. After the war, he returned to the practice of law in Cumberland County, North Carolina, and was elected to the North Carolina House of Representatives from 1874 to 1875. He was appointed as a judge of the Superior Court in 1882, and elevated to the state supreme court in 1892, to a seat vacated by the death of Joseph J. Davis.

Following his court service, MacRae was dean of the University of North Carolina School of Law from 1900 until his death at the age of 71, following a lengthy battle with heart disease.

Political offices
Preceded by Joseph J. Davis	Justice of the North Carolina Supreme Court; 1892–1895	Succeeded by Walter A. Montgomery
