= Belhaven Commercial Historic District =

Historic district in North Carolina, United States

- U.S. National Register of Historic Places
- U.S. Historic district
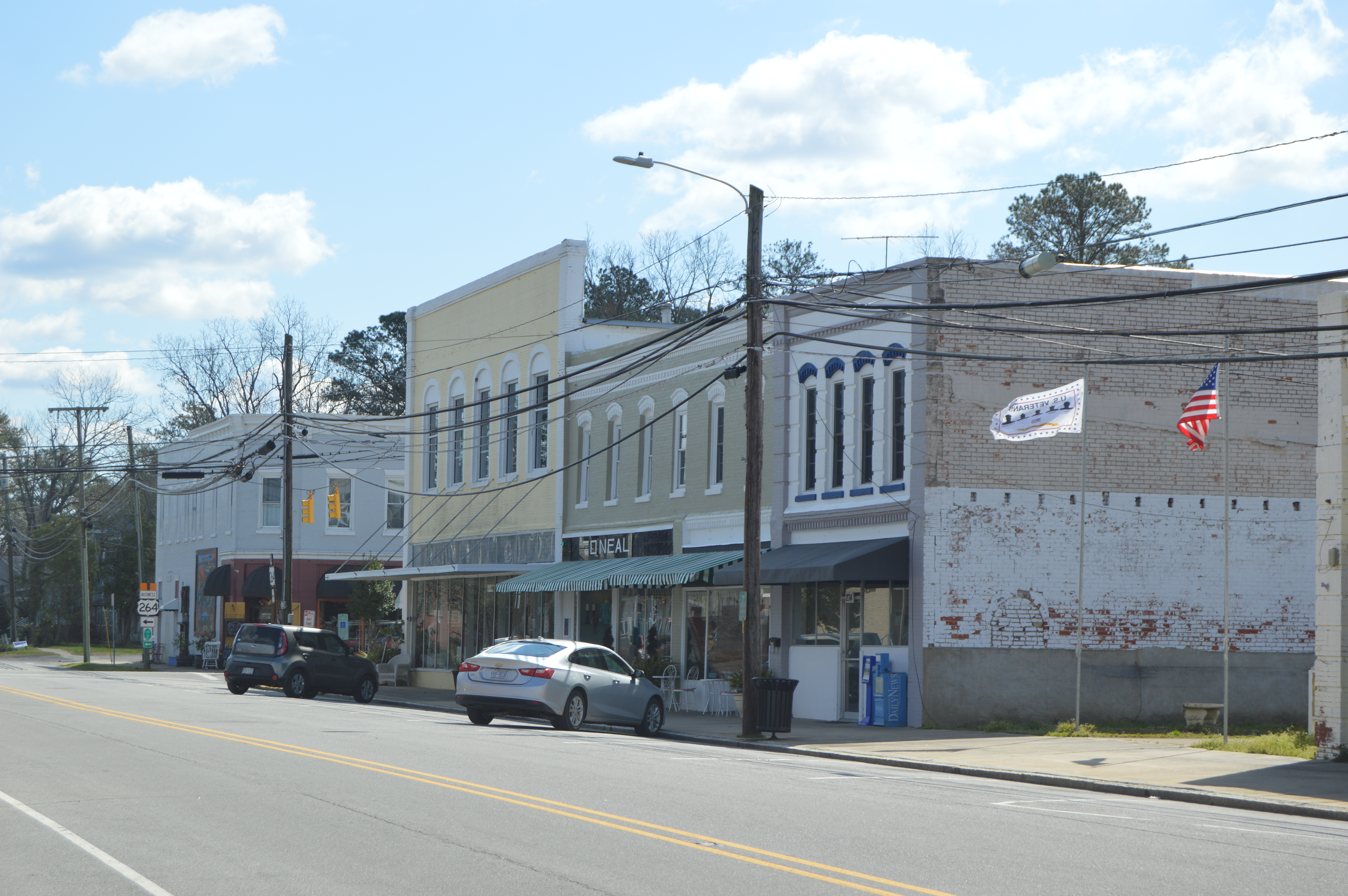
- Main Street buildings

- Location within North Carolina Location within the United States
- Location: 260-292 E. Main and 246-288, 251-279 Pamlico Sts., Belhaven, North Carolina
- Coordinates: 35°32′17″N 76°37′14″W
- Area: 5 acres (2.0 ha)
- Built: c. 1910
- NRHP reference No.: 15000180
- Added to NRHP: April 24, 2015

The Belhaven Commercial Historic District encompasses a portion of the downtown area of Belhaven, North Carolina, that was developed between about 1910 and 1965. Located on one block of Pamlico and two of East Main Street, it includes thirteen buildings from that time period. Most of them are built of brick, and are one or two stories in height. The Cameo Theater (c. 1915) is a three-story structure in the district.

The district was listed on the National Register of Historic Places in 2015.

== See also ==
- National Register of Historic Places listings in Beaufort County, North Carolina
