= North Carolina Estuarium =

American science museum

Coordinates: 35°32′24″N 77°3′13″W

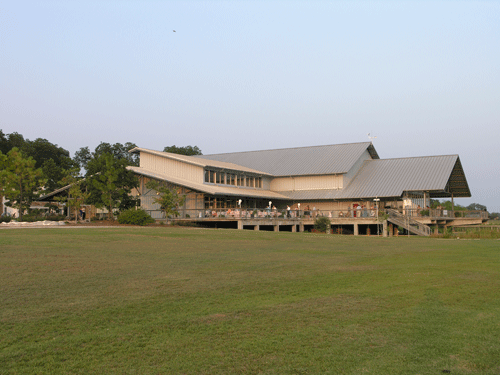

The North Carolina Estuarium is a natural science museum / environmental education center on the Pamlico River in downtown Washington, North Carolina featuring exhibits and artwork. The North Carolina Estuarium is the world's first aquarium that is focused on estuary systems. An estuary is a type of marine life habitat that forms where fresh and saltwater mix. The museum/aquarium opened in 1998. The North Carolina Estuarium sits on the banks of the Pamlico River, which is a part of the Albermarle-Pamlico Estuary system, which is the second largest estuary system in America. The NC Estuarium is open Tuesday-Saturday, 10:30 AM-3:30 pm. Currently, there is a $5 adult admission to the museum, as well as $3 for students ages 5-17, and kids 4 & under are free.

The Estuarium has more than 200 scientific and historic exhibits on the ecology of North Carolina's estuaries, the Tar-Pamlico River, and the Pamlico Sound. Visitors can also walk a 3/4 mile boardwalk alongside the Pamlico River, right outside the grounds of the museum. The lobby features a large driftwood art sculpture built by local Washington resident, Whiting Toler, that is a mechanical recreation of the water cycle in North Carolina, essentially demonstrating how water flows/moves through the state. Other exhibits cover ecology, wildlife including blue crabs, historical artifacts, and environmental concerns such as hurricanes.

The address for the North Carolina Estuarium is 223 East Water Street. There is free, street parking available. There is a free, educational pontoon boat ride offered as 7 trips a week, Wednesday-Saturday, April-November. There is one trip at 10 AM and one trip at 12 PM, Wednesday-Friday, and then one boat ride trip on Saturday at 10 AM. There is no set-cost for these boat rides, but donations are gladly accepted to support the museum as well as the programs put on throughout the year at the museum. The small pontoon boat ride only can fit 10 people at a time, so you must call, in advance, to reserve one of these few spots. The boat trips may be booked anywhere from a couple of days in advance, to a week, or even booked up to a month in advance in the high tourism season in the summertime, due to the popularity of the program and the small capacity of the pontoon boat. The museum asks that you call the museum's direct phone line to make reservations for the educational pontoon boat ride. Currently, there is no online sign ups for the boat ride or online ticket sales for the museum. Everything is purchased, in person, on the day of your trip.

== See also ==
- List of natural history museums in the United States
