= Belfont Plantation House =

Historic house in North Carolina, United States

- U.S. National Register of Historic Places
- Location within North Carolina Location within the United States
- Location: 275 Robersonville Rd, Washington, NC 27889
- Coordinates: 35°37′6″N 77°8′14″W
- Area: 9 acres (3.6 ha)
- Built: 1700-1799
- Architectural style: Georgian
- NRHP reference No.: 76001305
- Added to NRHP: December 12, 1976

Belfont Plantation House is a historic plantation house located near Latham, Beaufort County, North Carolina. It dates to the 18th century, and is a two-story, Georgian style frame dwelling. It features a pair of double-shouldered exterior end chimneys joined by a two-story brick pent.

It was listed on the National Register of Historic Places in 1976.
