= Pantego, North Carolina =

- Town
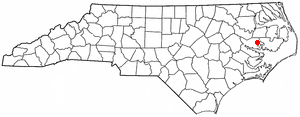
- Location of Pantego, North Carolina
- Coordinates: 35°35′15″N 76°39′34″W
- Country: United States
- State: North Carolina
- County: Beaufort

Area
  - Total: 0.80 sq mi (2.08 km^{2})
  - Land: 0.80 sq mi (2.08 km^{2})
  - Water: 0 sq mi (0.00 km^{2})
- Elevation: 0 ft (0 m)

Population (2020)
  - Total: 164
  - Density: 204.3/sq mi (78.88/km^{2})
- Time zone: UTC-5 (Eastern (EST))
  - Summer (DST): UTC-4 (EDT)
- ZIP code: 27860
- Area code: 252
- FIPS code: 37-50080
- GNIS feature ID: 2407072

Pantego is a town in Beaufort County, North Carolina, United States. The population was 164 at the 2020 census.

== Geography ==
According to the United States Census Bureau, the town has a total area of 0.8 square miles (2.1 km^{2}), all land.

== Demographics ==
Historical population
Census	Pop.	Note	%±
1880	71		—
1890	151		112.7%
1900	150		−0.7%
1910	324		116.0%
1920	335		3.4%
1930	329		−1.8%
1940	29		−91.2%
1950	275		848.3%
1960	262		−4.7%
1970	218		−16.8%
1980	185		−15.1%
1990	171		−7.6%
2000	170		−0.6%
2010	179		5.3%
2020	164		−8.4%
U.S. Decennial Census

As of the census of 2000, there were 170 people, 155 households, and 6 families residing in the town. The population density was 212.3 inhabitants per square mile (82.0/km^{2}). There were 78 housing units at an average density of 97.4 per square mile (37.6/km^{2}). The racial makeup of the town was 80.00% White, 17.65% African American, 1.76% from other races, and 0.59% from two or more races. Hispanic or Latino of any race were 1.76% of the population.

There were 65 households, out of which 33.8% had children under the age of 18 living with them, 61.5% were married couples living together, 12.3% had a female householder with no husband present, and 24.6% were non-families. 23.1% of all households were made up of individuals, and 13.8% had someone living alone who was 65 years of age or older. The average household size was 2.62 and the average family size was 3.06.

In the town, the population was spread out, with 25.9% under the age of 18, 5.3% from 18 to 24, 22.4% from 25 to 44, 30.0% from 45 to 64, and 16.5% who were 65 years of age or older. The median age was 44 years. For every 100 females, there were 88.9 males. For every 100 females age 18 and over, there were 85.3 males.

The median income for a household in the town was $41,250, and the median income for a family was $41,750. Males had a median income of $28,750 versus $25,750 for females. The per capita income for the town was $18,030. About 4.9% of families and 7.9% of the population were below the poverty line, including 5.0% of those under the age of eighteen and 35.7% of those 65 or over.

== History ==
The town formerly had a school named Pantego High School. The town was hit by a tornado in 1991, and another on October 11, 2002, the latter an F2 tornado that was spawned by Hurricane Kyle, and destroyed two houses and a farm. The most recent tornado, rated EF2, was on April 7, 2014. It rolled along Pantego Creek, ran along one of its canals, Cuckold's Creek, and almost hit a railroad bridge and Highway 264, it took a turn, hit through a small marsh, split a house in half, and threw a truck over 40 feet high and threw it in a nearby field, the two occurred five feet from each other, the tornado then curved into a forest, destroying a Hardee's billboard, and rolled across the Cuckold's Creek again, and it slid along a field, until it curved into four houses on one side of the road, turned, hit another house across the street, hit another field. A man in a plane flew over the field it crossed, and he saw curved and grooves in the dirt, revealing "arcs" in the field suggesting it was a multiple-vortex tornado. It also hit a two-story house, taking the top floor off the house, and leaving the bottom floor, continued until it hit a house in Ponzer, approximately 15 miles from Pantego, and leveled that house. Marc Van Essendelf, his seven children, and his wife, who was eight months pregnant, hid in a ditch; the house was splintered and obliterated. There was a near-miss with another tornado that hit Whichard's Beach and Washington. It was the first EF-3 tornado of the 2014 season, and it almost continued into Pantego.

The Pantego Academy was listed on the National Register of Historic Places in 1984.
