= Walter A. Montgomery =

American judge (1845–1921)

Walter Alexander Montgomery

Associate Justice of the North Carolina Supreme Court
- In office 1895–1905
- Succeeded by: George H. Brown

Personal details
- Born: February 17, 1845 Raleigh, North Carolina, U.S.
- Died: November 26, 1921 (aged 76) Raleigh, North Carolina, U.S.
- Resting place: Historic Oakwood Cemetery
- Spouse: Lizzie Holman Wilson
- Education: Warrenton Academy
- Profession: Lawyer

Military service
- Allegiance: Confederate States of America
- Branch/service: Confederate States Army
- Years of service: 1861–1865
- Rank: Second Lieutenant
- Unit: 2nd North Carolina Volunteers
- Battles/wars: American Civil War

Walter Alexander Montgomery (February 17, 1845 – November 26, 1921) was a Confederate soldier in the American Civil War, and later a lawyer and a justice of the North Carolina Supreme Court from 1895 to 1905.

== Early life and military service ==
Born in Warrenton, North Carolina, to Thomas Alexander and Darian Dawson Cheek Montgomery, Montgomery's father "owned many slaves" and "supported the cause of Secession with all his heart". Montgomery enlisted during the Civil War at the age of sixteen, joining the 1st North Carolina Cavalry Regiment in 1861. He was "discharged because of physical disability" a month later, having been diagnosed by a military doctor as having consumption due to his small size and apparent frailty, but shortly thereafter traveled to Norfolk, Virginia, and reenlisted with the Second North Carolina Volunteers. He achieved the rank of sergeant in 1862 and second lieutenant in 1864.

His participation in the war is described as encompassing a number of notable battles:

He was in the Battle of Hanover Courthouse in May, 1862, at Fredericksburg in December, 1862, and participated in the sauguinary Battle of Chancellorsville, where he was wounded, and at Brandy Station on the 9th of June, 1863. A month later he fought on the first day of the Battle of Gettysburg, and there again was wounded. In the closing month of that year he was at Kelly ’s Ford, and Mine Run. In 1864 he participated in the battles of the Wilderness, Spottsylvania Court House, Winchester and Belle Grove. He was at the Hatcher's Run battle on the 6th of February, 1865, and in March, 1865, he was in the trenches at Petersburg. He participated in the famous sortie under General Gordon on March 25, 1865, and was in the fight at Sailor's Creek on the 6th day of April, 1865. He followed with the armies of Lee until the surrender at Appomattox, where he was paroled.

== Legal and judicial career ==
After the war, which had financially ruined his family, Montgomery briefly worked as a travelling entertainer. He attended Warrenton Academy, and studied law under William Eaton, Jr., who had been Attorney General of North Carolina. Montgomery was admitted to the bar in 1867, and became county attorney for Warrenton until the office was abolished the following year. He also working as an editor for the Warrenton Courier, and starting his own newspaper, The Living Present.

He practiced in Memphis, Tennessee, from 1873 to 1876, then returned from to Warrenton to practice from 1876 to 1893, when he moved to Raleigh, North Carolina, where he remained in practice until his election to a vacated seat on the Supreme Court in 1894. In 1896, he was elected for the full term of eight years, serving until January 1905, and authoring a number of well-regarded opinions. He then returned to private practice, also serving by appointment as a standing master for the United States Circuit Court for the Eastern District of North Carolina.

== Personal ==
On September 27, 1871, Montgomery married Lizzie Holman Wilson, in Roanoke, Virginia. They had four children. Montgomery died in Raleigh and was buried in the Historic Oakwood Cemetery.

Political offices
Preceded by James C. MacRae	Justice of the North Carolina Supreme Court; 1894–1905	Succeeded by George H. Brown
