= Bath Historic District (Bath, North Carolina) =

Historic district in North Carolina, United States

- U.S. National Register of Historic Places
- U.S. Historic district
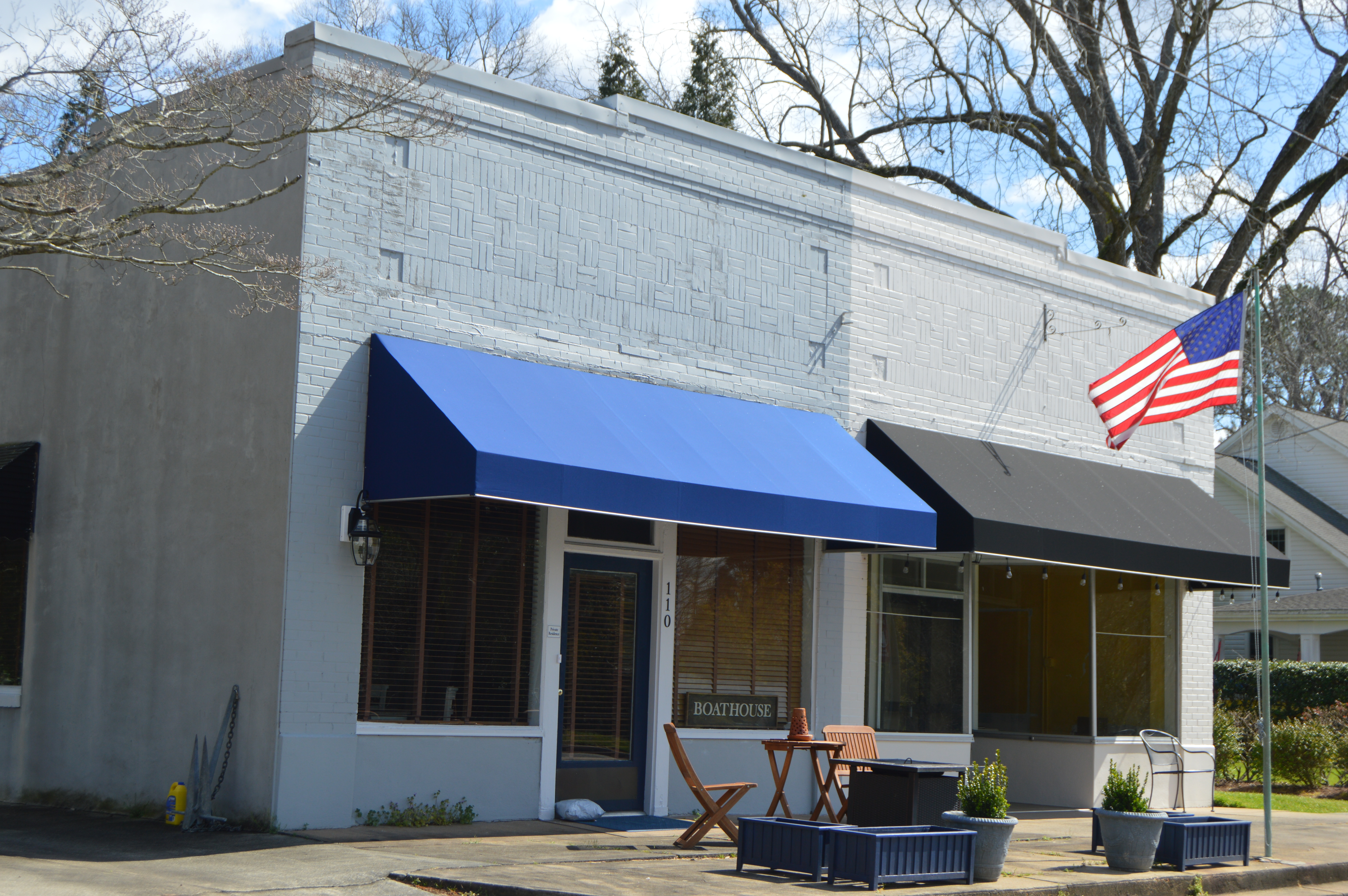
- Commercial buildings on Main Street
- Location: Bounded by Bath Creek, North Carolina Highway 92, and King St., Bath, North Carolina
- Coordinates: 35°28′33″N 76°48′50″W
- Area: 80 acres (32 ha)
- Built: 1730
- NRHP reference No.: 70000437
- Added to NRHP: February 26, 1970

Bath Historic District is a historic district in Bath, Beaufort County, North Carolina. The district is now a North Carolina Historic Site belonging to the North Carolina Department of Natural and Cultural Resources and known as Historic Bath, and includes a visitor center offering guided tours of the Bonner House and Palmer-Marsh House, which is also a National Historic Landmark. Visitors can also tour the Van der Veer House and St. Thomas Episcopal Church.

It was listed on the National Register of Historic Places in 1970.
