= Palmer-Marsh House =

Historic house in North Carolina, United States

- U.S. National Register of Historic Places
- U.S. National Historic Landmark
- U.S. Historic district – Contributing property
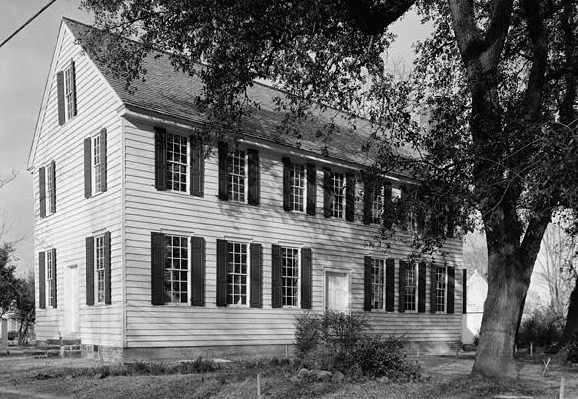
- Palmer-Marsh House in 1962

- Location within North Carolina Location within the United States
- Location: Main St., S of NC 92, Bath, North Carolina
- Coordinates: 35°28′35.95″N 76°48′51″W
- Area: 1.6 acres (0.65 ha)
- Built: 1751
- Architectural style: Colonial
- Part of: Bath Historic District (ID70000437)
- NRHP reference No.: 70000439

Significant dates
- Added to NRHP: February 26, 1970
- Designated NHL: April 15, 1970
- Designated CP: February 26, 1970

The Palmer-Marsh House is a historic house museum and National Historic Landmark on Main Street south of Carteret Street in Bath, North Carolina. Built in 1751, it is one of the oldest residences in North Carolina, and is a well-preserved example of a large colonial town house. It was declared a National Historic Landmark in 1970. It is now a North Carolina state historic site, and is open for tours.

== Description and history ==
The Palmer-Marsh House is located in the center of Bath, on the east side of South Main Street just south of its junction with Carteret Street (North Carolina Highway 92). It is a 2 1/2-story wood-frame structure, with a gabled roof, clapboard siding, and a brick-faced foundation. It is oriented facing south, with a seven-bay facade that has a center entrance with minimal trim. The other facades have secondary entrances at their centers. The secondary entrance on the street-facing west side opens into a large chamber that extends the full depth of the house, with a parlor and study continuing across the front. The interior retains some original features, including wide pine floors and exposed timber framing. The east gable end of the building features a notably large double chimney of English bond, 16ft wide and 4ft deep, joined by a 2-story brick structure with windows that open into small interior closets between the two chimneys.

The house was built in 1751 by Michael Coutanche, a wealthy merchant and legislator who had come to North Carolina from the Isle of Jersey. In later years this space is also said to have played host to the colonial legislature when it met in Bath. In the 1760s it was purchased by Robert Palmer, who served as the royal collector of the port, and was on the governor's council. In 1802 the house was purchased by brothers Jonathan and Daniel Gould Marsh, whose family owned it until 1915. It underwent restoration by Historic Bath in 1960–62, and was given to the state in 1963; it has served as a museum property ever since.

== See also ==
- List of the oldest buildings in North Carolina
- List of National Historic Landmarks in North Carolina
- National Register of Historic Places listings in Beaufort County, North Carolina
