= Zion Episcopal Church (Talbotton, Georgia) =

Historic church in Georgia, United States

- U.S. National Register of Historic Places
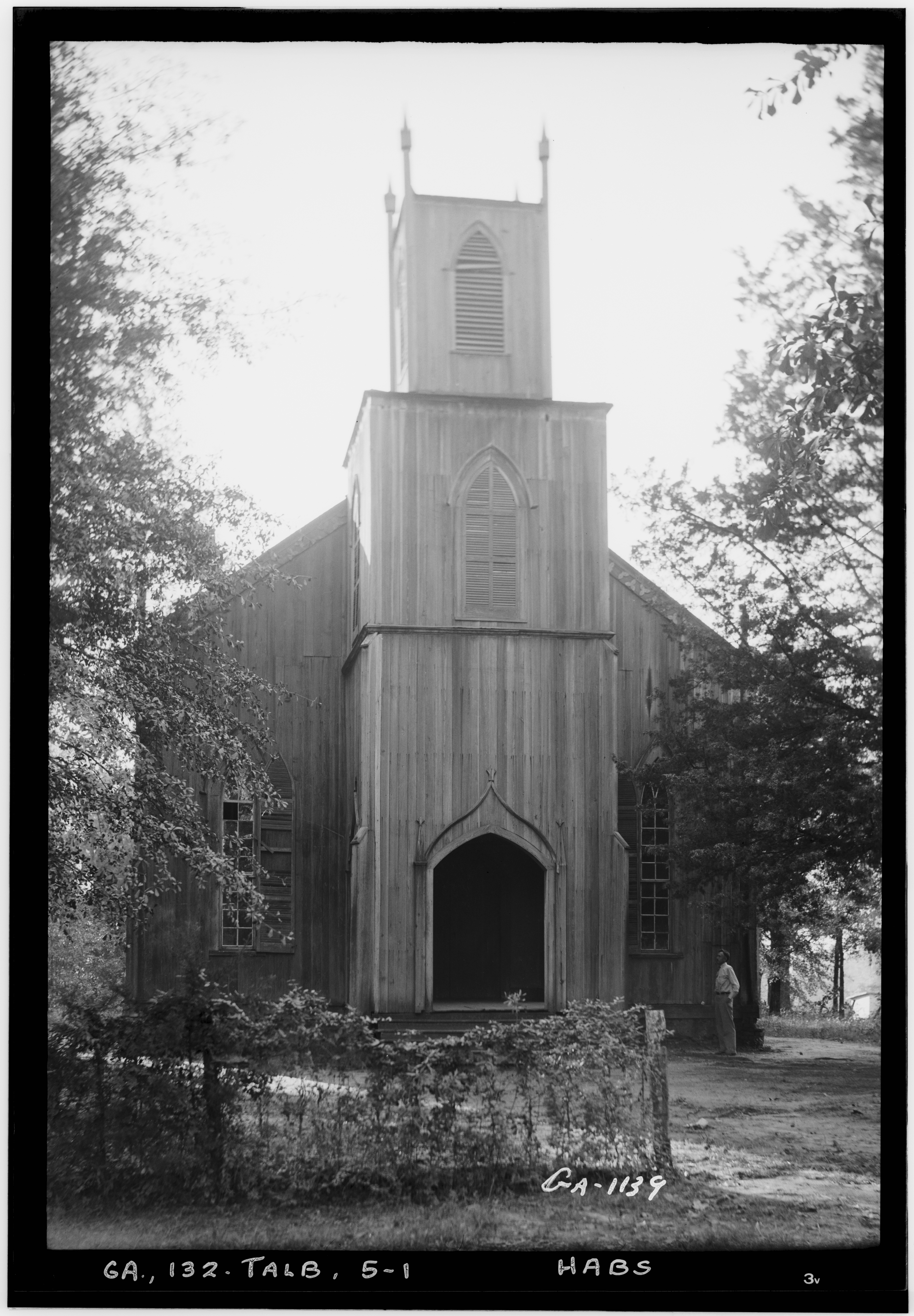
- West entrance and tower of Zion Episcopal Church in 1936.

- Location within the United States Location within Georgia
- Coordinates: 32°40′28″N 84°32′23″W
- Built: 1848-1853
- Architect: Richard Upjohn
- Architectural style: Gothic Revival architecture, Carpenter Gothic
- Website: Official website
- NRHP reference No.: 74000702
- Added to NRHP: May 8, 1974

Zion Episcopal Church (consecrated 1853) is a historic Episcopal parish church founded in 1847 in Talbotton, Georgia, the county seat of Talbot County. It is a fine and unusual example of the English Tudor and carpenter-gothic style, influenced by Richard Upjohn, in a rural southern setting. The church was funded by wealthy planters from coastal Georgia and South Carolina who had created an unusually affluent community on the southern frontier by settling together in the forested piedmont of the Chattahoochee Valley –formerly remote Muscogee-Creek territory. The church today, although lacking a regular congregation, is maintained as a chapel by St. Nicholas Episcopal Church in nearby Hamilton, which hosts services in the space regularly.

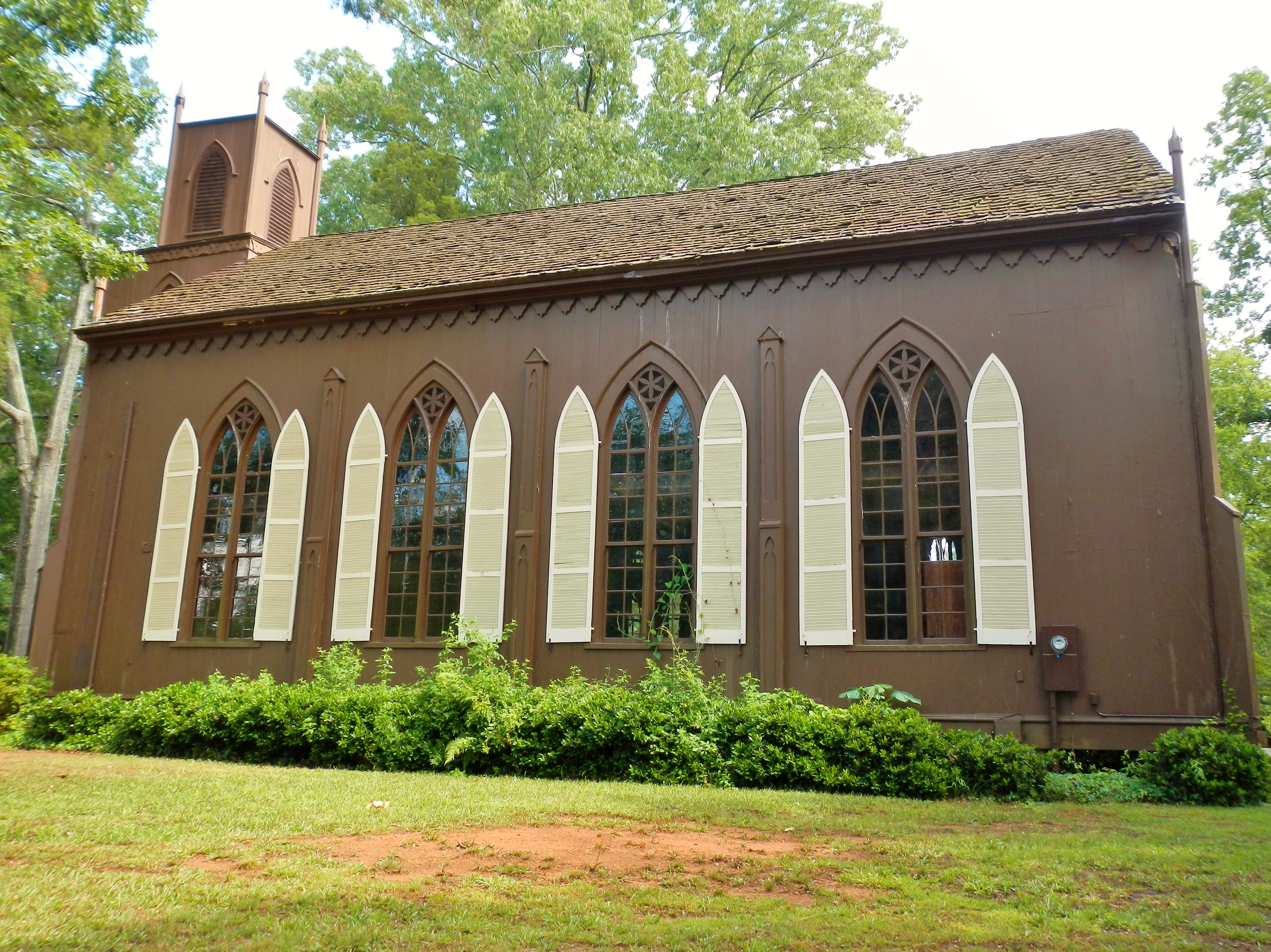
Lancet windows and Carpenter gothic at Zion Episcopal Church.

== History ==
Zion Episcopal, much like other Southern planter churches and chapels of ease, is a notable confluence of both the wealth and fashion of southern planter societies, and of the simplicity and locality of rural southern religious buildings. The church was built in 1848 and consecrated in 1853, as a mission of the then-single Diocese of Georgia, under the leadership of the Rev. Richard Johnson —who is sometimes quoted in his journaling of travel across the deep south and southwest. Funded by Talbotton's unusually frontier-eager planter elite, and by rice planters whom Johnson had served in South Carolina, the building is a perfect survival of an international architectural movement that saw its own provincial manifestation in the backcountry of the old southern frontier.

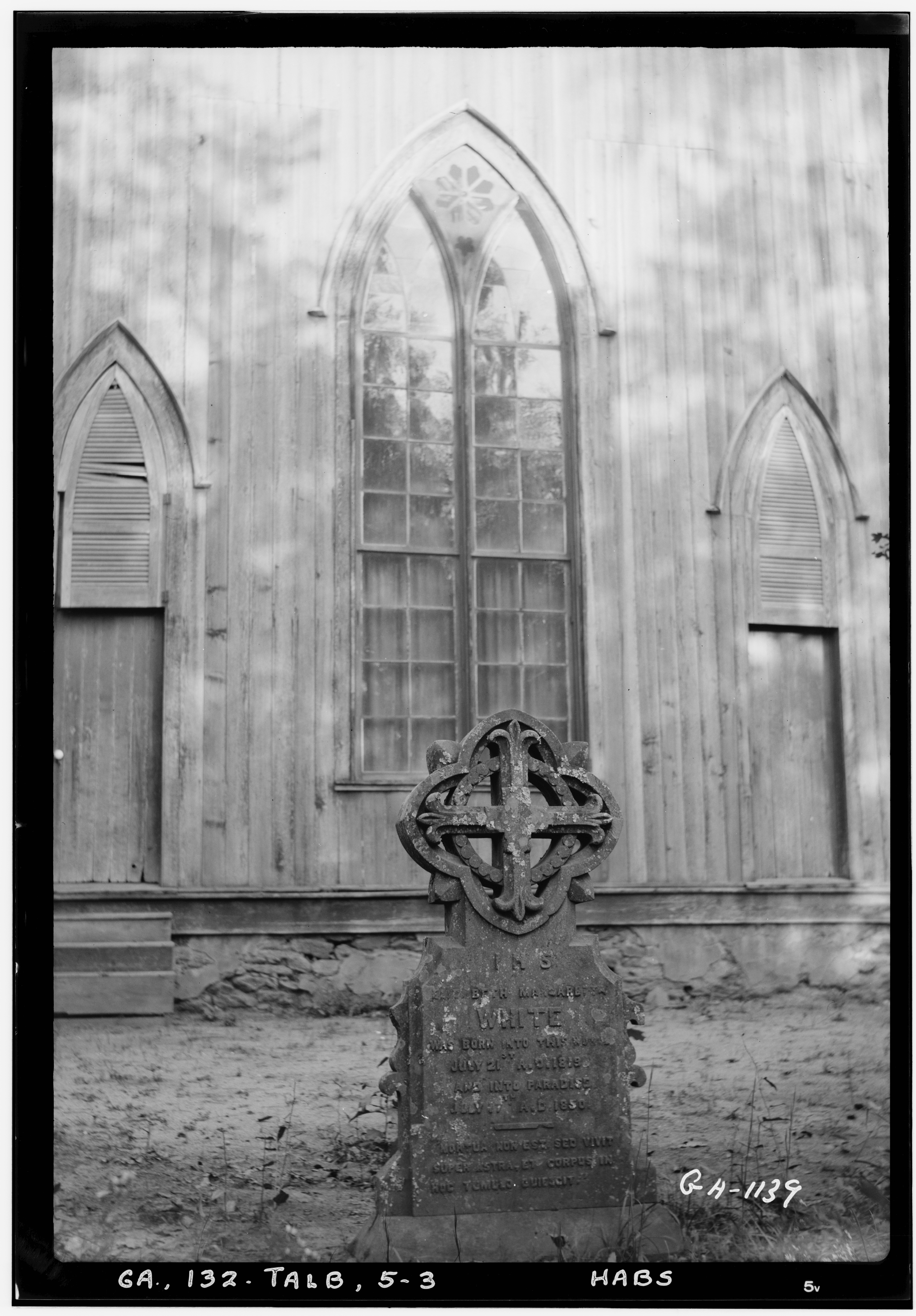
Exterior of the East Window, 1936.

=== Architecture ===
Zion Episcopal Church is considered to be an excellent and early example of English country Tudor revival. Built in the neo-gothic architecture that was increasingly the desired style of the mid 19th century, it was probably inspired by the designs of Richard Upjohn, the architect most famously of Trinity Church Wall Street, which became popular by the dispersal of his book: Upjohn's Rural Architecture. The one room church is built of vertical boards, and features a central three-part bell tower, a gallery built for the slaves of worshipping planters, and lancet windows with plantation shutters. It is built completely out of local Heart Pine, with nails and iron from a Talbotton blacksmith and unpainted, giving it a deeply dim and rural look. And, while bearing a relationship to Richard Upjohn's designs, it stands apart in its particularly Tudor style, with perpendicular carpentry arches supporting the galleries, decorative battlements, and a trefoil theme in the pitched roof. The interior firings, namely the altar, communion rail, box pews, lectern and pulpit, are all built from native Walnut, and the ceiling beams are rare white cedar logs cut from Talbot County forests. The organ, made by Pilcher, was installed in the west end on the gallery in 1850 and is still working condition. It is the oldest and only working hand-pumped Pilcher organ in the United States. The Church stands in an oak and cedar grove in the LeVert Historic District of Talbotton —dominated by large neo-classical columned plantation houses. The large and deliberate slave gallery, unaltered since the Civil War, reflects the religious schooling of enslaved people by George's Episcopal bishop and the parishioners of Zion.

=== Today ===
Talbotton remained a fairly isolated community and the church never had more than 12 families. The Church was placed on the National Register for Historic Places in 1974. It has not had regular Sunday services for over fifty years but is still carefully maintained by the Episcopal Diocese of Atlanta. The Church has never been modernized, refitted or altered, and remains the oldest church building in the Episcopal Diocese of Atlanta.

==== Services ====
Holy Eucharist is offered at Zion Episcopal Church in the afternoon of the Second Sunday of the month.
