= North Market Street Historic District =

Historic district in North Carolina, United States

- U.S. National Register of Historic Places
- U.S. Historic district
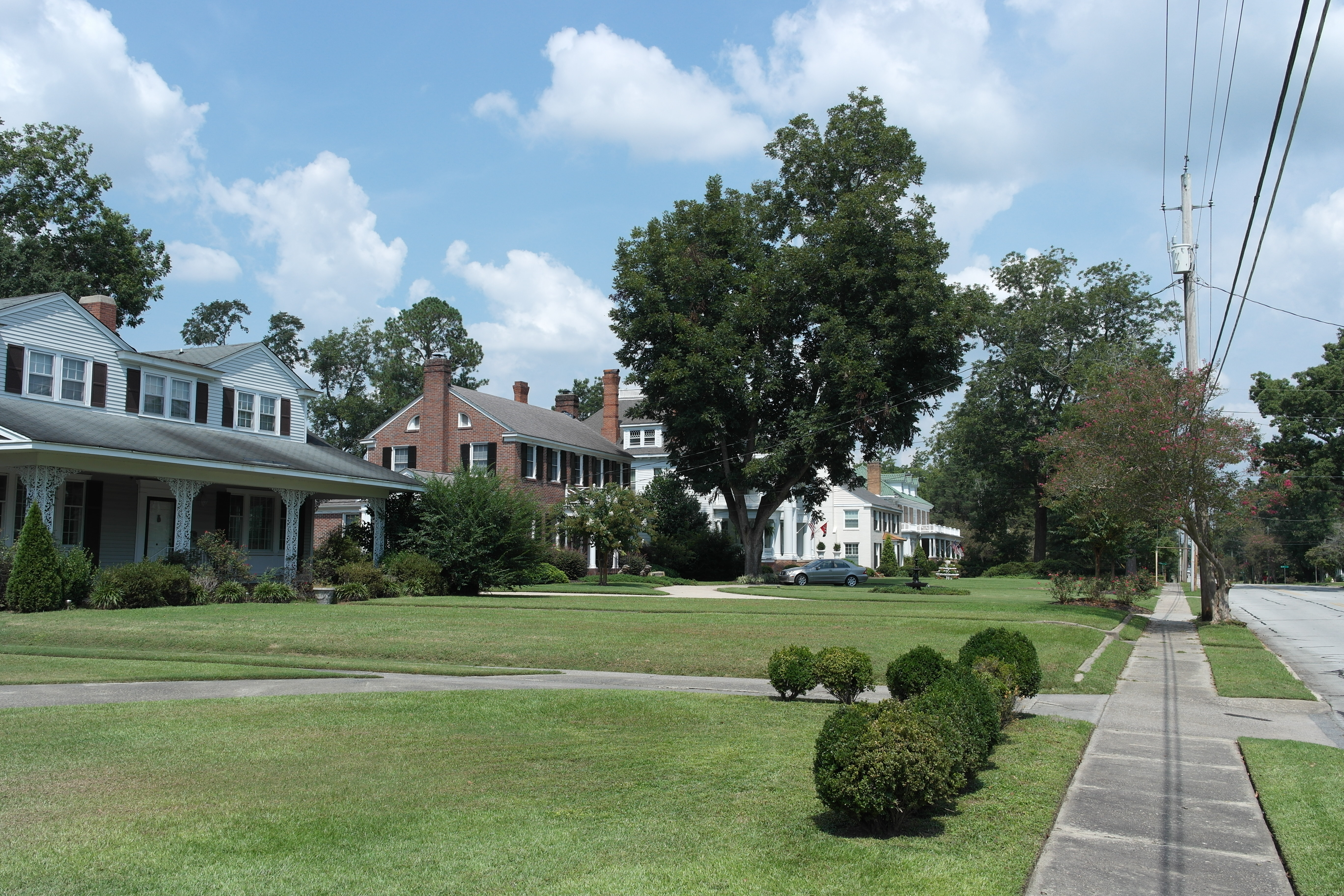
- North Market Street Historic District, September 2013

- Location within North Carolina Location within the United States
- Location: Roughly bounded by 15th, Nicholson & 6th Sts. & Summit Ave., Washington, North Carolina
- Coordinates: 35°33′06″N 77°02′56″W
- Area: 214 acres (87 ha)
- Built: c. 1893
- Architectural style: Victorian, Colonial Revival, Neoclassical, Mission Revival, Craftsman / Bungalow
- NRHP reference No.: 11000767
- Added to NRHP: October 25, 2011

North Market Street Historic District is a national historic district located at Washington, Beaufort County, North Carolina. It encompasses 313 contributing buildings, 1 contributing structure, and 3 contributing objects in a primarily residential section of Washington. Known as Nicholsonville, it was first platted in 1893, and enlarged in 1896 and in 1910. Stylistic influences include Late Victorian, Colonial Revival, Neoclassical, and Mission, and the American Craftsman / Bungalow-styles.

It was listed on the National Register of Historic Places in 2011.
