= Bath School (Bath, North Carolina) =

Historic school building in North Carolina, United States

- U.S. National Register of Historic Places
- U.S. Historic district – Contributing property
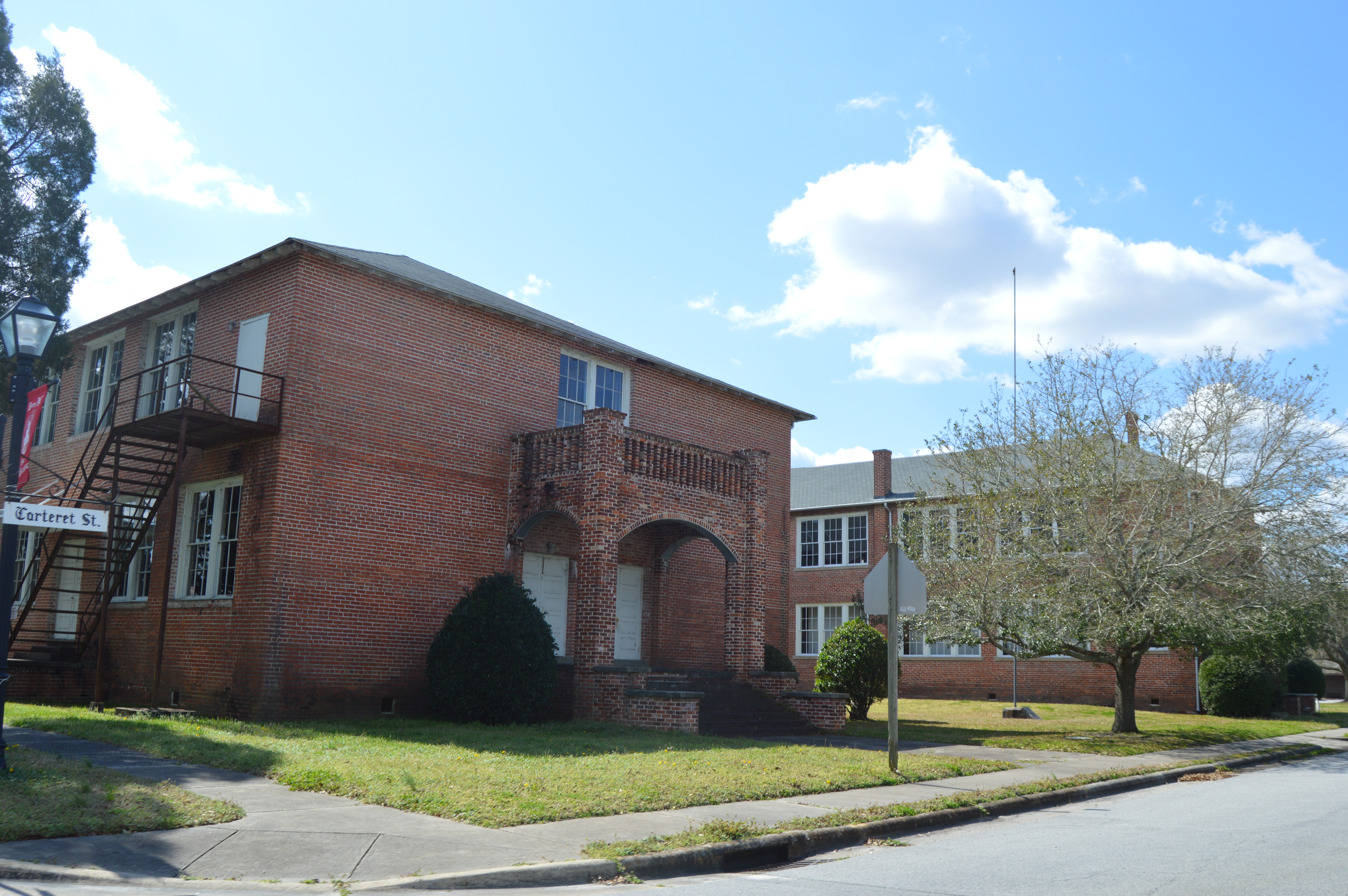
- Carteret Street side

- Location within North Carolina Location within the United States
- Location: King & Carteret Sts., Bath, North Carolina
- Coordinates: 35°28′49″N 76°49′0″W
- Area: 2.6 acres (1.1 ha)
- Built: 1918, 1920, 1921, 1939, 1948
- Architectural style: Colonial Revival
- NRHP reference No.: 07001495
- Added to NRHP: January 30, 2008

Bath School is a historic school complex located at Bath, Beaufort County, North Carolina. It was built in phases between 1918 and 1966, and consists of two classroom buildings and a classroom and auditorium building connected by a two-story hyphen. Each section is a two-story, brick structure with a hipped roof and Colonial Revival style design details. A kitchen addition was built in 1966. Also on the property are the contributing 1 1/2-story vocational building constructed in 1939 with funds from the Public Works Administration (PWA), one-story shop building built in 1948, and flagpole.

It was listed on the National Register of Historic Places in 2008. It is located in the Bath Historic District.
