= Bowers–Tripp House =

Historic house in North Carolina, United States

- U.S. National Register of Historic Places
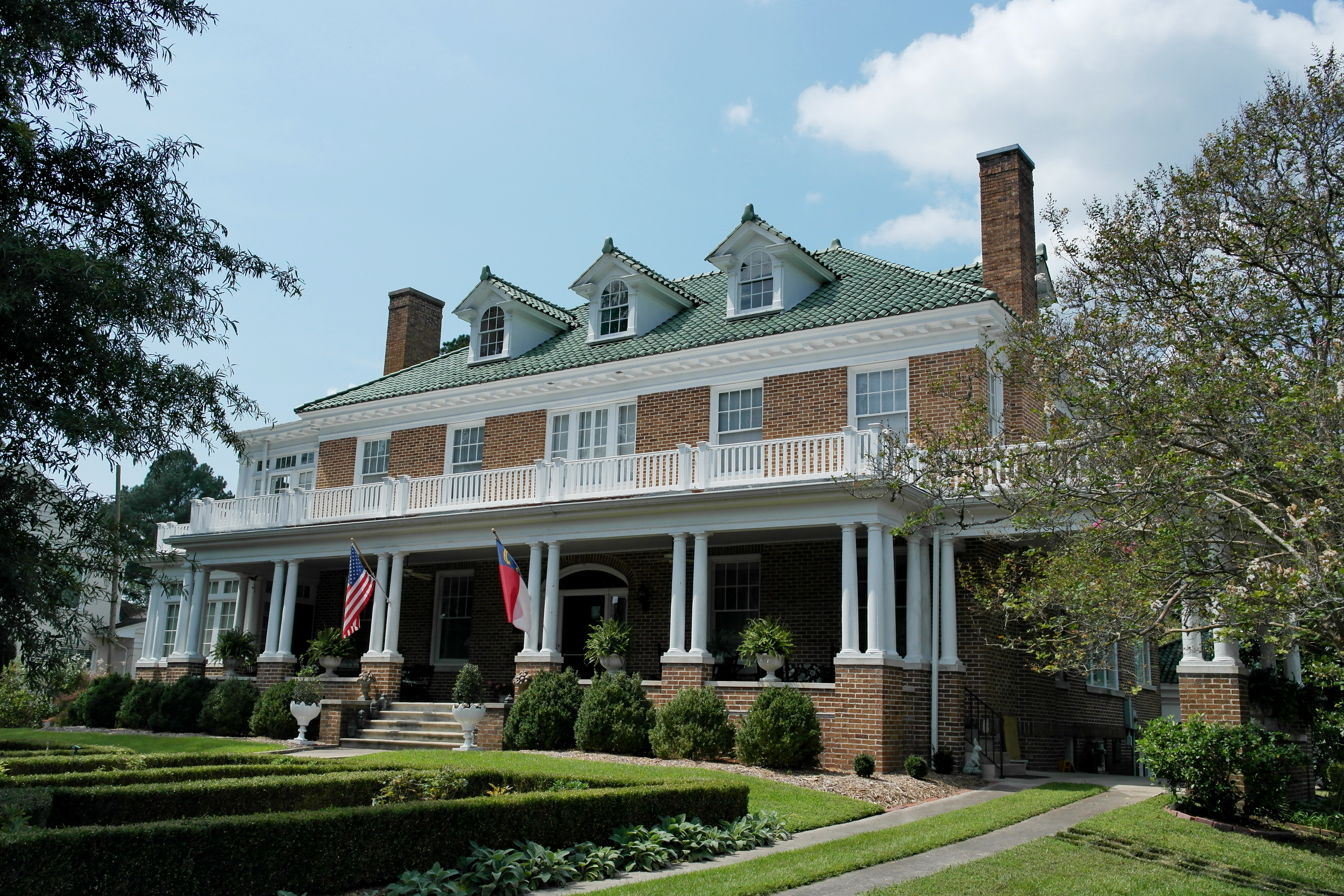

- Location within North Carolina Location within the United States
- Location: 1040 N. Market St., Washington, North Carolina
- Coordinates: 35°33′5″N 77°2′56″W
- Area: less than one acre
- Built: 1921
- Built by: Miller Construction Co.
- Architect: Benton & Benton
- Architectural style: Colonial Revival
- NRHP reference No.: 99000424
- Added to NRHP: April 1, 1999

The Bowers–Tripp House is a historic home located at Washington, Beaufort County, North Carolina. It was designed by Benton & Benton and built in 1921 in the Colonial Revival style. The house and a secondary structure were listed as contributing buildings.

It was listed on the National Register of Historic Places in 1999.

== History ==
When many successful businessmen began to move their families to the outskirts of town, A.L. Bowers hired the prominent architectural firm of Benton and Benton from Wilson, North Carolina, to design a home for him and his family in the new "suburb" of North Market Street, formerly known as Nicholsonville. A. L. Bowers and his brother B. F. Bowers founded Bowers Brothers Department Store, which was located on Main Street.

Bowers, his wife Sally Bette Tayloe Bowers, and their four children moved into the house at 1040 North Market Street in 1921. The Bowers raised their children, along with their nephew, in the house. In 1930, A. L. Bowers died, leaving the house to his four children. His son, Gus Jr., who married a school teacher named Mildred Doxie, resided there until 1945. Mildred Doxie Bowers conducted a Kindergarten class in the basement of the Bowers–Tripp House for a few years.

On April 28, 1945, the Bowers family sold the house to Tom Lewis, a prominent businessman in Washington. Lewis owned the house for only four years. During this time, the house was converted, without structural alteration, into apartments. Several tenants occupied the house during this period.

In 1949 Tom Lewis sold the house to Richard and Leggette Tripp. Richard Tripp was in the U.S. Navy and had served in World War II. The Tripps moved into the house with their three young children. Two more children were born shortly after the family's move into the house.

In 1960 Leggette Tripp died, and in 1962 Richard Tripp married Evelyn Latham. The Tripps lived overseas for ten years in various places, including Cambodia and Bangkok. They maintained ownership of the house during this time, and rented or leased it out while they were away. In 1973 the Tripps returned to Washington.

In 1975 Richard Tripp was elected Mayor of Washington and served a six-year term. During his time as mayor, Richard Tripp initiated the establishment of the National Register Historic District in Washington. Throughout his forty-four-year ownership of the Bowers–Tripp House, Richard Tripp made no structural changes to the house. On October 29, 1993, the Tripps sold the house to Robert and Nita Byrum.

Mr. and Mrs. Byrum owned the home until their death in October 2020. On May 17, 2021, the Byrum Estate sold the house to Ellen Brabo, the current owner. The property opened as The Ell Hotel on June 18, 2022 and currently operates as a bed and breakfast.
