= Pantego Academy =

Historic school building in Pantego, Beaufort County, North Carolina, United States

- U.S. National Register of Historic Places
- Location within North Carolina Location within the United States
- Location: Academy St., Pantego, North Carolina
- Coordinates: 35°35′26″N 76°39′47″W
- Area: less than one acre
- Built: c. 1874, c. 1910
- NRHP reference No.: 84000114
- Added to NRHP: October 25, 1984

Pantego Academy is a historic school building in Pantego, Beaufort County, North Carolina. It was built about 1874 and enlarged and altered to its present appearance about 1910. The main block is a two-story, five-bay frame structure with a hipped roof. It has two two-story, three-bay additions and a seven-bay rear ell. It was originally a private school and later converted for public school use.

It was listed on the National Register of Historic Places in 1984.
