= Rosedale (Washington, North Carolina) =

Historic house in North Carolina, United States

- U.S. National Register of Historic Places
- Location within North Carolina Location within the United States
- Location: NW of Washington off SR 1407, near Washington, North Carolina
- Coordinates: 35°35′48″N 77°4′48″W
- Area: 5 acres (2.0 ha)
- Architectural style: Greek Revival, Italianate
- NRHP reference No.: 82003424
- Added to NRHP: April 29, 1982

Rosedale, also known as Wharton House, is a historic plantation house located near Washington, Beaufort County, North Carolina. It is a large 2 1/2-story, frame dwelling with Greek Revival and Italianate style design elements. It was built as the home of David Bradley Perry, a prominent Beaufort County planter, and later inherited by United States Congressman and Mrs. John Humphrey Small.

It was listed on the National Register of Historic Places in 1982.
