= Bank of Washington, West End Branch =

Historic bank building in North Carolina, US

- U.S. National Register of Historic Places
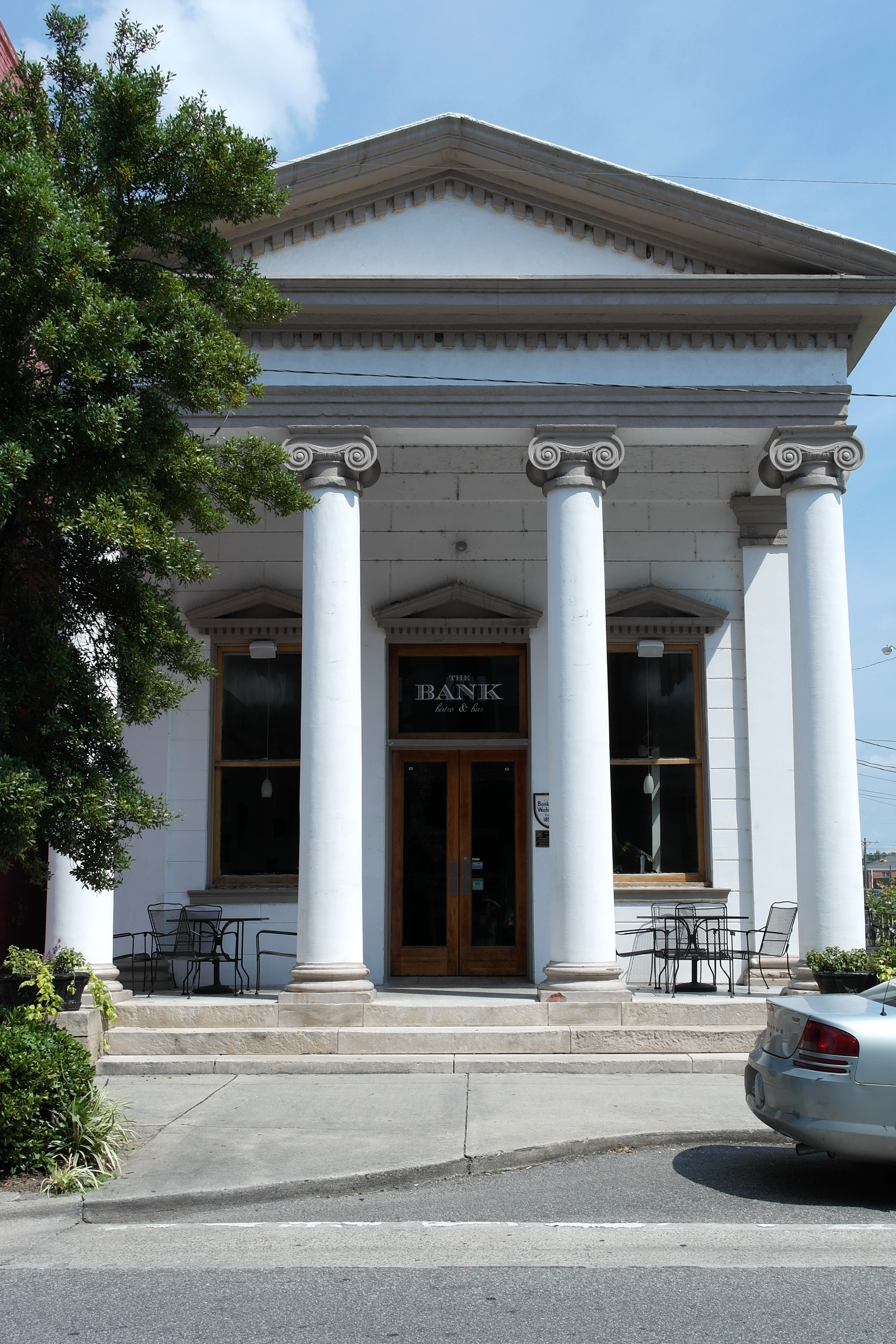
- Bank of Washington, West End Branch, September 2013

- Location within North Carolina Location within the United States
- Location: 216 W. Main St., Washington, North Carolina
- Coordinates: 35°32′36″N 77°3′24″W
- Area: 0.5 acres (0.20 ha)
- Built: 1854
- Architectural style: Greek Revival, Ionic
- NRHP reference No.: 71000566
- Added to NRHP: February 18, 1971

Bank of Washington, West End Branch is a historic bank building located at Washington, Beaufort County, North Carolina. It was built about 1854, and is a two-story, stuccoed brick temple-form building in the Greek Revival style. The front facade features a tetrastyle Ionic order portico.

It was listed on the National Register of Historic Places in 1971.
