= St. Thomas Episcopal Church (Bath, North Carolina) =

- U.S. National Register of Historic Places
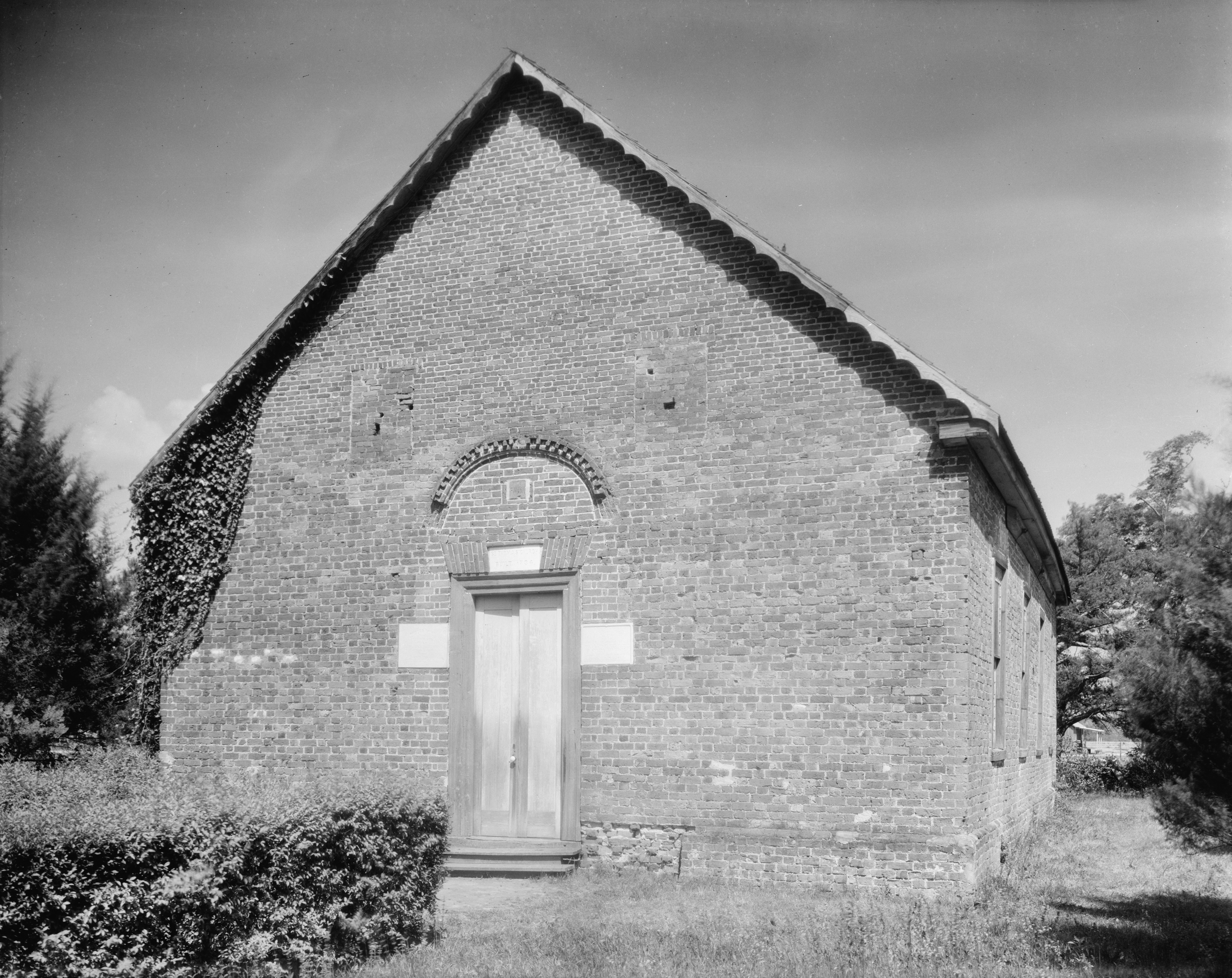

- Location within North Carolina Location within the United States
- Location: Craven St., Bath, North Carolina
- Coordinates: 35°28′26″N 76°48′50″W
- Area: 0.5 acres (0.20 ha)
- Built: 1762
- NRHP reference No.: 70000440
- Added to NRHP: November 20, 1970

St. Thomas Episcopal Church is a historic church on Craven Street in Bath, North Carolina. The church building began construction in 1734 and was completed in 1762, and is the oldest surviving church building in North Carolina. It is a Flemish bond brick structure. The church reported 118 members in 2015 and 126 members in 2023; no membership statistics were reported in 2024 parochial reports. Plate and pledge income reported for the congregation in 2024 was $227,430. Average Sunday attendance (ASA) in 2024 was 63 persons.

== History ==
St. Thomas Parish was established soon after the founding of Bath County, North Carolina, in 1696. Around 1700, the Rev. Thomas Bray, founder of the Society for the Propagation of the Gospel in Foreign Parts in England, mailed books to St Thomas Parish, founding the first public library in the colony. In 1706, on the western bank of Bath Creek, was laid as a glebe for the minister, although there was no minister yet. The parish was formed in 1701 as one of the first churches in the colony. By 1711, the church parishioners were meeting in homes led by lay readers.

The church building began construction in 1734, under the direction of the Rev. John Garzia. The building was completed in 1762 and has been in continuous use ever since.

In 1824, St. Thomas was formally accepted into the Episcopal Diocese of North Carolina and consecrated in 1826. In 1840, a storm destroyed the roof and damaged the interior of the church. As part of the restoration, new fixtures and furniture were installed, reflecting Victorian-era architecture. In 1883, the Episcopal Diocese of East Carolina was formed out of the eastern portion of North Carolina, placing St. Thomas under the jurisdiction of this new diocese.

In 1936, the Bishop of the Episcopal Diocese of East Carolina, the Rt. Rev. Thomas Campbell Darst, The Rev. A.C.D. Noe to St. Thomas, charged with the task of preserving and restoring the church building as a historic treasure. This planned restoration began in 1939 under the guidance of the Rev. Noe and Robert B. Davis. During this time, Noe raised awareness of the historical significance of Bath.

It was added to the National Register of Historic Places in 1970.

== See also ==
- List of the oldest buildings in North Carolina
- List of the oldest churches in the United States
