= Zion Episcopal Church (Washington, North Carolina) =

Historic church in North Carolina, United States

- U.S. National Register of Historic Places
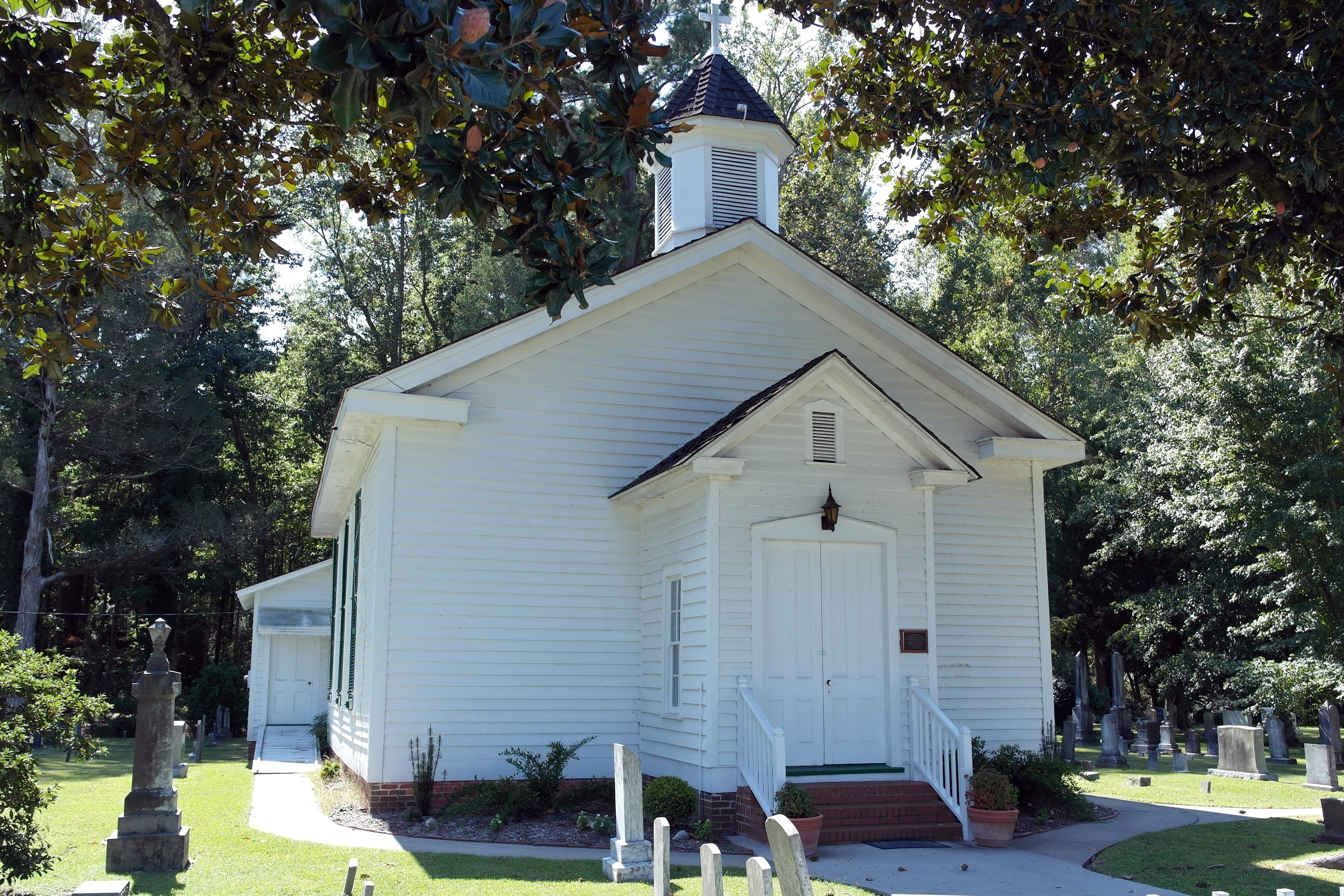

- Location within North Carolina Location within the United States
- Nearest city: US 264, 0.2 miles east of junction with NC 1601, Washington, North Carolina
- Coordinates: 35°31′23″N 76°56′5″W
- Area: 3.3 acres (1.3 ha)
- Built: 1856
- Architectural style: Greek Revival
- NRHP reference No.: 00000988
- Added to NRHP: August 16, 2000

Zion Episcopal Church is a historic Episcopal church complex located near Washington, Beaufort County, North Carolina. It was built in 1856, and is a vernacular Greek Revival style frame building. Also on the property are a contributing church cemetery, rectory (1884-1885), garage, well house, and fence.

It was listed on the National Register of Historic Places in 2000.
