= Beaufort County Courthouse =

Historic courthouse in North Carolina, US

- U.S. National Register of Historic Places
- U.S. Historic district – Contributing property
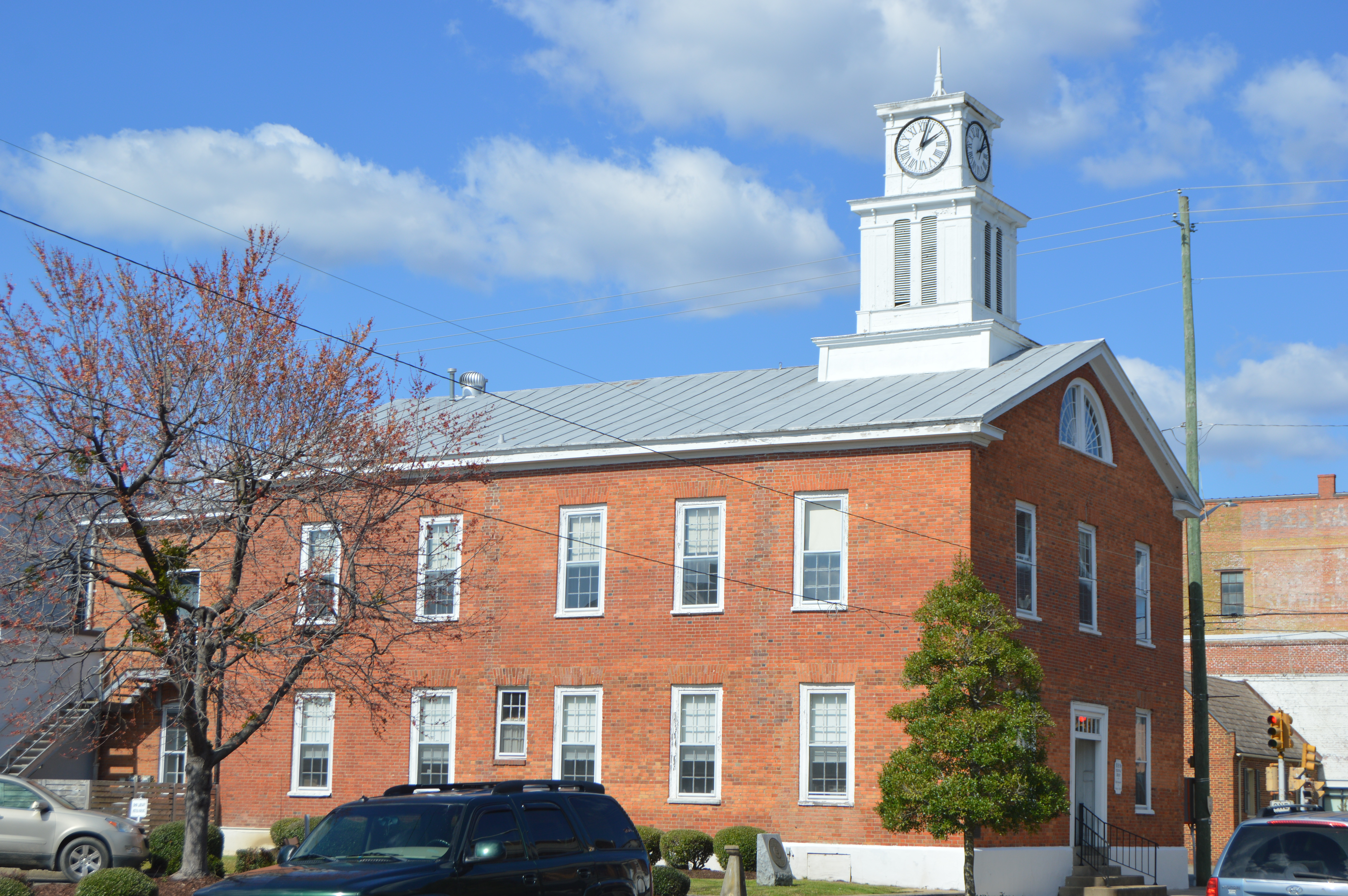
- Southern side and front

- Location within North Carolina Location within the United States
- Location: Corner of W. 2nd and Market Sts., Washington, North Carolina
- Coordinates: 35°32′35″N 77°03′16″W
- Area: 0.5 acres (0.20 ha)
- Built: 1786
- NRHP reference No.: 71000567
- Added to NRHP: March 31, 1971

Beaufort County Courthouse is a historic courthouse building located at Washington, Beaufort County, North Carolina. It was built about 1786, as a two-story, square brick building measuring 42 feet by 42 feet. It was later enlarged with a two-by rear extension and square clock tower. It is one of the earliest public buildings in North Carolina.

It was listed on the National Register of Historic Places in 1971. It is located in the Washington Historic District. It now serves as headquarters for and the Washington Branch of the Beaufort-Hyde-Martin Regional Library.
