= Washington, North Carolina =

- City
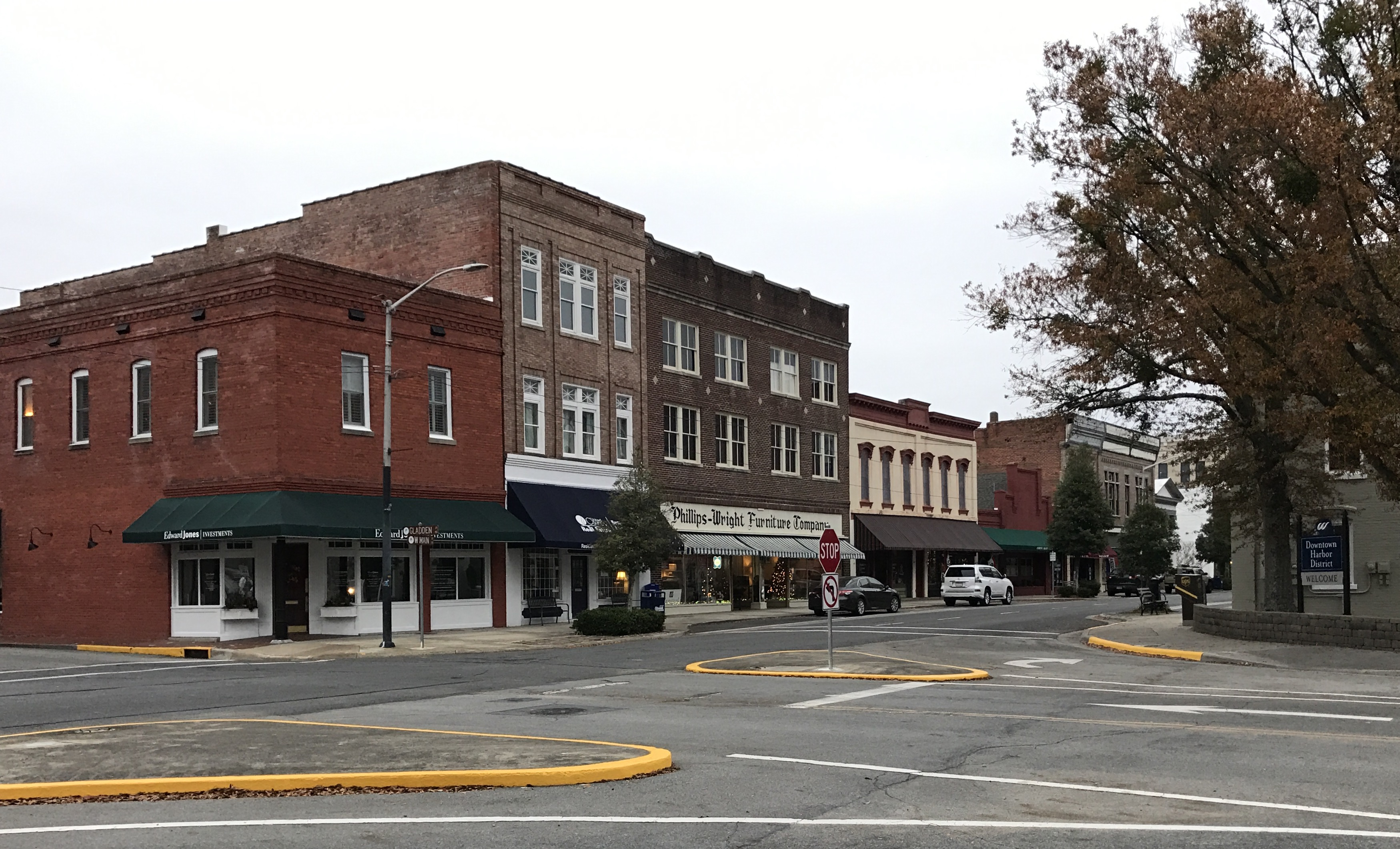
- Washington from the corner of Stewart Street and West Main Street

- Flag Seal Logo
- Nicknames: Little Washington, Original Washington
- Location within the state of North Carolina
- Coordinates: 35°33′13″N 77°03′16″W
- Country: United States
- State: North Carolina
- County: Beaufort
- Established: 1776

Government
  - Type: Council-Manager form of government
  - Mayor: Ellen Brabo

Area
  - Total: 9.02 sq mi (23.37 km^{2})
  - Land: 8.19 sq mi (21.21 km^{2})
  - Water: 0.83 sq mi (2.16 km^{2})
- Elevation: 7 ft (2.1 m)

Population (2020)
  - Total: 9,875
  - Density: 1,205.8/sq mi (465.55/km^{2})
- Time zone: UTC−5 (Eastern (EST))
  - Summer (DST): UTC−4 (EDT)
- ZIP Code: 27889
- Area code: 252
- FIPS code: 37-71220
- GNIS feature ID: 2405682
- Website: www.washingtonnc.gov

Washington is a city in and the county seat of Beaufort County, North Carolina, United States, located on the northern bank of the Pamlico River. The population was 9,875 at the 2020 census. It is commonly known as "Original Washington" or "Little Washington" to distinguish it from Washington, D.C. The closest major city is Greenville, approximately 20 miles (32 km) to the west.

Established in 1776 on land donated by Col. James Bonner, Washington is the first city named after George Washington, the first president of the United States.

== History ==
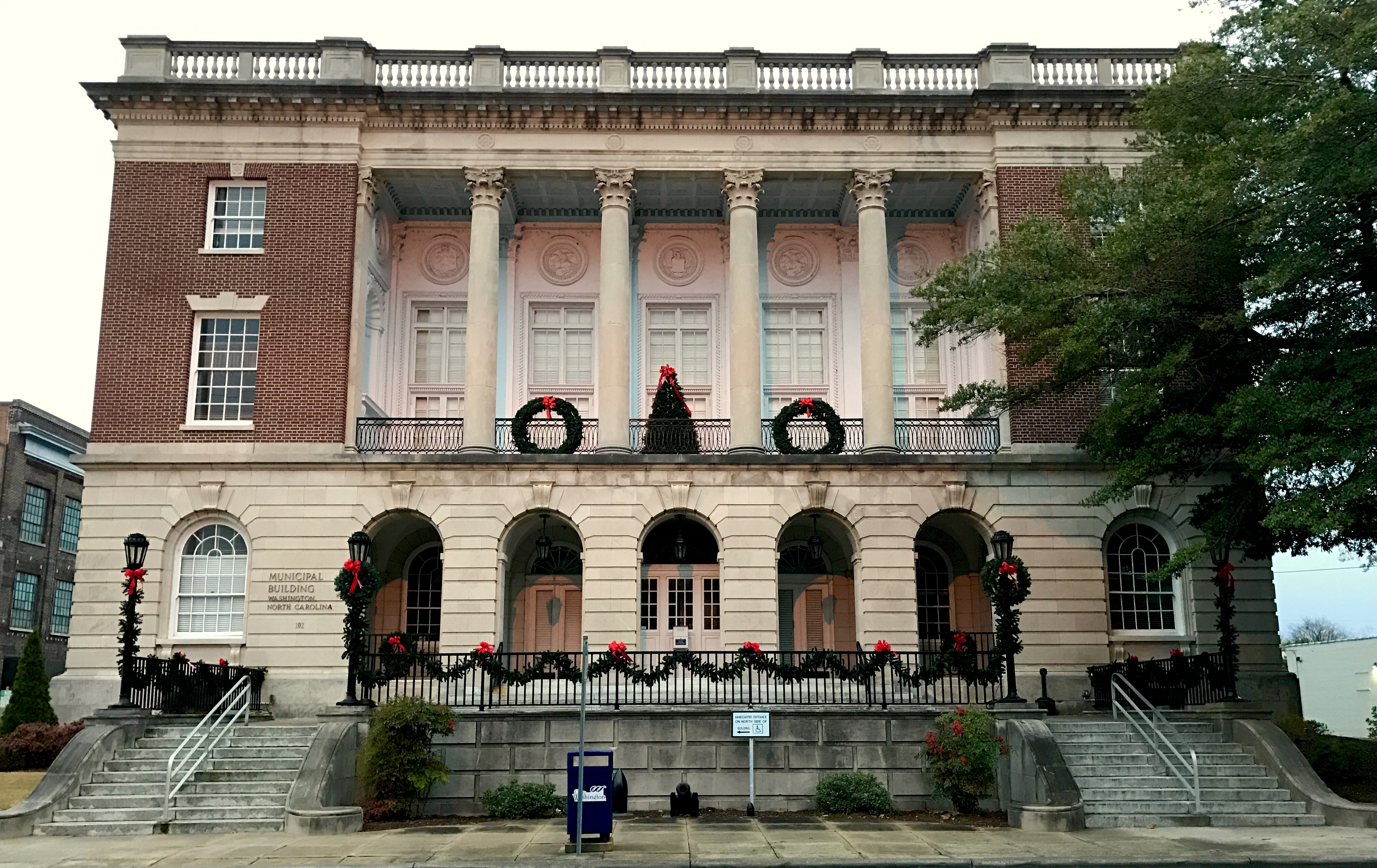
Washington Municipal Building

The settlement at the current location of the city was founded in the 1770s by James Bonner on his land and was known as Forks of the Tar. In 1776, it was renamed Washington. During the American Revolutionary War, Washington served as a supply port when major neighboring ports were under British siege.

== Geography ==
=== Climate ===
Washington has a humid subtropical climate.

Climate data for Washington, North Carolina (1981–2010 normals), (Note: Mean monthly maxima and minima (i.e. the expected highest and lowest temperature readings at any point during the year or given month) calculated based on data at said location from 1981 to 2010.)
Month	Jan	Feb	Mar	Apr	May	Jun	Jul	Aug	Sep	Oct	Nov	Dec	Year
Mean daily maximum °F (°C)	53.8 (12.1)	56.9 (13.8)	63.8 (17.7)	72.8 (22.7)	80.5 (26.9)	87.3 (30.7)	89.7 (32.1)	88.3 (31.3)	83.2 (28.4)	74.1 (23.4)	65.6 (18.7)	56.8 (13.8)	72.7 (22.6)
Mean daily minimum °F (°C)	34.2 (1.2)	36.4 (2.4)	41.9 (5.5)	50.3 (10.2)	59.3 (15.2)	68.5 (20.3)	72.5 (22.5)	70.9 (21.6)	65.4 (18.6)	53.5 (11.9)	44.5 (6.9)	35.7 (2.1)	52.8 (11.6)
Average precipitation inches (mm)	3.85 (98)	3.32 (84)	4.22 (107)	3.14 (80)	4.11 (104)	4.44 (113)	5.45 (138)	5.22 (133)	5.81 (148)	3.28 (83)	3.2 (81)	3.26 (83)	49.3 (1,250)
Average snowfall inches (cm)	0.5 (1.3)	0.4 (1.0)	0.2 (0.51)	0.1 (0.25)	0 (0)	0 (0)	0 (0)	0 (0)	0 (0)	0 (0)	0 (0)	0.8 (2.0)	2 (5.1)
Source: NOAA (Monthly Climate Normals)

== Demographics ==
Historical population
Census	Pop.	Note	%±
1850	2,015		—
1860	1,599		−20.6%
1870	2,094		31.0%
1880	2,462		17.6%
1890	3,545		44.0%
1900	4,842		36.6%
1910	6,211		28.3%
1920	6,314		1.7%
1930	7,035		11.4%
1940	8,569		21.8%
1950	9,698		13.2%
1960	9,939		2.5%
1970	8,961		−9.8%
1980	8,418		−6.1%
1990	9,075		7.8%
2000	9,583		5.6%
2010	9,744		1.7%
2020	9,875		1.3%
U.S. Decennial Census

=== 2020 census ===
As of the 2020 census, Washington had a population of 9,875. The median age was 45.5 years. 21.4% of residents were under the age of 18 and 24.7% of residents were 65 years of age or older. For every 100 females there were 79.5 males, and for every 100 females age 18 and over there were 74.5 males age 18 and over.

99.2% of residents lived in urban areas, while 0.8% lived in rural areas.

There were 4,351 households in Washington, of which 25.7% had children under the age of 18 living in them. Of all households, 32.3% were married-couple households, 18.9% were households with a male householder and no spouse or partner present, and 44.0% were households with a female householder and no spouse or partner present. About 39.1% of all households were made up of individuals and 19.8% had someone living alone who was 65 years of age or older.

There were 5,023 housing units, of which 13.4% were vacant. The homeowner vacancy rate was 2.8% and the rental vacancy rate was 7.3%.

Racial composition as of the 2020 census
Race	Number	Percent
White	4,566	46.2%
Black or African American	4,308	43.6%
American Indian and Alaska Native	40	0.4%
Asian	73	0.7%
Native Hawaiian and Other Pacific Islander	1	0.0%
Some other race	431	4.4%
Two or more races	456	4.6%
Hispanic or Latino (of any race)	714	7.2%

=== 2010 census ===
As of the census of 2010, there were 9,744 people and 4,246 households in the city. The population density was 1,190.0 inhabitants per square mile (459.5/km^{2}). There were 4,754 housing units at an average density of 580.5 per square mile (224.1/km^{2}). The racial composition of the city was: 49.0% White, 45.50% Black or African American, 5.5% Hispanic or Latino American, 0.5% Asian American, 0.2% Native American, 0.1% Native Hawaiian or Other Pacific Islander, and 1.50% two or more races.

There were 4,754 households, out of which 22.5% had children under the age of 18 living with them, 37.3% were married couples living together, 21.1% had a female householder with no husband present, and 37.8% were non-families. 33.5% of all households were made up of individuals, and 15.3% had someone living alone who was 65 years of age or older. The average household size was 2.21 and the average family size was 2.93.

In the city, the age distribution of the population shows 24.7% under the age of 18, 8.6% from 18 to 24, 24.5% from 25 to 44, 22.6% from 45 to 64, and 19.6% who were 65 years of age or older. The median age was 40 years. For every 100 females, there were 77.4 males. For every 100 females age 18 and over, there were 70.8 males.

The median income for a household in the city was $22,057, and the median income for a family was $30,280. Males had a median income of $26,053 versus $21,641 for females. The per capita income for the city was $14,319. About 23.3% of families and 28.7% of the population were below the poverty line, including 42.8% of those under age 18 and 19.3% of those age 65 or over.

== Arts and culture ==
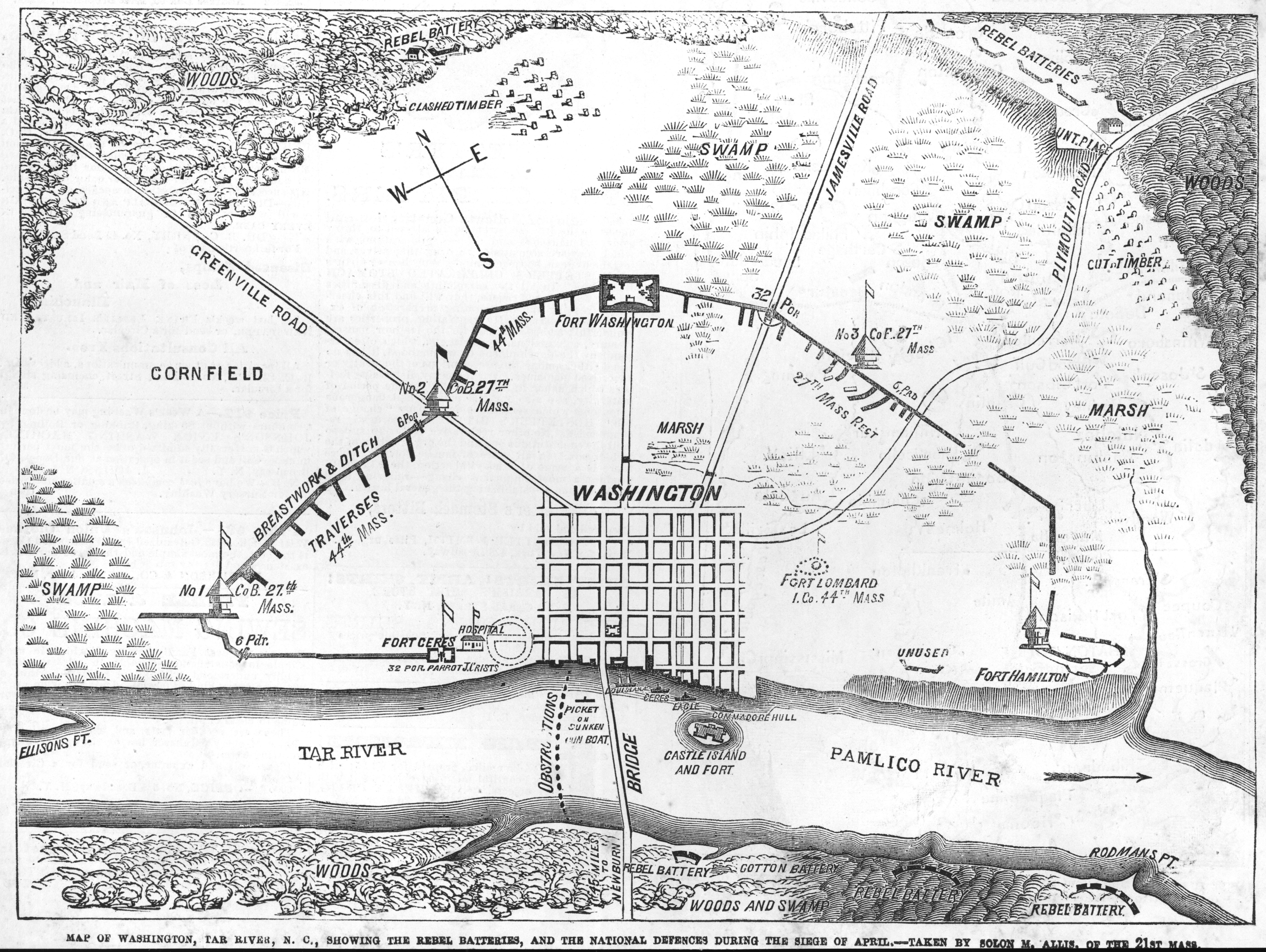
Map of Washington during the American Civil War

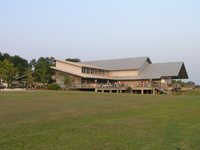
North Carolina Estuarium

Washington has a range of historical buildings and landmarks, with some dating back to colonial and Victorian eras. Historic sites include the Bank of Washington, West End Branch, Beaufort County Courthouse, Bowers–Tripp House, North Market Street Historic District, Rosedale, Washington Historic District, and Zion Episcopal Church are listed on the National Register of Historic Places.

A Farmer's and Artisan's Market is held regularly on the town's green areas on the waterfront.

Bug House Park was home to the Washington Field Museum, which closed at the beginning of World War II.

The North Carolina Estuarium along the Pamlico River holds more than 200 scientific and historic exhibits relating to the ecology of North Carolina's estuaries, the Tar-Pamlico River and Pamlico Sound. The Estuarium also includes a 3/4 mile boardwalk along the Pamlico River.

The Turnage Theatre, a restored building with a historic vaudeville theater and movie theater, reopened in the downtown area in 2014 and hosts plays and other live entertainment. Between 1993 and 2017 a downtown music and art festival called "Music in the Streets" was held every third Friday during summer to attract people to downtown shops and restaurants.

A cannonbalI from the Union attack on Washington during the American Civil War is displayed in an attorney's office on Water Street, and many nearby towns also contain Civil War artifacts and museums. Civil War re-enactors meet in the outskirts of Washington every year.

BHM Regional Library operates the Washington Public Library.

== Education ==
Public education is administered by Beaufort County Schools. Schools located in Washington include:

- Early College High School
- Eastern Elementary School
- J.C. Tayloe Elementary School
- John Small Elementary School

•Washington Montessori Public Charter School

- P.S. Jones Middle School
- Washington High School

== Media ==
=== Print ===
The Washington Daily News was awarded the Pulitzer Prize for Meritorious Public Service in 1990 for a series of stories concerning local water contamination, making it the smallest daily newspaper in history to win the award.

In 2009, the newspaper The Beaufort Observer went from a bi-monthly print publication to an online publication.

=== Television ===
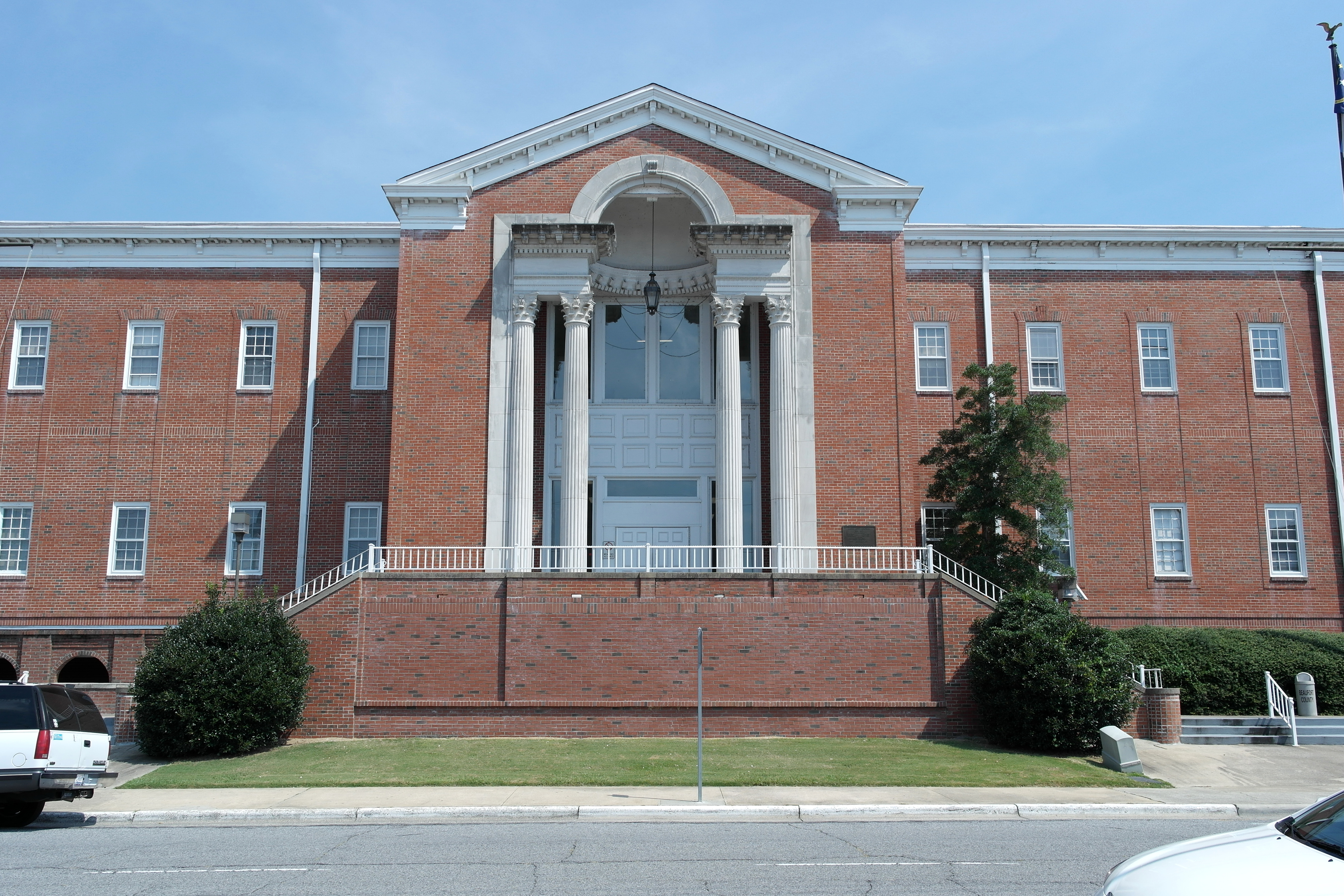
Beaufort County Courthouse

WITN is licensed to Washington.

=== Radio ===
The following radio stations are licensed to Washington:

- 93.3 FM:WERO Bob 93.3
- 97.5 FM:WLGT 97.5 The Bridge
- 1320 AM: WTOW Washington Original Gospel Station

== Notable people ==
- Bam Adebayo, NBA player for the Miami Heat
- Herbert Covington Bonner, Democratic congressman from North Carolina (1940–1965)
- George H. Brown, justice of the North Carolina Supreme Court from 1905 to 1920
- Churchill C. Cambreleng, congressman (1821–1839) and US Minister to Russia
- Terrance Copper, former NFL player
- Josephus Daniels, Secretary of the Navy during World War I, and Ambassador to Mexico under President Franklin Delano Roosevelt's Administration.
- Susan Dimock, pioneer in American medicine and women's health. Studied at the University of Zurich in 1871, and practiced in Boston.
- Tillie Ehringhaus, First Lady of North Carolina
- Murray Hamilton, actor, best remembered for his playing the mayor in Jaws and Mr. Robinson in The Graduate
- Brad Linaweaver, science fiction writer, film producer and screenwriter, magazine publisher.
- Henry Churchill de Mille, playwright and the father of film pioneers Cecil B. DeMille and William C. deMille and the grandfather of the dancer and choreographer Agnes de Mille
- Walter Rasby, former NFL player
- Dominique Wilkins, nine-time NBA All-Star, noted as one of the best dunkers in NBA history, earning the nickname "The Human Highlight Film." In 2006, Wilkins was inducted into the Naismith Memorial Basketball Hall of Fame.
- Willie Williams, Karateka and mixed martial artist
- Ryan Zimmerman, MLB player for the Washington Nationals.
