= Greenville–Washington combined statistical area =

Greenville–Washington, NC Area
- Combined Statistical Area
- Greenville–Washington, NC; Combined Statistical Area
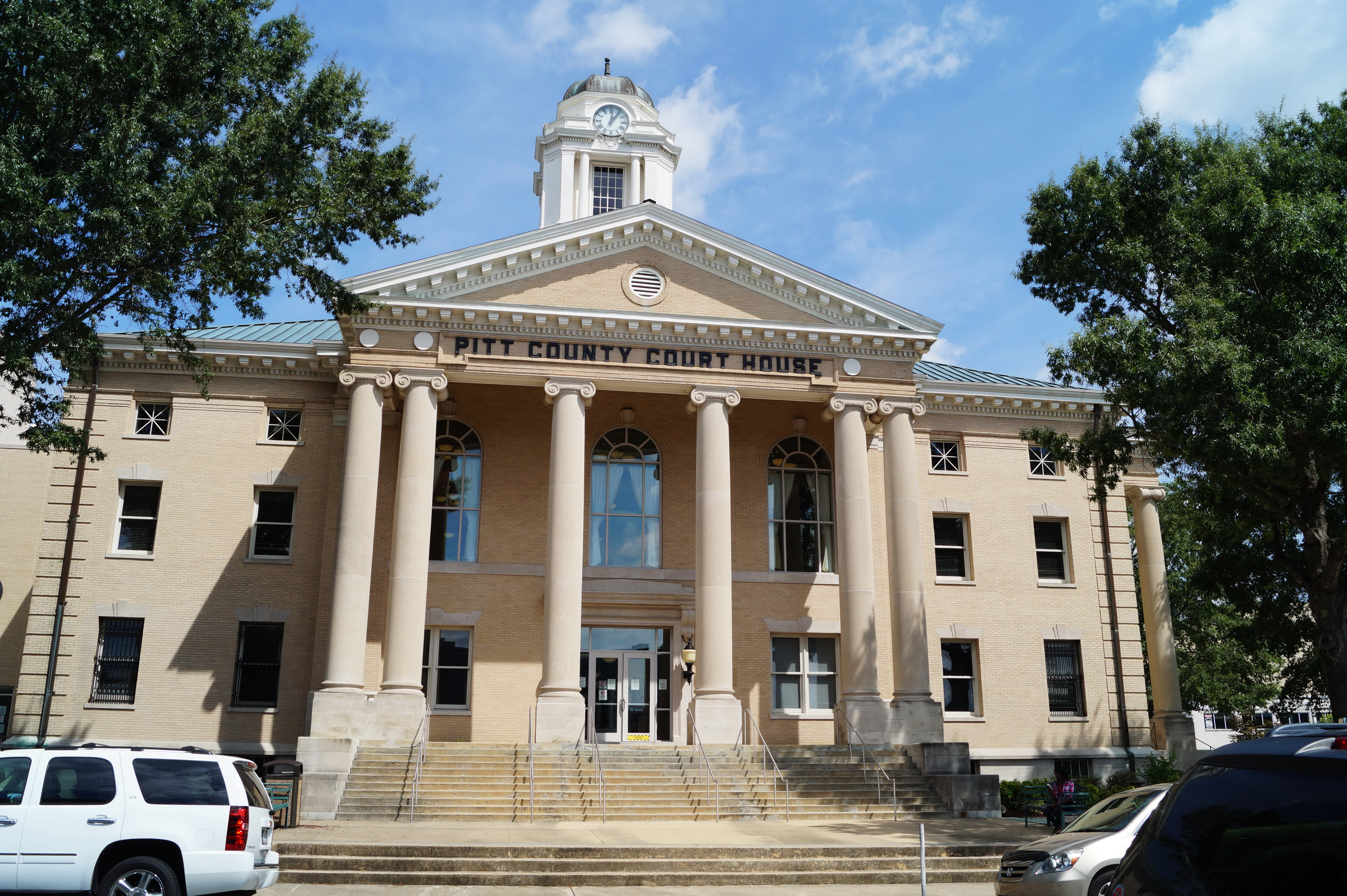
- Pitt County Courthouse in Greenville
- Country: United States
- State: North Carolina
- Largest city: Greenville
- Other cities: Washington; Winterville; Farmville
- Time zone: UTC−5 (EST)
  - Summer (DST): UTC−4 (EDT)

The Greenville–Washington, NC Combined Statistical Area, as defined by the United States Census Bureau, is an area consisting of two counties in Eastern North Carolina. As of the 2011 census estimate, the CSA had a population of 427,723, compared to 399,848 in the 2009 census estimate. It consists of the Greenville, NC Metropolitan Statistical Area and the Washington, NC micropolitan statistical area. Formerly, the CSA included the Kinston, NC micropolitan statistical area which was removed in 2023.

== Counties ==
- Beaufort
- Pitt

== Cities, towns, and communities ==
=== Places with 85,000+ inhabitants ===
- Greenville (anchor city)

=== Places with 5,000 – 85,000 inhabitants ===
- Farmville
- Washington (secondary city)
- Winterville

=== Places with 3,000 – 5,000 inhabitants ===
- Ayden
- River Road

=== Places with 500 – 3,000 inhabitants ===
- Belhaven
- Bethel
- Chocowinity
- Grifton

=== Places with less than 500 inhabitants ===
- Aurora
- Bath
- Falkland
- Fountain
- Grimesland
- Pantego
- Pinetown
- Simpson
- Stokes
- Washington Park

== Demographics ==
As of the census of 2011, there were 427,723 people, 302,604 households, and 294,261 families residing within the CSA. The racial makeup of the MSA was 91.49% White, 5.15% African American, 0.37% Native American, 0.56% Asian, 0.03% Pacific Islander, 1.33% from other races, and 1.06% from two or more races. Hispanic or Latino of any race were 3.15% of the population.

The median income for a household in the MSA was $74,921, and the median income for a family was $61,952. Males had a median income of $60,308 versus $53,069 for females. The per capita income for the MSA was $49,031.

== See also ==
- North Carolina statistical areas
- List of cities, towns, and villages in North Carolina
- List of unincorporated communities in North Carolina
