= Cypress Landing, North Carolina =

- Census-designated place
- Location within North Carolina Location within the United States
- Coordinates: 35°29′50″N 77°3′36″W
- Country: United States
- State: North Carolina
- County: Beaufort

Area
  - Total: 2.69 sq mi (6.97 km^{2})
  - Land: 2.36 sq mi (6.10 km^{2})
  - Water: 0.34 sq mi (0.87 km^{2})
- Elevation: 30 ft (9.1 m)

Population (2020)
  - Total: 1,257
  - Density: 533.7/sq mi (206.05/km^{2})
- Time zone: UTC-5 (Eastern (EST))
  - Summer (DST): UTC-4 (EDT)
- ZIP Code: 27817 (Chocowinity)
- Area code: 252
- FIPS code: 37-16084
- GNIS feature ID: 2812777

Cypress Landing is a planned community and census-designated place (CDP) in Beaufort County, North Carolina, United States. It was first listed as a CDP in the 2020 census with a population of 1,257.

The community is in western Beaufort County, on the south side of Chocowinity Bay, an arm of the tidal Pamlico River. It is 2.5 miles (4.0 km) southeast of the town of Chocowinity via Old Blounts Creek Road. It is 6 miles (10 km) by road south of Washington, the county seat.

== Demographics ==
Historical population
Census	Pop.	Note	%±
2020	1,257		—
U.S. Decennial Census; 2020

=== 2020 census ===
Cypress Landing CDP, North Carolina – Demographic Profile (NH = Non-Hispanic)
Race / Ethnicity	Pop 2020	% 2020
White alone (NH)	1,182	94.03%
Black or African American alone (NH)	28	2.23%
Native American or Alaska Native alone (NH)	4	0.32%
Asian alone (NH)	13	1.03%
Pacific Islander alone (NH)	0	0.00%
Some Other Race alone (NH)	4	0.32%
Mixed Race/Multi-Racial (NH)	17	1.35%
Hispanic or Latino (any race)	9	0.72%
Total	1,257	100.00%

Note: the US Census treats Hispanic/Latino as an ethnic category. This table excludes Latinos from the racial categories and assigns them to a separate category. Hispanics/Latinos can be of any race.
