= Eberstein =

Eberstein may refer to:

- Eberstein, Austria, a town in Carinthia in Austria
- County of Eberstein, a noble family in south-west Germany, centred on Alt Eberstein castle
- Alt Eberstein castle, former home to the above

== People with the surname Eberstein ==
- Ernst Albrecht von Eberstein, German military officer
- Baron Karl von Eberstein, German government official
- Baron William Henry von Eberstein, German-American military officer
