= Southside High School (North Carolina) =

High school in North Carolina, United States

Location
- 5700 NC Highway 33 E Chocowinity, North Carolina 27817; United States
- 35°26′45″N 77°03′24″W

Information
- Funding type: Public school
- Opened: 2001 (25 years ago)
- Status: Open
- School district: Beaufort County Schools
- CEEB code: 340743
- Principal: Justin Holt
- Grades: 9–12
- Enrollment: 500
- Colors: Teal, navy blue, gold and white
- Athletics conference: Coastal Plains 1A/2A
- Team name: Seahawks
- Communities served: Chocowinity, Aurora, Blounts Creek, Edward
- Feeder schools: Chocowinity Primary School, Chocowinity Middle School, S.W. Snowden Elementary School
- Website: shs.beaufort.k12.nc.us

Southside High School (aka Southside) is located at 5700 NC Highway 33 E, in Chocowinity, a small town in Beaufort County, North Carolina, with a ZIP code of 27817. It is in Beaufort County Schools.

Southside is a 1A school.

The attendance zone includes Chocowinity, Aurora, Blounts Creek, and Edward.

It was founded in 2000, when Chocowinity High School and Aurora High School were consolidated into one school. Chocowinity Middle School and Aurora Middle school serve as feeder schools to Southside.

There are approximately 500 students attending Southside, which houses grades 9–12 on a 4 block schedule.

The school's floorplan consists of 4 main halls, 2 of which pertain to certain areas of study. There is a Math/Science/History hall, an English/Technology hall, and a small area dedicated to Performing Arts (Band), one art class, and a Health classroom.

Southside also has a multi-purpose gym, which houses the basketball and volleyball programs; a stadium, which houses its football, soccer, and track and field programs; and separate baseball and softball fields. A double tennis court is also located on campus, though there is no official tennis program as of now, though there may be one in the 2024 school year as interest is building.

The school mascot is the Seahawk. The school's primary spirit color is teal, along with secondary colors including navy blue, gold and white.

== Athletics Programs ==
- Cheerleading
- Girls' Basketball
- Golf
- JV Baseball
- JV Basketball
- JV Football
- Soccer
- Softball
- Track
- Tennis
- Varsity Baseball
- Varsity Basketball
- Varsity Football
- Volleyball
