= Ware Creek School =

Historic school building in North Carolina, United States

- U.S. National Register of Historic Places
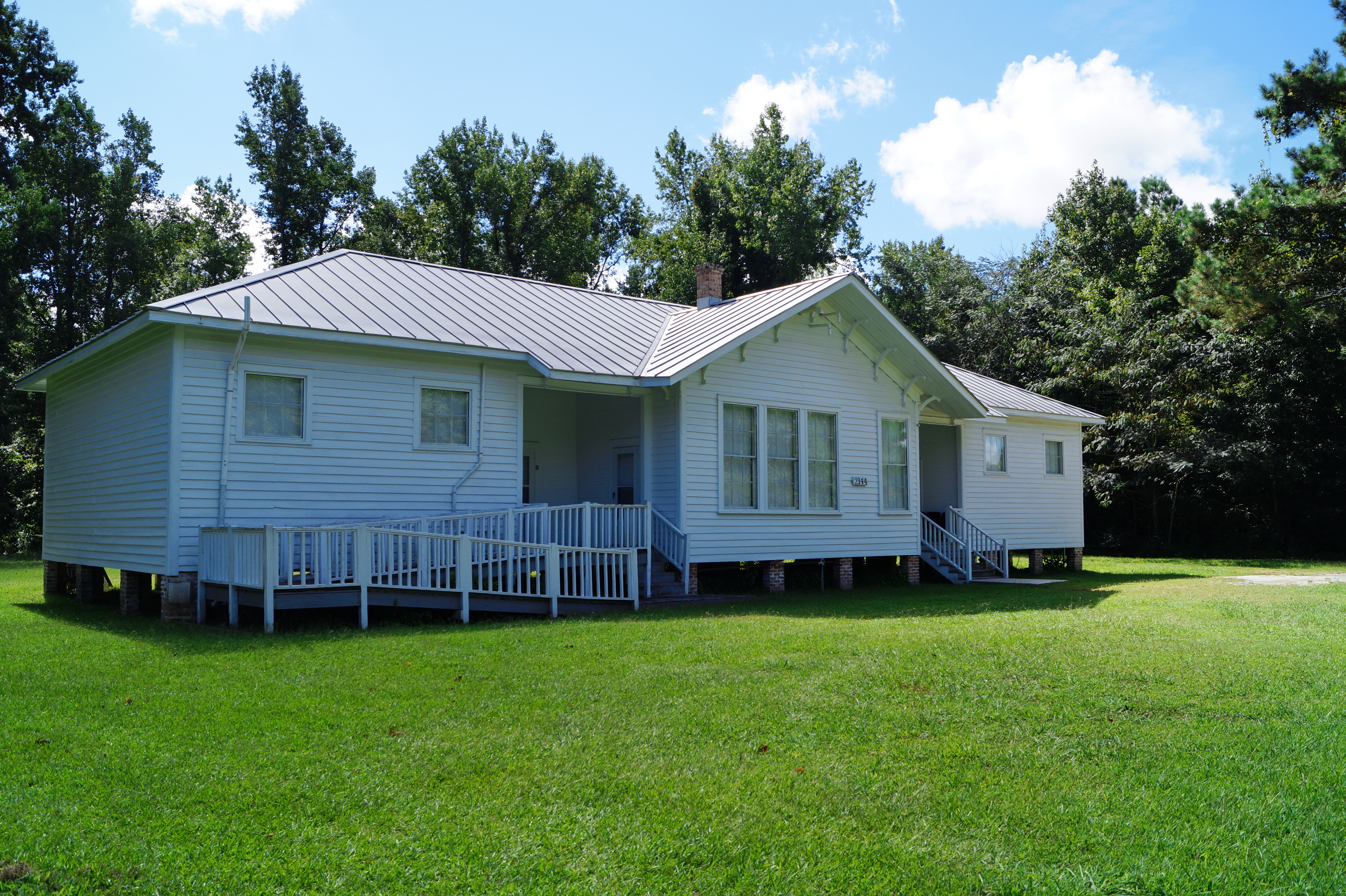

- Location within North Carolina Location within the United States
- Location: East side of NC 1103, .3 miles southeast of junction with NC 1112, Blounts Creek, North Carolina
- Coordinates: 35°25′12″N 76°56′19″W
- Area: less than one acre
- Built: 1921
- Architectural style: Bungalow/craftsman
- NRHP reference No.: 96001443
- Added to NRHP: December 6, 1996

Ware Creek School is a historic Rosenwald school building located at Blounts Creek, Beaufort County, North Carolina. It was built in 1921, and is a one-story rectangular structure with a hipped roof and projecting front pavilions. The main block of the building consists of three classrooms and a projecting central "industrial classroom" under a gable roof. The building exhibits American Craftsman design influences. It ceased use as a school in 1954.

It was listed on the National Register of Historic Places in 1996.
