= Blounts Creek, North Carolina =

Unincorporated community in North Carolina, US

Coordinates: 35°21′00″N 76°57′36″W

Blounts Creek is a small unincorporated rural community in Beaufort County, North Carolina, United States, situated near a creek with the same name. The ZIP Code for Blounts Creek is 27814.

== History ==
Blounts Creek was settled in the 18th century, with many Scottish highlanders settling in the district. The area saw fighting during the Civil War as part of the Washington Front in 1862 and 1863.

The Ware Creek School was listed on the National Register of Historic Places in 1996.

== Education ==
Beaufort County Schools is the local school district. The local schools are S. W. Snowden School (K-8), and Southside High School.
