= Isaiah Respess =

Politician in North Carolina

Isaiah Respess was the mayor of Washington, North Carolina and a state legislator. He represented Beaufort County in the North Carolina Senate in 1866.

He was arrested by Confederate authorities and taken to Richmond. His son, John A. Respess, had joined a Union volunteer regiment.

His office at 102 W. 2nd St. is a historic site. It was originally next to the Beaufort County Courthouse and was moved.

A boat he owned was hit by lightning, killing its passenger.
