= Trinity Episcopal Church (Chocowinity, North Carolina) =

Historic cemetery in North Carolina, United States

Trinity Episcopal Church is an Episcopal parish established in 1774 by the Reverend Nathaniel Blount in Chocowinity, North Carolina, U.S..

== History ==
In 1773, Nathaniel Blount sailed from Bath, NC to London, England to be ordained a priest. The Bishop of London ordained Mr. Blount to the priesthood in Saint Paul's Cathedral, London. Upon his return to Bath, "Parson Blount," as he was known, had a church built. Giles Shute and John Herrington served as carpenters, according to a signed wooden panel in the sanctuary. The little building became known as Blount's Chapel.

In 1826, the Right Rev'd John Stark Ravenscroft consecrated the building as Trinity Church, a parish in the Episcopal Diocese of North Carolina. During the 19th century, the Grimes family were active in this parish. The Grimes held large tracts of land in Beaufort and Pitt Counties.

The nearby town of Grimesland was named for them. Major General Bryan Grimes of the Confederate Army was a member of the parish. The parish's centennial in 1874 was marked by the addition of a formal chancel and sanctuary with stained glass windows. In 1883, Trinity Church became part of the Episcopal Diocese of East Carolina, following the subdivision of the Diocese of North Carolina.

During the first half of the 20th century, the Rev'd N. C. Hughes, Jr, Trinity's rector, was influential in encouraging Chocowinity's citizens to retain the name of their town. There were citizens who desired to change the name. Belview was one of the names considered. Hughes is also credited with learning the meaning of the name of the town from an Indian in South Carolina who offered a translation, "fish from many waters." By keeping this Indian word, the town has retained a unique name for itself.

In 1939, the church building was moved on log rollers drawn by horses from its original location to a plot of land owned by the parish. The parish hall (built ca 1900) already stood on this site, and the church was placed alongside that building. A two-story addition was built in 1949 to provide room for Sunday School, offices, a kitchen, and general purpose space. The historic chapel has remained in continuous use since it was built in 1774. Trinity Church is located at 182 NC Hwy 33 West in Chocowinity.

== Trinity Episcopal Cemetery ==
- Trinity Cemetery
- U.S. National Register of Historic Places
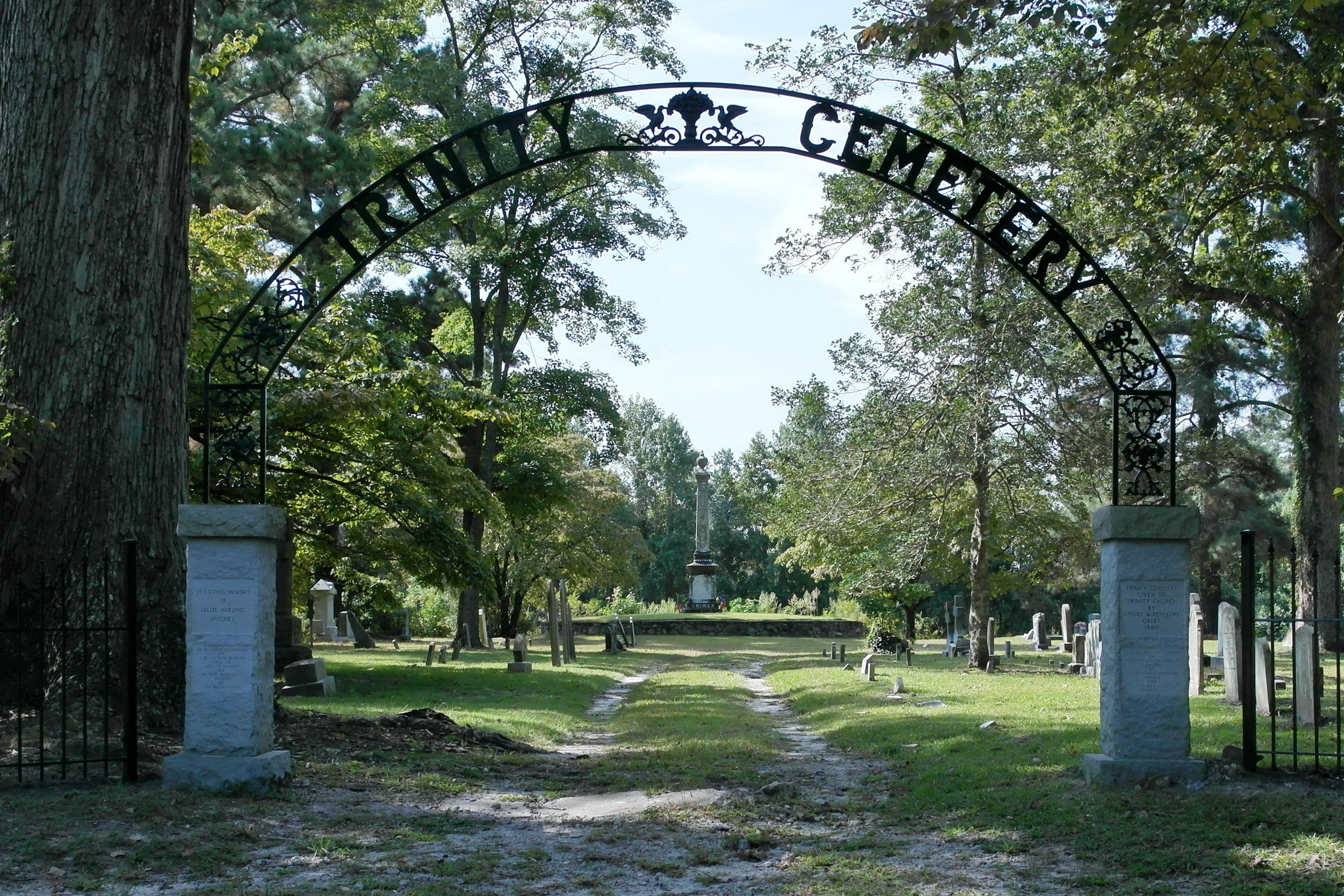
- Trinity Cemetery, September 2013

- Location within North Carolina Location within the United States
- Location: NC 33, .07 miles west of junction with NC 1157, Washington, North Carolina
- Coordinates: 35°30′57″N 77°07′09″W
- Area: approximately one acre
- Built: c. 1860
- Architect: Couper, J. D.; Walsh, C. M.
- Architectural style: Funerary art
- NRHP reference No.: 11000545
- Added to NRHP: August 19, 2011

In the mid-19th century, land was given to the parish to serve as a cemetery. Many notable town leaders and Beaufort County citizens were buried therein, including Revolutionary and Civil War veterans. Penelope and Aspley Grist (sisters) donated further tracts of land to expand the cemetery. The Major General Bryan Grimes cenotaph was erected in the center of the cemetery in his memory and has remained a popular site for Civil War enthusiasts and historians to visit.

The cemetery has continued to serve the parish and community to the present day. In August 2011, the cemetery was added to the National Register of Historic Places.

=== Notable burials ===
- Baron William Henry von Eberstein (1821–1890), German aristocrat and Confederate soldier
- Bryan Grimes (1828–1880), Confederate military officer (memorialized here, not buried)

== List of Priests and Deacons ==
- The Rev'd Nathaniel Blount
- The Rev'd Israel Harding
- The Rev'd Nathaniel Harding
- The Rev'd Nicholas Collin Hughes
- The Rev'd Nicholas Collin Hughes, Jr. (later served as Archdeacon of Raleigh)
- The Rev'd Alexander C. D. Noe
- The Rev'd Charles Malone
- The Rev'd Samuel Black
- The Rev'd James Alves
- The Rev'd Richard Ottaway
- The Rev'd Fred Ferris
- The Rev'd Kenneth Townsend
- The Rev'd Irwin Hulbert
- The Rev'd Jeremiah Day
- The Rev'd Lawrence P. Houston
- The Rev'd William Bomar Etters
- The Rev'd Michael C. Nation
- The Rev'd James Cooke
- The Rev'd J. M. Browne, III

Deacons

- The Rev'd Deacon Susan Moody DuVal
- The Venerable Joy Morgan Dosher
