= River Road, North Carolina =

- Census-designated place
- Location within the state of North Carolina
- Coordinates: 35°30′39″N 76°59′22″W
- Country: United States
- State: North Carolina
- County: Beaufort

Area
  - Total: 7.22 sq mi (18.70 km^{2})
  - Land: 7.09 sq mi (18.36 km^{2})
  - Water: 0.13 sq mi (0.34 km^{2})
- Elevation: 7 ft (2.1 m)

Population (2020)
  - Total: 4,048
  - Density: 571.0/sq mi (220.47/km^{2})
- Time zone: UTC-5 (Eastern (EST))
  - Summer (DST): UTC-4 (EDT)
- ZIP code: 27889
- Area code: 252
- FIPS code: 37-56815
- GNIS feature ID: 2403479

River Road is a census-designated place (CDP) in Beaufort County, North Carolina, United States. The population was 4,048 at the 2020 Census.

== Geography ==
River Road is located on the north bank of the tidal Pamlico River. The town of Washington Park borders the CDP on the west, and the city of Washington, the Beaufort County seat, is 5 miles (8 km) to the west of River Road.

North Carolina Highway 32 (River Road) is the main road through the CDP, leading west into Washington and northeast to U.S. Route 264.

According to the United States Census Bureau, the CDP has a total area of 7.1 square miles (18.4 km^{2}), all land.

== Demographics ==
Historical population
Census	Pop.	Note	%±
2000	4,094		—
2010	4,394		7.3%
2020	4,048		−7.9%
U.S. Decennial Census

=== 2020 census ===
As of the 2020 census, River Road had a population of 4,048. The median age was 45.5 years. 20.8% of residents were under the age of 18 and 23.4% of residents were 65 years of age or older. For every 100 females there were 95.8 males, and for every 100 females age 18 and over there were 93.8 males age 18 and over.

86.8% of residents lived in urban areas, while 13.2% lived in rural areas.

There were 1,727 households in River Road, of which 26.2% had children under the age of 18 living in them. Of all households, 47.0% were married-couple households, 18.9% were households with a male householder and no spouse or partner present, and 28.1% were households with a female householder and no spouse or partner present. About 28.7% of all households were made up of individuals and 14.3% had someone living alone who was 65 years of age or older.

There were 2,026 housing units, of which 14.8% were vacant. The homeowner vacancy rate was 1.4% and the rental vacancy rate was 13.5%.

Racial composition as of the 2020 census
Race	Number	Percent
White	2,561	63.3%
Black or African American	731	18.1%
American Indian and Alaska Native	33	0.8%
Asian	6	0.1%
Native Hawaiian and Other Pacific Islander	2	0.0%
Some other race	553	13.7%
Two or more races	162	4.0%
Hispanic or Latino (of any race)	701	17.3%

=== 2000 census ===
As of the census of 2000, there were 4,094 people, 1,660 households, and 1,183 families residing in the CDP. The population density was 578.5 inhabitants per square mile (223.4/km^{2}). There were 1,946 housing units at an average density of 275.0 per square mile (106.2/km^{2}). The racial makeup of the CDP was 67.98% White, 26.23% African American, 0.29% Native American, 0.22% Asian, 0.15% Pacific Islander, 4.49% from other races, and 0.64% from two or more races. Hispanic or Latino of any race were 9.82% of the population.

There were 1,660 households, out of which 29.4% had children under the age of 18 living with them, 55.9% were married couples living together, 11.5% had a female householder with no husband present, and 28.7% were non-families. 24.1% of all households were made up of individuals, and 8.4% had someone living alone who was 65 years of age or older. The average household size was 2.47 and the average family size was 2.89.

In the CDP, the population was spread out, with 23.2% under the age of 18, 9.6% from 18 to 24, 26.9% from 25 to 44, 25.6% from 45 to 64, and 14.6% who were 65 years of age or older. The median age was 39 years. For every 100 females, there were 98.9 males. For every 100 females age 18 and over, there were 97.4 males.

The median income for a household in the CDP was $39,178, and the median income for a family was $50,385. Males had a median income of $32,364 versus $26,316 for females. The per capita income for the CDP was $19,316. About 17.1% of families and 22.3% of the population were below the poverty line, including 43.6% of those under age 18 and 5.4% of those age 65 or over.
