= Goose Creek State Park =

State park in North Carolina, United States

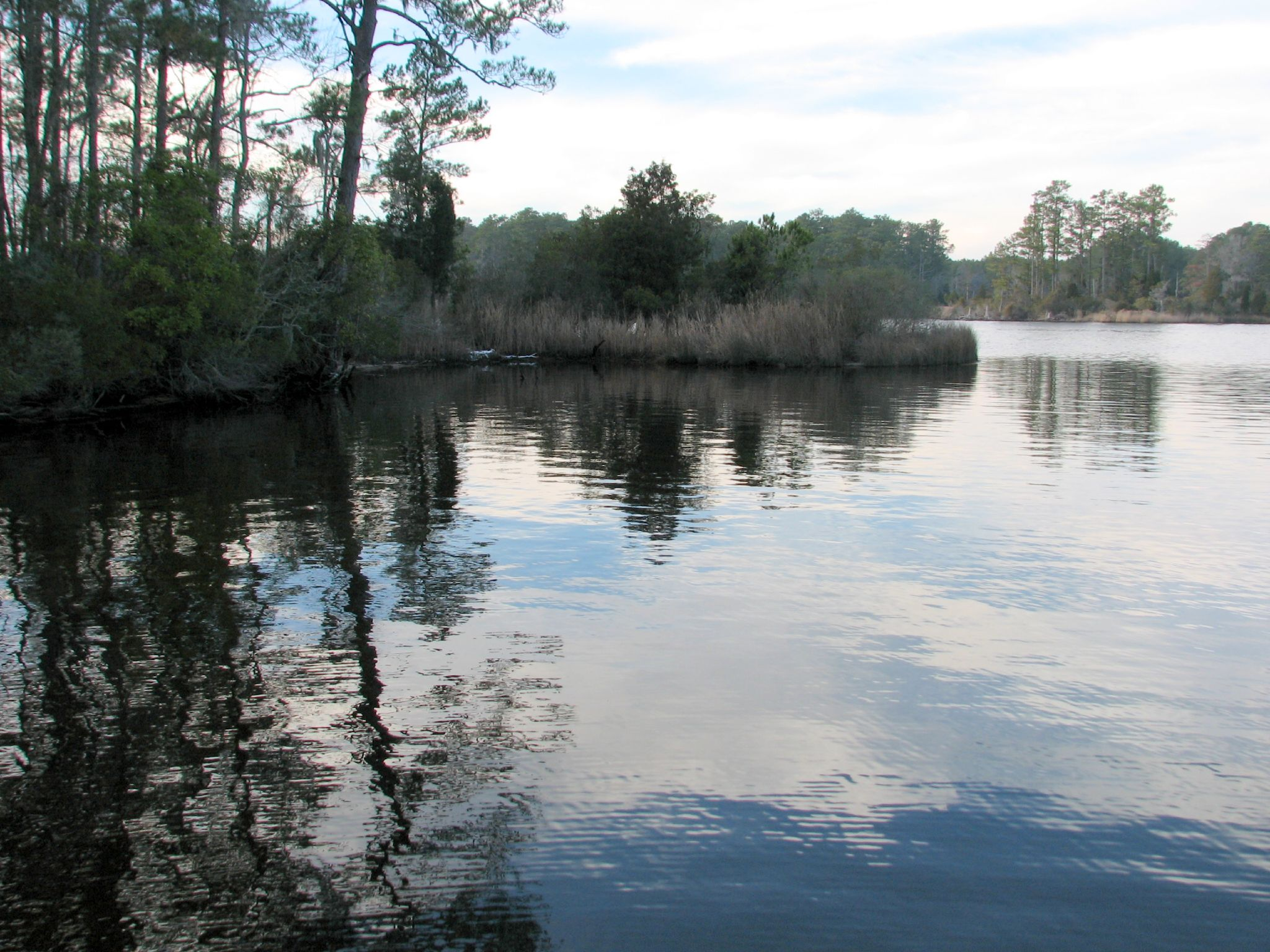

- Location within North Carolina Location within the United States
- Interactive map of Goose Creek State Park
- Location: Beaufort County, North Carolina, United States
- Coordinates: 35°28′55″N 76°54′05″W
- Area: 1,672 acres (677 ha)
- Established: 1974
- Administrator: North Carolina Division of Parks and Recreation
- Website: Official website

U.S. National Natural Landmark
- Designated: 1980

Goose Creek State Park is a North Carolina state park near Washington, Beaufort County, North Carolina in the United States. It covers 1,672 acres (6.77 km^{2}) just off of Pamlico Sound, in North Carolina's Coastal Plain. Goose Creek State Park is home to a wide variety of wildlife that make their homes in the extensive salt water marshes, inlets and creeks on the northern side of the sound. Goose Creek State Park is open for year-round recreation, east of Washington, two miles (3 km) south of U.S. Route 264 on Camp Leach Road.

== History ==
The land in and surrounding Goose Creek State Park has long provided an abundance of natural resources for the people of the area. The first recorded inhabitants of the area were members of the Secota and the Pamlico, two Eastern Woodlands tribes. They were victims of widespread disease brought to colonial North Carolina by settlers from Europe during the 17th century. Most of the Indians that did not succumb to disease were killed or driven off during the Tuscarora War (1711–1715). Goose Creek and Pamlico Sound also provided shelter for pirates such as Blackbeard and Stede Bonnet.

Since the end of the pirate era, the area in and surrounding Goose Creek State Park has been centered on timber production, commercial fishing and small scale, subsistence farming. Lumber companies, such as the Eureka Lumber Company and later Weyerhauser Corporation, acquired extensive tracts of land along the creeks and harvested vasts stands of old growth bald cypress and longleaf pine. Much of the land that is now part of Goose Creek State Park was clear cut. Evidence of the timber industry remains at the park today. Visitors to the park can see the remains of piers and loading docks up and down Goose Creek and an old railroad bed crosses the park.

After the lumber companies had cleared the forests and left the land, citizens of Beaufort County sought to have the land along Goose Creek protected under North Carolina state law. At this time the state was looking for land along the Pamlico River on which to build a park. It was soon determined that Goose Creek would be an ideal setting for a state park. Local citizens showed their support for the effort by sending a resolution to North Carolina governor, James Holshouser. The state purchased 1,208 (4.88 km^{2}) acres of land, at a cost of $1,115,000 from Weyerhauser, for the park and Goose Creek State Park was opened to the public in September 1974.

In 1980, Goose Creek State Park Natural Area was designated as a National Natural Landmark by the National Park Service.

== Recreation ==
Goose Creek State Park is open for year-round recreation offering camping, boating, fishing, hiking, swimming, picnicking, and environmental education.

=== Boating and fishing ===
A boat ramp is on the west shore of Goose Creek at Dinah's Landing. Motorboating, sailing and windsurfing are all permitted at the park. All boaters must follow the rules and regulations of the North Carolina Wildlife Resource Commission. Visitors that are interested in exploring the creeks of the park in canoes must bring their own. Access to the creeks is provided at Dinah's Landing and near the campground. The streams of the park offer opportunities for canoeists to view a wide variety of wading birds that make the park their home.

Fishing is permitted in the waters of Goose Creek State Park. The most popular species of game fish are white and yellow perch, largemouth bass and bluegill.

=== Camping and hiking ===
The campground at Goose Creek State Park is located on a stretch of land between Goose Creek and Flatty Creek. It is a primitive campground with twelve tent sites. The campground is in a grove of longleaf pines that are covered with Spanish moss.

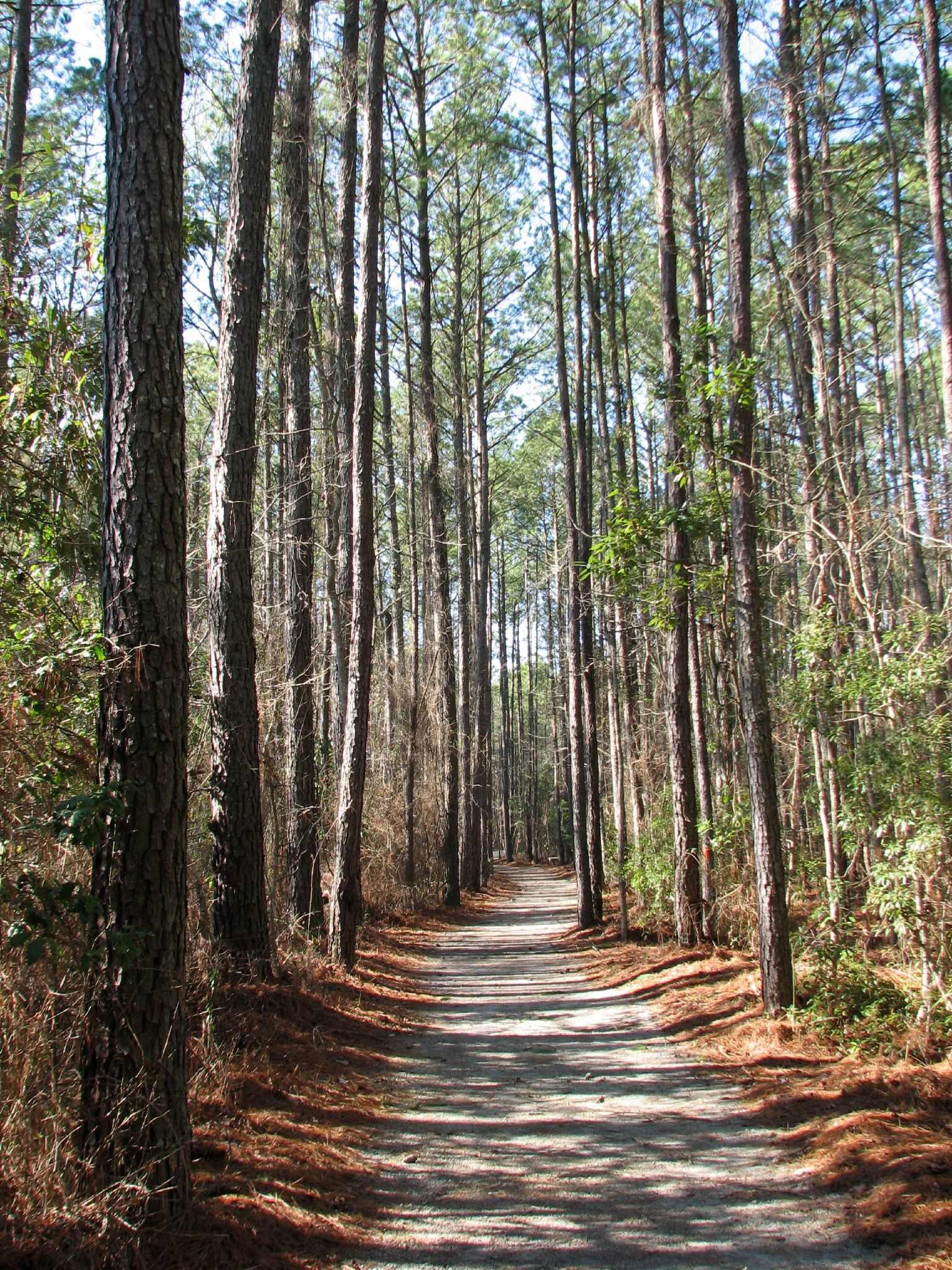

Goose Creek State Park is home to six hiking trails.

Flatty Creek Trail is a one-mile (1.6 km) loop trail that begins and ends at the parking area near the campground. Much of the trail is on boardwalks over the fresh water and brackish water wetlands of the park.

Goose Creek Trail is a 1.9-mile (3.06-km) trail that passes through a cypress swamp.

Ivey Gut Trail runs from the main park road to the campground through two miles (3.22 km) of forest.

Live Oak Trail is a 0.4-mile (0.64-km) trail that passes an old cemetery.

Palmetto Boardwalk Trail is a 0.7-mile (1.13-km) boardwalk trail that connects the Environmental Education Center with the Ivey Gut Parking area, passing through a hardwood swamp.

Mallard Creek Trail is a 1.26 (2.03 km) trail that follows Mallard Creek and an overlook that offers a view of the Pamlico River.

=== Picnicking and swimming ===
There are two pavilions at Goose Creek State Park and several picnic tables in a pine and oak forest near the swimming area. The swimming area is on a sandy beach along the Pamlico River on the southern side of the park.

== Ecology ==
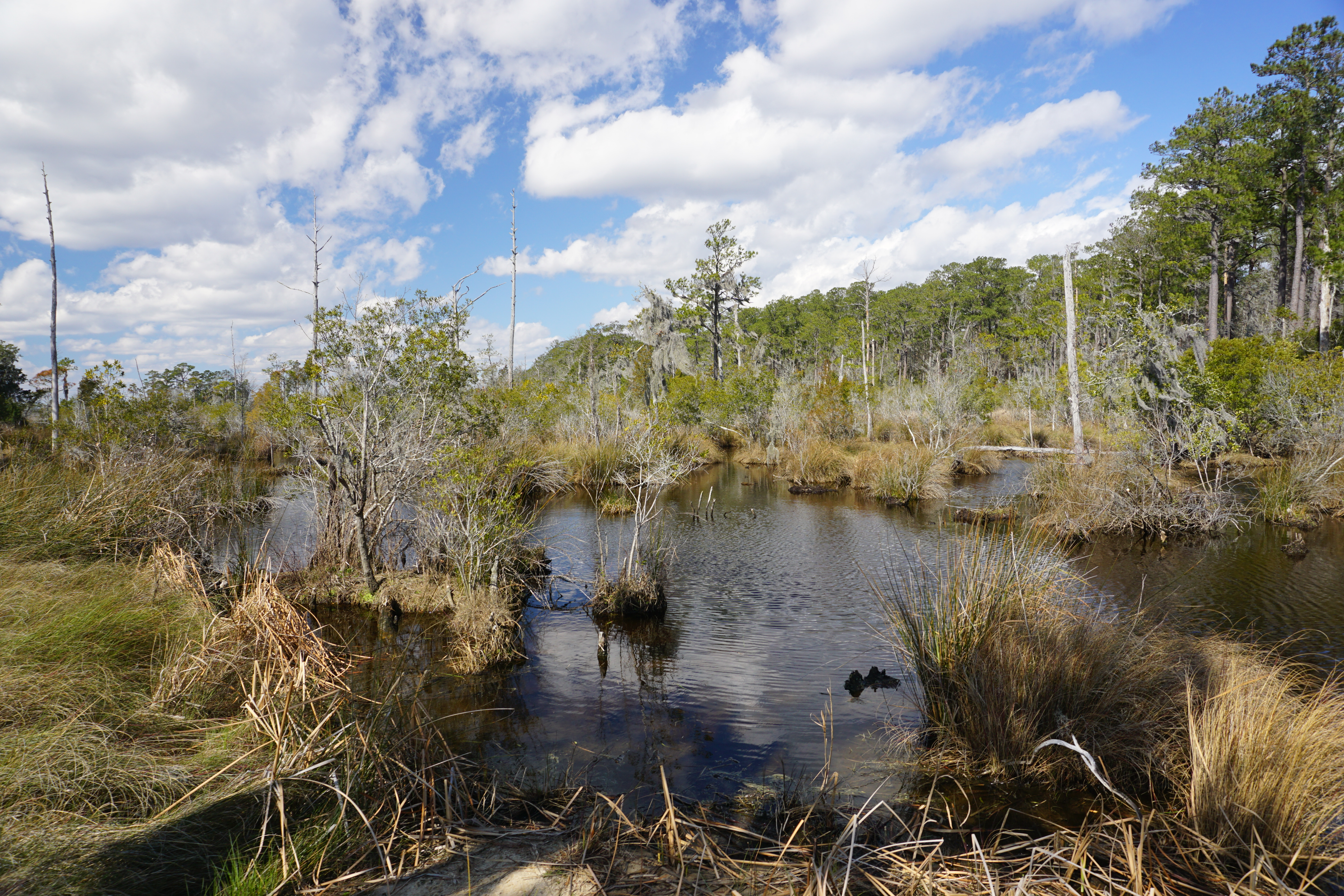
Wetlands in the Goose Creek State Park.

Goose Creek State Park is home to a wide variety of plant and animal species that thrive in the various habitats in place at the park. Sedges, sawgrass and black needle rush can be found in the brackish marshes near the Pamlico River. These tall grasses provide cover and nesting sites for the many wading birds of the park, including, marsh wren, rails, herons and egrets.

The marshes of the park recede in swamps. These swamps are home to bald cypress, loblolly pine and red cedar trees. Many of the trees are covered in Spanish moss. The swamps are home to a wide variety of wildlife including barred owls, frogs, turtles, snakes, minks, turkeys, muskrats and raccoons. Larger animals include white-tailed deer, bobcats, black bear and gray foxes.

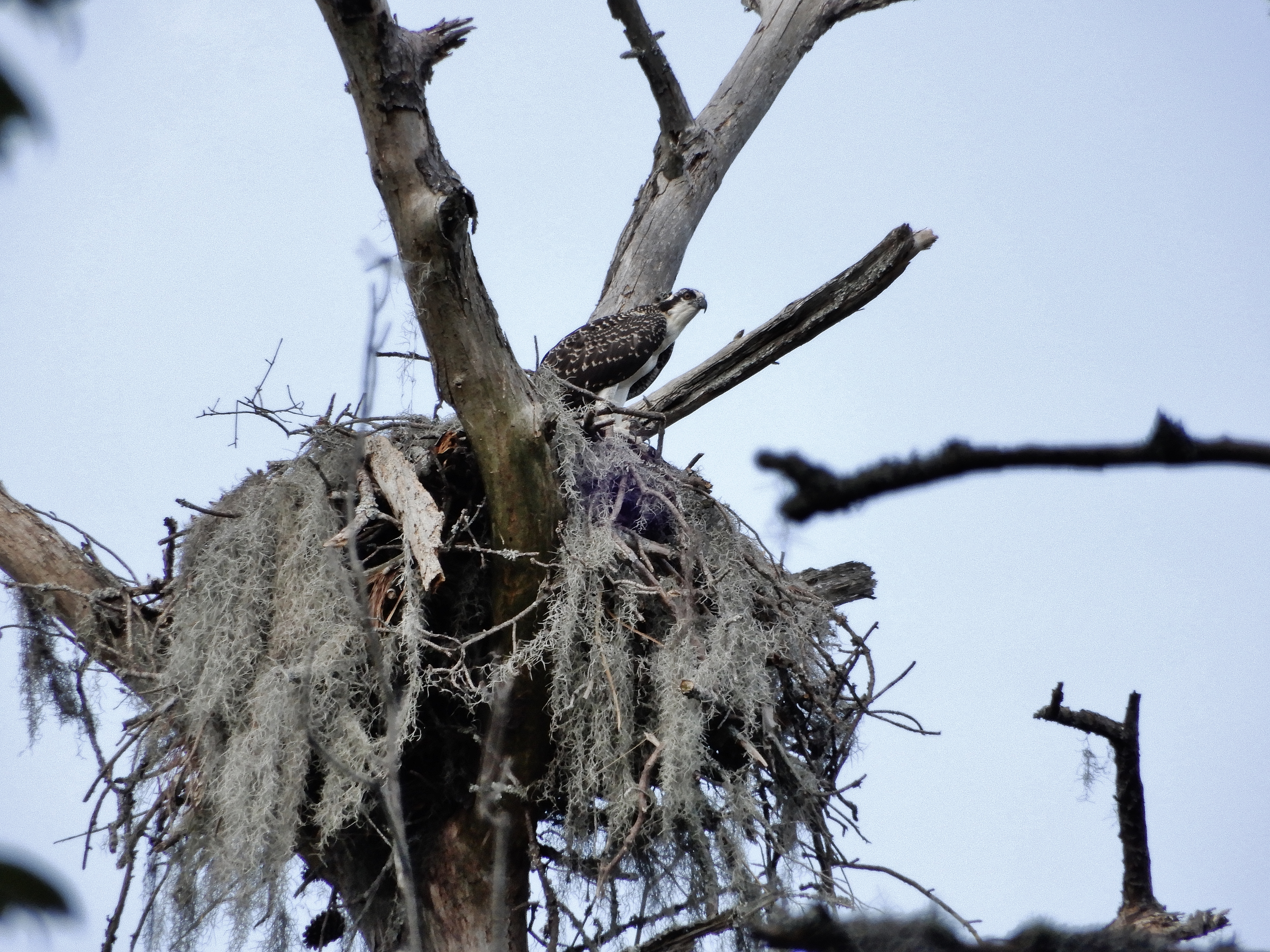
Osprey (Pandion haliaetus) in the Goose Creek State Park.

The waters of Goose Creek and the Pamlico River are visited by a wide variety of migratory birds. Tundra swans and Canada geese winter at the park as do bufflehead, mallard and wood ducks.
