= Chocowinity Bay =

Bay on the Pamlico River in North Carolina, US

Coordinates: 35°30′19″N 77°02′42″W

Chocowinity Bay is located on the Pamlico River in Chocowinity, North Carolina, in the United States. Two of the major activities on Chocowinity Bay are fishing and boating. A wide range of fish can be found all within the bay.
