= William Henry von Eberstein =

German-American mariner, soldier, and farmer

Baron William Henry von Eberstein
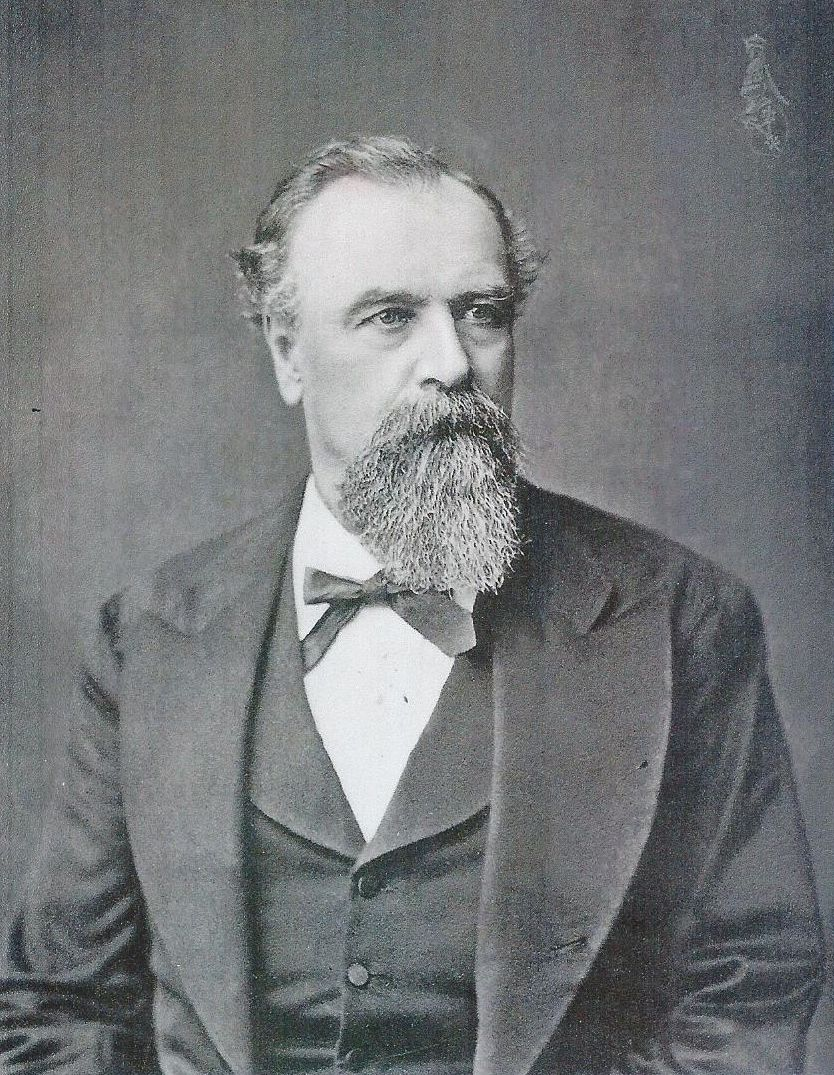

Personal details
- Born: December 15, 1821 Saint-Servan
- Died: October 25, 1890 (aged 68) Chocowinity, North Carolina, U.S.
- Resting place: Trinity Cemetery
- Spouse: Annis Harding
- Children: 4
- Parent(s): Baron Ernst Albrecht von Eberstein; Harriet Perchard Champion
- Occupation: mariner soldier farmer

Military service
- Allegiance: Confederate States
- Branch/service: (Confederate States of America) Confederate States Army
- Years of service: 1861 –
- Rank: Sergeant major
- Battles/wars: American Civil War

Baron William Henry von Eberstein (German: Wilhelm Heinrich Freiherr von Eberstein; 15 December 1821 – 25 October 1890) was a German-American mariner, farmer, and soldier. He served as a sergeant major in the Confederate States Army during the American Civil War.

== Early life and family ==
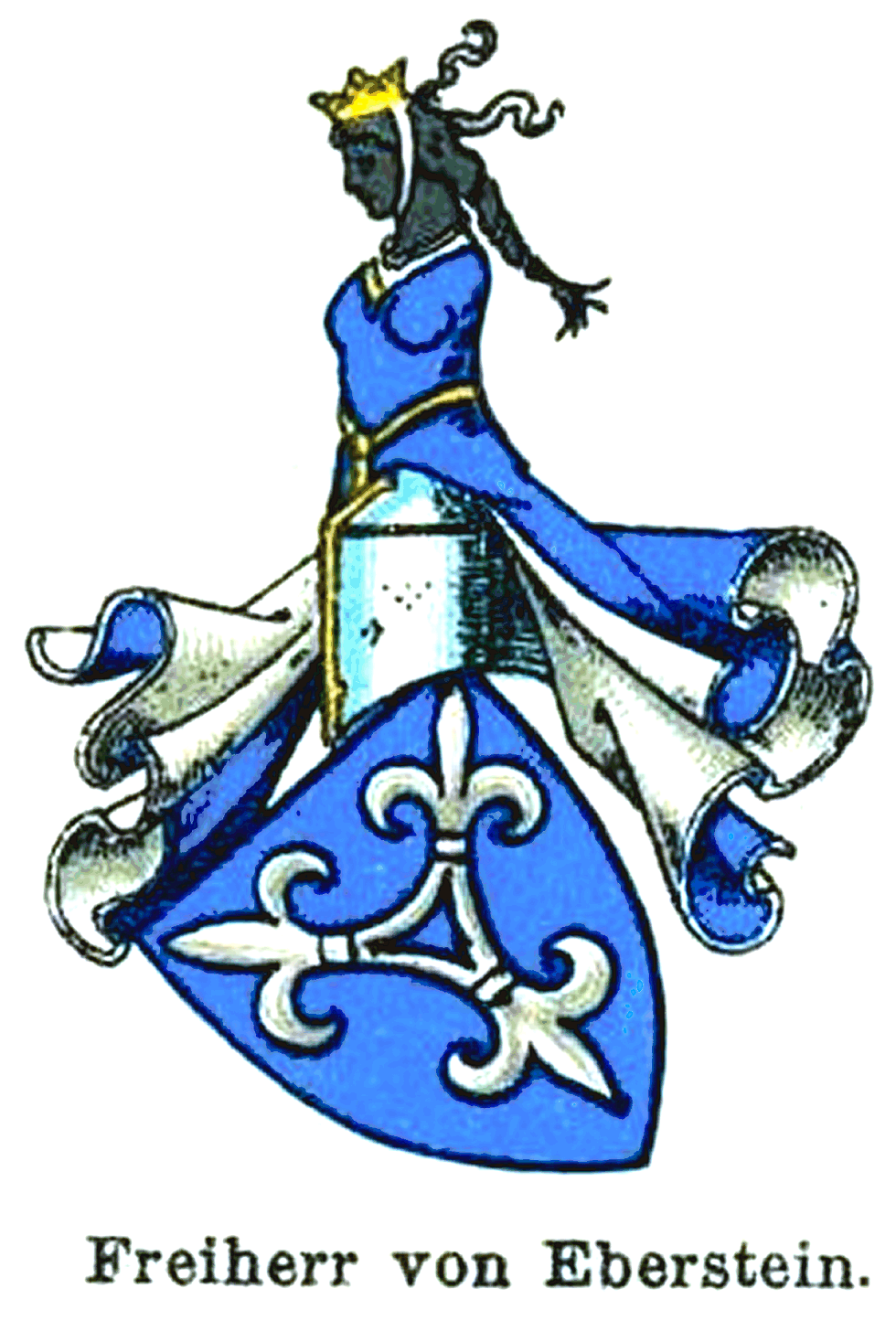
Coat of arms of the Barons of Eberstein.

Von Eberstein was born on 15 December 1821 in Saint-Servan, the fifth of eight children of Baron Ernst Albrecht von Eberstein and Harriet Perchard Champion. He was a member of the Prussian nobility, descending from both German and English aristocracy. His father, Ernst Albrecht, served in the Prussian Army and in the British Army, serving in the 60th Royal American Regiment during the French and Indian War before receiving an appointment as vice consul at Saint-Servan. His mother, Harriet, was a descendent of Eleanor Hyde, the sister of Colonial North Carolinian Governor Edward Hyde.

Von Eberstein lived in France until his father's death, at which time the family relocated to the Isle of Guernsey.

== Mariner ==
Von Eberstein found work as mariner at the age of thirteen. He signed on as a midshipman aboard the merchantman Chief of the British East India Company in 1835. He later signed on the brig William of Guernsey as a second officer and, in 1841, signed on as a first officer of Lallarook. During the 1840s, he also ran enslaved Africans from the Congo to Brazil as captain of the Spanish brig La Bonnie Esperanza. He also served as a third lieutenant of the frigate Imperial Prince in the Brazilian Navy in 1842, as a master of the merchant vessel Carolina in 1843, and as first officer of the American schooner Enterprise.

== Life in America ==
In 1851, he moved to Chocowinity, North Carolina and established himself as a merchant. He married Annis Harding, with whom he later had four children, in April 1852.

On April 15, 1861, at the beginning of the American Civil War, von Eberstein enlisted in Captain Thomas Sparrow 's Washington Grays, Company A, 7th North Carolina Infantry Regiment. He served as the company's fourth sergeant. In 1861, he and other soldiers seized the hospital on Portsmouth Island on the Outer Banks. He was then transferred to a post on Beacon Island, where he was appointed as chief ordnance officer, and then to Swan Point, where he served as a drill master and chief ordnance officer. After Swan Point was evacuated, he administered ordnance and ordnance stores in Tarboro and recruited soldiers for the Confederate Army in Washington. When Washington fell to the Union Army in March 1862, von Eberstein joined the regiment in Greenville. That summer, he went to Wilmington to construct a river battery before transferring to the 61st North Carolina Infantry Regiment on 3 July 1863, where he was promoted to the rank of sergeant-major ordered to Charleston. He received commendation for duty rendered at Battery Wagner and was wounded at Battery Gregg. After recovering at home in Beaufort County, he returned to his regiment in November 1863 and was ordered to Petersburg, where he fought at Blackwater Creek and Drewry's Bluff, and was wounded at the latter.

Due to his injuries, von Eberstein was discharged from the army on 4 October 1864 and returned to Chocowinity. He and his family later moved to Pitt County, where he worked as a farmer and harness maker. By 1891, he was again living in Beaufort County.

He is buried at Trinity Cemetery. His headstone bears the coat of arms of the Eberstein family.
