= Beaufort County Schools (North Carolina) =

School district in North Carolina, United States

Location
- Beaufort County, North Carolina Eastern North Carolina United States

District information
- Type: Public
- Grades: PK–12
- Superintendent: Matthew Cheeseman
- Schools: 14
- Budget: $71,002,000
- NCES District ID: 3700330

Students and staff
- Students: 7,202
- Teachers: 510.70 (on FTE basis)
- Staff: 439.92 (on FTE basis)
- Student–teacher ratio: 14.10:1

Other information
- Website: www.beaufort.k12.nc.us

Beaufort County Schools is a PK–12 graded school district serving Beaufort County, North Carolina. Its 14 schools serve 7,202 students as of the 2010–2011 school year.

== Student demographics ==
For the 2010–2011 school year, Beaufort County Schools had a total population of 7,202 students and 510.70 teachers on a (FTE) basis. This produced a student-teacher ratio of 14.10:1. That same year, out of the student total, the gender ratio was 52% male to 48% female. The demographic group makeup was: White, 51%; Black, 33%; Hispanic, 2%; American Indian, 0%; and Asian/Pacific Islander, 0% (two or more races: 3%). For the same school year, 65.59% of the students received free and reduced-cost lunches.

== Governance ==
The primary governing body of Beaufort County Schools follows a council–manager government format with a nine-member Board of Education appointing a Superintendent to run the day-to-day operations of the system. The school system currently resides in the North Carolina State Board of Education's First District.

=== Board of education ===
The nine members of the Board of Education are elected by districts and generally meet on the third Tuesday of each month. The current members of the board are:

- Eltha S. Booth (District 1)
- E. C. Peed (District 2)
- Barbara Boyd-Williams (District 3)
- Terry Williams (District 4, Chair)
- F. Mac Hodges (District 5)
- Teressa Banks (District 6)
- Robert Belcher (District 7)
- Carolyn Walker (District 8; Vice-Chair)
- Mike Isbell (District 9)

=== Superintendent ===
Don Phipps has been the superintendent of the system since January, 2010. He previously was an administrator with the Cumberland County Schools in Fayetteville, North Carolina.

== Member schools ==
Beaufort County Schools has 14 schools ranging from pre-kindergarten to twelfth grade. Those eight schools are separated into four high schools, two middle schools, seven elementary schools, and one alternative school that covers grades 6–12.

=== High schools ===
- Beaufort County Early College High School (Washington)
- Beaufort County Ed Tech Center – alternative school; grades 6–12 (Washington)
- Northside High School (Pinetown)
- Southside High School (Chocowinity)
- Washington High School (Washington)

=== K-8 schools ===
- Bath Elementary School
- Northeast Elementary School

=== Middle schools ===
- Chocowinity Middle School
- P.S. Jones Middle School

=== Elementary schools ===
- Chocowinity Primary School
- Eastern Elementary School
- John Cotton Tayloe Elementary School
- John Small Elementary School
- Northeast Elementary School

== Athletics ==
According to the North Carolina High School Athletic Association, for the 2011–2012 school year:

- Northside and Southside high schools are 1A schools in the 4 Rivers Conference.
- Washington High is a 3A school in the Coastal Conference.
- The Early College and the Ed Tech Center do not have athletic teams.

== See also ==
- List of school districts in North Carolina
