= Paramé =

Former town and commune in Brittany, France

- Part of Saint-Malo
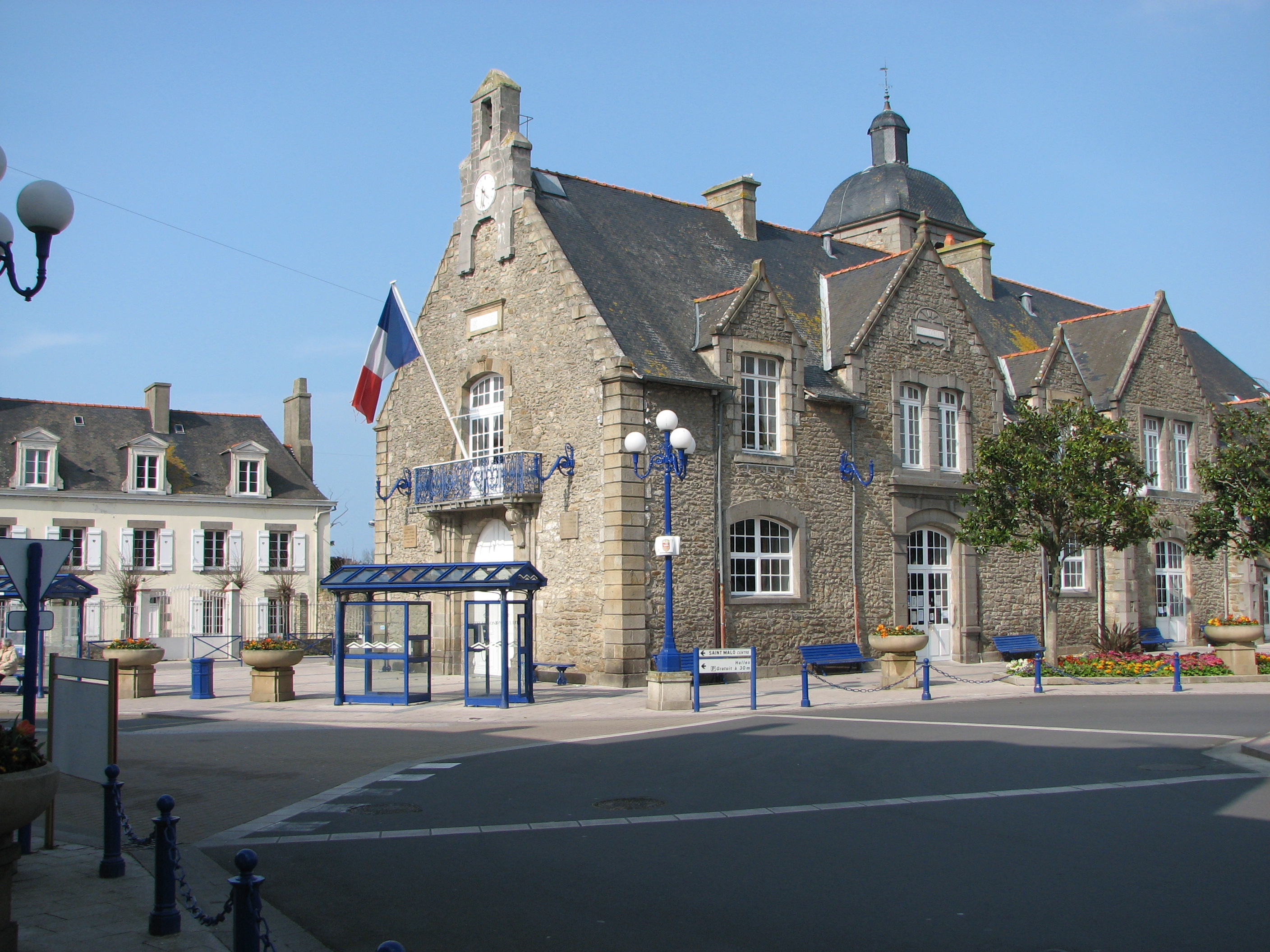
- Town hall
- Location of Paramé
- Location within France Location within Brittany
- Coordinates: 48°39′37″N 1°58′45″W
- Country: France
- Region: Brittany
- Department: Ille-et-Vilaine
- Commune: Saint-Malo
- Population (1962): 8,811
- Time zone: UTC+01:00 (CET)
  - Summer (DST): UTC+02:00 (CEST)

Paramé (French pronunciation: [paʁame]; Breton: Parame) is a former town and commune of France on the north coast of Brittany. In 1967 Paramé was, together with Saint-Servan, merged into Saint-Malo. Paramé is now a district of Saint-Malo and its seaside resort. The town is known for its long sandy beach and its sea spa.
