= Saint-Servan =

French commune

Coordinates: 48°38′10″N 2°0′53″W

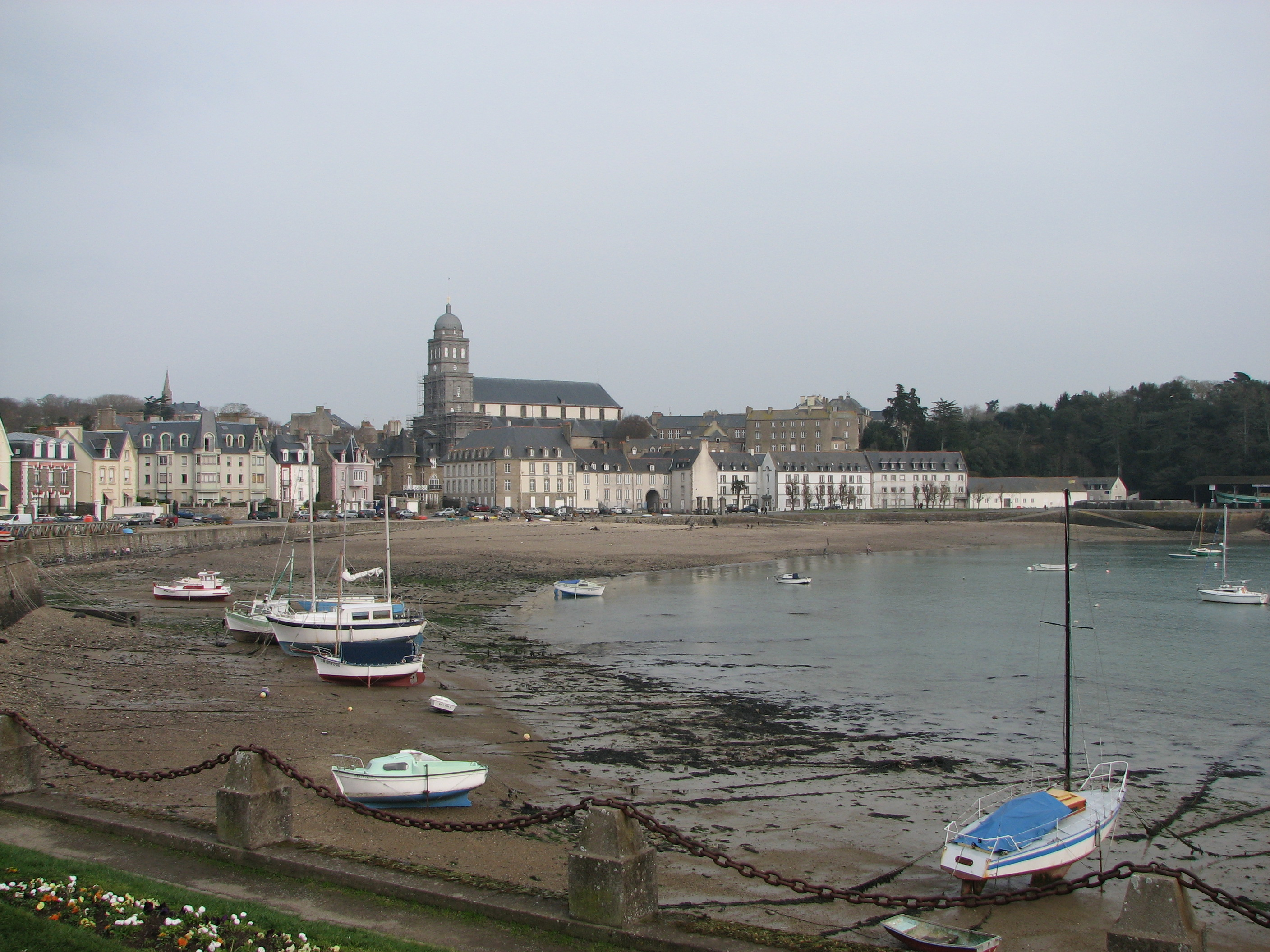
Saint-Servan

Saint-Servan (French pronunciation: [sɛ̃ sɛʁvɑ̃]; often abbreviated as St. Servan; Breton: Sant-Servan) is a town of western France, in Brittany, situated 2 miles from the ferry port of Saint-Malo. It is renowned for its shops and restaurants.

== History ==
In June 1758, during the Seven Years' War, British troops captured Saint-Servan as part of the Raid on St Malo. The British burnt 30 privateers and a hundred other ships before they withdrew.

Its population in 1906 was 1,965. A trolleybus service to Saint Malo was introduced that year by Tracteurs Electrique Bretons. They used an electrobus designed by Louis Lombard-Gérin. It followed the route of the existing tramway. Although the route was extended to Paramé in April 1907, the service was scrapped on 5 June 1907.

The commune of Saint-Servan was merged with Paramé, into the commune of Saint-Malo in 1967. Originally, the area was known as Aleth, whose first bishop was the 5th century Saint Malo.

Today, Catholic pilgrims can visit the House of the Cross at Saint-Servan where Saint Jeanne Jugan performed her charitable works for the Little Sisters of the Poor.

== Notable people ==
- Louis Duchesne (1843–1922), historian and writer.
- William Henry von Eberstein (1821–1890), mariner, soldier, and farmer
- Édouard Riou (1833-1900), illustrator
