= Washington Park, North Carolina =

- Town
- Logo

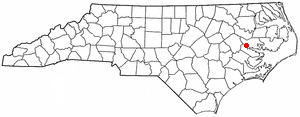
- Location of Washington Park, North Carolina
- Coordinates: 35°31′58″N 77°01′54″W
- Country: United States
- State: North Carolina
- County: Beaufort

Area
  - Total: 0.26 sq mi (0.68 km^{2})
  - Land: 0.26 sq mi (0.68 km^{2})
  - Water: 0 sq mi (0.00 km^{2})
- Elevation: 7 ft (2.1 m)

Population (2020)
  - Total: 392
  - Density: 1,484.3/sq mi (573.11/km^{2})
- Time zone: UTC-5 (Eastern (EST))
  - Summer (DST): UTC-4 (EDT)
- ZIP code: 27889
- Area code: 252
- FIPS code: 37-71240
- GNIS feature ID: 2406836
- Website: townofwashingtonpark.com

Washington Park is a town in Beaufort County, North Carolina, United States. The population was 392 at the 2020 census.

== Geography ==
According to the United States Census Bureau, the town has a total area of 0.3 square miles (0.78 km^{2}), all land.

== Demographics ==
Historical population
| Census | Pop. | Note | %± |
|---|---|---|---|
| 1930 | 193 | | — |
| 1940 | 295 | | 52.8% |
| 1950 | 421 | | 42.7% |
| 1960 | 574 | | 36.3% |
| 1970 | 517 | | −9.9% |
| 1980 | 514 | | −0.6% |
| 1990 | 403 | | −21.6% |
| 2000 | 440 | | 9.2% |
| 2010 | 451 | | 2.5% |
| 2020 | 392 | | −13.1% |
U.S. Decennial Census

As of the census of 2000, there were 440 people, 203 households, and 133 families residing in the town. The population density was 1,664.9 inhabitants per square mile (642.8/km^{2}). There were 218 housing units at an average density of 824.9 per square mile (318.5/km^{2}). The racial makeup of the town was 96.59% White, 1.59% African American, 0.68% Native American, 0.23% from other races, and 0.91% from two or more races. Hispanic or Latino of any race were 0.45% of the population.

There were 203 households, out of which 22.7% had children under the age of 18 living with them, 57.1% were married couples living together, 7.4% had a female householder with no husband present, and 34.0% were non-families. 31.0% of all households were made up of individuals, and 18.7% had someone living alone who was 65 years of age or older. The average household size was 2.17 and the average family size was 2.69.

In the town, the population was spread out, with 20.0% under the age of 18, 5.2% from 18 to 24, 24.3% from 25 to 44, 29.3% from 45 to 64, and 21.1% who were 65 years of age or older. The median age was 46 years. For every 100 females, there were 91.3 males. For every 100 females age 18 and over, there were 81.4 males.

The median income for a household in the town was $45,972, and the median income for a family was $68,750. Males had a median income of $48,750 versus $26,667 for females. The per capita income for the town was $31,929. About 2.9% of families and 4.8% of the population were below the poverty line, including 6.5% of those under age 18 and 5.6% of those age 65 or over.
