= Pinetown, North Carolina =

- Census-designated place
- Location within North Carolina Location within the United States
- Coordinates: 35°36′37″N 76°51′40″W
- Country: United States
- State: North Carolina
- County: Beaufort

Area
  - Total: 1.02 sq mi (2.64 km^{2})
  - Land: 1.02 sq mi (2.64 km^{2})
  - Water: 0 sq mi (0.00 km^{2})
- Elevation: 40 ft (12 m)

Population (2020)
  - Total: 147
  - Density: 144.4/sq mi (55.74/km^{2})
- Time zone: UTC-5 (Eastern (EST))
  - Summer (DST): UTC-4 (EDT)
- ZIP code: 27865
- Area code: 252
- GNIS feature ID: 1021939
- FIPS code: 37-52160

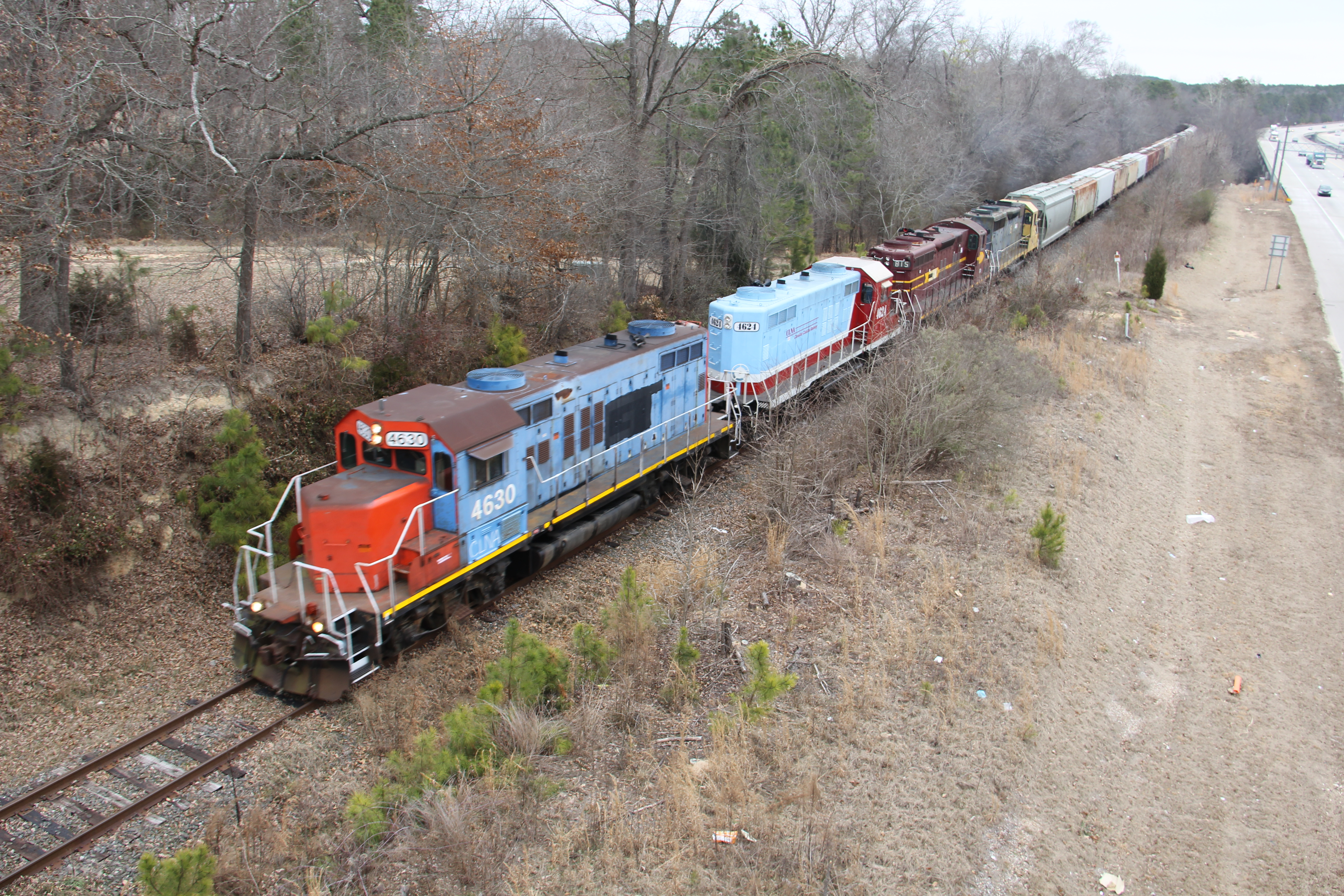
CLNA 199 in Pinetown

Pinetown is an unincorporated community and census-designated place (CDP) in Beaufort County, North Carolina, United States. The population was 147 at the 2020 census.

The community is located in northern Beaufort County in the Coastal Plain region of North Carolina. It is 14 miles (23 km) northeast of Washington, the county seat.

== Demographics ==
Historical population
Census	Pop.	Note	%±
2020	147		—
U.S. Decennial Census
