= Chocowinity, North Carolina =

- Town
- Seal Logo

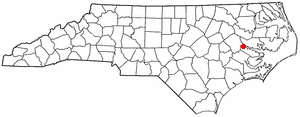
- Location of Chocowinity, North Carolina
- Coordinates: 35°30′53″N 77°06′05″W
- Country: United States
- State: North Carolina
- County: Beaufort

Government
  - Mayor: Jeff Haddock

Area
  - Total: 1.00 sq mi (2.58 km^{2})
  - Land: 1.00 sq mi (2.58 km^{2})
  - Water: 0 sq mi (0.00 km^{2})
- Elevation: 33 ft (10 m)

Population (2020)
  - Total: 722
  - Density: 724.5/sq mi (279.72/km^{2})
- Time zone: UTC-5 (Eastern (EST))
  - Summer (DST): UTC-4 (EDT)
- ZIP code: 27817
- Area code: 252
- FIPS code: 37-12580
- GNIS feature ID: 2406267
- Website: www.chocowinitync.gov

Chocowinity (/ˌtʃɒkəˈwɪnəti/ chok-ə-WIN-ə-tee) is a town in Beaufort County, North Carolina, United States. The population was 722 at the 2020 census. The town is a part of the Washington Area located in North Carolina's Coastal Plains region.

== History ==
The meaning of the name Chocowinity appears to be derived from the Tuscarora word chackauene, meaning "otter" or "little otters." However, most people from the area insist that the name actually means "fish in many waters." In 1928, Rev. N.C. Hughes, D.D., met a well-educated Native American encamped on the banks of the Edisto River in South Carolina. While talking with him, Hughes mentioned he lived in a small village with a Native American name. Hughes pronounced the name "Chocowinity" and also spelled its former name of "Chocawanateth." The Indian thought for a moment and finally responded, "Oh yes, I have it now. That word means FISH FROM MANY WATERS."

In the early 20th century, Chocowinity became the railroad hub of the regional system known as the Norfolk Southern Railway in 1910. The town is sometimes called Marsden as a result of a railroad communications problem. Around 1917, the railway started calling the pivotal location "Marsden", which was easier to spell on a telegraph than "Chocowinity". The source of the new name was apparently taken in honor of one of its financial backers, Marsden J. Perry of New York, who eventually served as president of the railroad.

The regional Norfolk Southern (one of the predecessors of the modern system which adopted the same name) had lines between Norfolk, Virginia and Charlotte and served many locations in southeastern Virginia (including branches to Virginia Beach and Suffolk) and most of eastern and central North Carolina, including Raleigh, Elizabeth City, New Bern, Morehead City, Goldsboro, Durham, Fayetteville, Asheville, and Greenville. The regional carrier was acquired by the Southern Railway, and lent its historic name to the merger with the Norfolk and Western in the early 1980s to form the current large Norfolk Southern Railway System. The railroad resumed using "Chocowinity" to designate the location in 1970, after railway telegraphs were replaced with voice communications via 2-way radios.

The Trinity Episcopal Cemetery was listed on the National Register of Historic Places in 2011.

== Geography ==
According to the United States Census Bureau, the town has a total area of 1.0 square mile (2.6 km^{2}), all land.

== Demographics ==
Historical population
Census	Pop.	Note	%±
1960	580		—
1970	566		−2.4%
1980	644		13.8%
1990	624		−3.1%
2000	733		17.5%
2010	820		11.9%
2020	722		−12.0%
U.S. Decennial Census

=== 2020 census ===
Chocowinity racial composition
Race	Number	Percentage
White (non-Hispanic)	359	49.72%
Black or African American (non-Hispanic)	292	40.44%
Native American	1	0.14%
Asian	4	0.55%
Other/Mixed	22	3.05%
Hispanic or Latino	44	6.09%

As of the 2020 United States census, there were 722 people, 498 households, and 243 families residing in the town.

=== 2000 census ===
As of the census of 2000, there were 733 people, 302 households, and 202 families residing in the town. The population density was 733.5 inhabitants per square mile (283.2/km^{2}). There were 330 housing units at an average density of 330.2 per square mile (127.5/km^{2}). The racial makeup of the town was 60.44% White, 38.74% African American, 0.14% Native American, 0.27% from other races, and 0.41% from two or more races. Hispanic or Latino of any race were 3.41% of the population.

There were 302 households, out of which 25.8% had children under the age of 18 living with them, 50.0% were married couples living together, 13.6% had a female householder with no husband present, and 32.8% were non-families. 28.8% of all households were made up of individuals, and 11.3% had someone living alone who was 65 years of age or older. The average household size was 2.41 and the average family size was 2.94.

In the town, the population was spread out, with 23.5% under the age of 18, 10.0% from 18 to 24, 25.2% from 25 to 44, 25.2% from 45 to 64, and 16.1% who were 65 years of age or older. The median age was 39 years. For every 100 females, there were 89.4 males. For every 100 females age 18 and over, there were 85.1 males.

The median income for a household in the town was $29,712, and the median income for a family was $31,875. Males had a median income of $23,750 versus $18,516 for females. The per capita income for the town was $11,747. About 14.6% of families and 21.3% of the population were below the poverty line, including 34.2% of those under age 18 and 23.9% of those age 65 or over.

Chocowinity has three public schools, one elementary (Grades K–4), one middle (Grades 5–8), and one high school (Grades 9–12). They are:

- Chocowinity Primary School
- Chocowinity Middle School (formerly Chocowinity High School)
- Southside High School

== Notable people ==
- Baron William Henry von Eberstein (1821–1890), German aristocrat and Confederate soldier
- Ronald L. Clark Jr., educator and motivational speaker, known for being the inspiration of the film “The Ron Clark Story”
