= Beaufort County, North Carolina =

County in North Carolina, United States

- County
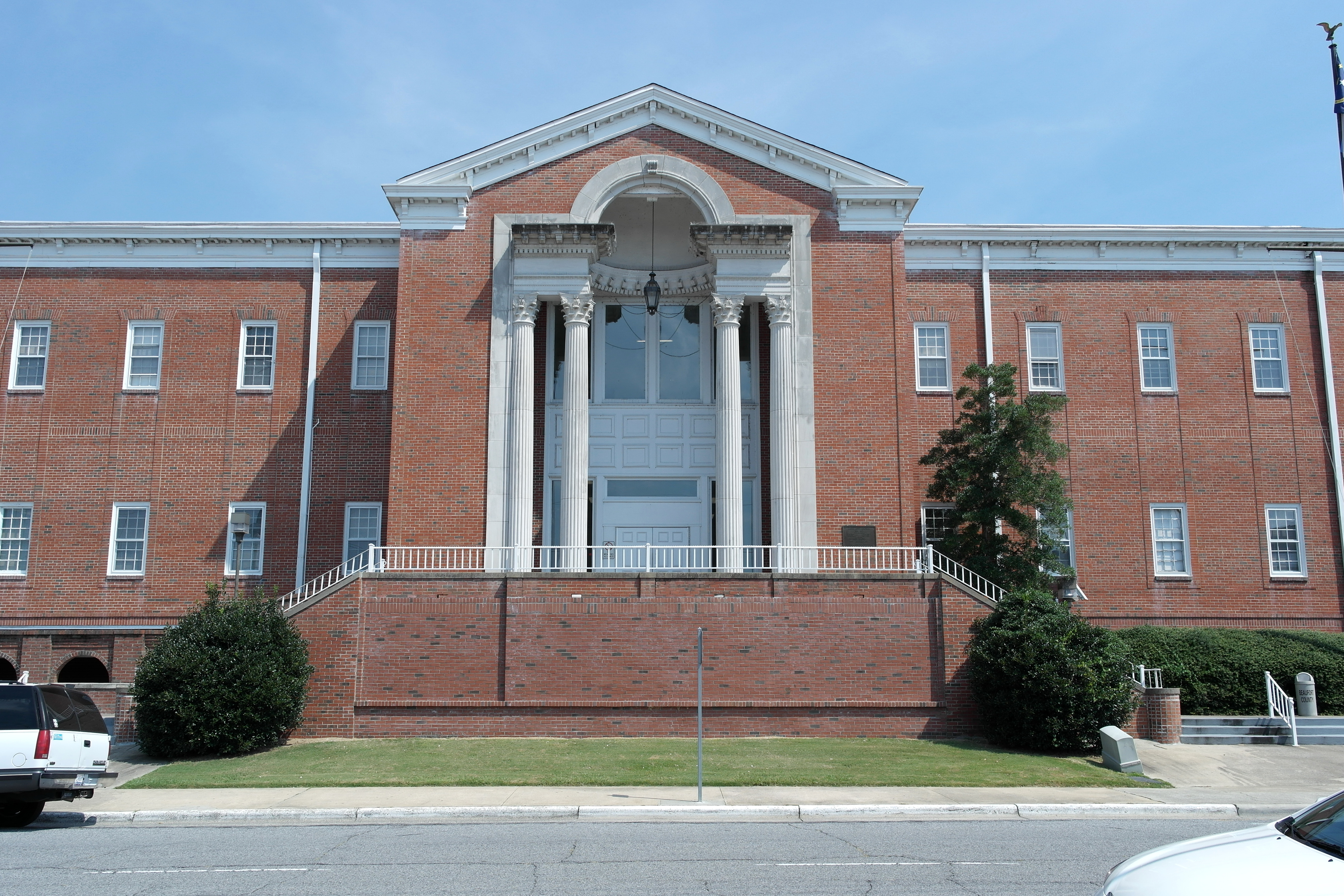
- Beaufort County Courthouse

- Flag Seal

- Location within the U.S. state of North Carolina
- Interactive map of Beaufort County, North Carolina
- Coordinates: 35.48°N 76.84°W
- Country: United States
- State: North Carolina
- Founded: 1712
- Named for: Henry, Duke of Beaufort
- Seat: Washington
- Largest community: Washington

Area
  - Total: 962.85 sq mi (2,493.8 km^{2})
  - Land: 832.74 sq mi (2,156.8 km^{2})
  - Water: 130.11 sq mi (337.0 km^{2}) 13.51%

Population (2020)
  - Total: 44,652
  - Estimate (2025): 44,670 ▲
  - Density: 53.62/sq mi (20.70/km^{2})
- Time zone: UTC−5 (Eastern)
  - Summer (DST): UTC−4 (EDT)
- Congressional district: 3rd
- Website: www.co.beaufort.nc.us

Beaufort County (/ˈboʊfərt/ BOH-fərt) is a county located in the U.S. state of North Carolina. As of the 2020 census, the population was 44,652. Its county seat is Washington. The county was founded in 1705 as Pamptecough Precinct. Originally included in Bath County, it was renamed Beaufort Precinct in 1712 and became Beaufort County in 1739.

Beaufort County comprises the Washington, NC Micropolitan Statistical Area, which is also included in the Greenville-Washington, NC Combined Statistical Area.

== History ==
Beaufort County was first called Pamptecough. The name was changed about 1712 to Beaufort, named for Henry Somerset, 2nd Duke of Beaufort (1684–1714), who became one of Carolina's Lords Proprietor around 1709.

Beaufort County was the site of a proposed Navy outlying landing field. This practice airfield would have allow pilots to simulate landings on an aircraft carrier. Construction was controversial due to its potential ecological impact.

== Geography ==
According to the U.S. Census Bureau, the county has a total area of 962.85 square miles (2,493.8 km^{2}), of which 832.74 square miles (2,156.8 km^{2}) is land and 130.11 square miles (337.0 km^{2}) (13.51%) is water. It is the fifth-largest county in North Carolina by total area. The county is split in half by the Pamlico River.

=== State and local protected areas/sites ===
- Goose Creek Game Land (part)
- Goose Creek State Park
- Historic Bath
- Van Swamp Game Lands (part)
- Voice of America Game Land (part)

=== Major water bodies ===
- Goose Creek
- Intracoastal Waterway
- Pamlico River
- Pungo River
- Blounts Creek
- Tar River

=== Adjacent counties ===
- Martin County – north
- Washington County – northeast
- Hyde County – east
- Pamlico County – south
- Craven County – southwest
- Pitt County – west

=== Major highways ===
- US 17
- US 17 Bus.
- US 264
- US 264 Bus.
- NC 32
- NC 33
- NC 45
- NC 92
- NC 99
- NC 102
- NC 171
- NC 306

=== Major infrastructure ===
- Bayview–Aurora Ferry
- Washington-Warren Field Airport

== Demographics ==
Historical population
Census	Pop.	Note	%±
1790	5,405		—
1800	6,242		15.5%
1810	7,203		15.4%
1820	9,850		36.7%
1830	10,969		11.4%
1840	12,225		11.5%
1850	13,816		13.0%
1860	14,766		6.9%
1870	13,011		−11.9%
1880	17,474		34.3%
1890	21,072		20.6%
1900	26,404		25.3%
1910	30,877		16.9%
1920	31,024		0.5%
1930	35,026		12.9%
1940	36,431		4.0%
1950	37,134		1.9%
1960	36,014		−3.0%
1970	35,980		−0.1%
1980	40,355		12.2%
1990	42,283		4.8%
2000	44,958		6.3%
2010	47,759		6.2%
2020	44,652		−6.5%
2025 (est.)	44,670	▲	0.0%
U.S. Decennial Census; 1790–1960 1900–1990; 1990–2000 2010 2020

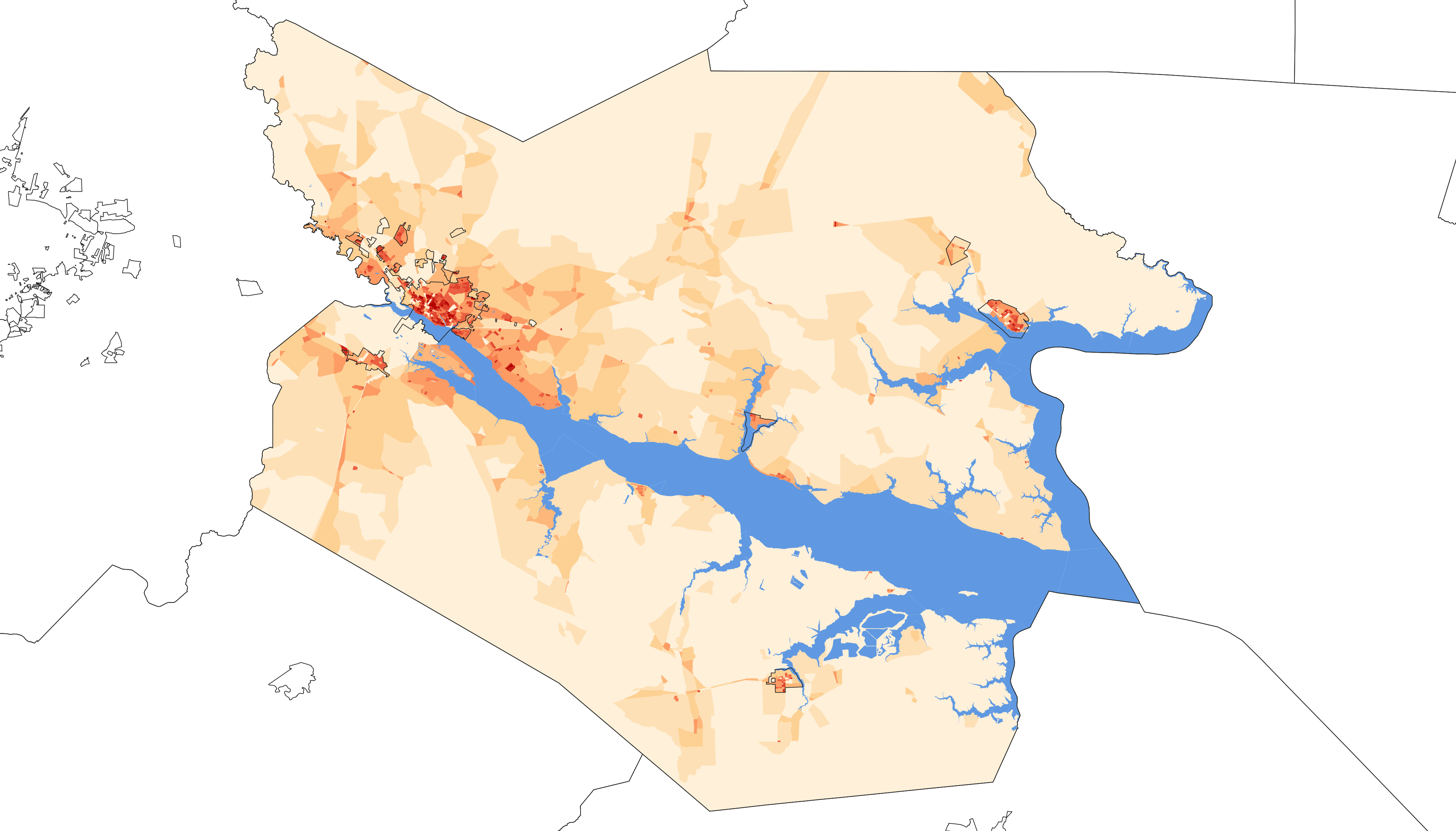
2020 population density of Beaufort County NC by census block

=== Racial and ethnic composition ===
Beaufort County, North Carolina – Racial and ethnic composition Note: the US Census treats Hispanic/Latino as an ethnic category. This table excludes Latinos from the racial categories and assigns them to a separate category. Hispanics/Latinos may be of any race.
Race / Ethnicity (NH = Non-Hispanic)	Pop 1980	Pop 1990	Pop 2000	Pop 2010	Pop 2020	% 1980	% 1990	% 2000	% 2010	% 2020
White alone (NH)	27,413	28,845	30,051	31,705	29,431	67.93%	68.22%	66.84%	66.39%	65.91%
Black or African American alone (NH)	12,649	13,155	13,021	12,105	10,195	31.34%	31.11%	28.96%	25.35%	22.83%
Native American or Alaska Native alone (NH)	16	28	69	116	90	0.04%	0.07%	0.15%	0.24%	0.20%
Asian alone (NH)	33	48	98	158	164	0.08%	0.11%	0.22%	0.33%	0.37%
Native Hawaiian or Pacific Islander alone (NH)	x	x	8	2	16	x	x	0.02%	0.00%	0.04%
Other race alone (NH)	15	10	29	40	122	0.04%	0.02%	0.06%	0.08%	0.27%
Mixed race or Multiracial (NH)	x	x	227	467	1,201	x	x	0.50%	0.98%	2.69%
Hispanic or Latino (any race)	229	197	1,455	3,166	3,433	0.57%	0.47%	3.24%	6.63%	7.69%
Total	40,355	42,283	44,958	47,759	44,652	100.00%	100.00%	100.00%	100.00%	100.00%

=== 2020 census ===
As of the 2020 census, the county had 44,652 people living in 19,430 households, including 12,638 families. The median age was 48.5 years; 19.4% of residents were under the age of 18 and 25.9% were 65 years of age or older. For every 100 females there were 91.9 males, and for every 100 females age 18 and over there were 89.1 males.

The racial makeup of the county was 66.8% White, 23.1% Black or African American, 0.4% American Indian and Alaska Native, 0.4% Asian, <0.1% Native Hawaiian and Pacific Islander, 5.3% from some other race, and 4.1% from two or more races. Hispanic or Latino residents of any race comprised 7.7% of the population.

Of the 19,430 households in the county, 24.7% had children under the age of 18 living in them. Of all households, 45.8% were married-couple households, 18.2% were households with a male householder and no spouse or partner present, and 30.5% were households with a female householder and no spouse or partner present. About 30.8% of all households were made up of individuals and 15.9% had someone living alone who was 65 years of age or older.

There were 24,090 housing units, of which 19.3% were vacant. Among occupied housing units, 71.8% were owner-occupied and 28.2% were renter-occupied. The homeowner vacancy rate was 1.8% and the rental vacancy rate was 7.2%.

37.0% of residents lived in urban areas, while 63.0% lived in rural areas.

=== 2000 census ===
At the 2000 census, there were 44,958 people, 18,319 households, and 12,951 families residing in the county. The population density was 54 people per square mile (21 people/km^{2}). There were 22,139 housing units at an average density of 27 units per square mile (10 units/km^{2}). The racial makeup of the county was 68.44% White, 29.03% Black or African American, 0.16% Native American, 0.22% Asian, 0.02% Pacific Islander, 1.42% from other races, and 0.71% from two or more races. 3.24% of the population were Hispanic or Latino of any race.

There were 18,319 households, out of which 28.80% had children under the age of 18 living with them, 53.60% were married couples living together, 13.30% had a female householder with no husband present, and 29.30% were non-families. 25.70% of all households were made up of individuals, and 11.50% had someone living alone who was 65 years of age or older. The average household size was 2.42 and the average family size was 2.89.

In the county, the population was spread out, with 23.40% under the age of 18, 7.70% from 18 to 24, 26.10% from 25 to 44, 26.90% from 45 to 64, and 15.90% who were 65 years of age or older. The median age was 40 years. For every 100 females there were 91.10 males. For every 100 females age 18 and over, there were 87.50 males.

The median income for a household in the county was $31,066, and the median income for a family was $37,893. Males had a median income of $30,483 versus $21,339 for females. The per capita income for the county was $16,722. About 15.20% of families and 19.50% of the population were below the poverty line, including 27.60% of those under age 18 and 19.30% of those age 65 or over.

=== Ancestry ===
As of 2010, the largest self-reported ancestry groups in Beaufort County were:

Ancestry	Percent (2010)
English (England)	14.4%
American (United States)	11.9%
German (Germany)	6.6%
Irish (Republic of Ireland)	6.0%
Scottish (Scotland)	2.5%
French (France)	1.6%
Italian (Italy)	1.5%

== Government and politics ==
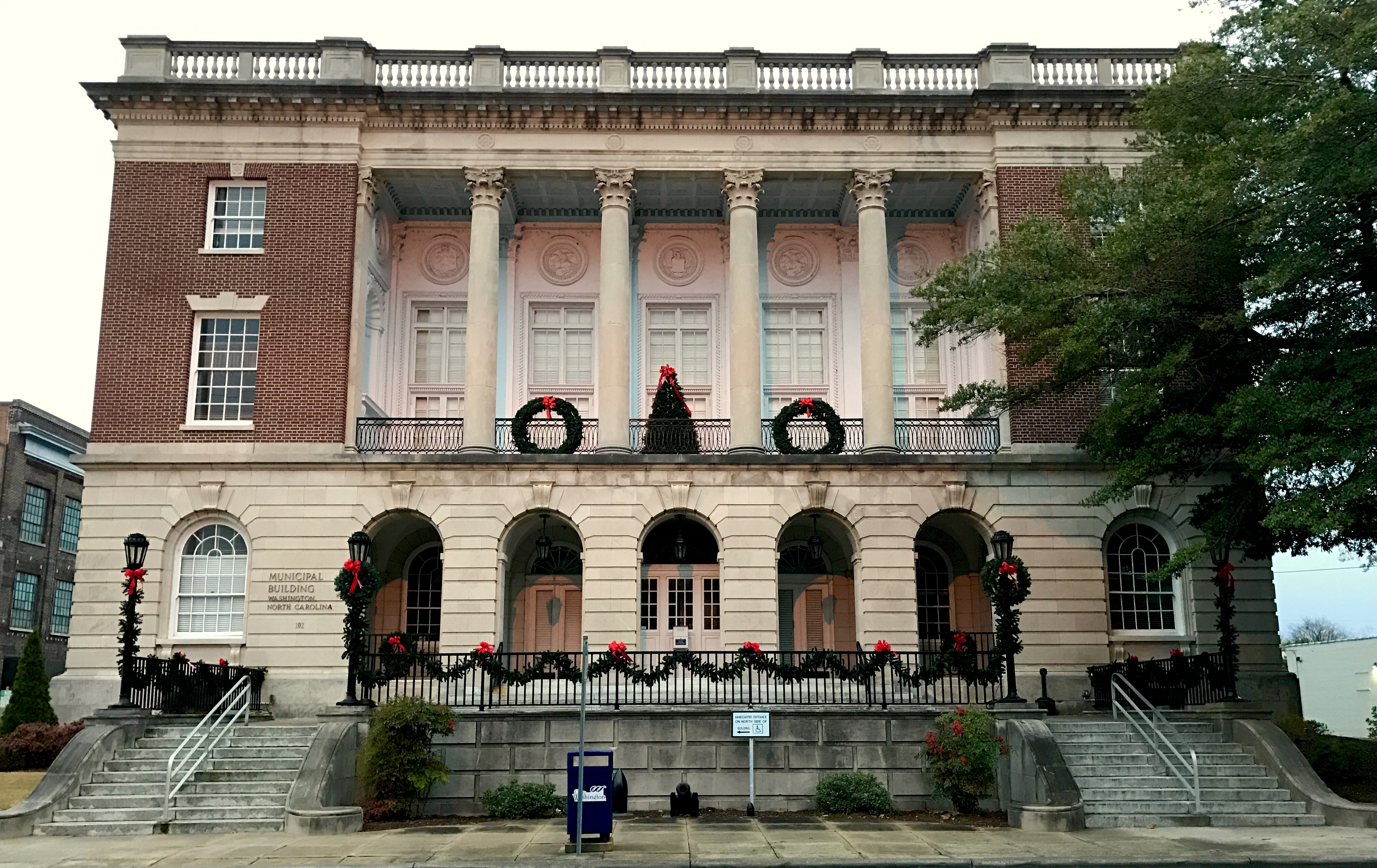
Washington Municipal Building

Beaufort is a typical “Solid South” county in its voting patterns. It voted Democratic consistently up through 1964, even resisting the lure of voting against Al Smith’s Catholic faith and opposition to Prohibition in 1928 when North Carolina went Republican for the only time between 1876 and 1964. However, the increasing social and racial liberalism of the Democratic Party turned its electorate to George Wallace in 1968 and overwhelmingly to Richard Nixon against George McGovern four years later. Since then, Beaufort has been a strongly Republican county, with the last Democrat to carry it being Jimmy Carter in 1976.

Beaufort County is a member of the Mid-East Commission regional council of governments.

United States presidential election results for Beaufort County, North Carolina
Year	Republican		Democratic		Third party(ies)	
Year	No.	%	No.	%	No.	%
1912	295	11.76%	1,605	63.97%	609	24.27%
1916	1,274	39.42%	1,957	60.55%	1	0.03%
1920	2,266	39.15%	3,522	60.85%	0	0.00%
1924	1,502	32.35%	3,048	65.65%	93	2.00%
1928	2,521	41.64%	3,533	58.36%	0	0.00%
1932	839	13.05%	5,552	86.33%	40	0.62%
1936	964	13.58%	6,133	86.42%	0	0.00%
1940	936	14.48%	5,528	85.52%	0	0.00%
1944	1,133	19.40%	4,706	80.60%	0	0.00%
1948	1,055	17.50%	4,675	77.53%	300	4.98%
1952	2,404	30.69%	5,429	69.31%	0	0.00%
1956	2,277	28.44%	5,730	71.56%	0	0.00%
1960	2,694	30.85%	6,039	69.15%	0	0.00%
1964	3,595	37.12%	6,090	62.88%	0	0.00%
1968	2,669	23.03%	3,232	27.89%	5,686	49.07%
1972	6,915	69.65%	2,901	29.22%	112	1.13%
1976	4,677	44.68%	5,728	54.72%	62	0.59%
1980	6,773	51.95%	6,024	46.21%	240	1.84%
1984	9,284	60.66%	5,987	39.12%	33	0.22%
1988	8,190	60.35%	5,352	39.44%	28	0.21%
1992	7,337	45.91%	6,445	40.33%	2,198	13.75%
1996	8,154	53.59%	6,172	40.57%	889	5.84%
2000	10,531	60.83%	6,634	38.32%	148	0.85%
2004	12,432	63.68%	7,025	35.99%	65	0.33%
2008	13,460	58.50%	9,454	41.09%	96	0.42%
2012	13,977	59.17%	9,435	39.94%	208	0.88%
2016	14,543	60.75%	8,764	36.61%	631	2.64%
2020	16,437	62.46%	9,633	36.61%	245	0.93%
2024	17,296	65.09%	9,049	34.05%	227	0.85%

== Education ==
Beaufort County Schools is the local public school system.

== Communities ==
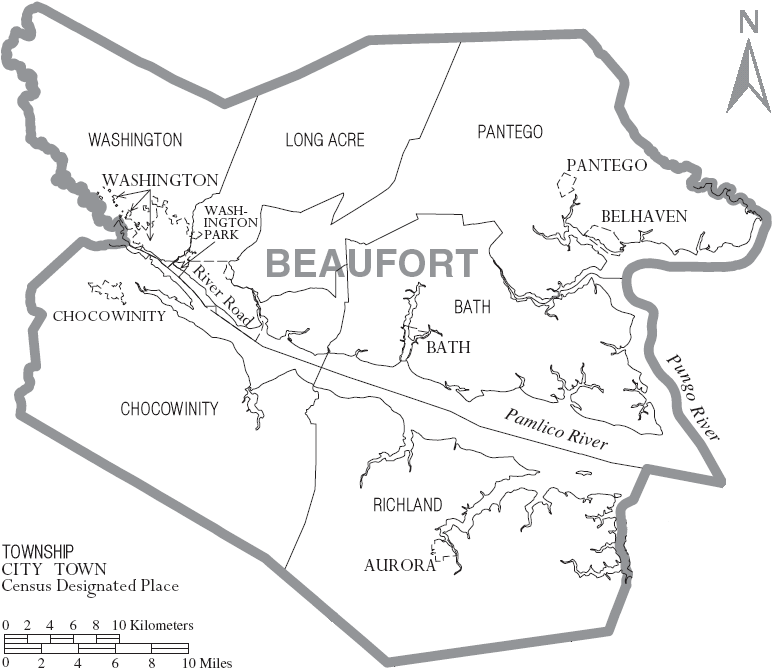
Map of Beaufort County with municipal and township labels

=== City ===
- Washington (county seat and largest community)

=== Towns ===
- Aurora
- Bath
- Belhaven
- Chocowinity
- Pantego
- Washington Park

=== Census-designated places ===
- Bayview
- Cypress Landing
- Pinetown
- River Road

=== Townships ===
- Bath
- Chocowinity
- Long Acre
- Pantego
- Richland
- Washington

=== Other unincorporated communities ===
- Blounts Creek
- Edward
- Royal

=== Population ranking ===
The population ranking of the following table is based on the 2020 census of Beaufort County.

† = county seat

Rank	Name	Type	Population (2020 census)
1	† Washington	City	9,875
2	River Road	CDP	4,048
3	Belhaven	Town	1,410
4	Chocowinity	Town	722
5	Aurora	Town	455
6	Washington Park	Town	392
7	Bayview	CDP	298
8	Bath	Town	245
9	Pantego	Town	164
10	Pinetown	CDP	147

== See also ==
- List of counties in North Carolina
- National Register of Historic Places listings in Beaufort County, North Carolina
