= 2020 North Carolina Secretary of State election =

- November 3, 2020
- Turnout: 75.35%
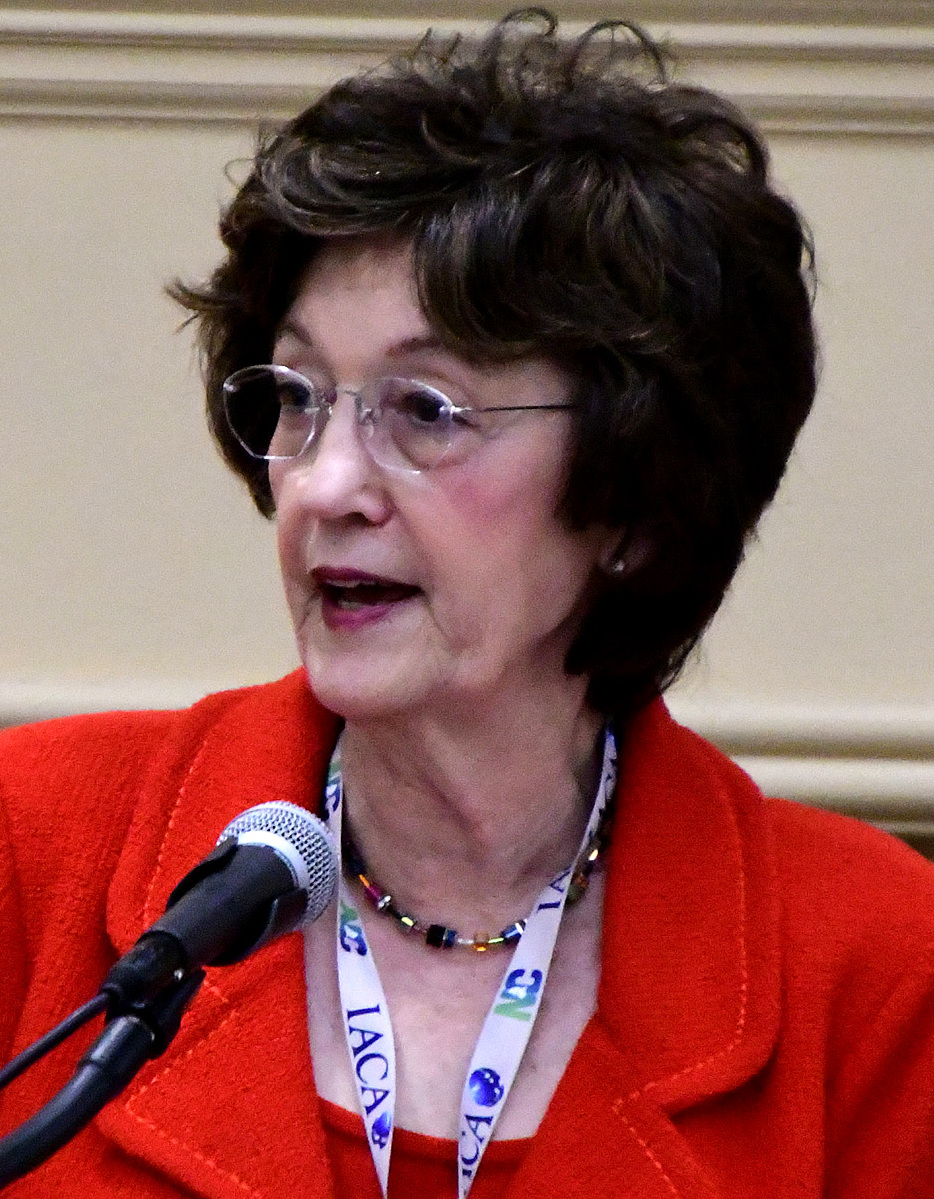

Candidate	Elaine Marshall	E.C. Sykes
Party	Democratic	Republican
Popular vote	2,755,571	2,630,559
Percentage	51.16%	48.84%
- Marshall: 50-60% 60-70% 70-80% 80–90% >90%; Sykes: 50-60% 60-70% 70-80% 80-90% >90%
Secretary of State before election
Elaine Marshall
Democratic
Elected Secretary of State
Elaine Marshall
Democratic

The 2020 North Carolina Secretary of State election was held on November 3, 2020, to elect the North Carolina Secretary of State, concurrently with elections for president of the United States, the United States Senate, U.S. House of Representatives, governor, Council of State, and other state, local and judicial elections.

Incumbent Democratic secretary of state Elaine Marshall won re-election to a seventh term in office, defeating businessman E.C. Sykes.

== Democratic primary ==
The Democratic primary for Secretary of State was cancelled. No votes were tallied, and incumbent Elaine Marshall became the Democratic nominee automatically.

=== Candidates ===
==== Nominee ====
- Elaine Marshall, incumbent secretary of state (1997–present)

== Republican primary ==
=== Candidates ===
==== Nominee ====
- E.C. Sykes, former manufacturing CEO

==== Eliminated in primary ====
- Chad Brown, member of the Gaston County Board of Commissioners
- Michael LaPaglia, museum curator and nominee for Secretary of State in 2016

=== Endorsements ===
E.C. Sykes

U.S. senators

- Ted Cruz, U.S. senator from Texas (2013–present) and candidate for president in 2016

Individuals

- James Dobson, author and founder of Focus on the Family

Newspapers and other media

- Rhino Times (Republican primary only)

=== Polling ===
Poll source	Date(s) administered	Sample size (Note: Key: A – all adults RV – registered voters LV – likely voters V – unclear)	Margin of error	Chad Brown	Michael LaPaglia	E.C. Sykes	Undecided
Harper Polling/Civitas Institute	December 2–4, 2019	500 (LV)	± 4.38%	20%	4%	5%	71%

=== Results ===
Results by county Sykes: 30–40%; 40–50%; 50–60%; 60–70%; Brown: 30–40%; 40–50%; 50–60%; 60–70%; LaPaglia: 30–40%; 40–50%

Republican primary results
Party	Candidate	Votes	%
Republican	E.C. Sykes	296,457	42.91%
Republican	Chad Brown	262,595	38.01%
Republican	Michael LaPaglia	131,832	19.08%
Total votes		690,884	100.00%

== General election ==
=== Post-primary endorsements ===
Elaine Marshall (D)

Newspapers and other media

- The Charlotte Observer
- Indy Week
- The News & Observer

Organizations

- Susan B. Anthony List

=== Predictions ===
Source	Ranking	As of
The Cook Political Report	Likely D	October 28, 2020
Elections Daily	Lean D	September 15, 2020

=== Polling ===
Poll source	Date(s) administered	Sample size	Margin of error	Elaine Marshall (D)	E.C. Sykes (R)	Undecided
Cardinal Point Analytics	July 13–15, 2020	547 (LV)	± 4.2%	47%	39%	14%

=== Results ===
2020 North Carolina Secretary of State election
Party	Candidate	Votes	%
Democratic	Elaine Marshall (incumbent)	2,755,571	51.16%
Republican	E.C. Sykes	2,630,559	48.84%
Total votes		5,386,130	100.00%
Democratic hold			

==== By congressional district ====
Despite losing the state, Sykes won 8 of 13 congressional districts.

District	Marshall	Sykes	Representative
1st	58%	42%	G. K. Butterfield
2nd	66%	34%	Deborah Ross
3rd	41%	59%	Greg Murphy
4th	68%	32%	David Price
5th	35%	65%	Virginia Foxx
6th	63%	37%	Kathy Manning
7th	44%	56%	David Rouzer
8th	49%	51%	Richard Hudson
9th	47%	53%	Dan Bishop
10th	34%	66%	Patrick McHenry
11th	44%	56%	Madison Cawthorn
12th	71%	29%	Alma Adams
13th	35%	65%	Ted Budd
