= 2024 North Carolina Secretary of State election =

- November 5, 2024
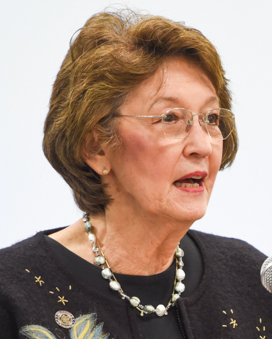

Nominee	Elaine Marshall	Chad Brown
Party	Democratic	Republican
Popular vote	2,837,994	2,722,794
Percentage	51.04%	48.96%
- Marshall: 50–60% 60–70% 70–80% 80–90% >90% Brown: 50–60% 60–70% 70–80% 80–90% >90% No votes
Secretary of State before election
Elaine Marshall
Democratic
Elected Secretary of State
Elaine Marshall
Democratic

The 2024 North Carolina Secretary of State election was held on November 5, 2024, to elect the secretary of state of North Carolina, concurrently with the 2024 U.S. presidential election, as well as elections to the United States Senate, elections to the United States House of Representatives, and various other state and local elections. Incumbent Democratic Secretary of State Elaine Marshall won re-election to an eighth term in office. This was the only Democratic-held secretary of state held up for election in 2024 in a state Donald Trump won in 2020. Primary elections took place on March 5, 2024.

== Democratic primary ==
=== Candidates ===
==== Nominee ====
- Elaine Marshall, incumbent secretary of state (1997–present)

== Republican primary ==
Results by county: Brown: 30–40%; 40–50%; 50–60%; 60–70%; Villaverde: 30–40%; 40–50%; Thomas: 30–40%; 40–50%

=== Candidates ===
==== Nominee ====
- Chad Brown, Gaston County commissioner and candidate for secretary of state in 2020

==== Eliminated in primary ====
- Jesse Thomas, retired healthcare executive
- Christine Villaverde, disaster response consultant and nominee for North Carolina's 2nd congressional district in 2022

==== Withdrawn ====
- Darren Eustance, former chair of the Wake County Republican Party (ran for Wake County Commission)

=== Results ===
Republican primary results
Party	Candidate	Votes	%
Republican	Chad Brown	373,166	43.26%
Republican	Christine Villaverde	258,569	29.98%
Republican	Jesse Thomas	230,829	26.76%
Total votes		862,564	100.0%

== General election ==
=== Predictions ===
Source	Ranking	As of
Sabato's Crystal Ball	Lean D	July 25, 2024

=== Polling ===
Poll source	Date(s) administered	Sample size (Note: Key: A – all adults RV – registered voters LV – likely voters V – unclear)	Margin of error	Elaine Marshall (D)	Chad Brown (R)	Undecided
ActiVote	October 8–26, 2024	400 (LV)	± 4.9%	51%	49%	–
Cygnal (R) (Note: Poll sponsored by Carolina Journal)	October 12–14, 2024	600 (LV)	± 4.0%	45%	43%	12%
ActiVote	August 20 – September 22, 2024	400 (LV)	± 4.9%	51%	49%	–
Cygnal (R)	September 15–16, 2024	600 (LV)	± 3.99%	43%	42%	15%

=== Results ===
2024 North Carolina Secretary of State election
Party	Candidate	Votes	%	±%
Democratic	Elaine Marshall (incumbent)	2,837,994	51.04%	–0.12%
Republican	Chad Brown	2,722,794	48.96%	+0.12%
Total votes		5,560,788	100.0%	
Democratic hold				

Counties that flipped from Democratic to Republican

- Granville (largest city: Oxford)
- Pasquotank (largest city: Elizabeth City)
- Scotland (largest city: Laurinburg)

==== By congressional district ====
Despite losing the state, Brown won ten of 14 congressional districts.

District	Marshall	Brown	Representative
1st	52%	48%	Don Davis
2nd	70%	30%	Deborah Ross
3rd	43%	57%	Greg Murphy
4th	75%	25%	Valerie Foushee
5th	44%	56%	Virginia Foxx
6th	44%	56%	Addison McDowell
7th	46%	54%	David Rouzer
8th	42%	58%	Mark Harris
9th	45%	55%	Richard Hudson
10th	43%	57%	Pat Harrigan
11th	47%	53%	Chuck Edwards
12th	74%	26%	Alma Adams
13th	46%	54%	Brad Knott
14th	44%	56%	Tim Moore

== Notes ==
Partisan clients
