= Octavius Coke =

American lawyer and politician

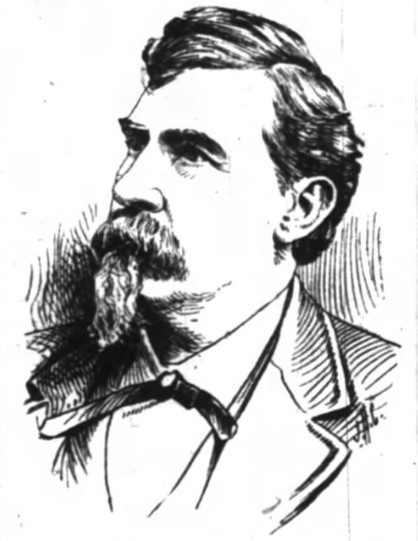

Secretary of State of North Carolina
- In office April 4, 1891 – August 30, 1895
- Governor: Daniel Gould Fowle; Thomas Michael Holt; Elias Carr
- Preceded by: William L. Saunders
- Succeeded by: Charles M. Cooke

Personal details
- Born: October 4, 1840 Williamsburg, Virginia, United States
- Died: August 30, 1895 (aged 54) Raleigh, North Carolina, U.S.
- Party: Democratic Party

Octavius Coke (October 4, 1840 – August 30, 1895) was an American lawyer and politician. A Democrat, he served in the North Carolina Senate and as North Carolina Secretary of State from 1891 to 1895. Born in Virginia, he read law and opened a legal practice in Williamsburg before enlisting in the Confederate States Army. He quickly attained the rank of captain and was wounded several times throughout the war. After the conflict ended he established a law practice in Edenton, North Carolina.

Taking an interest in politics, Coke was elected as a Democrat to serve in the North Carolina Senate in 1876. In 1880 he moved to Raleigh where he remained active in Democratic politics. In April 1891 he was appointed Secretary of State by the governor to fill a vacancy. Elected to a full term the following year, he served in that capacity until his death.

== Early life ==
Coke was born on October 4, 1840, in Williamsburg, Virginia, United States, to John Coke and Eliza Hawkins. He was a nephew of Virginia politician Richard Coke Jr.. His brother Richard later became a politician in Texas. Octavius attended the College of William & Mary from 1857 to 1858 and did not graduate. Nevertheless, he read law and opened a legal practice in Williamsburg shortly before the outbreak of the American Civil War.

With the beginning of the war, Coke enlisted in the Williamsburg Junior Guards of the Confederate States Army. The unit later became Company C of the 32nd Virginia Infantry Regiment. He rose rapidly through the ranks and was elected captain on May 11, 1862. Coke was wounded several times during the war, incurring his most severe injuries during the Battle of Five Forks and the Seven Days Battles.

== Political career ==
After the war, Coke moved to Edenton, North Carolina, and opened a law practice. In 1867, he married Caroline Wood, with whom he would have two children. Taking an interest in politics, Coke unsuccessfully ran to be a Conservative delegate at the 1868 state constitutional convention. In 1872 he served as a presidential elector for Horace Greeley. His wife died in 1876. That year he was elected as a Democrat to serve in the North Carolina Senate, representing Chowan County. In the Senate he became a key Democratic floor leader. In 1879, he married Kate Fisher, with whom he would have four children.

In 1880, Coke permanently relocated to Raleigh. Remaining active in Democratic affairs, he chaired the party's state executive committee that year and was credited by some of contemporaries for helping the party secure large victories in that year's legislative elections. In 1884, Coke sought the Democratic gubernatorial nomination at the party's state convention but was narrowly defeated by Alfred Moore Scales. He denounced Prohibition during an 1886 referendum on alcohol sales in Raleigh. In 1889, Governor Daniel Gould Fowle appointed him to the board of directors of the state insane asylum.

On April 4, 1891, Governor Fowle appointed Coke to serve as North Carolina Secretary of State to fill a vacancy created by the death of incumbent William L. Saunders. Coke won a full term to the office in the following year's general elections.

== Death ==
Coke died at his home in Raleigh on August 30, 1895. He was buried in Oakwood Cemetery. The News and Observer of Raleigh printed an obituary which praised him as a man of principle. The paper's publisher, Josephus Daniels, described Coke as "a gallant Confederate soldier, and an eloquent orator and advocate, with personal charm." Governor Elias Carr appointed Charles M. Cooke to replace Coke at the secretariat of state. The University of North Carolina has a collection of his family papers.

== Works cited ==
- Cheney, John L. Jr., ed. (1981). North Carolina Government, 1585-1979 : A Narrative and Statistical History (revised ed.). Raleigh: North Carolina Secretary of State. OCLC 1290270510.

Party political offices
Preceded by William L. Saunders	Democratic nominee for North Carolina Secretary of State; 1892	Succeeded by Charles M. Cooke
Political offices
Preceded by Octavius Coke	Secretary of State of North Carolina; 1895–1897	Succeeded by Cyrus Thompson
