= Saunders Hall =

Saunders Hall may refer to:

- Goode-Hall House, a plantation house on the U.S. National Register of Historic Places
- Saunders Hall (Chapel Hill, North Carolina), now Carolina Hall, a structure on the campus of the University of North Carolina at Chapel Hill
- Saunders Hall, the main building of the University of Virginia Darden School of Business in Charlottesville, Virginia
- Saunders Hall, an academic building on the Campus of Virginia Tech in Blacksburg, Virginia
