= Richard M. Norment =

American physician, politician, and military officer (1829–1912)

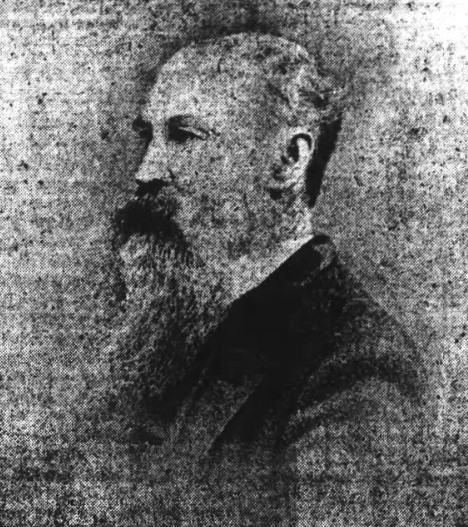
Richard M. Norment

Richard Montgomery Norment (February 1, 1829 – July 26, 1912) was an American physician, politician, and military officer.

== Early life ==
Richard Montgomery Norment was born on February 1, 1829, in Sharon Township, Mecklenburg County, North Carolina. He spent most of his youth living in the city of Charlotte and attended high school there for three years.

== Career and military service ==
When he was 17 years of age, Norment volunteered for service in the Mexican–American War. He served under General Winfield Scott, participating in the Siege of Veracruz and the Battle for Mexico City. Being discharged from service three years later, he went to Castleton, Vermont, to study medicine. He later continued his studies in Charleston, South Carolina. In 1853 he moved to Lumberton, North Carolina, and opened a medical practice. In 1860 he married May F. Norment, a cousin of his, and they had five children. Shortly thereafter, he organized a company of troops and became its captain. The company disbanded in Norfolk, Virginia, six months later and he returned to Lumberton to organize Company A of the 46th North Carolina Infantry Regiment. He led the company as a captain and eventually a major through the duration of the American Civil War. Five of his brothers were killed during the war. He was eventually captured and, upon being paroled, returned to Lumberton.

After the end of the war, Norment resumed the practice of medicine. Many residents fled the Lumberton during a smallpox outbreak during the winter of 1865 and 1866, but Norment remained to care for the sick and bury the dead. Garnering interest in politics, he was elected to the North Carolina State Senate district for Robeson as a Democrat in 1870. That year his brother, militia captain Owen C. Norment, was killed by the Lowry Gang during the Lowry War. Despite this, Norment proposed a compromise with the outlaws whereby the governor would pardon them for their previous actions and in exchange they would abandon their activities and pledge an oath to obey the law. The plan was eventually rejected by regional politicians and the press in 1871.

Holding an adverse opinion on the impeachment of Governor William Woods Holden with regards to the opinions of many Democrats in Robeson County, Norment lost the party's nomination for the subsequent legislative election. Norment then ran as an independent for the Senate seat representing a redrawn district including Robeson and Columbus counties, and lost. His wife died in 1874. In 1875 he won election to a state constitutional convention as a Democrat.

Norment unsuccessfully opposed the expulsion of Representative J. Williams Thorne, a Quaker, from the House in 1875 for blasphemy. The following year he ran as the Republican nominee for the office of secretary of state. In 1878 he won election to the North Carolina House of Representatives as a Republican. In March 1880 he introduced a successful motion to expunge the expulsion of Representative Thorne.

In 1880 Norment moved to Charlotte to tend to his father's business. He returned to Lumberton in 1886 and, on December 22, married his second wife, Maggie Rogers. He successfully ran as a Republican for a House seat in 1885, and served as president of the North Carolina Railroad from 1896 to 1897. President William McKinley appointed him postmaster of Lumberton in 1900.

== Later life ==
In 1910, Norment became increasingly ill and confined to his home. He retained the title of postmaster but was unable to exercise his duties. In July 1912 his condition worsened and he became unable to sit upright. Growing jaundiced, he died in his asleep early in the morning on July 26. At the time of his death, he was the oldest-known resident of Lumberton and one of the last-surviving North Carolinian veterans of the Mexican–American War. A funeral was held five days later, for which the post office and all stores in Lumberton closed. He was buried in a local family cemetery and his friends erected a monument to mark the burial site.

== Works cited ==
- Evans, William McKee (1971). To Die Game: The Story of the Lowry Band, Indian Guerillas of Reconstruction. Baton Rouge: Louisiana State University Press. ISBN 9780807108161.
- Lawrence, Robert C. (1939). The State of Robeson. Lumberton. OCLC 3570522.
- Longley, Max (2020). Quaker Carpetbagger: J. Williams Thorne, Underground Railroad Host Turned North Carolina Politician. McFarland. ISBN 9781476637747.

Party political offices
Preceded by Jonathan W. Albertson	Republican nominee for North Carolina Secretary of State; 1876	Succeeded by William G. Candler
