= Grimesland, North Carolina =

- Town
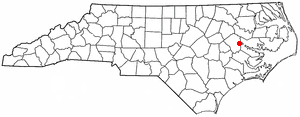
- Location of Grimesland, North Carolina
- Coordinates: 35°33′44″N 77°11′29″W
- Country: United States
- State: North Carolina
- County: Pitt

Area
  - Total: 0.68 sq mi (1.76 km^{2})
  - Land: 0.68 sq mi (1.76 km^{2})
  - Water: 0 sq mi (0.00 km^{2})
- Elevation: 43 ft (13 m)

Population (2020)
  - Total: 386−388
  - Density: 567.5/sq mi (219.12/km^{2})
- Time zone: UTC-5 (Eastern (EST))
  - Summer (DST): UTC-4 (EDT)
- ZIP code: 27837
- Area code: 252
- FIPS code: 37-28240
- GNIS feature ID: 2406622
- Website: grimesland.org

Grimesland is a town in Pitt County, North Carolina, United States. At the 2020 census, the population was 386. The town is a part of the Greenville Metropolitan Area located in North Carolina's Inner Banks.

== History ==
Grimesland was named for Gen. Bryan Grimes. The town was laid out on Grimes' plantation.

Grimesland Plantation was added to the National Register of Historic Places in 1971.

== Geography ==
According to the United States Census Bureau, the town has a total area of 0.5 square miles (1.3 km^{2}), all land.

== Demographics ==
Historical population
Census	Pop.	Note	%±
1900	277		—
1910	330		19.1%
1920	463		40.3%
1930	377		−18.6%
1940	405		7.4%
1950	414		2.2%
1960	362		−12.6%
1970	394		8.8%
1980	453		15.0%
1990	469		3.5%
2000	440		−6.2%
2010	441		0.2%
2020	386		−12.5%
U.S. Decennial Census

As of the census of 2000, there were 440 people, 174 households, and 116 families residing in the town. The population density was 890.4 inhabitants per square mile (343.8/km^{2}). There were 187 housing units at an average density of 378.4 per square mile (146.1/km^{2}). The racial makeup of the town was 62.05% White, 29.09% African American, 0.23% Asian, 7.73% from other races, and 0.91% from two or more races. Hispanic or Latino of any race were 8.86% of the population.

There were 174 households, out of which 27.6% had children under the age of 18 living with them, 47.7% were married couples living together, 14.4% had a female householder with no husband present, and 32 .8% were non-families. 27.0% of all households were made up of individuals, and 13.2% had someone living alone who was 65 years of age or older. The average household size was 2.53 and the average family size was 3.06.

In the town, the population was spread out, with 24.1% under the age of 18, 7.3% from 18 to 24, 29.8% from 25 to 44, 23.6% from 45 to 64, and 15.2% who were 65 years of age or older. The median age was 38 years. For every 100 females, there were 97.3 males. For every 100 females age 18 and over, there were 88.7 males.

The median income for a household in the town was $28,672, and the median income for a family was $36,250. Males had a median income of $27,857 versus $18,750 for females. The per capita income for the town was $14,204. About 12.3% of families and 16.7% of the population were below the poverty line, including 18.4% of those under age 18 and 29.2% of those age 65 or over.
