= John Bryan Grimes =

American politician

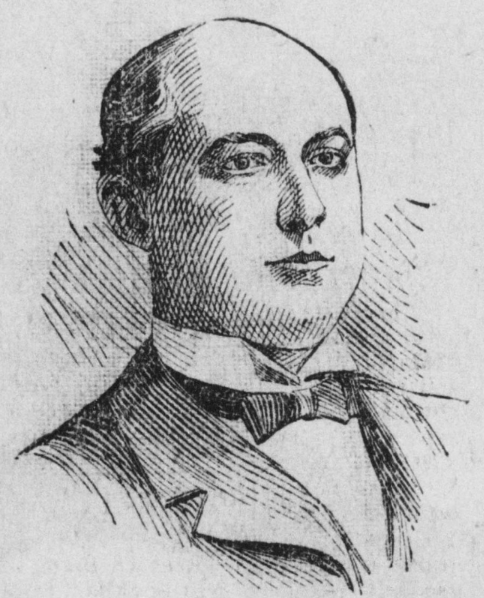
- Engraving of Grimes, 1901

15th Secretary of State of North Carolina
- In office 1901–1923
- Governor: Charles B. Aycock; Robert Broadnax Glenn; William Walton Kitchin; Locke Craig; Thomas Walter Bickett; Cameron A. Morrison
- Preceded by: Cyrus Thompson
- Succeeded by: William N. Everett

Personal details
- Born: 1868
- Died: 1923 (aged 54–55)
- Party: Democratic
- Parent: Bryan Grimes (father)
- Relatives: John Heritage Bryan (grandfather)
- Education: University of North Carolina at Chapel Hill; Bryant & Stratton College
- Profession: Politician, farmer

John Bryan Grimes (1868–1923) was a North Carolina Democratic politician and farmer who served as North Carolina Secretary of State from 1901 until his death in 1923.

He was the son of Confederate Major General Bryan Grimes and the grandson of Congressman John Heritage Bryan.

Grimes grew up on the family plantation, "Grimesland," in Pitt County. He was educated at several North Carolina private schools, and then at the University of North Carolina at Chapel Hill (1882–1885) before completing his education at Bryant and Stratton Business College in Baltimore. He worked on the staff of Governor Elias Carr. Grimes served as president of the North Carolina Tobacco Growers Association, was a member of the North Carolina Farmers Alliance, and in 1899 was appointed to the North Carolina Board of Agriculture. While serving as secretary of state, Grimes also served on and chaired the North Carolina Historical Commission.

Party political offices
Preceded by Charles M. Cooke	Democratic nominee for North Carolina Secretary of State; 1900, 1904, 1908, 1912, 1916, 1920	Succeeded by William N. Everett
Political offices
Preceded by Cyrus Thompson	Secretary of State of North Carolina; 1901–1923	Succeeded by William N. Everett
