= 46th North Carolina Infantry Regiment =

Infantry regiment of the Confederate States Army

- Active: March 1, 1862 – April 9, 1865
- Country: Confederate States of America
- Allegiance: North Carolina
- Branch: Confederate States Army
- Type: Infantry
- Engagements: American Civil War: Seven Days Battles; Antietam; Fredericksburg; Bristoe Campaign; Battle of the Wilderness; Spotsylvania; Cold Harbor; Siege of Petersburg; Appomattox Campaign

The 46th North Carolina Infantry Regiment was a volunteer infantry regiment that served in the Confederate Army during the American Civil War. Mustered early in the war near Raleigh, North Carolina, the regiment served in both Walker's Brigade and Cooke's Brigade during the war.

== Service ==
The 46th was part of the Army of Northern Virginia from its initial muster through the end of the war, seeing action in the major eastern campaigns in Virginia and Maryland in 1862.

At Antietam, the 46th was involved in some of the heaviest fighting of the day. They had been ordered to hold West Woods, at "all hazards." According to the Brig. General John George Walker's after-action report, the 46th "did good service." Joined to Ransom's Brigade, the regiment held the Woods "for the greater portion of the day, notwithstanding three determined infantry attacks, which each time were repulsed with great loss to the enemy, and against a most persistent and terrific artillery fire, by which the enemy hoped, doubtless, to drive us from our strong position — the very key of the battle-field."

After Fredericksburg, the 46th was shifted to garrison duty in South Carolina until June 1863, in that month being reassigned to northern Virginia. They returned north too late to participate in Gettysburg, but were back in the ranks of the ANV for the Bristoe Campaign of October, 1863.

The 46th finally surrendered at Appomattox Courthouse on April 9, 1865.

== Total strength and casualties ==
At the end, the 46th surrendered with 15 officers and 102 men.

== Commanders ==
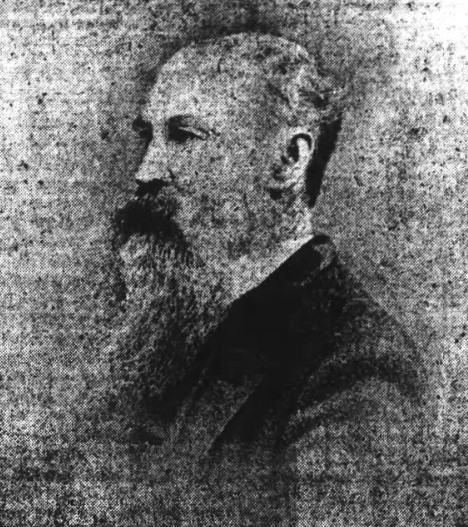
Richard M. Norment

- Col. Edward Dudley Hall
- Lt. Col. William Alexander Jenkins
- Lt. Col. Alexander Cary McAlister
- Maj. Neill McKay McNeill
- Maj. Rush J. Mitchell
- Maj. Richard M. Norment
- Col. William L. Saunders

== See also ==
- North Carolina in the American Civil War
