= 4th North Carolina Infantry Regiment =

Infantry regiment of the Confederate States Army

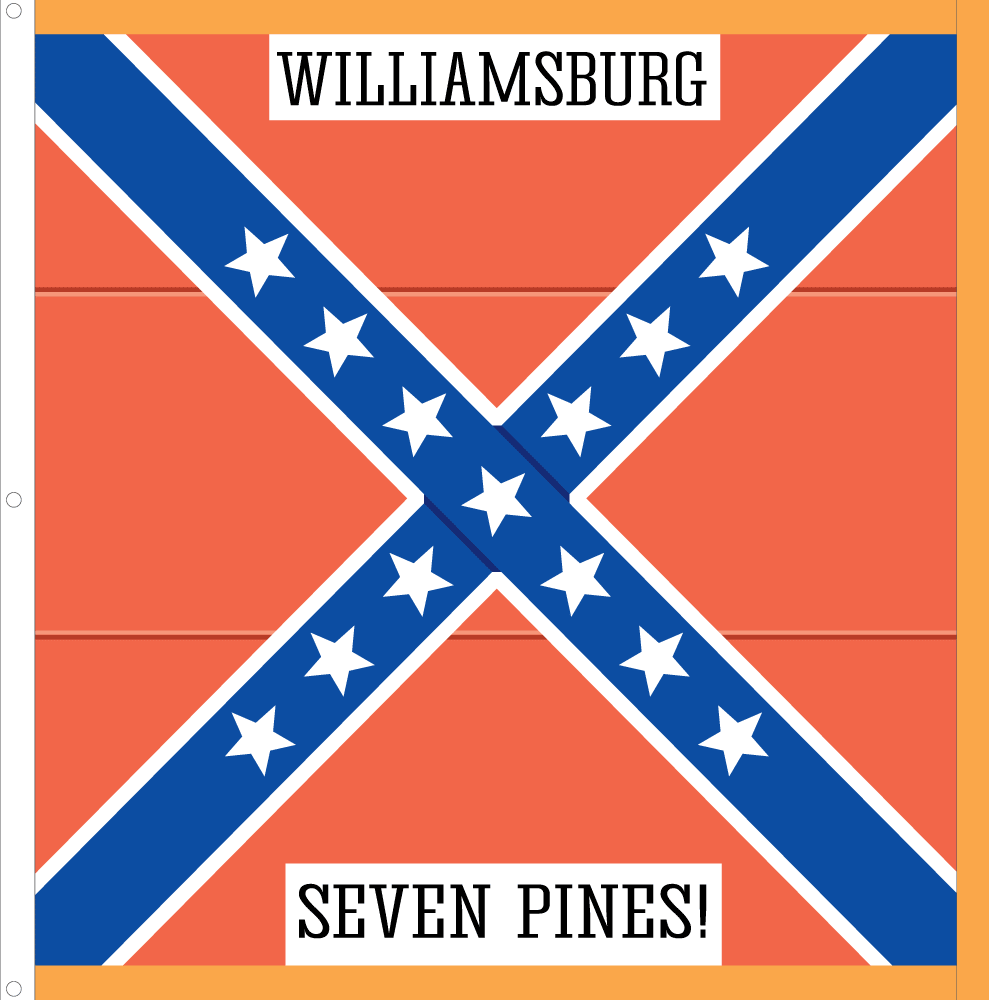
- 4th North Carolina battle flag (1862)
- Active: 1861 to April 9, 1865
- Country: Confederate States of America
- Allegiance: North Carolina
- Branch: Confederate States Army
- Type: Infantry
- Engagements: American Civil War: Peninsular Campaign; Maryland Campaign; Battle of Fredericksburg; Battle of Chancellorsville; Gettysburg campaign; Bristoe Campaign; Mine Run Campaign; Wilderness Campaign; Valley Campaigns of 1864; Richmond-Petersburg Campaign; Appomattox Campaign

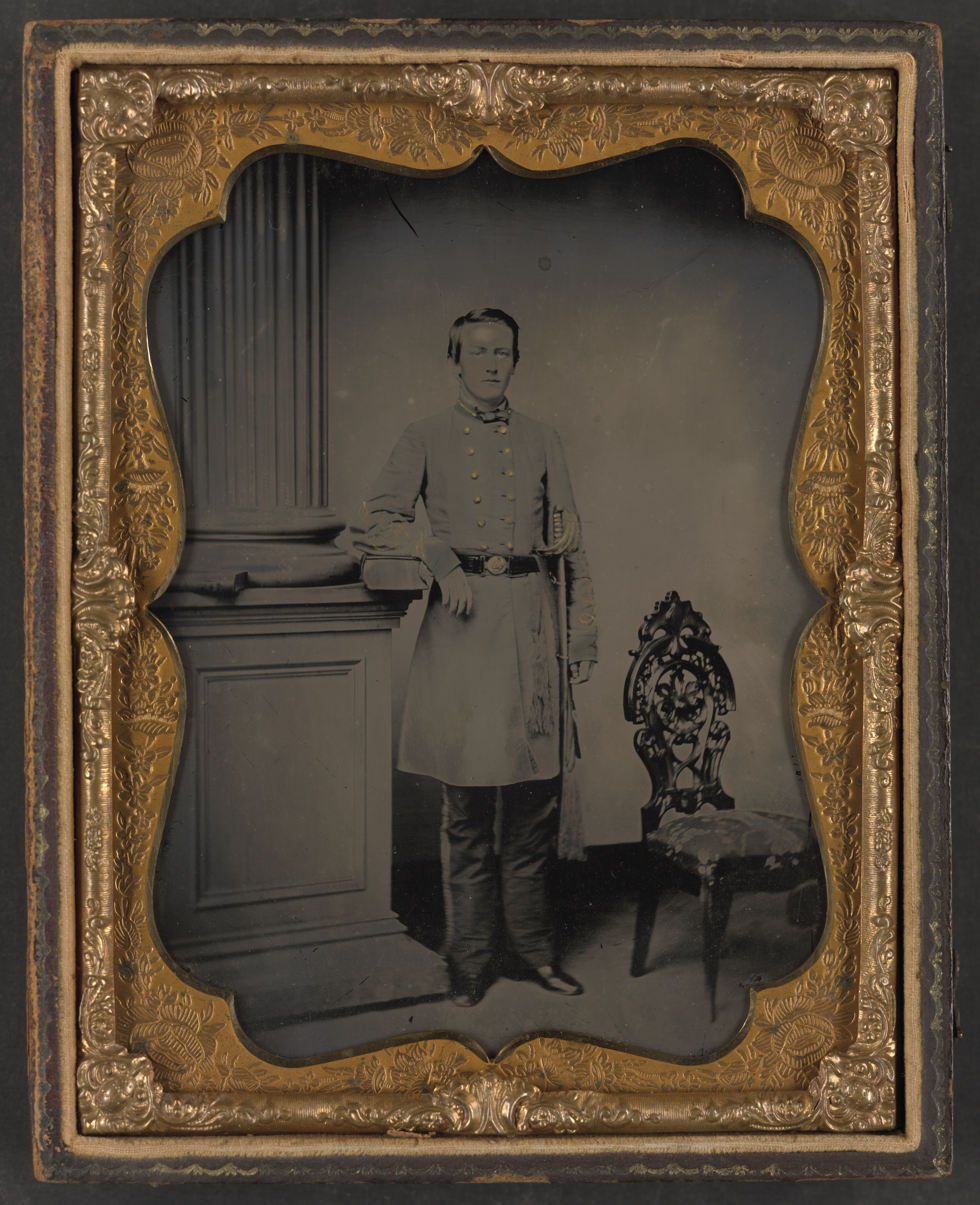
Captain William F. McRorie of Co. A, 4th North Carolina Infantry Regiment

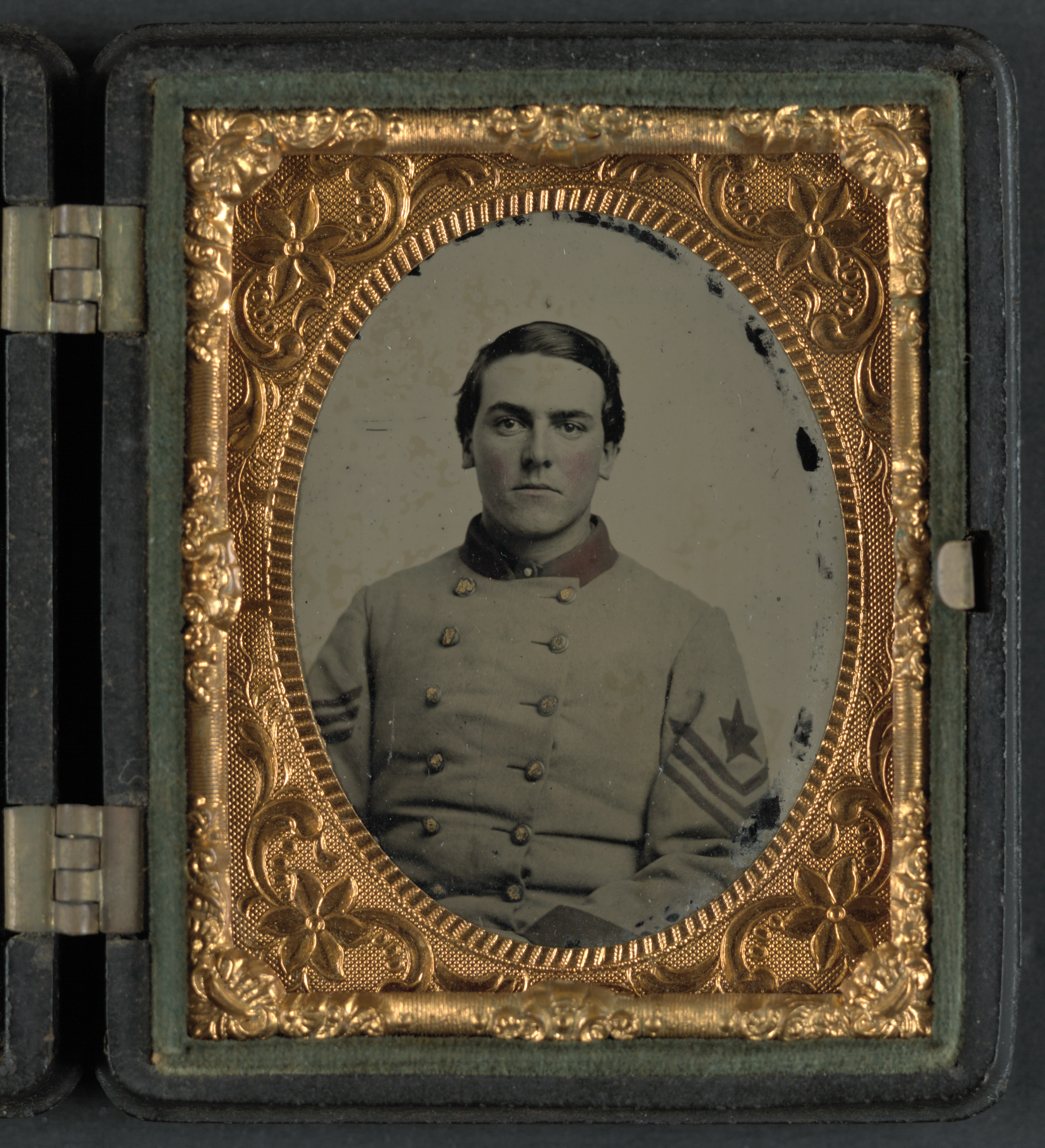
Lieutenant William Sharpe Barnes, F Company, 4th North Carolina Infantry

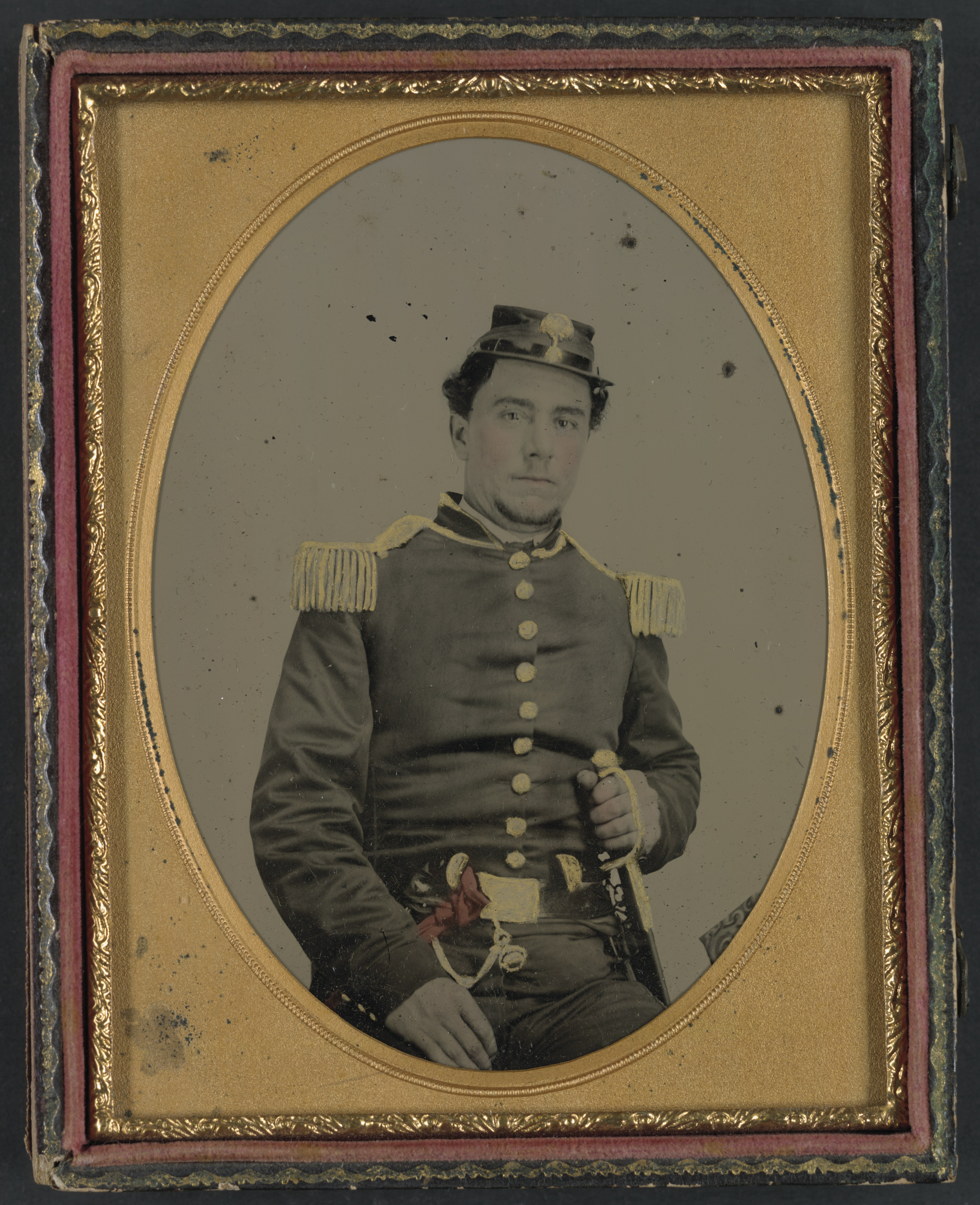
Jesse Sharpe Barnes, later captain of Co. F, 4th North Carolina Infantry

The 4th North Carolina Infantry Regiment was a Confederate States Army regiment during the American Civil War, active from 1861 until the war's end in April 1865. Ordered to Virginia, the unit served in General Winfield S. Featherston’s, George B. Anderson’s, Stephen D. Ramseur’s, and William R. Cox’s Brigade. Its field officers were Colonels George B. Anderson, Bryan Grimes, Edwin A. Osborne, and James H. Wood; Lieutenant Colonels David M. Carter and John A. Young; and Majors Edward S. Marsh and Absalom K. Simonton. It was nicknamed "The Bloody Fourth" after the high rate of casualties at the Battle of Seven Pines.

== History ==
The 4th North Carolina regiment was raised in 1861 from central and western North Carolina, with George B. Anderson as its first colonel. The regiment completed its organization in May 1862, at Camp Hill, near Garysburg, North Carolina. It recruited its members in Iredell, Rowan, Wayne, Beaufort, Wilson, and Davie counties.

At the Battle of Seven Pines the 4th North Carolina regiment justly earned its sobriquet of the “Bloody Fourth”. The regiment was here commanded by Lieutenant Colonel Bryan Grimes, who led the charge, and was the only officer surviving the fight unwounded. The Fourth went into battle with 520 men and 25 officers- “the noble 545.” In carrying the works it lost 462 men and 24 officers killed and wounded; this was the bloodiest charge of the war. In this battle the color guard being killed, the intrepid and heroic John Stikeleather became color bearer, and proudly bore the banner to its surrender at Appomattox.

Anderson was mortally wounded at the Bloody Lane during the Battle of Sharpsburg (Battle of Antietam) in 1862 and command of the unit passed to Lieutenant Colonel Bryan Grimes.

The 4th North Carolina marched northward in Maryland and later into Pennsylvania, going as far north as Carlisle Barracks, Pennsylvania. On July 1, 1863, the 4th North Carolina became engaged in the Battle of Gettysburg, fighting at Oak Hill Battle of Gettysburg, First Day. On the first day at Gettysburg, the regiment captured more Union prisoners than the regiment had men. “At Gettysburg he [Colonel Bryan Grimes] and his regiment were the first to enter the town, and they drove the enemy through Gettysburg to the heights beyond, capturing more prisoners than there were men in his command.”

The second day of Gettysburg was spent northwest of Cemetery Hill.

Later in the war, the regiment fought during the Overland Campaign and Siege of Petersburg, and remained in the Army of Northern Virginia until its surrender at Appomattox, Virginia. At Spotsylvania, the Fourth North Carolina again killed more Federal soldiers in their front than there were men in the regiment. “On May 12, 1864, the enemy captured the Confederate breast works at the Horseshoe at Spotsylvania Court House, also many guns and two thousand of General Edward Johnson’s men. The gallant General Stephen Dodson Ramseur being wounded in attempting to retake the breastworks, Colonel Bryan Grimes on his own responsibility, ordered a second charge, himself leading it, and recovered the entire works and all the guns, capturing many prisoners and killing more of the enemy than the brigade numbered men. General Lee himself rode down and thanked them, telling them they deserved the thanks of the country- they had saved the army.”

At Appomattox, William Ruffin Cox's Brigade fired the last shots from the Army of Northern Virginia.

== Operational record ==
Peninsular Campaign: Siege of Yorktown April 5- May 4, 1862; Battle of Williamsburg, May 5, 1862; Seven Pines May 31- June 1, 1862; Seven Days June 21- July 1, 1862: Mechanicsville, Beaver Dam Creek (Ellison's Mills) June 26, 1862; Gaines Mill, Cold Harbor, Chickahominy June 27, 1862; Glendale (Nelson's Farm), Frazier's Farm, Charles City Cross Roads, New Market Cross Roads, Willis Church, Va. June 30, 1862; Engagement, Malvern Hill, Va August 5, 1862; Maryland Campaign: Skirmish, Mouth of the Monocacy, Md. September 6, 1862; South Mountain (Fox's Gap) September 14, 1864; Antietam/Sharpsburg September 17, 1862; Retreat from Sharpsburg, September 19–20, 1862; Operations in Loudoun, Fauquier and Rappahannock Counties, Va October 26- November 10, 1862; Fredericksburg December 13, 1862; Chancellorsville Campaign April 27- May 6, 1863: Chancellorsville, Va May 1–3, 1863; Pennsylvania Campaign: Brandy Station, and Beverly Ford, Va June 9, 1863; Winchester Action, June 13, 1863; Berryville, VA; Skirmish at Martinsburg, VA (now WV) June 14, 1863; Battle of Winchester, Va June 15, 1863; Skirmish with Perry's Militia a few miles north of Carlisle, Pa June 29 (?), 1863; Gettysburg, Pa July 1–3, 1863; Skirmishes, Hagerstown, Md July 10–13, 1863; Bristoe Campaign October 9–22, 1863: Skirmish at Warrenton October 13, 1863; Operations Against the Advance of the Line of the Rappahannock November 7–8, 1863; Skirmish at Kelly's Ford, Va November 7, 1863; Mine Run November 27, 1863; Skirmish with sharpshooters, November 30, 1863; Morton's Ford December 3, 1863; Demonstrations of the Rapidan River February 6–7, 1864: Barnett's Ford, Va February 6–7, 1864; Wilderness Campaign May 4- June 12, 1864: Wilderness May 5–7, 1864; Spotsylvania Court House, Laurel Hill, Ny River, Fredericksburg Road May 8–21, 1864; Assault on the Salient, Spotsylvania Court House May 12, 1864; North Anna River, Va May 22–26, 1864; Jericho Bridge, Va May 25, 1864; Pamunkey River, Va May 26, 1864; Totopotomoy River, Va May 28–31, 1864; Bethesda Church, Va May 31- June 1, 1864; Cold Harbor June 1–12, 1864; Ream's Station, Va June 22, 1864; 1864 Shenandoah Valley Campaign: Monocacy July 9, 1864; Skirmish at Fort Stevens, DC July 11–12, 1864; Snicker's Gap (Parker's Ford) July 18, 1864; Kernstown, Va July 24, 1864; Winchester, Va August 17, 1864; Skirmish near Charlestown, WV August 21–22, 1864; Berryville, Va September 4, 1864; Abraham's Creek, Va September 13, 1864; Skirmish near Berryville, Va September 14, 1864; Sevier's Ford, Opequan Creek, Va September 15, 1864; Third Winchester September 19, 1864; Fisher's Hill September 22, 1864; Port Republic, Va September 26–28, 1864; Cedar Creek October 19, 1864; Rude's Hill, near Mount Jackson, Va November 23, 1864; Removal to Richmond and Petersburg, December 1864; Petersburg Campaign: Dabney's Mills, Rowanty Creek, Va February 5–7, 1865; Fort Stedman March 25, 1865; Fort Mahone April 2, 1865; The Retreat: Rennes Salient, April 5, 1865; Sayler's Creek April 6, 1865; Farmville/High Bridge April 7, 1865; Assault at Appomattox Court House April 9, 1865; Surrender at Appomattox Court House April 9, 1865.

== See also ==
- List of North Carolina Confederate Civil War units

== Bibliography ==
- Battle, Mrs. Jesse Mercer (née Laura Elizabeth Lee). Forget-Me-Nots of the Civil War: A Romance, Containing Reminiscences and Original Letters of Two Confederate Soldiers. Laura Elizabeth Lee. St. Louis, Missouri: Fleming Printing Co. 1909. Excellent series of letters from George and Walter Lee, two brothers of Company F, 4th NC. A reenactors’ dream filled with information about clothing, supplies, and life in the camps. Abstract: Describes family life in Clayton, N.C., beginning with the years leading up to the Civil War. Her father was an abolitionist but her two half-brothers were secessionists and joined Company F of the Fourth North Carolina Regiment. Their letters (p. 41-134) describe details of military life and battles until their deaths, one in battle and the other from exposure.
- Birdsong, James Cook, 1843- ? Brief Sketches of the North Carolina State Troops in the War Between the States, includes the First, Second, Third, Fourth... Collected and Compiled by James C. Birdsong, State Librarian, under a Resolution Ratified March 6, 1893.. Raleigh, NC: Josephus Daniels, State Printer and Binder. 1894. 213 pages. Now available on microfilm from Yale University Library, 1986.
- Chambers, Henry Alexander. Diary of Captain Henry A. Chambers. edited by T. H. Pearce. Wendell, North Carolina: Broadfoot's Bookmark. 290 pages. 1983. Captain Chambers was a native of Statesville, and rose to the rank of sergeant in the Fourth Regiment. In 1863 he transferred to another regiment then forming (49th NCST), and was promoted to captain.
- The Confederate Reveille. United Daughters of the Confederacy. Edited by Mary Grimes Smith. Washington, NC: Pamlico Chapter of the Daughters of the Confederacy. May 10, 1898; Reprinted by the North Carolina Confederate Centennial Commission, 1964. Subtitled: ”The History of Beaufort County and Beaufort County Men during the Civil War.”
- Ernie and Jill Couch. North Carolina Trivia. Nashville, TN: Rutledge Hill Press. 1986.
- Cox, William R. “The Anderson-Ramseur-Cox Brigade.” IN: Walter Clark. “Histories of the Several Regiments and Battalions...” Goldsboro, NC: Nash Brothers. 1901. Volume IV, pages 441-464.
- “A Series of the Gaither Brothers Civil War Letters.” Published in the Statesville Record and Landmark. A series of letters from the Gaither Brothers, published February 22, page 12; March 3, page 9; March 8, page 13; March 15, page 5; March 29, page 2; and April 5, 1961, page 14. Selected and edited by Homer Keever. The Gaither brothers, Burgess E., Thomas W. and Willian Greenberry, were all privates in Company H, and were from Iredell County.
- Gallagher, Gary W., Stephen Dodson Ramseur: Lee's Gallant General, The University of North Carolina Press, 1985, ISBN 0-8078-4522-1.
- Grimes, Bryan. Extracts of Letters of Major General Bryan Grimes to his Wife; Written While in Active Service in the Army of Northern Virginia, together with some Personal Recollections of the War, Written by Him after its Close, etc.; Compiled from Original Manuscripts by Pulaski Cowper. Edwards Broughton and Co.: Raleigh, North Carolina. 137 pages. 1883. Reprinted several times.
- London, Henry Armand. 1912. "Major-General Grimes." Carolina and the Southern Cross. Volume I (1), page 13. Published by the Children's Auxiliary of the United Daughters of the Confederacy in Kinston, NC.
- London, Henry Armand (1846-1918). Memorial Address on the Life and Services of General Bryan Grimes, Delivered on Memorial Day, May 10, 1886, at Raleigh, North Carolina. Raleigh, North Carolina: E. M. Uzzle Co. 22 pages. Reprinted 1983 as part of the “Pamphlets in American History: Civil War” series. Also reprinted in: Peele, William Joseph. Lives of Distinguished North Carolinians with Illustrations and Speeches, Collected and Compiled by W. J. Peele. Raleigh, North Carolina: North Carolina Pub. Society. 605 pages. 1898. Henry A. London was General Grimes’ courier or messenger during the war.
