= William L. Saunders =

American politician

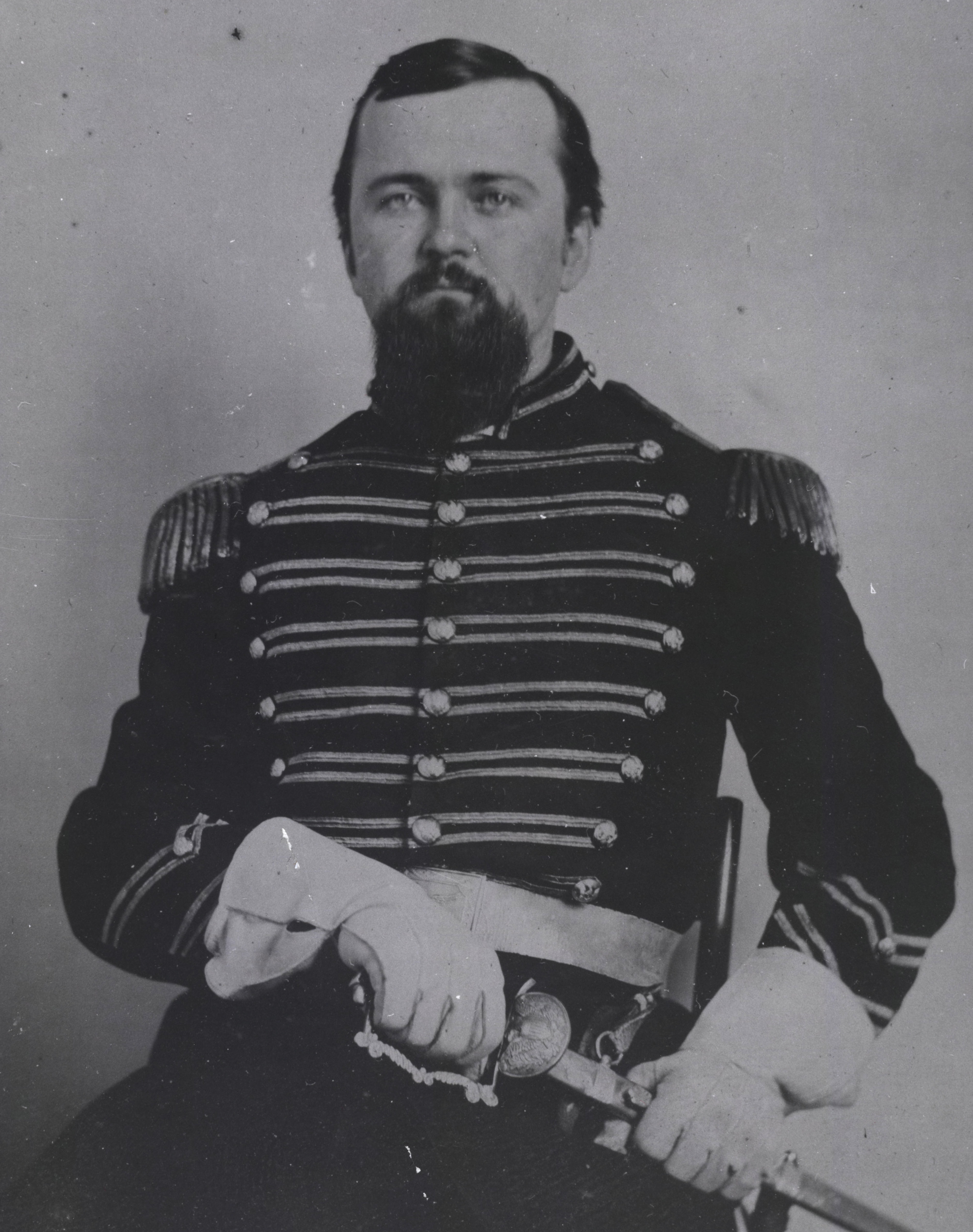

11th Secretary of State of North Carolina
- In office 1879–1891
- Governor: Thomas Jordan Jarvis; Alfred Moore Scales
- Preceded by: Joseph A. Engelhard
- Succeeded by: Octavius Coke

Personal details
- Born: July 30, 1835 Raleigh, North Carolina
- Died: April 2, 1891 (aged 55) Raleigh, North Carolina
- Party: Democratic
- Spouse: Florida Cotten (m. 1864)
- Parent(s): Joseph Hubbard Saunders; Laura J. Baker Saunders
- Education: University of North Carolina
- Profession: Lawyer, Politician

Military service
- Allegiance: Confederate States of America
- Branch/service: Confederate States Army
- Rank: Colonel
- Commands: 46th North Carolina Infantry
- Battles/wars: American Civil War

William Laurence Saunders (July 30, 1835 – April 2, 1891) was an American attorney, newspaper editor, historian, Ku Klux Klan chief organizer in North Carolina, and the North Carolina Secretary of State from 1879 until his death in 1891.

== Biography ==
Saunders served as a colonel in the Confederate States Army during the American Civil War; commanding the 46th North Carolina Infantry Regiment. He was wounded at the Battle of Fredericksburg and the Battle of the Wilderness. Saunders served as chief clerk of the North Carolina Senate for several years. In 1879, he was appointed Secretary of State by Gov. Thomas Jordan Jarvis to replace his brother-in-law, Joseph A. Engelhard, who had died in office. Saunders then won election to the office in 1880, 1884 and 1888. During his tenure he oversaw the publication of a collection of the state's colonial records.

He was a member and secretary-treasurer of the Board of Trustees of his alma mater, the University of North Carolina at Chapel Hill.

Carolina Hall at the University of North Carolina at Chapel Hill was formerly named Saunders Hall, to honor Saunders as a Confederate veteran, UNC-Chapel Hill Trustee, and leader of the North Carolina Ku Klux Klan In the late 20th and early 21st centuries, there were calls from UNC students to remove his name from the building because of his leadership in the Klan. In 2015, the building was renamed "Carolina Hall".

He is buried in the graveyard at Calvary Episcopal Church, Tarboro, North Carolina.

Party political offices
Preceded by Joseph Adolphus Engelhard	Democratic nominee for North Carolina Secretary of State; 1880, 1884, 1888	Succeeded by Octavius Coke
Political offices
Preceded by Joseph A. Engelhard	Secretary of State of North Carolina; 1879–1891	Succeeded by Octavius Coke
