= Charles M. Cooke =

American politician

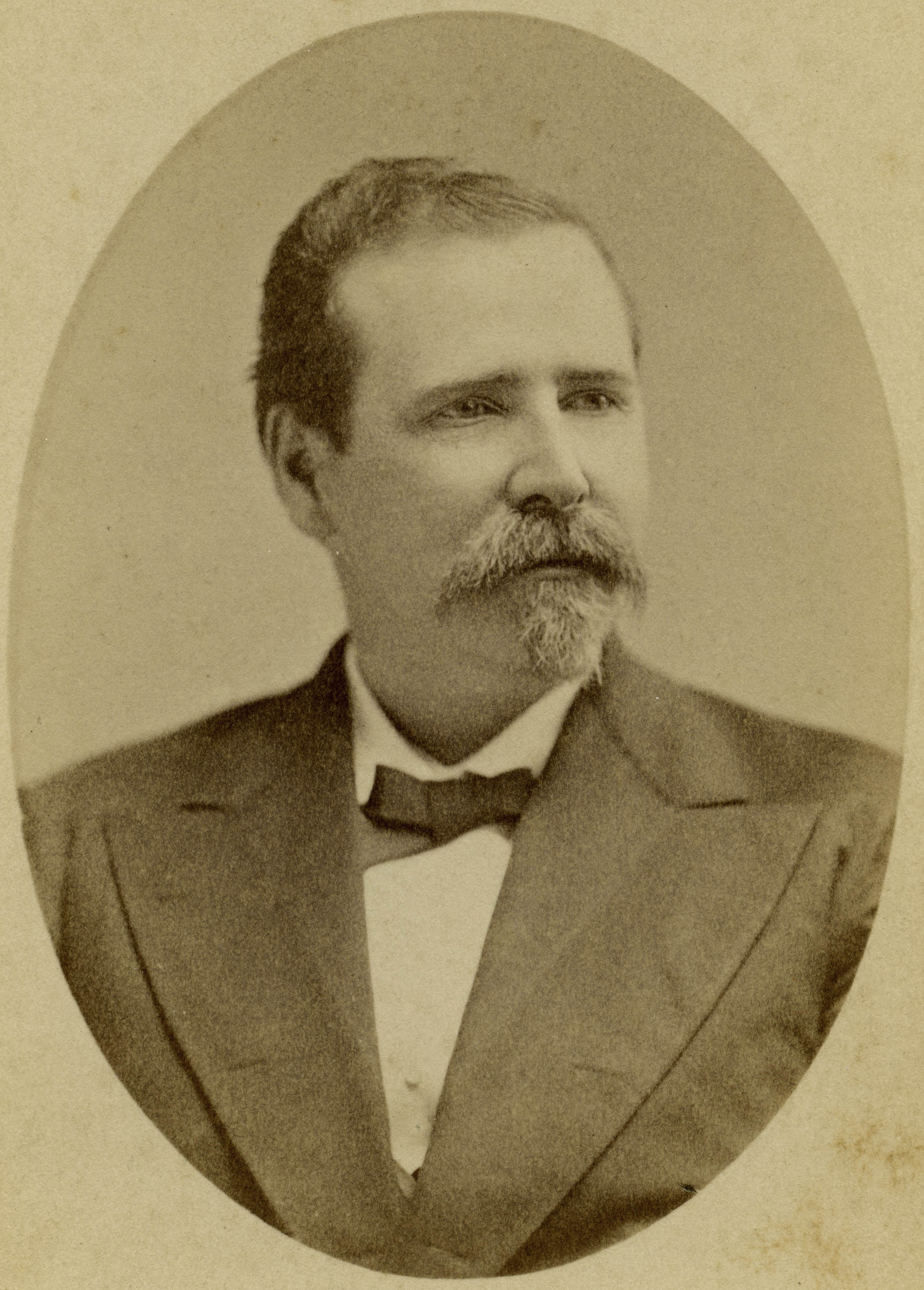
- Cooke c. 1879

Secretary of State of North Carolina
- In office 1895–1897
- Governor: Elias Carr
- Preceded by: Octavius Coke
- Succeeded by: Cyrus Thompson

Charles Mather Cooke (10 March 1844 – 16 January 1920) was a North Carolina politician who served as Speaker of the North Carolina House of Representatives (1881) and as North Carolina Secretary of State (1895–1897).

Cooke studied at Wake Forest College but did not graduate, and served in the 55th North Carolina Regiment during the American Civil War. After the war, he entered into the practice of law in Louisburg, North Carolina, at first in partnership with future congressman and N.C. Supreme Court justice Joseph J. Davis. Cooke, a Democrat, represented Franklin County in both houses of the state legislature at various times in the 1870s and 1880s. From 1877 to 1878, he was solicitor (prosecuting attorney) for the Sixth District. He was elected Speaker of the House on January 5, 1881.

Cooke made an unsuccessful run for Congress in 1894, losing to William F. Strowd. He was appointed to the office of Secretary of State by Gov. Elias Carr in 1895 upon the death of Octavius Coke. He was defeated for election to a full term in 1896 by Populist Cyrus Thompson. In 1902, Cooke was elected as a state superior court judge, serving from 1903 until 1915.

His childhood home, Cooke House near Louisburg, North Carolina, was listed on the National Register of Historic Places in 1975.

== Works cited ==
- Justesen, Benjamin R. (2012). George Henry White: An Even Chance in the Race of Life (reprint ed.). Baton Rouge: Louisiana State University Press. ISBN 9780807144770.

Party political offices
Preceded by Octavius Coke	Democratic nominee for North Carolina Secretary of State; 1896	Succeeded by John Bryan Grimes
Political offices
Preceded by Octavius Coke	Secretary of State of North Carolina; 1895–1897	Succeeded by Cyrus Thompson
