= Janice Faulkner =

American academic and politician (died 2019)

Janice H. Faulkner

22nd Secretary of State of North Carolina
- In office April 1996 – January 1997
- Governor: Jim Hunt
- Preceded by: Rufus Edmisten
- Succeeded by: Elaine Marshall

Personal details
- Born: January 8, 1932 Jamesville, North Carolina, U.S.
- Died: October 8, 2019 (aged 87) Greenville, North Carolina, U.S.
- Party: Democratic
- Education: East Carolina University

Janice Hardison Faulkner (January 8, 1932 – October 8, 2019) was an American university professor and politician who served as North Carolina Secretary of State from April 1996 to January 1997. She was the first woman to serve on the North Carolina Council of State.

== Early life ==
Janice Hardison was born on January 8, 1932 in Jamesville, North Carolina, United States. She graduated from her high school as valedictorian and subsequently enrolled at East Carolina College. While there she edited the student newspaper, Tech Echo. She graduated in 1953 with a bachelor of science in English and subsequently worked as a school teacher while attending graduate school before earning her masters in English in 1956. She married Walter Faulkner but later divorced him.

== Career ==
=== Academia ===
Faulkner became a member of the English faculty at East Carolina College (later East Carolina University) in 1957. In this capacity she taught English classes, she served as a director of alumni affairs, chaired the board of the ECU Credit Union, directed the Regional Development Institute, and served as associate vice chancellor for regional development. She published two English textbooks and articles on folklore, history, historic preservation, and economic development. She worked at the university until 1993.

=== Politics ===
Faulkner attributed her interest in politics to events in her childhood, particularly her father's friendship with politician Herbert Covington Bonner. She worked for Terry Sanford's gubernatorial campaign in 1960 and in 1971 she arranged for U.S. Senator George McGovern to visit East Carolina University. In 1981, Faulkner was made executive director of the North Carolina Democratic Party, becoming the first woman to hold the position. She took a leave of absence from the university to work in the office.

In 1993 North Carolina Governor Jim Hunt appointed Faulkner as North Carolina Secretary of Revenue. She and his other cabinet appointees were sworn in on January 11. While there she oversaw the introduction of a computer system intended to increase tax revenue, and North Carolina subsequently became the state with the largest portion of tax returns filed electronically. Three years later North Carolina Secretary of State Rufus L. Edmisten resigned from office, and in April 1996 Hunt appointed Faulkner to fill in the vacancy. In this capacity she was the first woman to serve on the North Carolina Council of State. She held the office until January 1997 when she was succeeded by Elaine Marshall.

On January 22, 1997, Hunt appointed Faulkner to serve as Commissioner of the Division of Motor Vehicles (DMV). A week after taking office she implemented a new policy with standardized penalties regarding inspection stations' failure to conduct accurate emissions tests and ordered the DMV Enforcement Section to conduct undercover investigations to ensure such tests were being conducted properly. In 1998 she rejected a request by the Sons of Confederate Veterans to authorize the creation of a license plate featuring its logo, including a Confederate battle flag. Faulkner argued that the group was not a civic organization—and thus entitled to the request—as defined by law because its membership was limited to male descendants of Confederate soldiers. A court later reversed the decision. Faulkner successfully lobbied the North Carolina General Assembly to raise the wages for 400 DMV employees. As a sign of appreciation, several of her subordinates proposed purchasing her a gift. Faulkner deemed this unethical, but agreed to have DMV officials solicit voluntary donations from DMV employees to charity in her name, including donations to her church. Secretary of Transportation Norris Tolson ordered the money to be returned to the employees and requested the North Carolina Board of Ethics to investigate the scheme's propriety. The board concluded that no laws or executive orders were violated but voted to send her a "letter of caution". She retired in 2001.

== Later life ==
In the last two years of her life, Faulkner suffered from health problems. She died on October 8, 2019, at a retirement community in Greenville, North Carolina, at the age of 87.
