= Grimesland Plantation =

Historic house in North Carolina, United States

- U.S. National Register of Historic Places
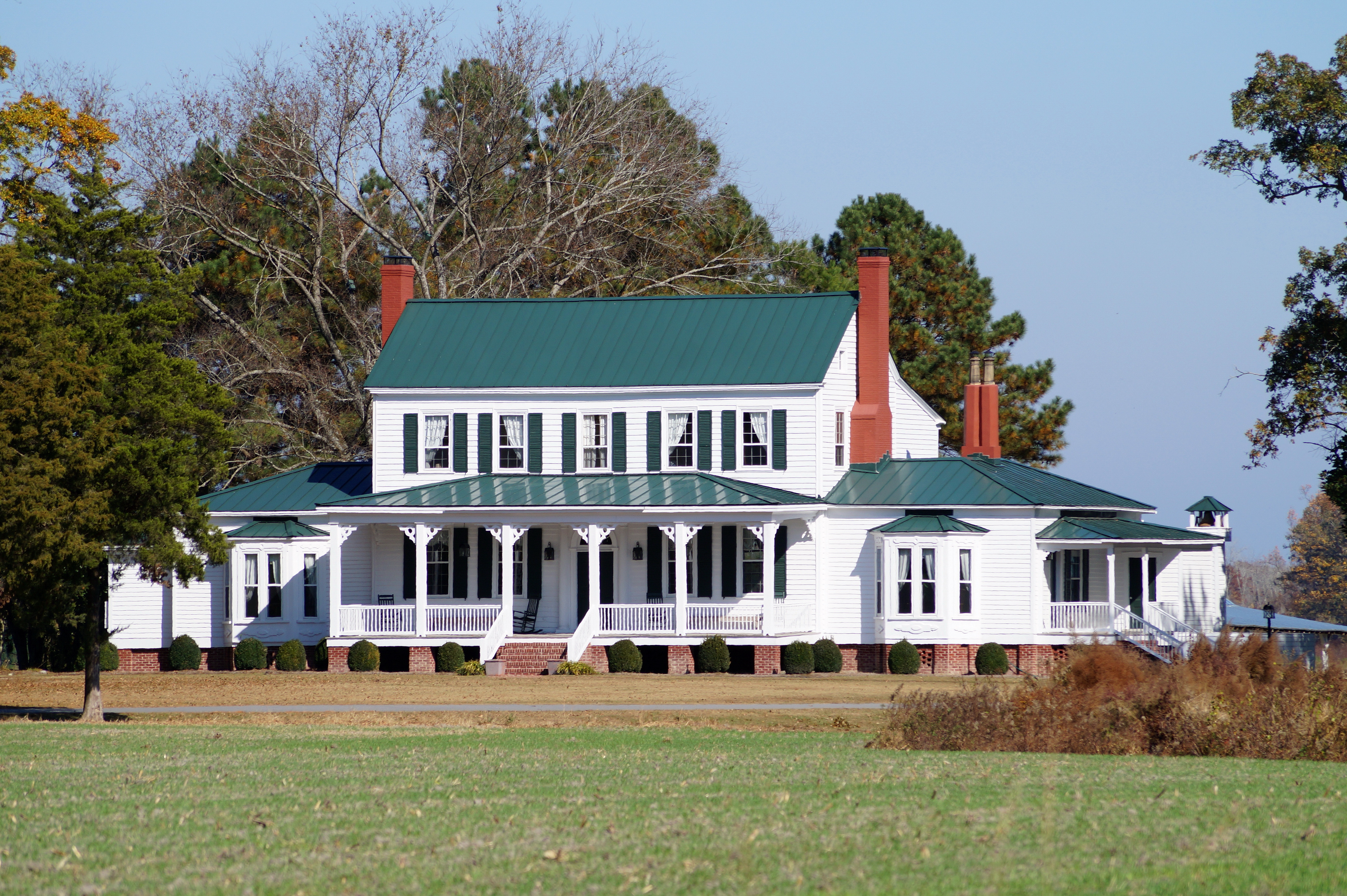
- Grimesland Plantation, November 2014

- Location within North Carolina Location within the United States
- Location: East of Grimesland on SR 1569, near Grimesland, North Carolina
- Coordinates: 35°33′22″N 77°10′02″W
- Area: 15 acres (6.1 ha)
- Built: c. 1790
- Built by: Grimes, William
- NRHP reference No.: 71000616
- Added to NRHP: March 31, 1971

Grimesland Plantation is a historic plantation house located near Grimesland, Pitt County, North Carolina. It was built about 1790, and is a two-story, frame dwelling sheathed in weatherboard and with flanking exterior gable end brick chimneys. It has flanking one-story, hip-roofed wings in the Greek Revival style, a two-story rear addition, and one-story front verandah. Also on the property are a row of frame slave quarters and a stone smokehouse. It was the home of Confederate army general officer Bryan Grimes (1828-1880) and 57 enslaved people who worked the farm.

It was added to the National Register of Historic Places in 1971.
