= Henry J. Menninger =

American pharmacist and politician

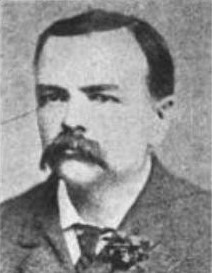

8th Secretary of State of North Carolina
- In office 1868–1873
- Governor: William Woods Holden; Tod Robinson Caldwell
- Preceded by: Robert W. Best
- Succeeded by: William H. Howerton

Personal details
- Born: 1838 near Metz, Kingdom of France
- Died: September 8, 1889 (aged 50–51) New York, U.S.
- Party: Republican

Henry J. Menninger (1838 – 8 September 1889) was a German-American medical doctor, pharmacist, politician, newspaper editor, and merchant. During the American Civil War, he served in the Union Army as a surgeon. He was the North Carolina Secretary of State from 1868 to 1873 and was a city official and prominent pharmacist in Brooklyn, New York in the 1880s.

== Early life and education ==
Henry J. Menninger was born in 1838 near Metz to Dr. John Menninger, one of the German Forty-Eighters. John Menninger was a Radical member of the 1849 Frankfurt Parliament. The Menningers fled Germany along with Franz Sigel after the failure of that political body, emigrating to New York. Henry Menninger attended the public school system in New York and paid his way through medical school at New York University by first working in and then opening a drug store in New York. He graduated medical school in 1861 in time to serve in the American Civil War.

== American Civil War ==
Shortly after receiving his medical degree, Menninger enlisted in the Union Army as a private to fight in the American Civil War. Upon his unit's arrival in Washington D.C., he was promoted to the rank of first lieutenant. In that capacity he led a company during the First Battle of Bull Run. He was later injured at Roach's Mill. He then transferred to the medical corps and served with the 2nd North Carolina Infantry Regiment, and later as a post surgeon at New Bern, North Carolina after being injured. He served through early 1865, when his commission ended. He chose to stay in occupied New Bern and opened a drug store.

== Post-bellum career ==
During and after Reconstruction, Menninger was active in the Republican Party, co-founding the New Bern Republican newspaper in 1867. He served as one of the two secretaries of the Republican Party's first North Carolina state convention that year. During 1865, he served as the chief surgeon for the Freedmen's Bureau of North Carolina in New Bern, and from 1865 to 1868 he was surgeon for the United States Marine Hospital at New Bern. He was elected to New Bern's town council in 1866 and served until its members were removed by federal officials in May 1867.

In 1868, he moved to Raleigh, North Carolina and was elected Secretary of State of North Carolina, serving until 1873. He focused much of his attention on immigration to North Carolina during his administration, as well as agriculture. Unusually large state expenditures on printing paper and sales of it for private use led Menninger to be accused of committing fraud. He declined to seek reelection. After his term ended, he operated a drug store in Raleigh until leaving the state. In 1874, he moved to the Fourth Ward of Brooklyn, New York City, where he continued to operate a drug store. In 1881, he was elected a Republican alderman, and elected coroner in 1883 serving until 1886 when he was defeated by a Democratic opponent. He was an active member of Mallory Post of the Grand Army of the Republic, a vice-president of the New York College of Pharmacy, and a director of the Germania Savings Bank. He was an active member of the American Pharmaceutical Association for several decades, and served as its first vice president.

== See also ==
- Franz Sigel
- Forty-Eighters
- List of North Carolina Union Civil War units

== Works cited ==
- Cheney, John L. Jr., ed. (1981). North Carolina Government, 1585-1979 : A Narrative and Statistical History (revised ed.). Raleigh: North Carolina Secretary of State. OCLC 1290270510.
- Raper, Horace W. (1985). William W. Holden: North Carolina's Political Enigma. Chapel Hill: University of North Carolina Press. ISBN 0807850608.
- Watson, Alan D. (1987). A History of New Bern and Craven County. New Bern: Tryon Palace Commission. OCLC 17398679.

Party political offices
| First | Republican nominee for North Carolina Secretary of State; 1868 | Succeeded by William H. Howerton |
