= Cyrus Thompson =

American politician

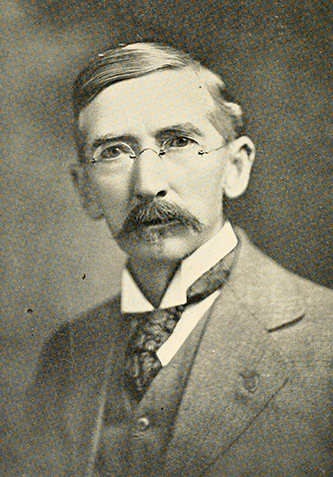
- Thompson, 1919

14th Secretary of State of North Carolina
- In office 1897–1901
- Governor: Daniel L. Russell
- Preceded by: Charles M. Cooke
- Succeeded by: John Bryan Grimes

Personal details
- Born: February 8, 1855 Richlands, North Carolina, U.S.
- Died: November 20, 1930 (aged 75)
- Party: Populist
- Other political affiliations: Democratic
- Spouse: Florence Garland Kent (m. 1882)
- Children: 10
- Education: University of Virginia School of Medicine; Tulane University School of Medicine

Cyrus Thompson (February 8, 1855 – November 20, 1930) was a politician and leader of the Populist Party in North Carolina. He served as North Carolina Secretary of State for one term, from 1897 to 1901.

== Life ==
Thompson studied medicine at the University of Virginia Medical School and Tulane University School of Medicine where he received a degree in 1878. Thompson, a medical doctor and farmer, represented Onslow County in the North Carolina House of Representatives in 1883, and in the North Carolina Senate in 1885. Both times, he was elected as a Democrat. Thompson became a leader in the Farmers Alliance and bolted from the Democrats to become a Populist.

== Personal life ==
He married his wife, Florence Garland Kent, in 1882. They had ten children.

== Sources ==
- North Carolina Election of 1898
- North Carolina Manual of 1913
- North Carolina Historical Marker

Party political offices
Preceded by Rufus Amis	Republican nominee for North Carolina Secretary of State; 1896, 1900	Succeeded by Joseph J. Jenkins
First	Populist nominee for North Carolina Secretary of State; 1896, 1900	Succeeded by none
Preceded by Joseph J. Jenkins	Republican nominee for North Carolina Secretary of State; 1908	Succeeded by William J. Andrews
Preceded by Charles M. Cooke	North Carolina Secretary of State; 1897–1901	Succeeded by John Bryan Grimes
