= Elaine Marshall =

American politician (born 1945)

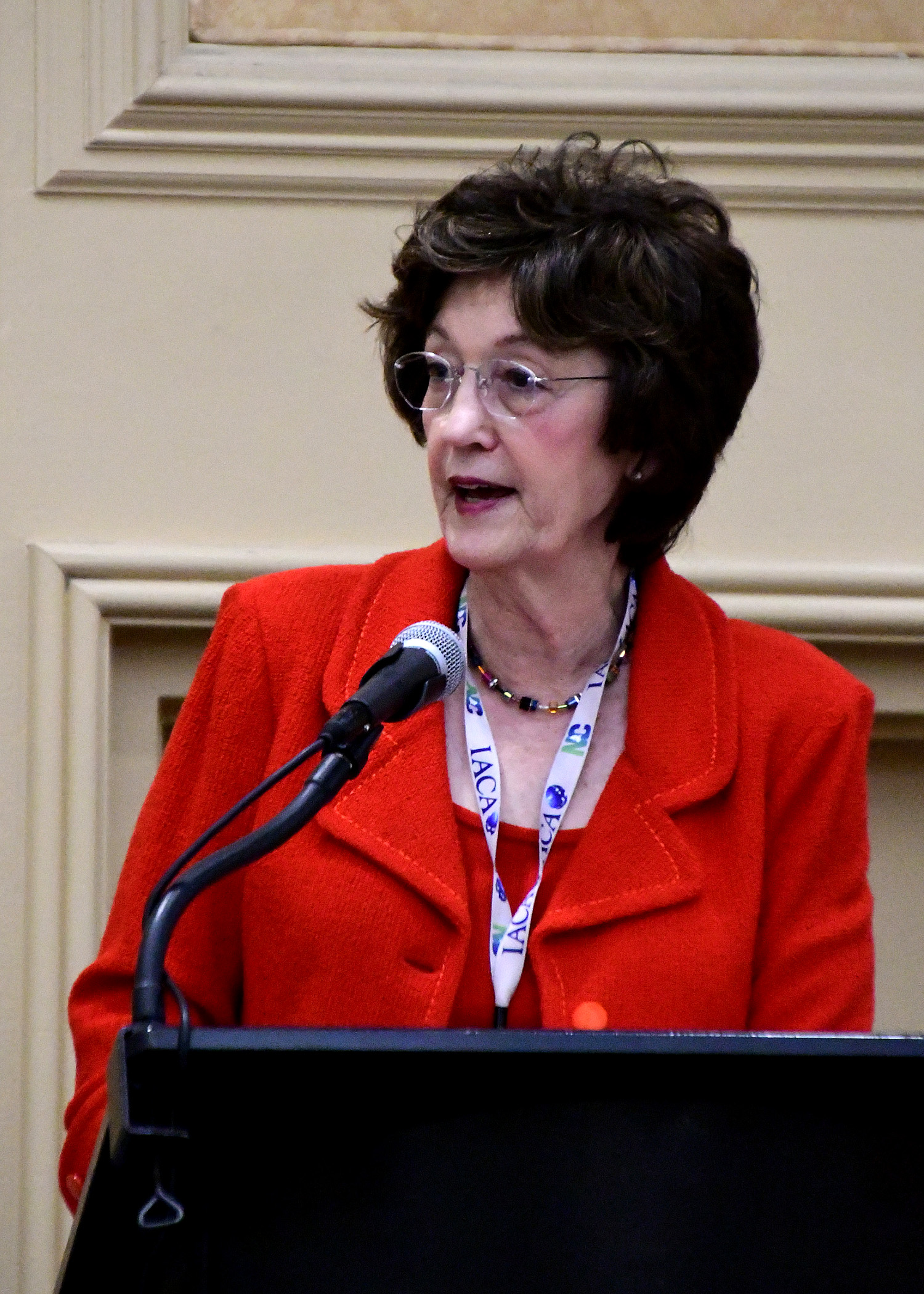
- Marshall in 2018

23rd Secretary of State of North Carolina
- Incumbent
- Assumed office January 3, 1997
- Governor: Jim Hunt; Mike Easley; Bev Perdue; Pat McCrory; Roy Cooper; Josh Stein
- Preceded by: Janice Faulkner

Member of the North Carolina Senate from the 15th district
- In office January 1, 1993 – January 1, 1995
- Preceded by: Leo Daughtry
- Succeeded by: Daniel Page

Personal details
- Born: November 18, 1945 (age 80) Lineboro, Maryland, U.S.
- Party: Democratic
- Education: University of Maryland, College Park (BS); Campbell University (JD)
- Website: Campaign website

Elaine Folk Marshall (born November 18, 1945) is an American attorney and politician who has served as the North Carolina Secretary of State since 1997. A member of the Democratic Party, she is the first woman to be elected to statewide office in North Carolina. Marshall was also the unsuccessful Democratic nominee for the United States Senate seat then held by Republican Richard Burr in the 2010 election. In 2020, Marshall was re-elected to a seventh term as North Carolina Secretary of State. In 2024, she was reelected to an eighth term winning with 51 percent of the vote.

== Early life, education, and career ==
Marshall was born on November 18, 1945, in Lineboro, Maryland. Her father was a farmer who, for many years, served as a volunteer fire fighter and community leader, and her mother was the organist in the family's small rural church for more than 60 years. She attended public schools as a child and became the first person in her family to graduate college. She studied textiles at the University of Maryland from 1964 to 1968, earning a Bachelor of Science degree in Textiles and Clothing. While at Maryland, she became a member of Alpha Gamma Delta. During her undergraduate years, she spent her summers working as a camping director for the Maryland 4-H Foundation, an organization she has continued to support.

After graduation, Marshall taught in the public schools of Lenoir County, North Carolina, and then ran a book and gift store. She later returned to the field of education as an instructor at Lenoir Community College and Johnston Technical Community College.

Marshall returned to school to study law at the Norman Adrian Wiggins School of Law at Campbell University and earned her Juris Doctor degree in 1981. She has been admitted to practice in North Carolina, the U.S. District courts in the Eastern and Middle Districts of North Carolina, the U.S. Fourth Circuit Court of Appeals, and the United States Supreme Court. She is a member of the NC State Bar, the NC Bar Association, the NC Association of Women Attorneys, and the Delta Theta Phi legal fraternity. She also holds multiple honorary degrees from Campbell University, Meredith College, Lees–McRae College and Testemitanu State University. She was a partner in Lillington, North Carolina law firms Bain & Marshall (1985–1992) and Marshall & Marshall (1993–1997).

== Political career ==
From the early 1970s, she was active in the Young Democrats organization and eventually became National Secretary of the Young Democrats of America. In Harnett County, where she practiced law, Marshall served in 1983–1987 as President of Democratic Women and in 1991–1992 served as chair of the Harnett County Democratic Party.

=== State senator ===
Marshall was first elected to public office in 1992 as a member of the North Carolina Senate representing the 15th Senate District, serving from 1993 to 1995.

=== Secretary of State ===
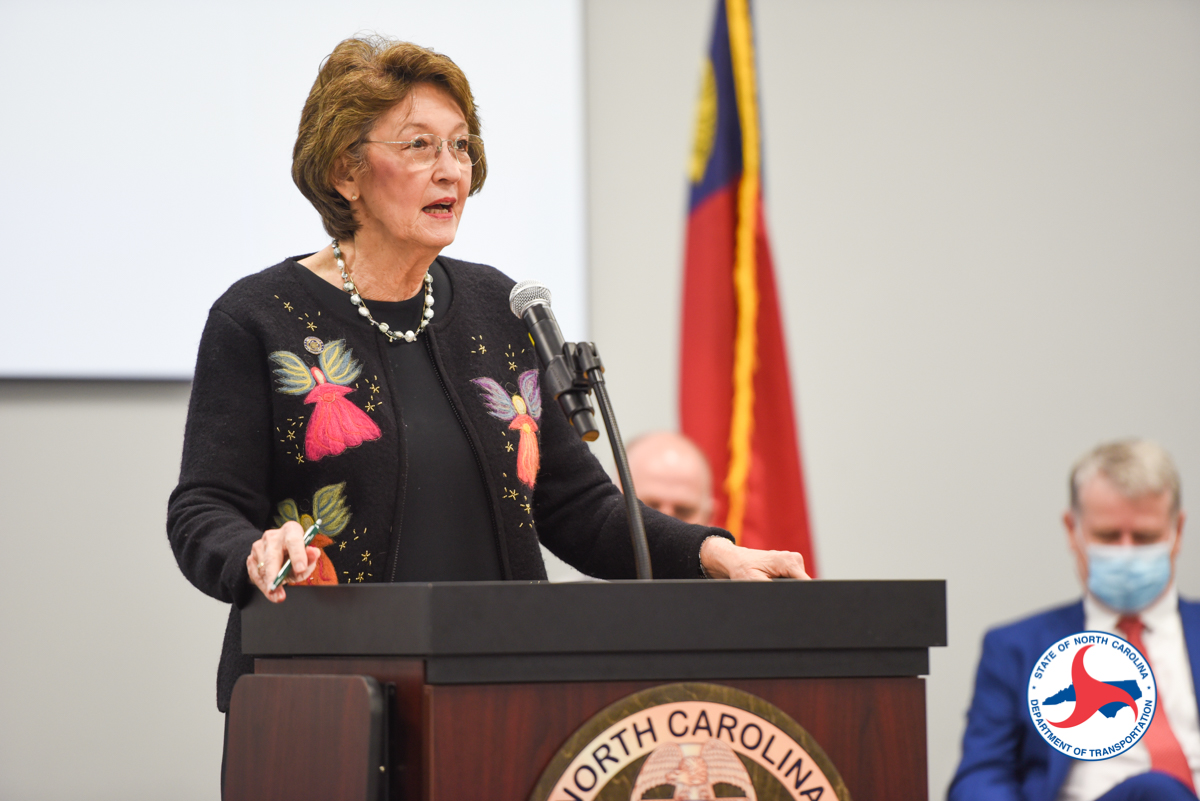
Marshall in 2021

In 1996, she ran for the post of North Carolina Secretary of State against Republican challenger and former stock car racer Richard Petty. She won the election by a margin of 53% to 45%, becoming the first woman elected to a statewide executive office in North Carolina history. Marshall has won re-election six times and in 2008 received the second highest vote total of any candidate in the state. Elaine Marshall is only the third elected Secretary of State of North Carolina since 1936, as office-holders have commonly been re-elected many times. Marshall has been credited with bringing the office into the technological age by introducing e-commerce and providing online registration for lobbyists and businesses. Marshall's work has been recognized by the U.S. Chamber of Commerce, the National Notary Association and Campbell University. In 2007, Marshall served as president of the National Electronic Commerce Coordinating Council, "an organization of public and private sector leaders aimed at identifying best technology practices that make government agencies more efficient and modernize their services".

=== U.S. Senate campaigns ===
==== 2002 ====
In 2002, Marshall ran for United States Senate in the race to replace retiring Sen. Jesse Helms. However, she was defeated in the Democratic primary by Erskine Bowles, who served as White House Chief of Staff under President Bill Clinton.

==== 2010 ====
In 2009, Marshall decided to enter the 2010 Senate race against incumbent Republican Richard Burr. She faced Cal Cunningham, Ken Lewis, and other lesser-known candidates in the May 2010 primary, and won the endorsement of The Charlotte Observer. After failing to garner above 40% of the vote in the May 4 primary election, Marshall had to face Cunningham in a runoff in June.

On June 22, 2010, Marshall defeated Cunningham (with approximately 60 percent of the vote) to secure the Democratic nomination. For the general election, she was again endorsed by The Charlotte Observer, the state's largest newspaper. On election day Marshall lost to incumbent Richard Burr, who had received 55% of the vote.

== Personal life ==
Marshall has five stepchildren and seven grandchildren. She is Methodist.

Marshall married attorney Bill Holdford in 2001. Holdford had two daughters from a previous relationship. He died in 2009 from cancer. Marshall married J. Thomas "Tommy" Bunn in 2017; they remained married until his death in 2023.

== Electoral history ==
North Carolina Secretary of State Election, 1996
| Party | Candidate | Votes | % |
| Democratic | Elaine Marshall | 1,333,994 | 53.48 |
| Republican | Richard Petty | 1,126,701 | 45.17 |
| Libertarian | Lewis Guignard | 20,734 | 0.83 |
| Natural Law | Stephen Richter | 12,896 | 0.52 |

North Carolina Secretary of State Election, 2000
| Party | Candidate | Votes | % |
| Democratic | Elaine Marshall (inc.) | 1,512,076 | 54.44 |
| Republican | Harris Durham Blake | 1,265,654 | 45.56 |

North Carolina U.S. Senate Democratic Primary Election, 2002
| Party | Candidate | Votes | % |
| Democratic | Erskine Bowles | 277,329 | 43.40 |
| Democratic | Dan Blue | 184,216 | 28.83 |
| Democratic | Elaine Marshall | 97,392 | 15.24 |
| Democratic | Cynthia Brown | 27,799 | 4.35 |
| Democratic | Albert Lee Wiley Jr. | 12,725 | 1.99 |
| Democratic | Bob Ayers | 12,326 | 1.93 |
| Democratic | David Tidwell | 10,510 | 1.64 |
| Democratic | Duke Underwood | 9,940 | 1.56 |
| Democratic | Randy Crow | 6,788 | 1.06 |

North Carolina Secretary of State Democratic Primary Election, 2004
| Party | Candidate | Votes | % |
| Democratic | Elaine Marshall (inc.) | 327,848 | 80.59 |
| Democratic | Doris Sanders | 78,953 | 19.41 |

North Carolina Secretary of State Election, 2004
| Party | Candidate | Votes | % |
| Democratic | Elaine Marshall (inc.) | 1,911,585 | 57.32 |
| Republican | Jay Rao | 1,423,109 | 42.68 |

North Carolina Secretary of State Election, 2008
| Party | Candidate | Votes | % |
| Democratic | Elaine Marshall (inc.) | 2,316,903 | 56.79 |
| Republican | Jack Sawyer | 1,762,928 | 43.21 |

North Carolina U.S. Senate Democratic Primary Election, 2010
| Party | Candidate | Votes | % |
| Democratic | Elaine Marshall | 154,605 | 36.35 |
| Democratic | Cal Cunningham | 115,851 | 27.24 |
| Democratic | Ken Lewis | 72,510 | 17.05 |
| Democratic | Marcus Williams | 35,984 | 8.46 |
| Democratic | Susan Harris | 29,738 | 6.99 |
| Democratic | Ann Worthy | 16,655 | 3.92 |

North Carolina U.S. Senate Democratic Primary Runoff Election, 2010
| Party | Candidate | Votes | % |
| Democratic | Elaine Marshall | 95,390 | 59.96 |
| Democratic | Cal Cunningham | 63,691 | 40.04 |

North Carolina U.S. Senate Election, 2010
| Party | Candidate | Votes | % |
| Republican | Richard Burr (inc.) | 1,458,046 | 54.81 |
| Democratic | Elaine Marshall | 1,145,074 | 43.05 |
| Libertarian | Michael Beitler | 55,687 | 2.09 |
| Write-ins | Write-ins | 1,272 | 0.05 |

North Carolina Secretary of State Election, 2012
| Party | Candidate | Votes | % |
| Democratic | Elaine Marshall (inc.) | 2,331,173 | 53.79 |
| Republican | Ed Goodwin | 2,003,026 | 46.21 |

North Carolina Secretary of State Election, 2016
| Party | Candidate | Votes | % |
| Democratic | Elaine Marshall (inc.) | 2,368,091 | 52.26 |
| Republican | Michael LaPaglia | 2,163,185 | 47.74 |

North Carolina Secretary of State Election, 2020
| Party | Candidate | Votes | % |
| Democratic | Elaine Marshall (inc.) | 2,755,571 | 51.16 |
| Republican | E.C. Sykes | 2,630,559 | 48.84 |

North Carolina Secretary of State Election, 2024
| Party | Candidate | Votes | % |
| Democratic | Elaine Marshall (inc.) | 2,837,994 | 51.04 |
| Republican | Chad Brown | 2,722,794 | 48.96 |

North Carolina Senate
| Preceded by Leo Daughtry | Member of the North Carolina Senate from the 15th district 1993–1995 | Succeeded by Daniel Page |
Political offices
| Preceded by Janice Faulkner | Secretary of State of North Carolina; 1997–present | Incumbent |
Party political offices
| Preceded by Rufus Edmisten | Democratic nominee for North Carolina Secretary of State; 1996, 2000, 2004, 2008, 2012, 2016, 2020, 2024 | Most recent |
| Preceded by Erskine Bowles | Democratic nominee for U.S. Senator from North Carolina (Class 3); 2010 | Succeeded by Deborah Ross |
