= Bryan Grimes =

Confederate Army officer in the American Civil War

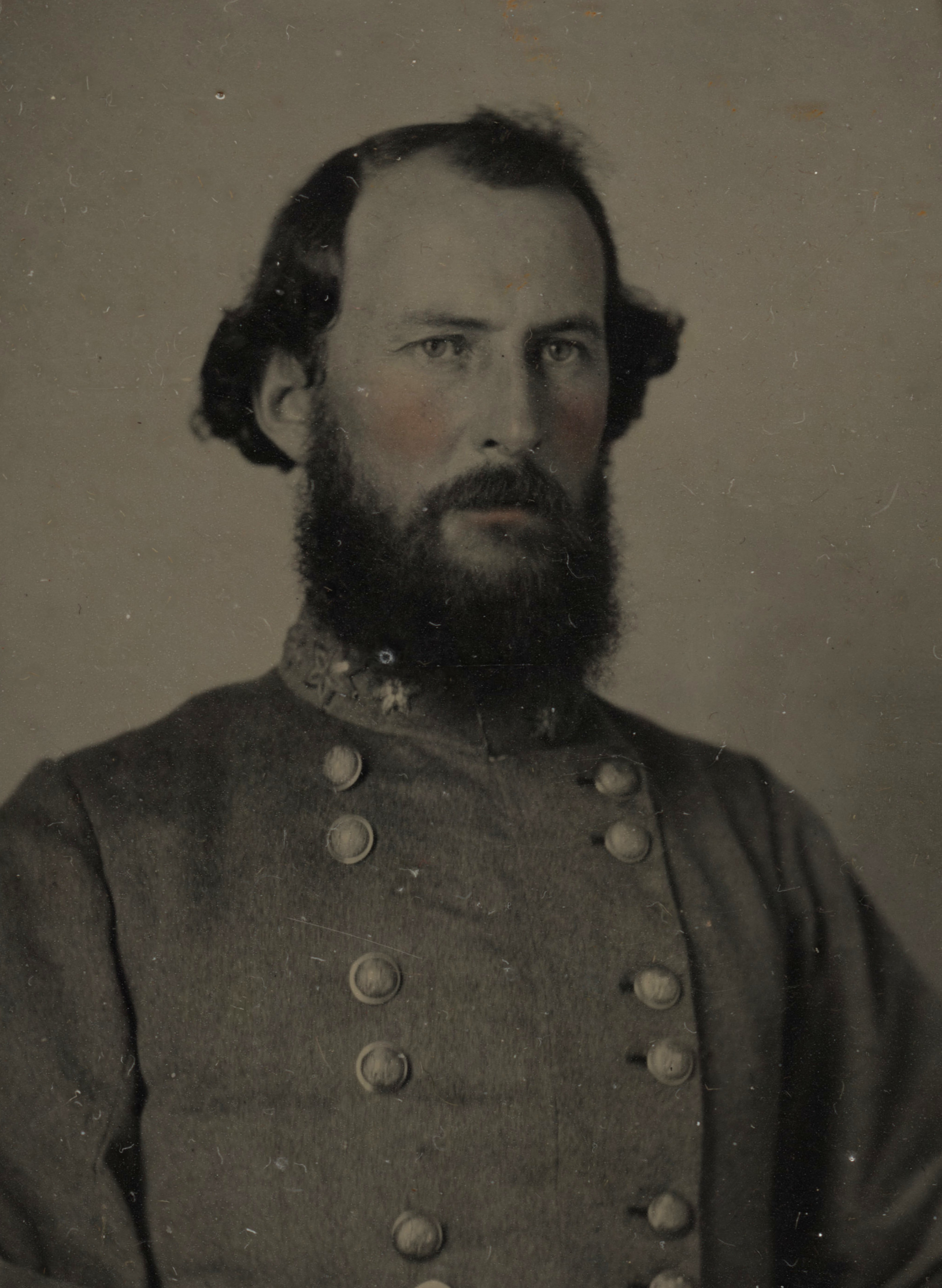
- Bryan Grimes Jr. photo taken in 1864 or 1865
- Born: November 2, 1828; Pitt County, North Carolina
- Died: August 14, 1880 (aged 51); Pitt County, North Carolina
- Burial place: "Grimesland" plantation, North Carolina
- Military career
- Allegiance: United States of America; Confederate States of America
- Branch: Confederate States Army
- Service years: 1861–65
- Rank: Major General
- Commands: 4th North Carolina Infantry Regiment
- Conflicts: American Civil War: First Battle of Manassas; Battle of Seven Pines; Peninsula Campaign; Battle of Fredericksburg; Battle of Chancellorsville; Gettysburg campaign; Overland Campaign; Valley Campaigns of 1864; Siege of Petersburg; Appomattox Campaign
- Other work: planter, university trustee, writer

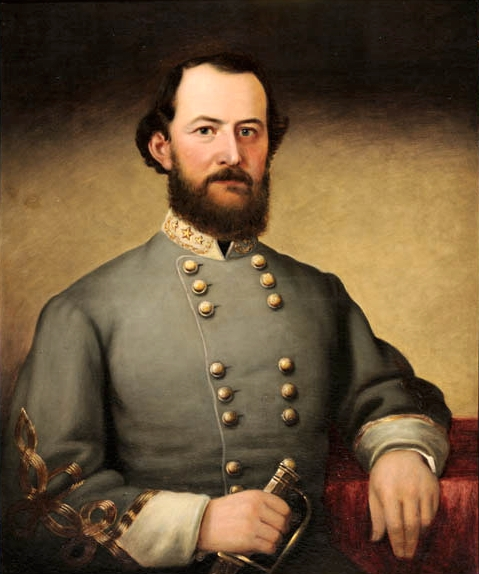
Portrait of Gen. Bryan Grimes, by William George Randall in North Carolina Museum of History.

Bryan Grimes (November 2, 1828 – August 14, 1880) was a Confederate military officer during the American Civil War. He fought in nearly all of the major battles of the Eastern Theater.

Grimes was the last man in the Army of Northern Virginia to be appointed as a major general. He also led the last attack of that army not long before its surrender to Union forces at Appomattox Court House on the morning of April 9, 1865.

== Early life and career ==
Bryan Grimes Jr. was born on the ancestral family plantation, called "Grimesland Plantation," in Pitt County, North Carolina. It was added to the National Register of Historic Places in 1971. His father, Bryan Grimes Sr., was a prosperous planter. His mother, Nancy Grist, was the daughter of a prominent general from Georgia; she died when Grimes was only four months old, and his older sister for a time raised him. He attended school in Nash County and an academy in Washington, North Carolina, before attending a noted private school in Hillsborough. Grimes, at the age of fifteen, enrolled in the University of North Carolina, where he was a member of the Philanthropic Society. He graduated four years later in 1848. In 1849, his father gave him the Grimesland estate, along with control over its 100 slaves. On April 9, 1851, he married Elizabeth Hilliard Davis, but she would die only six years later. The couple had four children, one of whom, Bryan Grimes III, died in childhood. A grief-stricken Grimes later traveled to Europe.

== Civil War service ==
Upon his return to the United States, he was elected as a delegate to North Carolina's secession convention. He resigned from the commission after the passage of the Ordinance of Secession and joined the Confederate Army as the major of the newly formed 4th North Carolina Infantry on May 16, 1861. He saw his first combat action at the First Battle of Manassas in Virginia on July 21. Grimes was promoted to lieutenant colonel on May 1, 1862, and fought at the Battle of Seven Pines, during which he was wounded when his injured horse fell on top of him on May 31. On June 19, 1862, Grimes was promoted to the rank of colonel and given command of the 4th North Carolina Infantry, now part of the Army of Northern Virginia. Grimes led the regiment during the Peninsula Campaign, but missed the Maryland Campaign and the Battle of Sharpsburg due to a severe leg injury incurred when his horse kicked him on September 5 near Edward's Ferry in Maryland. Upon recovery Grimes returned to field duty in temporary command of an infantry brigade within the division of Maj. Gen. Daniel Harvey Hill. He fought with the rest of Stonewall Jackson's Second Corps at the Battle of Fredericksburg that December, where his men repelled a Union attack.

Grimes returned to his regimental command before the 1863 Chancellorsville Campaign, where he was wounded again, this time in a foot, on May 3. During the first day's fighting at Gettysburg, Grimes' regiment was the first organized Confederate unit to enter the streets of Gettysburg, Pennsylvania. He was in charge of the rear guard during a part of the army's retreat into Virginia following the three-day battle. On September 15, 1863, he married Charlotte Emily Bryan, and they eventually had ten children together, including John Bryan Grimes, who would become North Carolina's secretary of state. Again, another son named Bryan Grimes died in childhood.

During the 1864 Overland Campaign, Grimes was promoted to the rank of brigadier general on May 19, and given permanent command of his brigade of North Carolinians. That autumn, he fought in the Shenandoah Valley Campaign as part of the army of Lt. Gen. Jubal A. Early. When Maj. Gen. Stephen D. Ramseur was killed at Cedar Creek, Grimes assumed command of his division on December 9 and led it for the rest of the war. On October 19 while at Cedar Creek he was wounded in a leg.

On February 15, 1865, Grimes was promoted to major general, the last man appointed to that rank in the Army of Northern Virginia. He served in the trenches surrounding Petersburg and joined Robert E. Lee's retreat to the west that ended when the way was blocked by Federal columns near Appomattox Court House. Grimes led an attack that temporarily cleared Federals from the Lynchburg Road, briefly opening up a possible route of escape for a portion of Lee's army. However, Lee chose to surrender instead of risking useless further bloodshed.

Following the Appomattox Campaign, Grimes surrendered along with the rest of the Army of Northern Virginia on April 9, 1865, and was paroled at Appomattox Court House. He was pardoned by the U.S. government on June 26, 1866.

== Postbellum career and death ==
After the war, Grimes returned to North Carolina and settled briefly in Raleigh. He subsequently moved back to Grimesland in January 1867 and resumed farming. Ten years later, he was named as a trustee of the University of North Carolina.

In 1880, Grimes was ambushed and killed in Pitt County, North Carolina, by a hired assassin named William Parker, presumably to prevent him from testifying at a criminal trial. Grimes had taken part in an attempt to deport immigrants, and was killed by their hitman. Parker was later acquitted at his trial. However, a number of years later Parker returned to the area drunk and boasted of his killing Grimes but winning acquittal. He was arrested for drunk and disorderly. That night a mob entered the deserted jail house, grabbed Parker and lynched him. Nobody was ever tried for the act. Grimes was buried in the family cemetery on his plantation, Grimesland, about five miles northwest of Chocowinity, North Carolina. A monument (a cenotaph) to the fallen former Confederate stands in Trinity Churchyard Cemetery located in the village of Chocowinity.

Portions of the letters written home by Grimes throughout the Civil War were published after his death in 1883, entitled Extracts of Letters of Major Gen'l Bryan Grimes, to His Wife.

== In memory ==
In April 1898, the U.S. Army established "Camp Bryan Grimes" in Raleigh and named it for the former Confederate general. It served as a mustering point for North Carolina troops in the Spanish–American War.

The Sons of Confederate Veterans local camp in Greenville, North Carolina, was designated as the Major General Bryan Grimes Camp 1988.

Friends and family erected a cenotaph at Trinity Episcopal Cemetery in Chocowinity, North Carolina, with his accomplishments and Civil War service inscribed upon it.

== See also ==
- List of American Civil War generals (Confederate)
