= Carolina Hall (Chapel Hill, North Carolina) =

1922 building

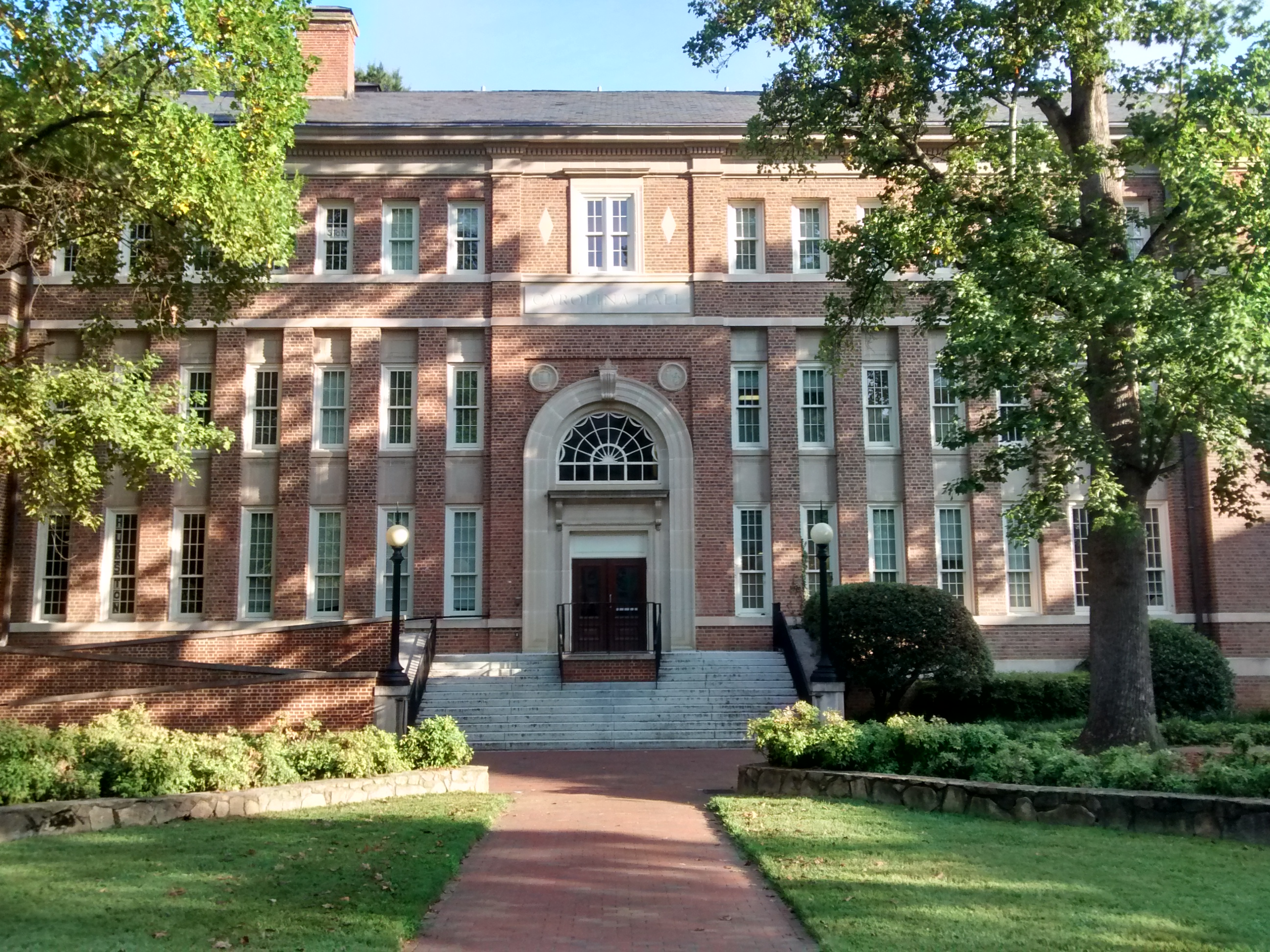
- The building's exterior in 2015

- Location within North Carolina

General information
- Architectural style: Italianate
- Location: University of North Carolina campus, Chapel Hill, North Carolina
- Coordinates: 35°54′40.3″N 79°2′59.7″W
- Completed: 1922
- Governing body: State

Carolina Hall, formerly known as Saunders Hall, is a building on the University of North Carolina at Chapel Hill campus in Chapel Hill, North Carolina, in the United States. Carolina Hall was built in 1922 and named for William L. Saunders, an alumnus, Ku Klux Klan leader, and a colonel in the Confederate States Army during the American Civil War. The name was changed to "Carolina Hall" in 2015.

== Foundation and Renaming ==
The University of North Carolina at Chapel Hill named the building after William L. Saunders in 1922, thirty years after his death. The university named the building Saunders Hall in order to commemorate William L. Saunders' service as a confederate colonel, state secretary of state, and as "Head of the Ku Klux Klan in North Carolina." Saunders Hall was built in the main quad of the University of North Carolina at Chapel Hill campus and remained there for 93 years. In 2014, university students asked trustees to rename the building due to Saunders' role as a Ku Klux Klan leader. Many asked to change the name to "Hurston Hall" to honor Zora Neale Hurston. The Board of Trustees passed a resolution to rename the building, with 10 of the 13 trustees voting for the resolution. In May 2015, the university announced that the building would be renamed "Carolina Hall", and it was officially renamed on August 13, 2015. The Board of Trustees also formulated a plan to forbid any name changes to other buildings on campus for sixteen years.

== Protests ==
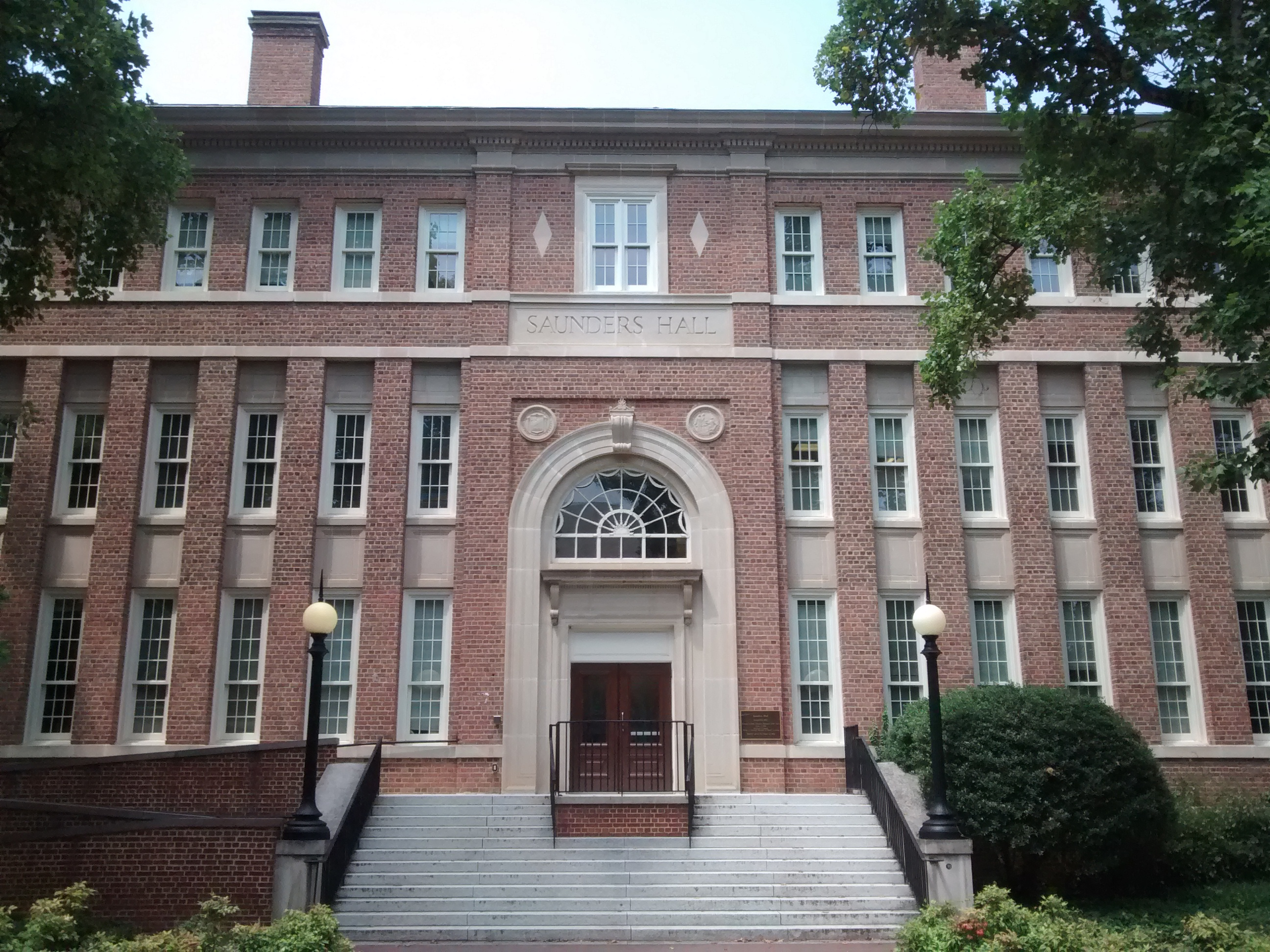
Saunders Hall in 2014, before the renaming

University students protested the name "Saunders Hall" starting in 2001, when the Black Student Movement began protesting the building's name. The Real Silent Sam Coalition, an advocacy group dedicated to raising awareness about the racialized history of spaces on campus, launched a movement in 2015 to rename Saunders Hall, place a plaque on Silent Sam that contextualizes its history, and implement a historical tour of the racialized space on campus for first-year students. The 10–3 vote to make the changes reflected a divisions among trustees about how to address the university's racial history. Other buildings on campus named after people associated with white supremacy include the Julian Shakespeare Carr Building, Josephus Daniels Student Stores, John Washington Graham Residence Hall, J.G. de Roulhac Hamilton Hall, Cameron Morrison Residence Hall, John J. Parker Residence Hall, Thomas Ruffin Residence Hall and Cornelia Phillips Spencer Hall.

== See also ==
- List of National Historic Landmarks in North Carolina
- Old Well
