= North Carolina Secretary of State =

Political office in North Carolina, United States

Secretary of State of North Carolina
- Seal of the North Carolina Secretary of State

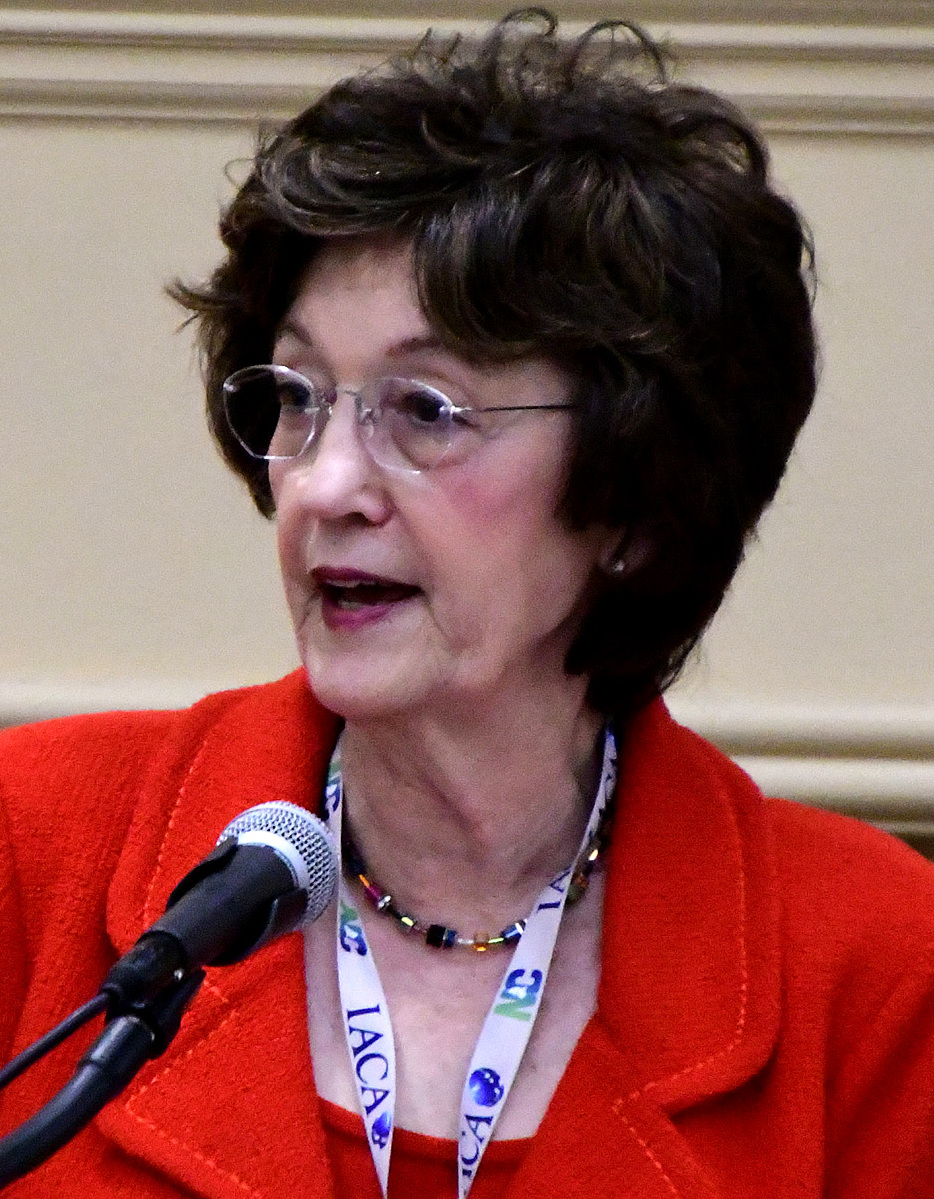
- Incumbent; Elaine Marshall since January 6, 1997
- Status: Constitutional officer
- Member of: Council of State
- Seat: Raleigh, North Carolina
- Appointer: General election
- Term length: Four years, no term limits
- Inaugural holder: James Glasgow
- Formation: November 12, 1776 (249 years ago)
- Succession: Fourth
- Salary: $168,384
- Website: www.sosnc.gov

The North Carolina Secretary of State is an elected constitutional officer in the executive branch of the government of the U.S. state of North Carolina, and is fourth in the line of succession to the office of Governor of North Carolina. The secretary maintains the official journal of the North Carolina General Assembly and is responsible for overseeing land records, chartering corporations, and administering some commercial regulations. The incumbent is Elaine Marshall, a Democrat and the first woman elected to the office.

The office traces its origins to the office of the Colonial Secretary of Carolina, created in 1665, and was formally created as an office in 1776. Since 1868, the secretary has been popularly elected every four years. The office's responsibilities—determined by statute—have varied over its existence. Historically weaker than their contemporaries around the United States, the secretary does not oversee elections in the state. They lead the Department of Secretary of State and sit on the North Carolina Council of State.

== History of the office ==
In 1665, the Lord Proprietors of the Province of Carolina created the office of the Colonial Secretary of Carolina. The inaugural secretary, Richard Cobthrop, never travelled to America, but most of the subsequent 23 secretaries came to Carolina. In 1675, the secretary became responsible to the King of England, and was largely tasked with clerical duties relating to land ownership. Following the United States Declaration of Independence, North Carolina created a constitution in 1776 which provided for the North Carolina General Assembly to "triennially appoint a secretary for this State." The Assembly appointed James Glasgow to the office in December and reappointed him the following year. He held the office for over 20 years before resigning due to allegations that he had issued fraudulent land warrants. William Hill served as secretary from 1811 to 1857, setting the record tenure for the office until the 20th century. When the North Carolina State House caught fire in 1831, he saved many of the office's records. Constitutional amendments passed in 1835 shortened the secretary's term of office from three to two years.

In 1868, North Carolina created a new constitution, which provided for the popular election of the secretary of state with four-year terms and no term limits. Thad A. Eure held the office from 1936 to 1989, setting the latest record tenure. Most secretaries of the state have come from eastern North Carolina. Rufus L. Edmisten, sworn in in 1989, was the first one to come from the western portion of the state. Janice Faulkner, appointed by the Governor of North Carolina in 1996 to fill the vacancy created by Edmisten's resignation, became the first woman to hold the office. Elaine Marshall, who assumed the office in 1997, was the first woman ever elected to a North Carolina statewide executive office. Since the passage of the Executive Reorganization Act of 1971, the secretary's agency has been the Department of Secretary of State.

The office's responsibilities—determined by statute—have varied over its existence. The secretariat managed the issuance of land grants from its colonial creation until 1957. In 1831, the secretary was briefly designated state librarian. In 1868, a Bureau of Statistics, Agriculture, and Immigration was placed within the office and remained there until a separate Department of Agriculture was created in 1877. The office has also at times been responsible for insurance regulation, vehicle registration, and collection of the state gas tax. Until the General Assembly was moved to the State Legislative Building and given a professional staff in the 1960s, the secretary was responsible for assisting it in several matters, including seating assignments in the legislative chambers, enrolling acts and resolutions before their ratification, and indexing and printing the session laws. A 1968 constitutional study commission recommended making the governor responsible for the selection of the secretary to reduce voters' burden by shortening the ballot, but this proposal was disregarded by the General Assembly when it revised the state constitution in 1971. The State Board of Elections briefly operated under the secretary from 1971 to 1972.

== Powers, duties, and structure ==
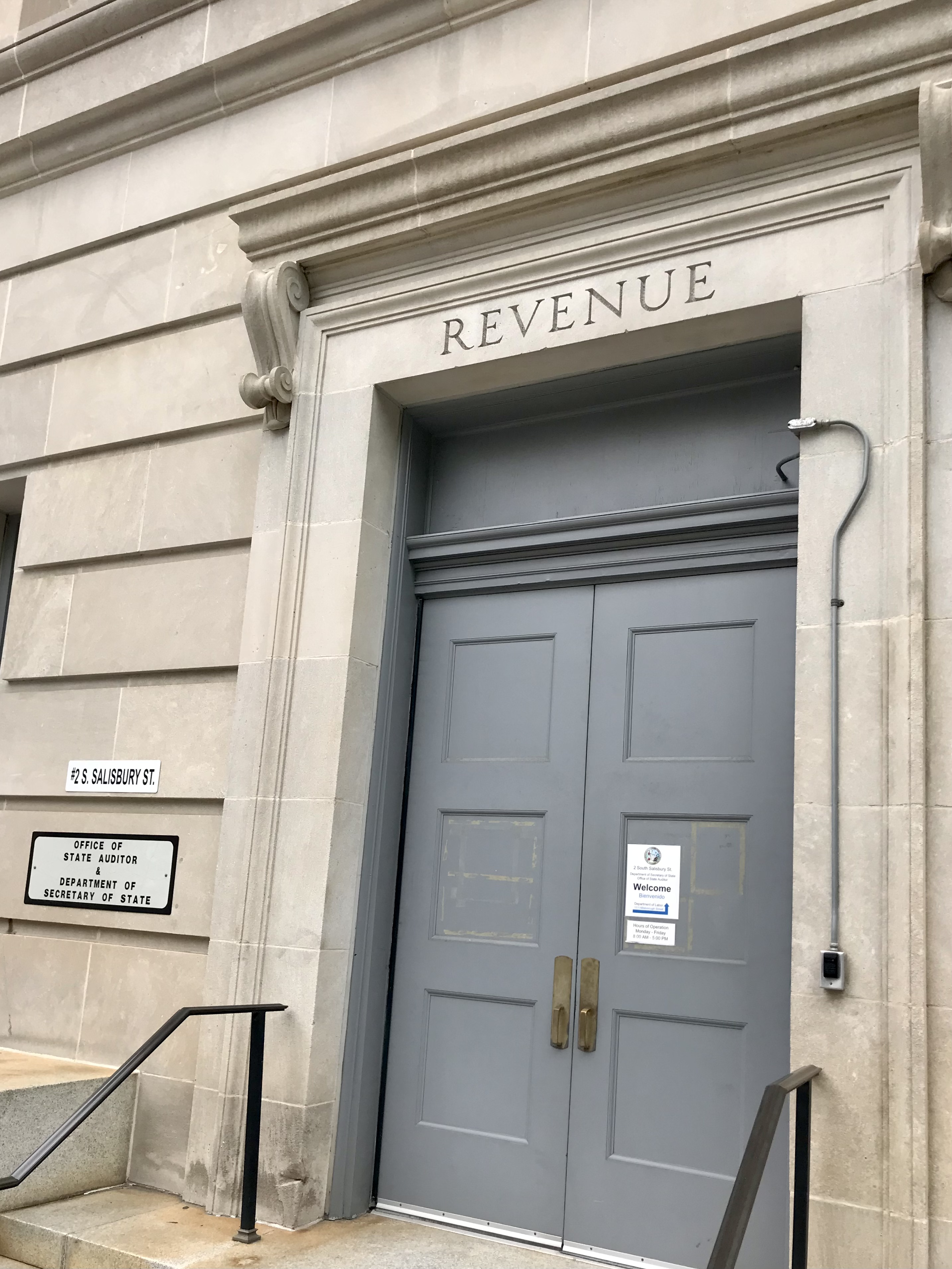
The secretary of state maintains offices in the Revenue Building (pictured) at 2 S Salisbury St. in Raleigh.

The secretary of state is a constitutional officer. Article III, Section 7, of the Constitution of North Carolina stipulates the popular election of the secretary of state every four years. The office holder is not subject to term limits. In the event of a vacancy in the office, the Governor of North Carolina has the authority to appoint a successor until a candidate is elected at the next general election for members of the General Assembly. Per Article III, Section 8 of the constitution, the secretary sits on the Council of State. They maintain the schedule and agenda of council meetings. They are ex officio a member of the Local Government Commission and Capital Planning Commission. They are fourth in line of succession to the governor.

Historically, the North Carolina Secretary of State has been weaker than their contemporaries around the United States. Unlike in other states, where the secretary of state serves as the chief elections officer, in North Carolina the State Board of Elections administers elections independently of other agencies. With regards to elections, the secretary is responsible for storing official copies of election results sent to them by the State Board of Elections and arranging the meeting of North Carolina's presidential electors every four years. The secretary is charged with attending sessions of the General Assembly to obtain possession of laws passed by it, and maintains the official journals of each house. They also administer the North Carolina Securities Act and the Uniform Commercial Code, charter corporations, register trademarks, manage land records, and register legislative lobbyists. They are empowered to investigate violations of lobbying laws and impose civil fines not exceeding $5,000 for infractions. The secretary commissions notaries public in the state, and they are empowered to administer oaths of office to public officials and law enforcement officers. They attend the ceremonies in which an outgoing governor turns over the Great Seal of North Carolina to their successor.

The Department of Secretary of State has several divisions and sections: corporations division, publications division, securities division, trademarks section, Uniform Commercial Code section, authentications section, charitable solicitation licensing section, land records section, lobbyist compliance division, and notary public section. As of January 2025, the department has 167 employees retained under the terms of the State Human Resources Act. As with all Council of State officers, the secretary of state's salary is fixed by the General Assembly and cannot be reduced during their term of office. As of 2025, the secretary's annual salary is $168,384.

== List of secretaries of state ==
North Carolina Secretaries of State
No.	Secretary of State	Term in office	Party	Source
1	James Glasgow	1776 – 1798	—N/a	
2	William White	1798 – 1811	—N/a	
3	William Hill	1811 – 1857	—N/a	
4	Rufus H. Page	1857 – 1862	—N/a	
5	John P. H. Russ	1862 – 1865	—N/a	
6	Charles R. Thomas	1865	—N/a	
7	Robert W. Best	1866 – 1868	—N/a	
8	Henry J. Menninger	1868 – 1873	Republican	
9	William H. Howerton	1873 – 1877	Republican	
10	Joseph Adolphus Engelhard	1877 – 1879	Democratic	
11	William L. Saunders	1879 – 1891	Democratic	
12	Octavius Coke	1891 – 1895	Democratic	
13	Charles M. Cooke	1895 – 1897	Democratic	
14	Cyrus Thompson	1897 – 1901	Populist	
15	John Bryan Grimes	1901 – 1923	Democratic	
16	William N. Everett	1923 – 1928	Democratic	
17	James A. Hartness	1928 – 1933	Democratic	
18	Stacey W. Wade	1933 – 1936	Democratic	
19	Charles G. Powell	1936	Democratic	
20	Thad A. Eure	1936 – 1989	Democratic	
21	Rufus L. Edmisten	1989 – 1996	Democratic	
22	Janice Faulkner	1996 – 1997	Democratic	
23	Elaine Marshall	1997 – present	Democratic	

== Works cited ==
- Betts, Jack (August 1989). "The Department of the Secretary of State: Which Way Now?" (PDF). North Carolina Insight. pp. 2–20.
- Cheney, John L. Jr., ed. (1981). North Carolina Government, 1585-1979 : A Narrative and Statistical History (revised ed.). Raleigh: North Carolina Secretary of State. OCLC 1290270510.
- Cooper, Christopher A.; Knotts, H. Gibbs, eds. (2012). The New Politics of North Carolina. Chapel Hill: University of North Carolina Press. ISBN 9781469606583.
- Fleer, Jack (2007). Governors Speak. University Press of America. ISBN 9780761835646.
- Fleer, Jack D. (1994). North Carolina Government & Politics. Lincoln: University of Nebraska Press. ISBN 9780803268852.
- Guillory, Ferrel (June 1988). "The Council of State and North Carolina's Long Ballot : A Tradition Hard to Change" (PDF). N.C. Insight. N.C. Center for Public Policy Research. pp. 40–44.
- North Carolina Manual (PDF). Raleigh: North Carolina Department of the Secretary of State. 2011. OCLC 2623953. Archived from the original (PDF) on 2023-08-02.
- Orth, John V.; Newby, Paul M. (2013). The North Carolina State Constitution (second ed.). Oxford University Press. ISBN 9780199300655.
- Potter, William H. Jr. (1975). "Staff Services to the North Carolina General Assembly". Popular Government. Vol. 40, no. 4. UNC Institute of Government. pp. 27–30.
