= 1st North Carolina Infantry Regiment (Union) =

American Civil War military unit

1st North Carolina Union Volunteer Infantry Regiment
- Active: 1862–1865
- Country: United States
- Allegiance: United States Union
- Branch: Union Army; Infantry
- Size: Regiment
- Engagements: American Civil War: Battle of Washington; Battle of Plymouth (1864)

The 1st North Carolina Union Volunteer Infantry Regiment was a military unit of the Union Army during the American Civil War recruited from coastal counties in North Carolina. The Regiment was made up of Southern Unionists and deserters from the Confederate Army, and fought in several battles in North Carolina before being disbanded in the summer of 1865.

== History ==
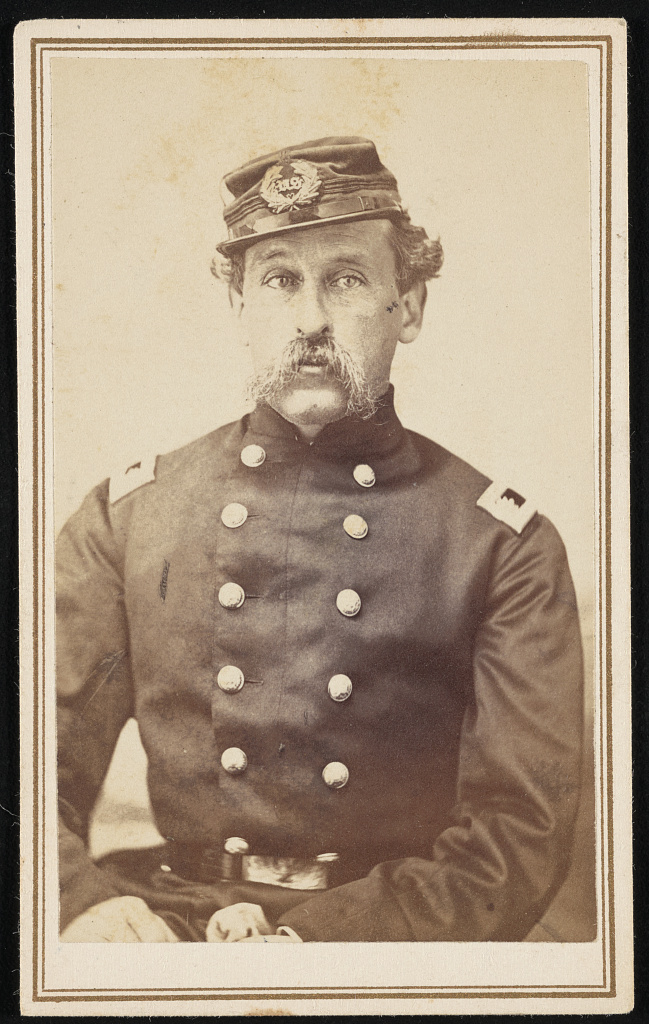
Lt. Col. James H. Strong, 1st North Carolina Infantry.

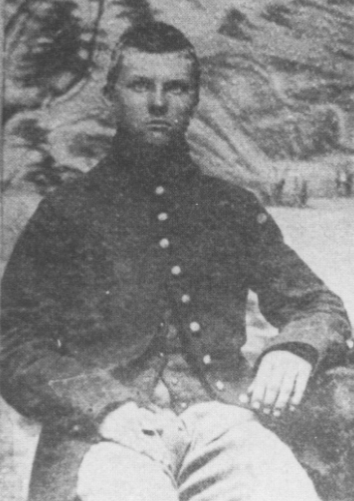
Corporal Charles Freeman, a native of Bertie County, Company C, 1st North Carolina Infantry.

After Union General Ambrose Burnside captured parts of the North Carolina coast during his 1861–1862 campaign, he initiated the recruitment of local North Carolina troops for the Union Army in May 1862. The creation of the 1st North Carolina Union Volunteer Infantry Regiment was authorized in May 1862, at Washington, North Carolina, and men began mustering into the regiment in June. A total of 1,050 men joined the 10 companies of the 1st North Carolina, at least 114 of these soldiers had formerly been in Confederate or North Carolina state units and joined the Union army after deserting from the Confederate Army.

Union Major General John J. Peck complained about the quality of the North Carolina recruits: "Some of these officers...enlist all the men they can possibly persuade, without the slightest regard to their capacity, either mental or physical." Peck was also concerned about "virtual impressment and fraudulent enlistment," in the 1st & 2nd North Carolina Regiments, including the recruitment of underage and over-age soldiers.

Unlike most Civil War Regiments, the different companies of the 1st North Carolina did not operate as a combined unit, they were sent on assignments separately. Besides garrison duty at coastal forts and other strategic points, the troops of the 1st North Carolina were engaged in several skirmishes and battles across their home state. Company A fought in a skirmish at Washington on September 6, 1862, suffering 8 killed and 4 wounded. During the siege of Washington in the spring of 1863, Company A lost 2 killed and 4 wounded. A detachment of the 1st North Carolina, alongside other Union troops, captured 50 Confederates near Greenville on November 25, 1863. Company L suffered 4 casualties at Plymouth in December 1862. Companies D & E fought against Confederate partisan ranger irregular units in northeastern North Carolina in what has been described as a guerilla war. Attacks on local civilians by Company E led to Union authorities removing that company from the region and sending it to Washington, NC in March 1863. Otherwise, the companies of the 1st North Carolina were assigned to garrison duty at Plymouth, Washington, Portsmouth, New Bern, Beaufort, Fort Clark, Fort Hatteras, Fort Hickman, and Fort Macon.

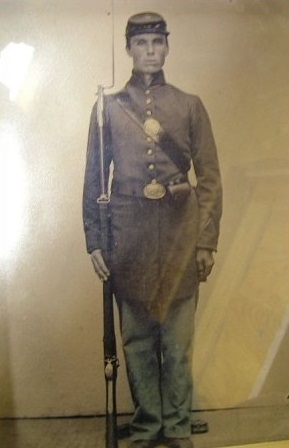
James Daniel Boyd - 1st North Carolina Union Volunteers

At being captured during the February 1864 Battle of New Bern, 22 soldiers of the 2nd North Carolina were executed as deserters by the Confederate Army. These killings, the only large-scale execution of deserters during the Civil War, shook morale in both the 1st and 2nd North Carolina Volunteer Regiments. Afterwards the 1st North Carolina was mostly kept on garrison duty, for fear the troops would be captured and executed as their fellow North Carolinians in the 2nd Regiment had been, as Union general Innis N. Palmer described: "The North Carolina troops I considered useless unless they were placed at some point where they could consider themselves secure from capture, as the execution of the Carolina troops at Kinston had very much demoralized the whole of them. They would have been useless to General Butler, and I have placed them all in the Sub-District of Beaufort, where, as they feel secure, they will, I hope, become reliable."

The 2nd Regiment was merged with the 1st North Carolina Volunteer Regiment on February 27, 1865, and the combined unit was mustered out of service on June 27, 1865.

== Commanders ==
Officers of the 1st North Carolina Infantry:

- Lt. Col. Oscar Eastmond
- Lt. Col. James H. Strong

== Organization ==
Companies of the 1st North Carolina Infantry:

- Company A, from Beaufort, Tyrrell, Pitt, & Bertie Counties.
- Company B, from Washington.
- Company C, from Plymouth.
- Company D, from Camden and Currituck Counties.
- Company E, from Chowan County.
- Company F, from Beaufort and Carteret Counties.
- Company G, from New Bern.
- Company H, from Hatteras Inlet.
- Company I, from Hatteras Inlet.
- Company L, from Plymouth.

== See also ==
- List of North Carolina Union Civil War units
- North Carolina in the American Civil War
- Galvanized Yankees
