= 2nd North Carolina Infantry Regiment =

American Civil War military unit

2nd North Carolina Union Volunteer Infantry Regiment
- Active: 1863–1865
- Country: United States
- Allegiance: United States Union
- Branch: Union Army
- Size: Regiment
- Engagements: American Civil War: Battle of New Bern (1864); Battle of Plymouth (1864)

The 2nd North Carolina Infantry Regiment was a military unit in the Union Army during the American Civil War recruited from coastal counties in North Carolina. The Regiment was made up of Southern Unionists and deserters from the Confederate Army. After being captured in the Battle of New Bern by Confederate forces under General George Pickett, 22 soldiers of the 2nd Volunteers were executed as Confederate deserters in February 1864.

== History ==
After Union General Ambrose Burnside captured parts of the North Carolina coast during his 1861–1862 campaign, he authorized the recruitment of local North Carolina troops for the Union army in May 1862. The 1st North Carolina Union Volunteer Infantry Regiment was formed in June 1862, and the 2nd Regiment US Volunteers was formed in November 1863 at New Bern, North Carolina. The 2nd Regiment had a total strength of 350 men in 5 companies. Unlike most Civil War Regiments, the different companies of the 1st & 2nd North Carolina Volunteers did not operate as a combined regiment, the companies were sent on assignments separately.

Beaufort, North Carolina was a recruiting center for the 2nd Regiment. 92 men of the 2nd Volunteer Regiment had formerly been in Confederate service. Confederate prisoners of war were enticed to join after swearing a loyalty oath to the Union, and Confederate deserters were also recruited to join the US volunteer regiments. Union Major General John J. Peck complained about the quality of the North Carolina recruits: "Some of these officers...enlist all the men they can possibly persuade, without the slightest regard to their capacity, either mental or physical." Peck was also concerned about "virtual impressment and fraudulent enlistment," in the 1st & 2nd North Carolina Regiments, including the recruitment of underage and over-age soldiers.

Company F of the 2nd Regiment took part in the Battle of New Bern in February 1864, where several men were captured and later executed, and Companies B and E fought at the Siege of Plymouth, on April 17–20, 1864. Several companies of the 2nd Regiment were assigned to garrison duty at Fort Macon and Beaufort. The 2nd Regiment was merged with the 1st North Carolina Volunteer Regiment on February 27, 1865, and the combined unit was mustered out of service in the summer of 1865.

== Execution of 2nd North Carolina troops by Confederates ==
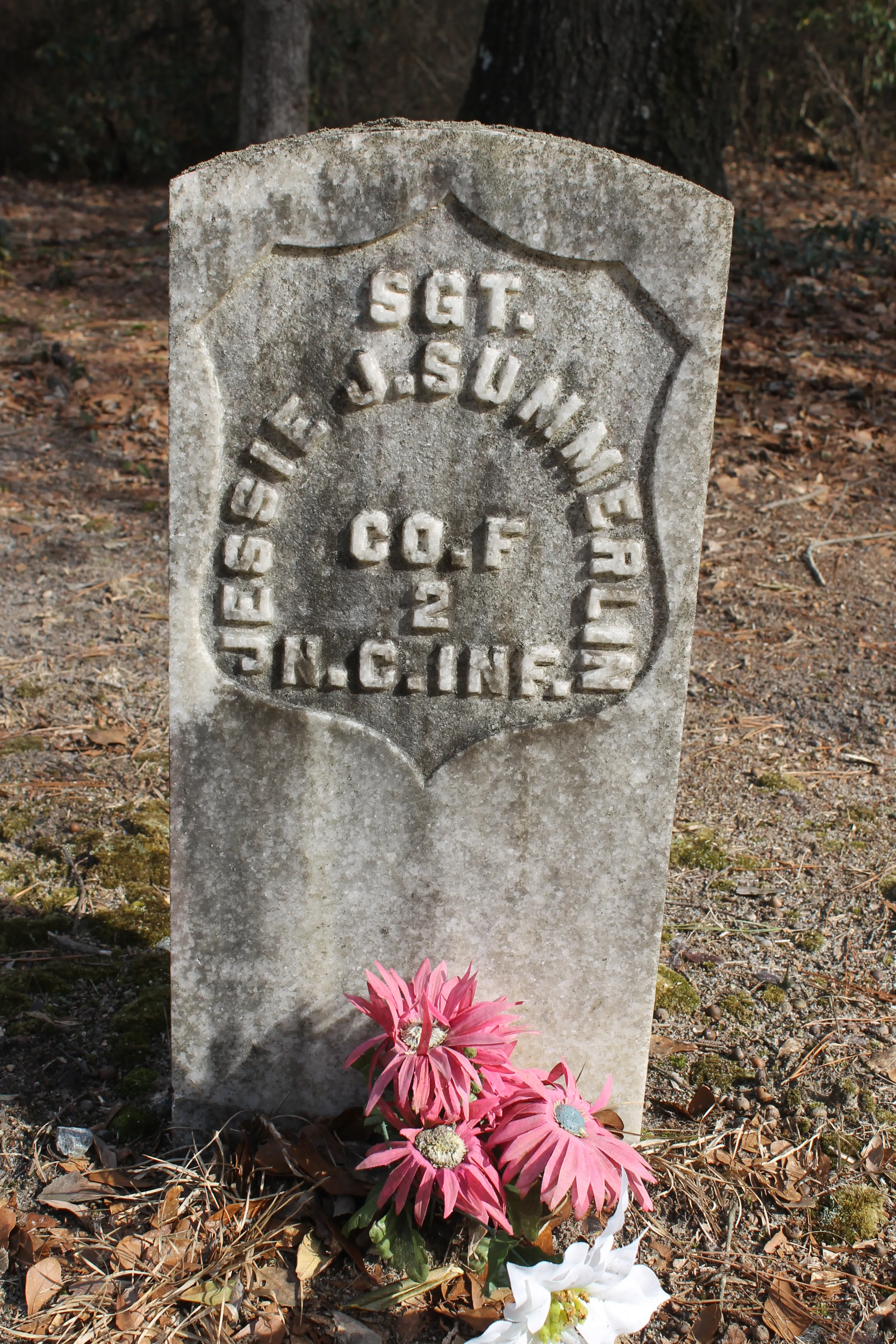
Sgt. Jessie Summerlin

At the 1864 Battle of New Bern, Company F of the 2nd Volunteer Regiment was tasked with holding an isolated outpost. On February 1, Confederate troops under General Robert Hoke attacked their position, and the Union troops surrendered. 53 men from Company F were taken prisoner. Several of the North Carolinians were recognized by Confederate troops with whom they had previously served, and General George Pickett was alerted that Confederate deserters were among the prisoners. Treatment of Confederate deserters in North Carolina had previously been lenient. Desertion was not a crime under North Carolina law, and the Chief Justice of the North Carolina Supreme Court, Richmond Mumford Pearson, believed that conscription was unconstitutional. Pearson generally granted writs of habeas corpus to North Carolina conscripts and deserters who appealed to the court.

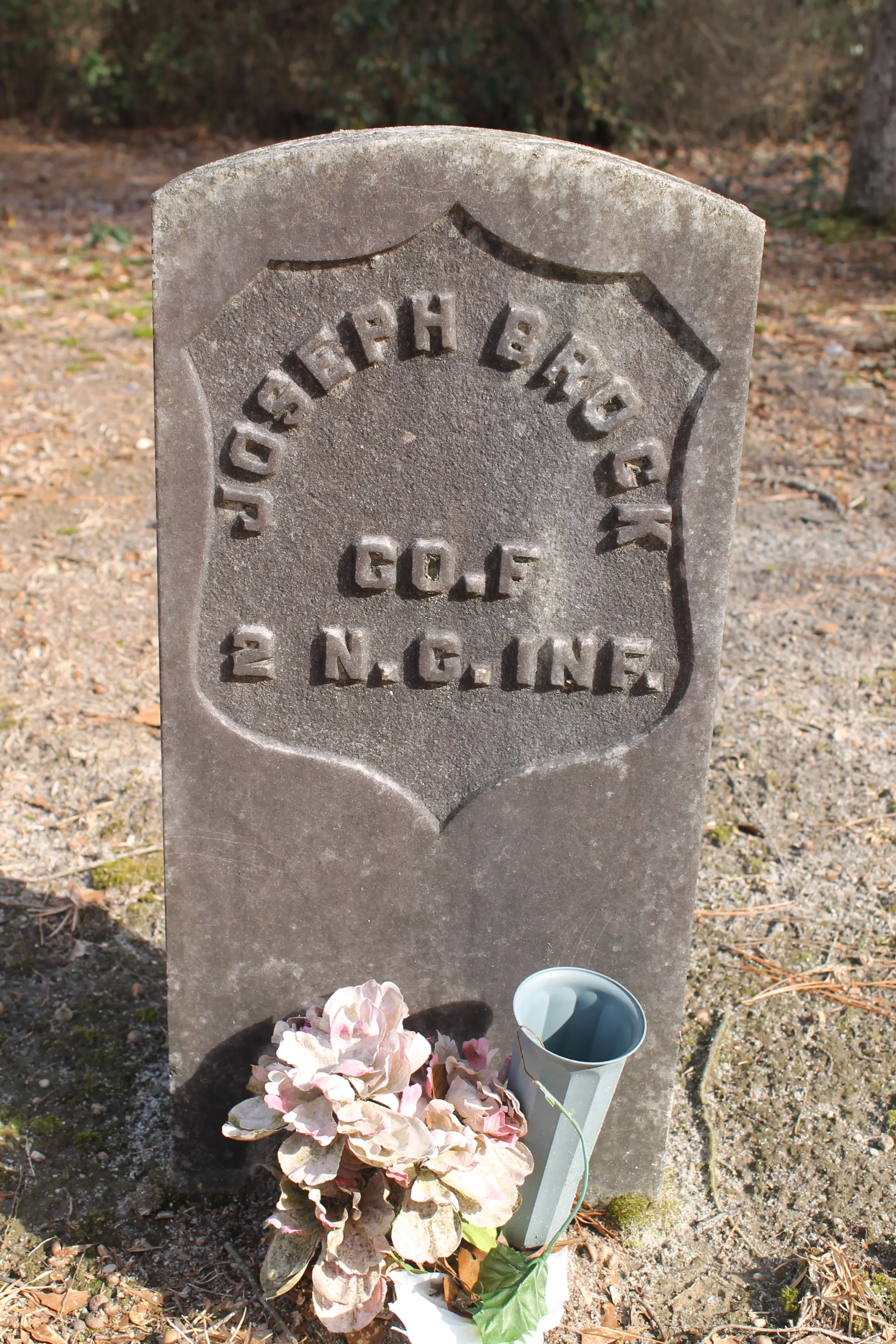
Joseph Brock

The captured men had been members of North Carolina Partisan Ranger companies or railroad guard units, and not in regular Confederate Army service. These local irregular units were consolidated in October 1863 into the 66th Regiment North Carolina State Troops. Members of the companies being consolidated were offered the choice of voluntarily joining the 66th or being subject to Confederate conscription, which would have placed them either in the 66th or another regiment. Under the reasoning that the Union prisoners had been subject to conscription and had deserted to the enemy, General Pickett ordered that they should be court-martialed as deserters and punished with execution if found guilty.

The prisoners were taken to the town of Kinston, North Carolina and held in the local jail. They were court-martialed, and 22 were sentenced to death by hanging. Two men were hanged on February 5, five on February 12, 13 on February 15, and two on February 22. All of the executed men had been in the Union service less than 90 days. The hangings took place in Kinston under the supervision of Hoke's brigade and in view of the civilian population. These hangings were the only mass execution of deserters by the Confederate army during the war.

The remaining 2nd Regiment prisoners were treated as normal prisoners of war. They were sent to POW camps at Richmond, Virginia, and later Andersonville, Georgia, where Union prisoners suffered from outbreaks of disease in overcrowded and unsanitary conditions. Three of the remaining captives were paroled from POW camps and released, four have no further records, and 25 died at Andersonville.

== Aftermath of the executions ==
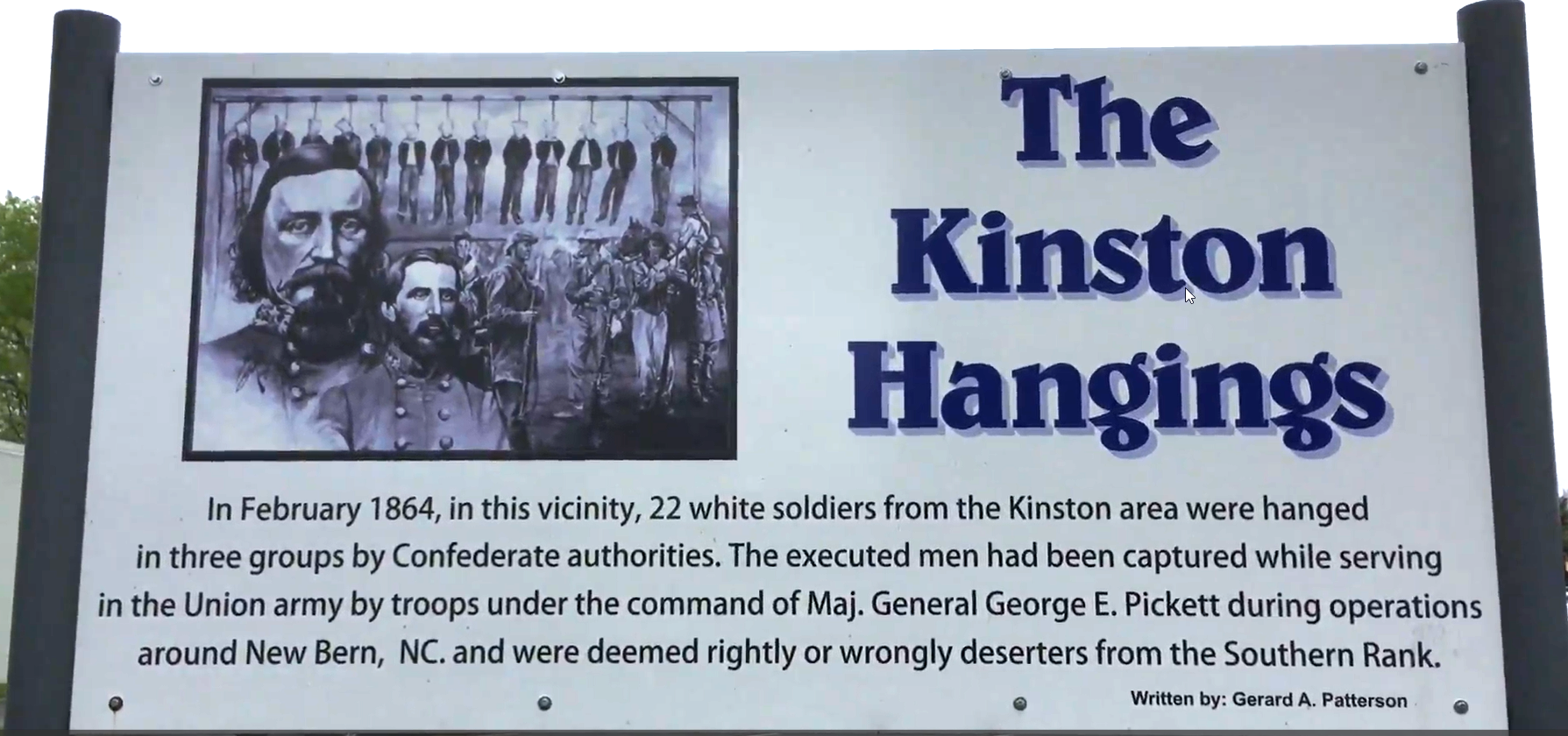
Kinston Hangings

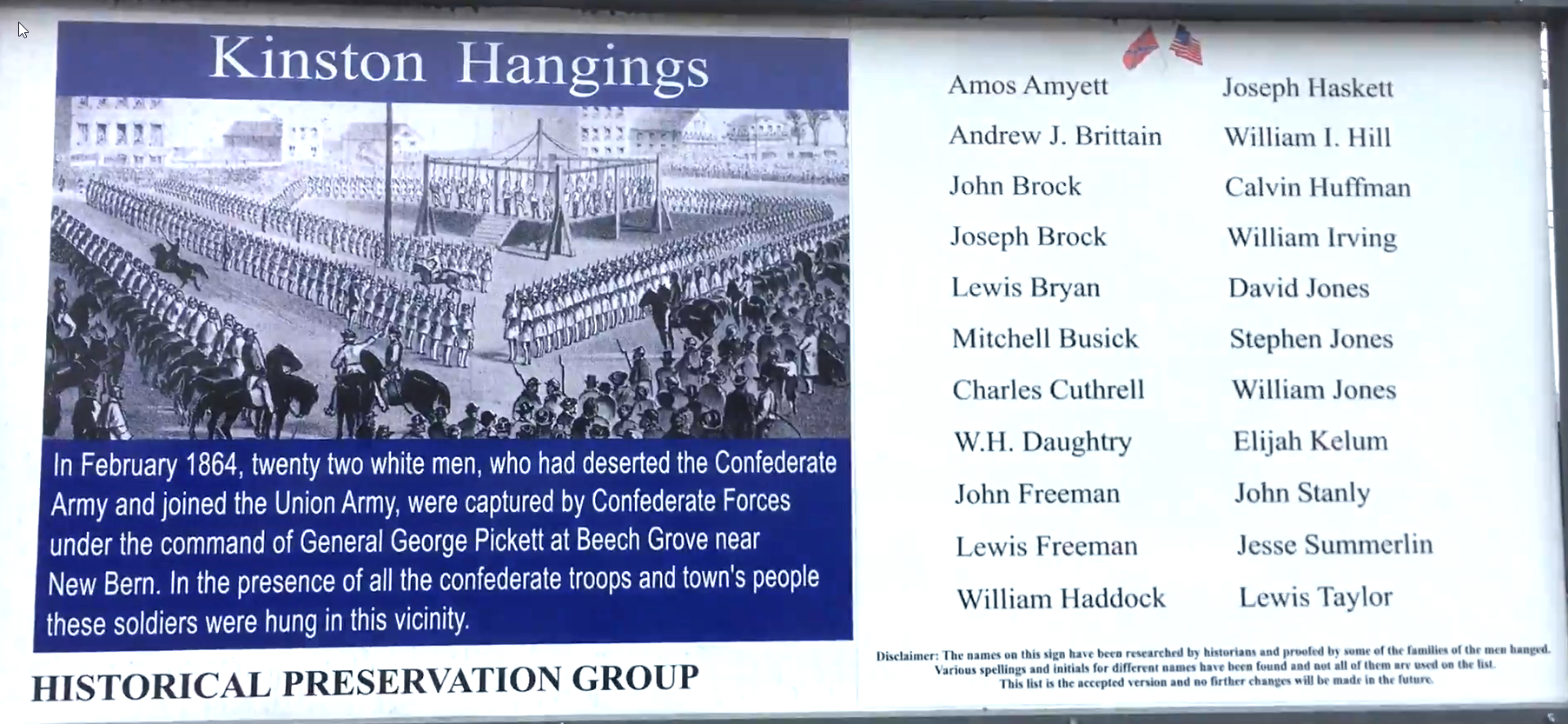
Kinston Hangings

The killings stirred outrage in the North, Southern newspapers praised Pickett's actions. Morale was severely shaken in both the 1st and 2nd North Carolina Volunteer Regiments, Union General Innis N. Palmer wrote: "The North Carolina troops I considered useless unless they were placed at some point where they could consider themselves secure from capture, as the execution of the Carolina troops at Kinston had very much demoralized the whole of them. They would have been useless to General Butler, and I have placed them all in the Sub-District of Beaufort, where, as they feel secure, they will, I hope, become reliable."

The US House of Representatives opened an investigation into the executions in 1866, producing an 89-page report containing Pickett's correspondence on the matter and the findings of their investigation. Pickett feared being prosecuted as a war criminal, he fled to Canada after the war for a year until the US dropped its investigation at the urging of Ulysses S. Grant. Pickett and Hoke were never charged with any crime relating to the killings.

== See also ==
- List of North Carolina Union Civil War units
- North Carolina in the American Civil War
- Galvanized Yankees
