= List of Union units from North Carolina in the American Civil War =

This is a List of Union units from North Carolina in the American Civil War. As in almost all Southern states during the American Civil War, a number of units were raised to fight for the US Army, from pro-Union citizens and former slaves. North Carolina provided four white Union Army regiments, and four black Union Army regiments. Approximately 10,000 white North Carolinians, and 5,000 Black North Carolinians, joined Union Army units.

The list of North Carolina Confederate Civil War units is shown separately.

== Infantry ==
- 1st North Carolina Union Volunteer Infantry Regiment
- 2nd North Carolina Union Volunteer Infantry Regiment
- 1st North Carolina Union Volunteer Infantry Regiment (African Descent) – redesignated 35th United States Colored Infantry Regiment
- 2nd North Carolina Union Volunteer Infantry Regiment (African Descent) – redesignated 36th United States Colored Infantry Regiment
- 3rd North Carolina Union Volunteer Infantry Regiment (African Descent) – redesignated 37th United States Colored Infantry Regiment

== Mounted Infantry ==
- 2nd North Carolina Union Volunteer Mounted Infantry Regiment
- 3rd North Carolina Union Volunteer Mounted Infantry Regiment

== Artillery ==
- 1st North Carolina Heavy Artillery Regiment (African Descent) – redesignated 14th United States Colored Artillery Regiment

== See also ==
- Lists of American Civil War Regiments by State
- Southern Unionists
- United States Colored Troops
