= USS Southfield =

Gunboat of the United States Navy

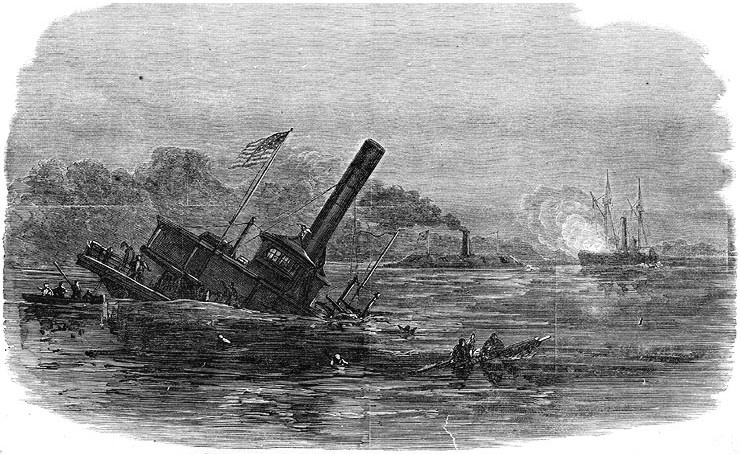
- USS Southfield, sinking after a battle with CSS Albemarle

History

United States
- Name: USS Southfield
- Builder: John English, Brooklyn
- Launched: 1857
- Commissioned: December 1861
- Decommissioned: April 1864
- Fate: Sunk by CSS Albemarle, 19 April 1864

General characteristics
- Type: Sidewheel gunboat
- Displacement: 750 long tons (762 t)
- Length: 200 ft (61 m)
- Beam: 34 ft (10 m)
- Draft: 6 ft 6 in (1.98 m)
- Depth of hold: 11 ft 8 in (3.56 m)
- Propulsion: Steam engine
- Speed: 12 knots (22 km/h; 14 mph)
- Complement: 61 officers and men
- Armament: 1 × 100-pounder Parrott rifle; 3 × 8 in (203 mm) smoothbore Dahlgren guns

USS Southfield was a double-ended, sidewheel steam gunboat of the Union Navy during the American Civil War. She was sunk in action against the Confederate ironclad ram CSS Albemarle during the Battle of Plymouth (1864).

Southfield was built in 1857 at Brooklyn, New York by John English, and served as a ferry between South Ferry, New York, and St. George, Staten Island, until she was purchased by the U.S. Navy at New York City on December 16, 1861 from the New York Ferry Company. She was commissioned late in December 1861, Acting Volunteer Lieutenant Charles F. W. Behm in command.

== Service history ==
=== Battle of Roanoke Island, 1862 ===
The double-ended gunboat joined the North Atlantic Blockading Squadron at Hampton Roads on the afternoon of January 2, 1862. On January 11, Admiral Louis M. Goldsborough ordered Southfield to proceed to Hatteras Inlet, North Carolina, the staging area for an expedition against Roanoke Island, which controlled navigation in the North Carolina sounds. The gunboat was detained at Hampton Roads awaiting troops to fill out her complement until about sunset on January 16 when she got underway south. She reached Hatteras Inlet the next day.

Great labor was required to get Goldsborough's ships and the U.S. Army transports over Hatteras bar. The last vessel entered the sounds on February 5, enabling the expedition to get underway.

The next morning, February 6, Goldsborough shifted his flag from the deep draft USS Philadelphia to Southfield since the double-ender was more nimble in shallow water. From her deck, he directed the attack on Confederate defenses, which began on the morning of February 7 with a heavy bombardment of Fort Bartow and was continued until dark. Late in the afternoon, Army troops under Brigadier General Ambrose Burnside landed under the cover of the naval gunfire.

The attack was resumed on the morning of February 8 and pressed until about midafternoon, when the Union flag flew over Fort Bartow. Shortly thereafter, the Union ships managed to break through the Confederate obstruction and enter Albemarle Sound.

The capture of Roanoke Island assured the Union forces free access to North Carolina's vast system of inland waterways and endangered the South's hold on much of North Carolina and Virginia. Norfolk, Virginia, a Southern strong point of special strategic importance, was flanked; and, in a few months, it was abandoned.

Goldsborough was vigorous in exploiting the opening he had created by the conquest of Roanoke Island. Two days later, Elizabeth City, North Carolina was in Union hands. New Bern, North Carolina fell on March 14. Beaufort, North Carolina was captured by the end of April. Southfield played a major role in these Union conquests.

=== Peninsula Campaign, 1862 ===
Late in May, her effort in behalf of the Union cause in North Carolina was interrupted by General George McClellan's request for more naval assistance in his drive up the peninsula from Fort Monroe toward Richmond, Virginia. Southfield arrived at Hampton Roads on June 2 and devoted most of the summer to operations on the York and James Rivers which form the peninsula. At the end of August, after McClellan had evacuated his army, the double-ender was sent to the Norfolk Navy Yard for badly needed repairs before returning to the North Carolina sounds.

=== Battle of Washington, 1863 ===
Back in fighting trim, Southfield departed Hampton Roads on December 2, arrived at Hatteras Inlet the next day, and proceeded to Plymouth, North Carolina. On the morning of December 10, she engaged a Confederate land force which attacked that city. A Southern shot pierced her steam chest, disabling her engine and filling the ship with hot steam. The scalding vapor prevented the gunboat's crew from reaching her magazine and thus made it impossible for her guns to continue their fire. Boats were lowered to pull the disabled ship downstream; but USS Commodore Perry, hearing the firing, steamed up, took Southfield in tow, and returned with her to Plymouth. By that time, the Confederate raiders had withdrawn.

On the last day of March 1863, Confederate troops attacked and besieged the Union garrison at Washington, North Carolina. Southfield was ordered from Plymouth to the scene of the action where she engaged the investing forces. She and other Union gunboats also carried supplies through the blockade to sustain the beleaguered Northern troops, finally forcing the Southern attackers to withdraw on April 16.

The next day, Southfield headed back for Plymouth and, for the following year of relative quiet in the sounds of North Carolina, labored to protect the Union's tenuous hold on the region.

=== Battle of Plymouth, 1864 ===
In February 1864, Confederate forces attacked New Bern and captured the gunboat USS Underwriter. On the first day of March, Southfield and tinclad USS Whitehead ascended the Chowan River to assist Army steamer USS Bombshell, which had been cut off by Confederates above Petty Shore. On March 2, they shelled the Southern batteries, enabling Bombshell to dash down to safety.

The air was rife with rumors that Rebel ironclad ram CSS Albemarle was ready to descend the Roanoke River to destroy the Union warships in the sounds. On the afternoon of April 17, Confederate ground forces attacked Plymouth with artillery and musketry. The Union gunboats in the vicinity helped to defend the town for the remainder of the day and throughout the next.

That night, in anticipation of an attack by Albemarle, Southfield was brought alongside USS Miami, and the two ships were lashed together for mutual protection and concentration of firepower. Before dawn on the morning of April 19, Albemarle emerged from the Roanoke. Miami and Southfield raced toward her. When the three ships collided, the ram scraped across Miami's bow, smashed through Southfield's starboard side, and pierced the wooden gunboat's boiler. For a moment, both Miami and Albemarle were entangled with the fatally wounded double-ender. The forward ropes which had lashed Southfield to Miami were snapped by the collision, and the aft lines were cut by Miami's crew. Albemarle had a harder time extricating herself from her bested and rapidly sinking adversary.

Before she could pull free from the wreck by backing her engines, the ram had taken on so much water that her forward deck was too far depressed to permit her to overtake Miami or to let her guns open fire on the departing side-wheeler. Thus, in sinking, Southfield saved her consort.
