= 14th Regiment Heavy Artillery U.S. Colored Troops =

14th U.S. Colored Heavy Artillery Regiment 1st North Carolina Colored Heavy Artillery Regiment
- National flag of the regiment
- Active: 1864–1865
- Country: United States of America
- Branch: Union Army; US Colored Troops
- Type: Heavy Artillery
- Engagements: American Civil War

The 14th United States Colored Heavy Artillery Regiment, initially designated as the 1st North Carolina Colored Heavy Artillery Regiment was a unit of African-American troops recruited from North Carolina that served in the Union Army during the later stages of the American Civil War.

== Unit history ==
Coastal North Carolina had been occupied by Union troops since 1862, but control of this region was threatened by Confederate advances in 1864. In February of that year Southern forces attacked New Bern, and although they were repulsed, this offensive led Union commanders to consider reinforcing the coastal region with new artillery regiments. Recruitment of Black troops for a new unit, initially designated as the 1st North Carolina Colored Heavy Artillery Regiment, commenced in March, 1864. Most African-American artillery troops in the Civil War were assigned to heavy artillery units, meaning they manned cannons built within fixed fortifications, rather than mobile field artillery. The officers of the new regiment were drawn from white Northern artillery units based in North Carolina, led by Major Thorndike C. Jameson of the 5th Rhode Island Heavy Artillery.

The 1st North Carolina Colored Artillery did not see combat, and it was mainly assigned to garrison forts, act as provost guards, and perform fatigue duty building fortifications. Recruiting officers offered cash bounties to men who enlisted in the regiment, and since the artillery would be stationed near the home region of many Black North Carolina enlistees rather than being deployed to Virginia, this regiment was an attractive proposition for soldiers seeking to support their families.

In late 1864, the regiment was stationed at Morehead City and assigned to logistics duties, loading and unloading cargo in support of Union operations during the Carolinas campaign. To bolster these efforts, the regiment was expanded from four to twelve companies. The name of the regiment was changed to the 14th Heavy Artillery, United States Colored Troops, in March 1865, and following the end of the war it was mustered out of service in December, 1865.

== Commanders ==
Commanding officers of the 14th US Colored Heavy Artillery Regiment:

- Lieutenant Colonel Walter S. Poor
- Major Thorndike C. Jameson, dismissed 1864.

== See also ==
- List of United States Colored Troops Civil War units
