= Robert Hoke =

Confederate Army general (1837–1912)

Robert F. Hoke
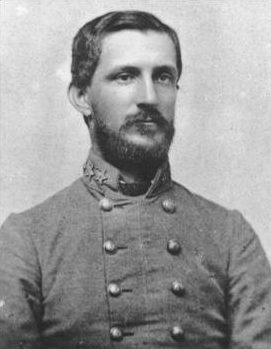
- Robert Frederick Hoke photo taken in 1862
- Born: May 27, 1837; Lincolnton, North Carolina, U.S.
- Died: July 3, 1912 (aged 75); Raleigh, North Carolina, U.S.
- Burial place: Historic Oakwood Cemetery
- Military career
- Allegiance: Confederate States of America
- Branch: Confederate States Army
- Service years: 1861-1865
- Rank: Major General
- Conflicts: American Civil War: Battle of Big Bethel; Battle of New Bern; Peninsula Campaign; Northern Virginia Campaign; Second Battle of Bull Run; Battle of Antietam; Battle of Chancellorsville; Battle of Plymouth; Siege of Petersburg; Battle of Cold Harbor; Carolinas campaign; Battle of Bentonville
- Other work: iron mine manager then chairman, water company president, real estate agent, railroad president

Robert Frederick Hoke (May 27, 1837 – July 3, 1912) was a Confederate major general during the American Civil War. He was present at one of the earliest battles, the Battle of Big Bethel, where he was commended for coolness and judgment. Wounded at Chancellorsville, he recovered in time for the defense of Petersburg and Richmond. His brigade distinguished itself at the Battle of Cold Harbor. Hoke was later a businessman and railroad executive.

== Early life and career ==
Robert Frederick Hoke was born in Lincolnton, North Carolina, the son of Michael and Frances Burton Hoke. He had a younger sister Mary. Their father was a lawyer, orator, and unsuccessful Democratic nominee for Governor of North Carolina in 1844. Michael Hoke died shortly after losing that election. His death "had lasting effects" on Robert Hoke's political viewpoint.

The son disliked politics and avoided involvement, later rejecting the offer of the governor's position. Robert Hoke was educated at the Pleasant Retreat Academy. He next studied at the Kentucky Military Institute, graduating in 1854. Hoke returned to Lincolnton, where he managed various family business interests for his widowed mother, including a cotton mill and iron works.

== Civil War service ==
=== 1861–63 ===
With North Carolina's secession from the Union, Hoke at age 24 enlisted in Company K of the 1st North Carolina Infantry Regiment (6 months) and was commissioned as a second lieutenant. Within months, he was promoted to captain and was commended for "coolness, judgment and efficiency" in D. H. Hill's report of the Battle of Big Bethel. He was subsequently promoted to major in September.

Following the reorganization of the 6-month term North Carolina troops, Hoke was appointed as the lieutenant colonel of the 33rd North Carolina Infantry Regiment. He was cited for his gallantry at the Battle of New Bern in March 1862, where he assumed command of the regiment following the capture of its colonel, C. M. Avery. He led the 33rd throughout the Peninsula Campaign as a part of Lawrence O. Branch's brigade. Hoke was promoted to colonel before the Northern Virginia Campaign and fought at the Second Battle of Bull Run, in addition to the Maryland Campaign at the Battle of Antietam.

Upon Colonel Avery's return from captivity, Hoke was assigned as commander of the 21st North Carolina Infantry Regiment in Isaac Trimble's brigade in Jubal Early's division. Hoke commanded the brigade at the Battle of Fredericksburg and helped repulse an attack by Union forces under Maj. Gen. George G. Meade.

Hoke was promoted to brigadier general on January 17, 1863, and assigned permanent command of Trimble's brigade, which was composed of five North Carolina regiments. He was severely wounded defending Marye's Heights while the majority of the armies fought at the Battle of Chancellorsville and was sent home to recuperate. Command of his brigade passed to Col. Isaac E. Avery. Hoke missed the rest of the year's campaigns.

=== 1864–65 ===
Hoke resumed command of his brigade at Petersburg, Virginia, in January 1864, and led it to North Carolina, where he organized attacks on New Bern and Plymouth. In February, troops under Hoke's command executed twenty two Union soldiers of the 2nd North Carolina Union Volunteer Infantry Regiment by hanging at Kinston, North Carolina. These men had been captured in the Battle of New Bern, and were found to have previously served in North Carolina Partisan Ranger units. General George Pickett ordered that they should be court martialed for desertion from the Confederate Army, and the subsequent hangings were carried out by the 54th Regiment, North Carolina Troops of Hoke's brigade. In the Battle of Plymouth on April 17, Hoke captured a garrison of 2,834 Union soldiers. The Confederate Congress voted May 17 to extend its thanks for the action of Hoke and his men at Plymouth. Hoke was promoted to major general on April 23, 1864 (ranking from April 20), and was given command of what was called Hoke's Division in the Department of North Carolina and Southern Virginia. He and his troops were summoned to Virginia in May when the Union Army of the James threatened Richmond and Petersburg. Given command of six brigades of infantry, Hoke served with distinction in several actions, including the Battle of Cold Harbor, where his division played an important role in stopping several Union attacks.

In December, Hoke's division was sent to North Carolina when the state was threatened by Union forces. Hoke fought at the defense of Fort Fisher on January 13–15, 1865. He also fought in the Carolinas campaign and the Battle of Bentonville, where he repulsed several attacks by forces under Maj. Gen. William T. Sherman before overwhelming numbers began to push the Confederates back.

Hoke surrendered along with Joseph E. Johnston's army at Bennett Place near Durham and was paroled on May 1, 1865. He was pardoned by the U.S. government on June 14, 1865.

== Postbellum activities ==
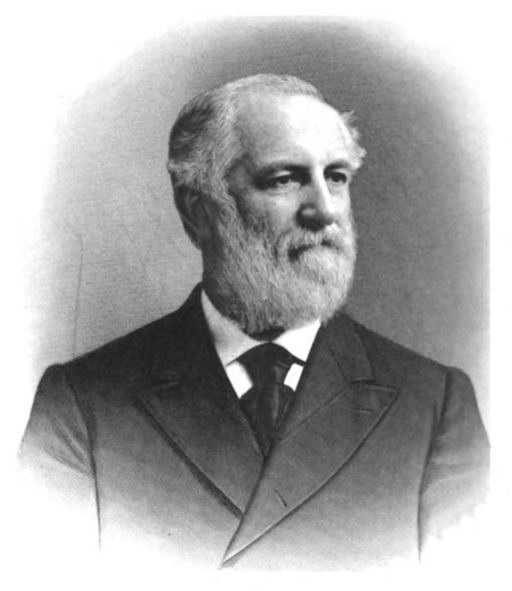
Hoke in later years

=== Marriage and family ===
Hoke developed Northern ties when on January 7, 1869, he married Lydia Van Wyck, who was of a prominent political family from New York City. One of his brothers-in-law, Robert Van Wyck, was Mayor of New York City and another, Augustus Van Wyck, was an unsuccessful candidate for Governor of New York, losing to Theodore Roosevelt.

The Hokes had six children. Their son Michael Hoke became a famous orthopedist in Atlanta, Georgia and a founder of the Shriner's Children Hospital.

=== Later career ===
After the war, Hoke returned to civilian life and engaged in various businesses, including insurance and gold mining. He became principal owner of an iron mine near Chapel Hill, North Carolina, and another one in Mitchell County. He also served as the director of the North Carolina Railroad for many years. Railroad construction was creating new networks across the South, and new opportunities for business.

Hoke owned a resort and a bottled water company at Lithia Springs in Lincoln County. Such areas were popular summer retreats.

With his success in the war and business, politicians tried to recruit Hoke to office, even offering him the position of governor of the state. He declined, having permanently turned away from politics as a child after his father's death. His nephew Hoke Smith served as secretary of the interior, and then as governor and a senator from Georgia.

Hoke died in Raleigh, North Carolina, and was buried with full military honors in Raleigh's Oakwood Cemetery.

== Legacy and honors ==
- Hoke County, North Carolina was named in his honor in 1911.
- The Robert F. Hoke Chapter #78 of the United Daughters of the Confederacy was named for the former general, as was Camp #1616 of the Sons of Confederate Veterans.

== See also ==
- List of American Civil War generals (Confederate)
