= North Carolina in the American Civil War =

Coordinates: 35.5°N 80°W

North Carolina
- Nickname(s): "Tar Heel State"
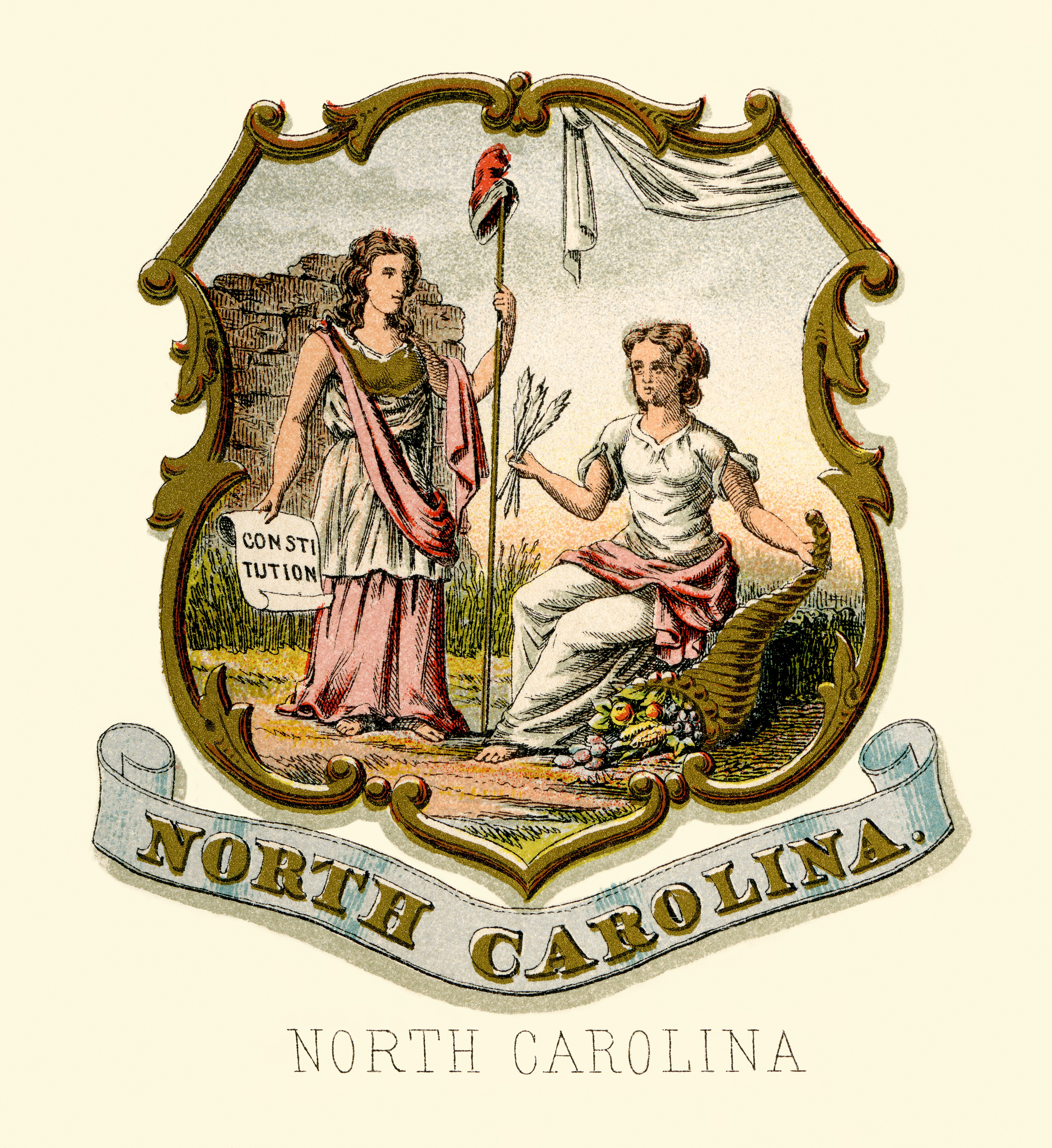
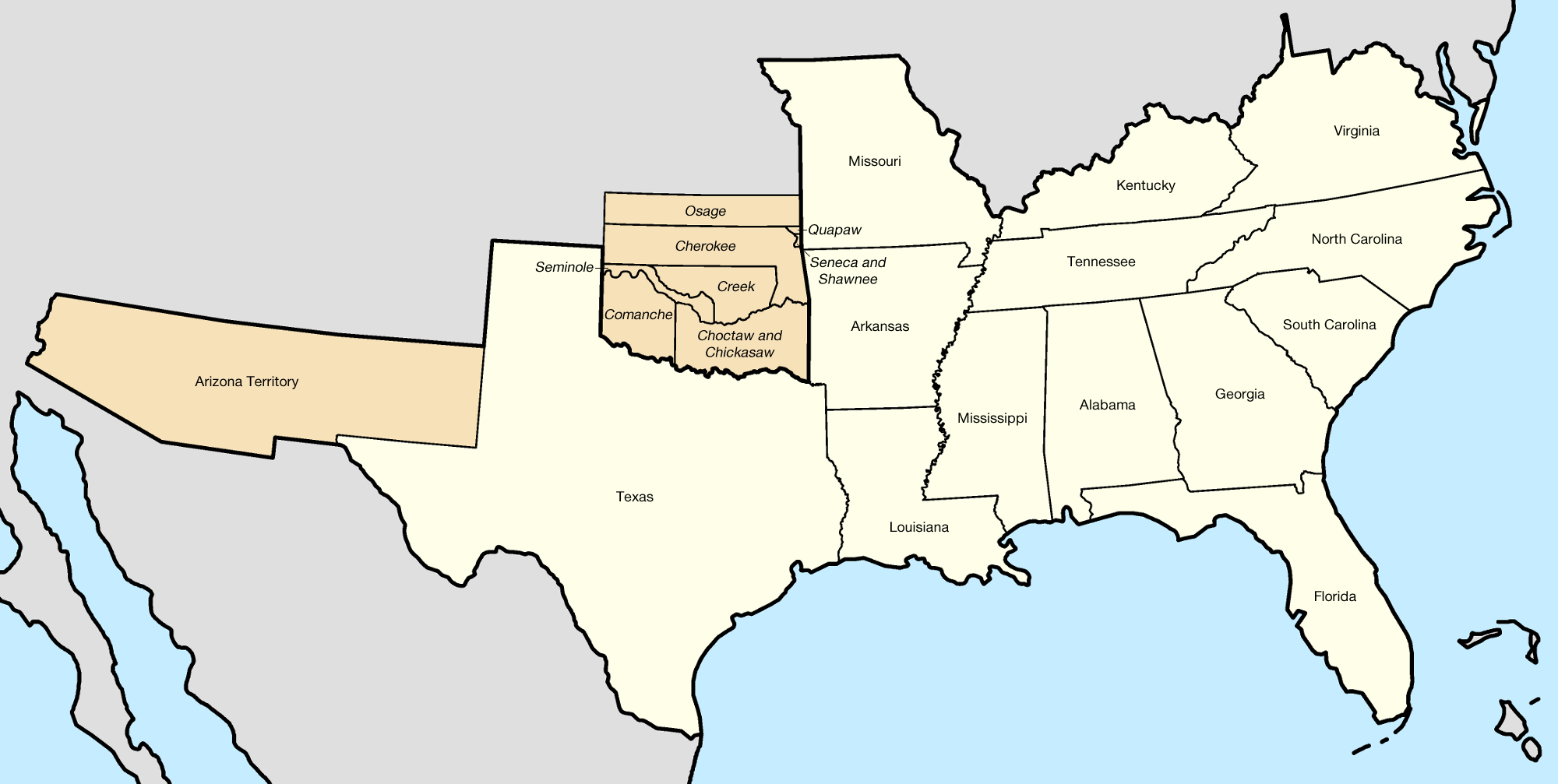
- Flag (1861) Great Seal (1836–1883) Map of the Confederate States
- Capital: Raleigh
- Largest city: Wilmington
- Admitted to the Confederacy: May 21, 1861 (10th)
- Population: 992,622 total; • 661,563 (66.64%) free; • 331,059 (33.36%) slave
- Forces supplied: - Confederate troops: 125,000; Union troops: 15,000 (10,000 white; 5,000 black) total
- Governor: Henry Clark (1861–1862); Zebulon Vance (1862–1865)
- Senators: George Davis (1862–1864); Edwin Reade (1864); William Graham (1864–1865); William Dortch (1862–1865)
- Representatives: List
- Restored to the Union: July 4, 1868

During the American Civil War, North Carolina joined the Confederacy with some reluctance, mainly due to the presence of Southern Unionist sentiment within the state. A popular vote in February 1861 on the issue of secession was won by the unionists but not by a wide margin.

This slight lean in favor of staying in the Union would shift towards the Confederacy in response to Abraham Lincoln's April 15 proclamation that requested 75,000 troops from all Union states, leading to North Carolina's secession. Similar to Arkansas, Tennessee, and Virginia, North Carolina wished to remain uninvolved in the likely war but felt forced to pick a side by the proclamation. Throughout the war, North Carolina widely remained a divided state. The population within the Appalachian Mountains in the western part of the state contained large pockets of Unionism. Even so, North Carolina would help contribute a significant amount of troops to the Confederacy, and channeled many vital supplies through the major port of Wilmington, in defiance of the Union blockade.

Fighting occurred sporadically in the state from September 1861, when Union Major General Ambrose Burnside set about capturing key ports and cities, notably Roanoke Island and New Bern. In 1864, the Confederates assumed the offensive, temporarily reconquering Plymouth, while the Union Army launched several attempts to seize Fort Fisher. The last remaining major Confederate army, under Joseph E. Johnston, surrendered at Bennett Place, near Durham, to William Tecumseh Sherman in April 1865. Troops from North Carolina played major roles in dozens of battles in other states, including Gettysburg, where Tar Heels were prominent in Pickett's Charge.

North Carolina would also raise troops to fight in Union regiments. The 3rd North Carolina Cavalry helped take part in the Battle of Bull's Gap, Battle of Red Banks, and Stoneman's 1864 and 1865 raids in western North Carolina, southwest Virginia, and eastern Tennessee. The Department of North Carolina, established in 1862, seized Wilmington in 1865, then the state's largest city. The North Carolina–based XVIII Corps was also among the largest in the Union Army.

== Origins ==
The great popular heart is not now and never has been in this war. It was a revolution of the politicians, not the people.

— Zebulon Vance, Governor of North Carolina, 1862–1865

In the mid-19th century, North Carolina was a picture of contrasts. On the Coastal Plain, it was largely a plantation state with a long history of slavery. In the more rural and mountainous western part of the state, there were no plantations and few slaves. These differing perspectives showed themselves in the fraught election of 1860 and its aftermath. North Carolina's electoral votes went to Southern Democrat John C. Breckinridge, an adamant supporter of slavery who hoped to extend the "peculiar institution" to the United States' western territories, rather than to the Constitutional Union candidate, John Bell, who carried much of the Upper South. North Carolina (in marked contrast to most of the states that Breckinridge carried) was reluctant to secede from the Union when it became clear that Republican Abraham Lincoln had won the presidential election. North Carolina did not secede until May 20, 1861, after the fall of Fort Sumter in South Carolina, and the secession of the Upper South's bellwether, Virginia. The next day, on May 21, North Carolina was admitted to the Confederate States. The law admitting the state required a presidential proclamation before it was to take effect, which sources say took place on this date; the only primary source found so far is a statement from Jefferson Davis on July 20 stating that the proclamation had been made.

Some white North Carolinians, especially yeoman farmers who owned few or no slaves, felt ambivalently about the Confederacy; draft-dodging, desertion, and tax evasion were common during the Civil War years, especially in the Union-friendly western part of the state. These North Carolinians, often in disagreement with the aristocracy of eastern planters, along with African Americans across the state, helped in numbering around 15,000 troops who served in the Union Army. North Carolina Union troops helped fight to occupy territory in the mountainous regions of North Carolina and Tennessee, as well as the coastal plains of North Carolina, sometimes with troops from other states. Central and Eastern white North Carolinians were often more supportive of the Confederate cause.

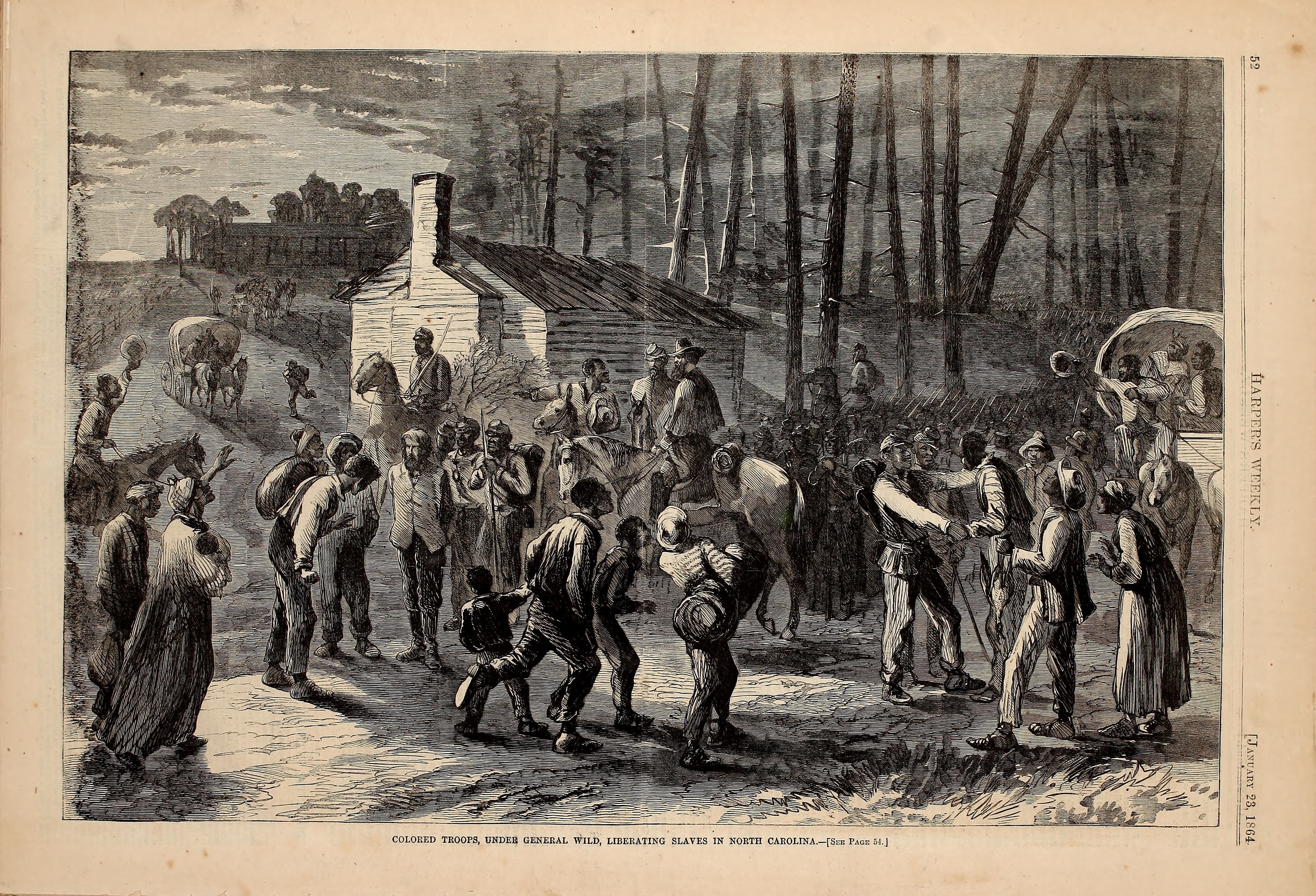
"Colored Troops, Under Gen. Wild, Liberating Slaves in North Carolina" (Harper's Weekly, January 23, 1864)

Initially, the policy of the Confederate populace was to embargo cotton shipments to Europe in hope of forcing them to recognize the Confederacy's independence, thereby allowing trade to resume. The plan failed, and furthermore the Union's naval blockade of Southern ports drastically shrunk North Carolina's international commerce via shipping. Internally, the Confederacy had far fewer railroads than the Union. The breakdown of the Confederate transportation system took a heavy toll on North Carolina residents, as did the runaway inflation of the war years and food shortages in the cities. In the spring of 1863, there were food riots in Salisbury.

=== Tensions and desertions in western North Carolina ===
Although there was little military combat in the Western districts, the psychological tensions grew greater and greater. Historians John C. Inscoe and Gordon B. McKinney argue that in the western mountains "differing ideologies turned into opposing loyalties, and those divisions eventually proved as disruptive as anything imposed by outside armies....As the mountains came to serve as refuges and hiding places for deserters, draft dodgers, escaped slaves, and escaped prisoners of war, the conflict became even more localized and internalized, and at the same time became far messier, less rational, and more mean-spirited, vindictive, and personal" (Inscoe and Mckinney).

== Campaigns in North Carolina ==
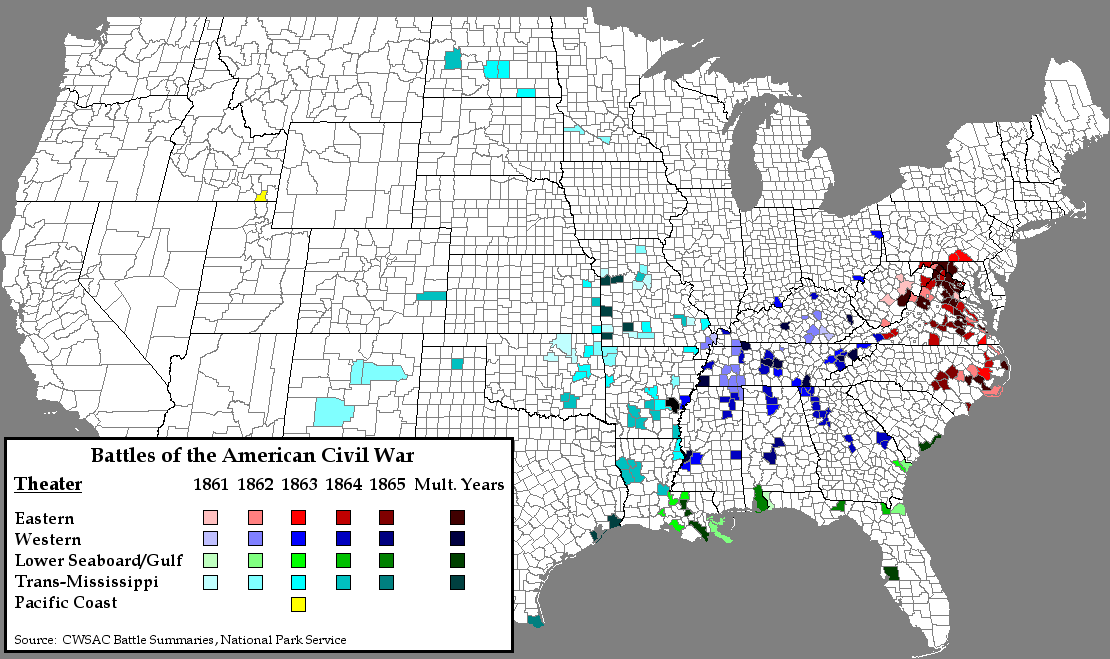
Battles of the Civil War

From September 1861 until July 1862, Union Major General Ambrose Burnside, commander of the Department of North Carolina, formed the North Carolina Expeditionary Corps and set about capturing key ports and cities. His successes at the Battle of Roanoke Island and the Battle of New Bern helped cement Federal control of a part of coastal Carolina.

Fighting continued in North Carolina sporadically throughout the war. In 1864, the Confederates assumed the offensive in North Carolina, trying to recover some of the territory lost to Burnside's expedition. They failed to retake New Bern, but reconquered Plymouth and held it for six months. Moreover, the Union Army launched several attempts to seize Fort Fisher and finally did in 1865. In the war's closing days, a large Federal force under General William Tecumseh Sherman marched into North Carolina, and in a series of movements that became known as the Carolinas campaign, occupied much of the state and defeated the Confederates in several key battles, including Averasborough and Bentonville. The surrender of General Joseph E. Johnston's Confederate army at Bennett Place in April 1865 essentially ended the war in the Eastern Theater.

=== Battles in North Carolina ===
The following are the major battles of the Civil War that were fought in North Carolina:

| Battle | Date | Location | Outcome |
|---|---|---|---|
| Battle of Albemarle Sound | May 5, 1864 | Albemarle Sound | Inconclusive |
| Battle of Averasborough | March 16, 1865 | Harnett and Cumberland Counties | Inconclusive |
| Battle of Bentonville | March 19–21, 1865 | Johnston County | Union victory |
| Battle of Fort Anderson | March 13–16, 1863 | Craven County | Union victory |
| Battle of Fort Fisher I | December 23–27, 1864 | New Hanover County | Confederate victory |
| Battle of Fort Fisher II | January 13–15, 1865 | New Hanover County | Union victory |
| Siege of Fort Macon | March 23, 1862 – Apr 26, 1862 | Carteret County | Union victory |
| Battle of Goldsborough Bridge | December 17, 1862 | Wayne County | Union victory |
| Battle of Hatteras Inlet Batteries | August 28–29, 1861 | Outer Banks | Union victory |
| Battle of Kinston | December 14, 1862 | Lenoir County | Union victory |
| Battle of Monroe's Cross Roads | March 10, 1865 | Hoke County | Inconclusive |
| Battle of Morrisville | April 13–15, 1865 | Wake County | Union victory |
| Battle of New Bern | March 14, 1862 | Craven County | Union victory |
| Battle of Plymouth | April 17–20, 1864 | Washington County | Confederate victory |
| Battle of Roanoke Island | February 7–8, 1862 | Dare County | Union victory |
| Battle of South Mills | April 19, 1862 | Camden County | Confederate victory |
| Battle of Tranter's Creek | June 5, 1862 | Pitt County | Union victory |
| Battle of Washington | March 30, 1863 – April 20, 1863 | Beaufort County | Inconclusive |
| Battle of White Hall | December 16, 1862 | Wayne County | Draw |
| Battle of Wilmington | February 11–22, 1865 | New Hanover County | Union victory |
| Battle of Wyse Fork | March 7–10, 1865 | Lenoir County | Tactical Union victory, Strategic Confederate victory |
| Campaign of the Carolinas | January 1 – April 26, 1865 | North and South Carolina | Decisive Union victory |

== Government and politics ==
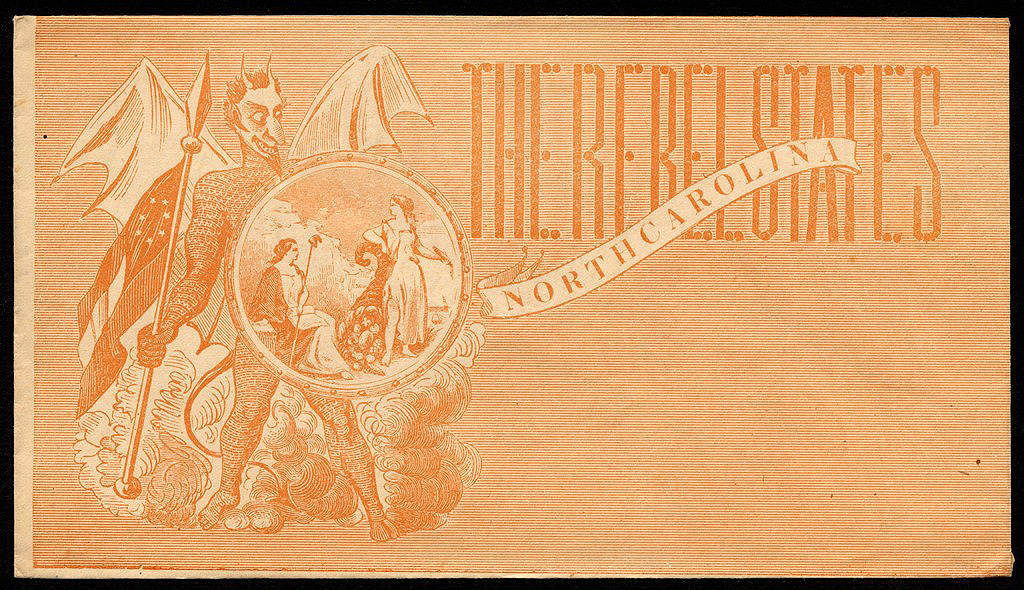
Union propaganda showing North Carolina's Seal being held by the Devil

Governor John Willis Ellis supported the state's secession from the Union in May, 1861, but he died in office shortly afterwards in July. Henry Toole Clark then served as the state's governor until September 1862, declining to run for reelection. Clark founded a Confederate prison in North Carolina, set up European purchasing connections, and built a successful gunpowder mill. His successor Zebulon Vance, a former Confederate colonel, further increased state assistance for the soldiers in the field.

As the war went on, William Woods Holden became a quiet critic of the Confederate government, and a leader of the North Carolina peace movement. In 1864, he was the unsuccessful "peace candidate" against incumbent Governor Vance. Unionists in North Carolina formed a group called the "Heroes of America" that was allied with the United States. Numbering nearly 10,000 men, a few of them possibly black, they helped Southern Unionists escape to U.S. lines.

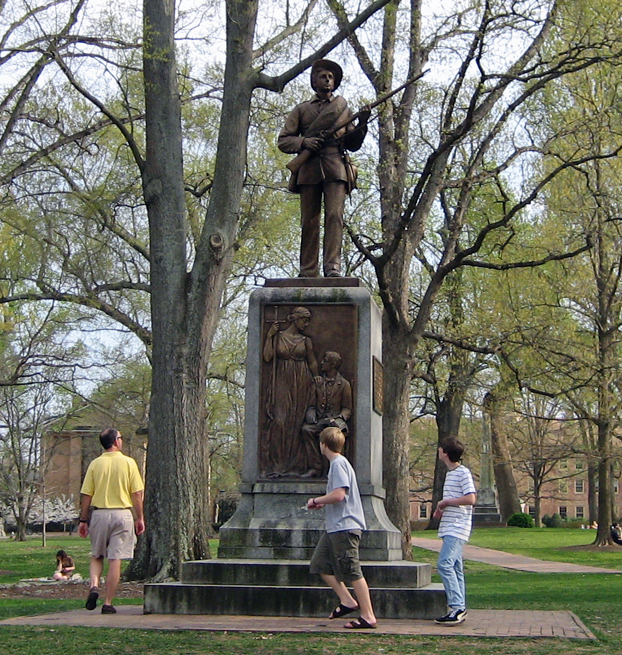
"Silent Sam" Confederate memorial on the University of North Carolina at Chapel Hill campus (now removed)

The North Carolina General Assembly of 1868–1869 ratified the Fourteenth Amendment on July 4, 1868, which readmitted North Carolina to the Union.

== Confederate leaders from North Carolina ==
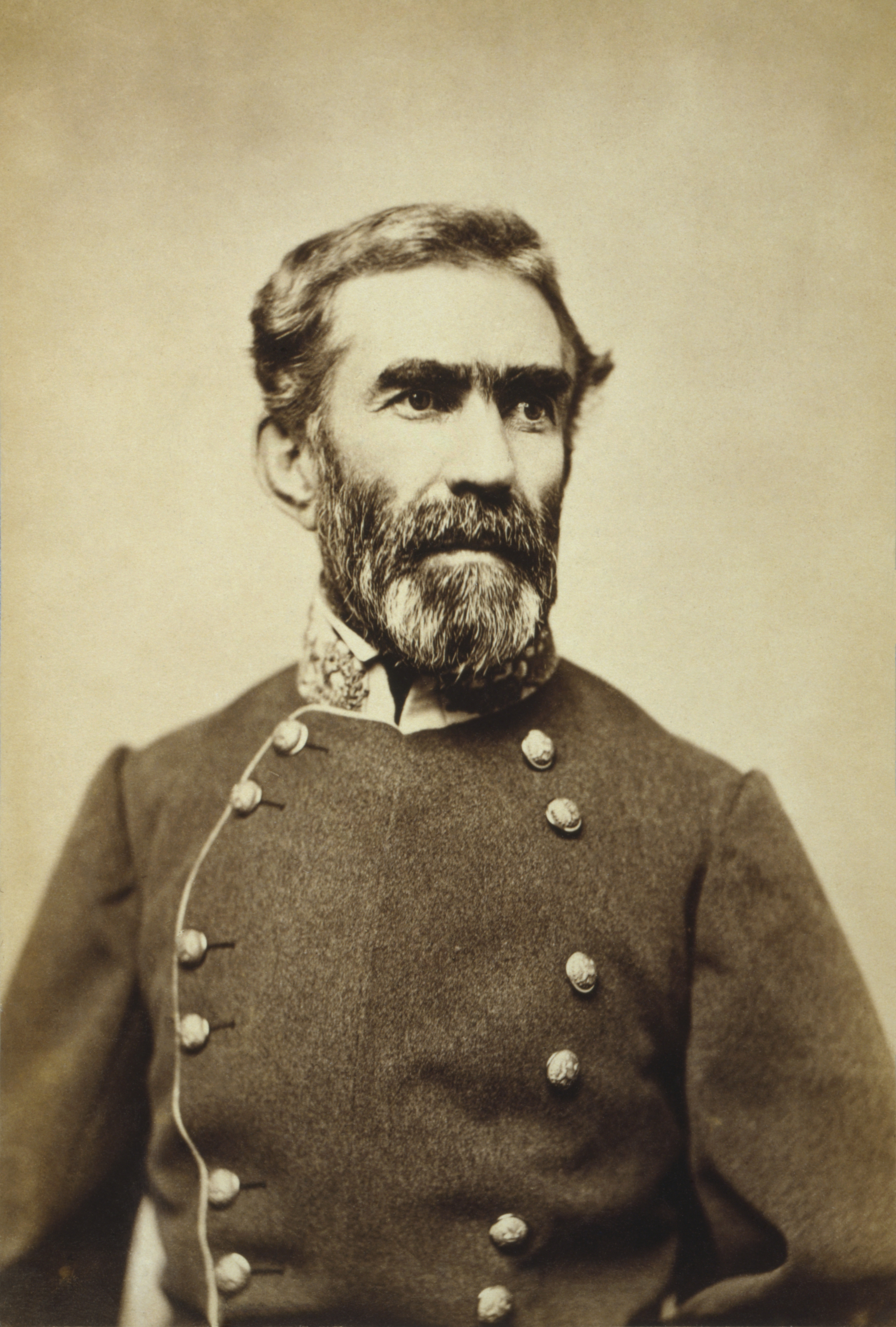
General
Braxton Bragg

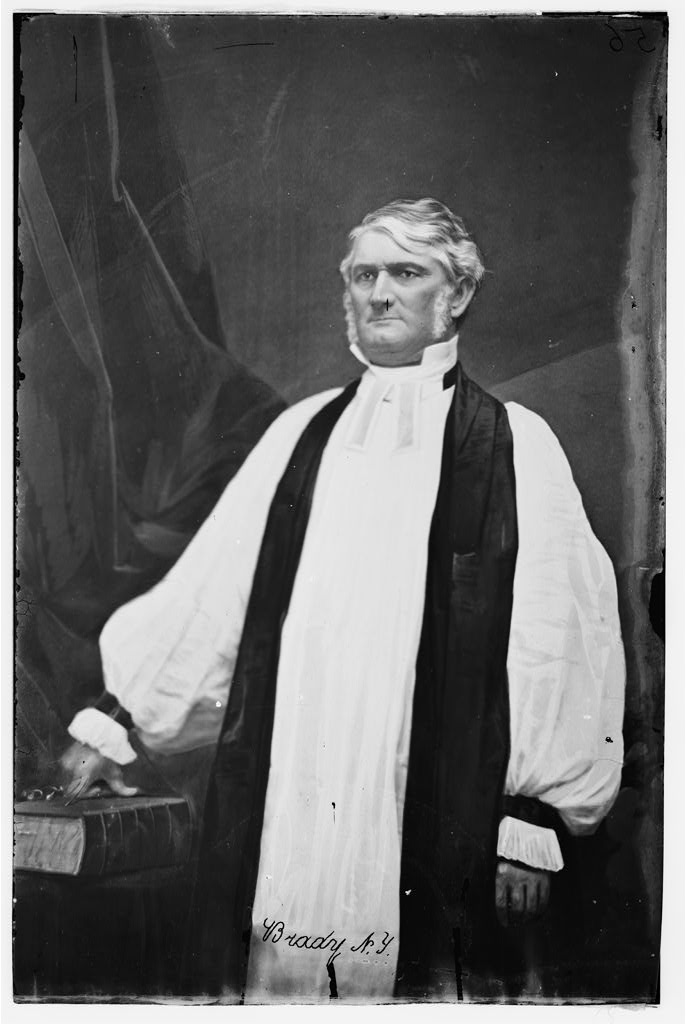
Lt. Gen.
Leonidas Polk

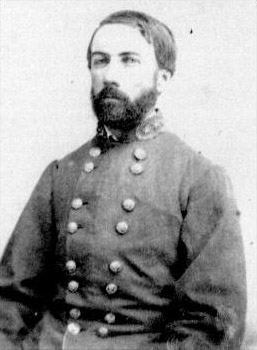
Maj. Gen.
D. H. Hill

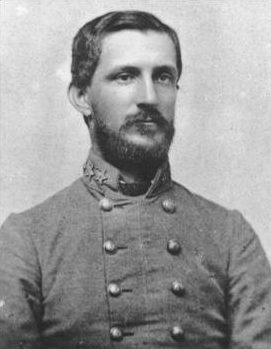
Maj. Gen.
Robert F. Hoke

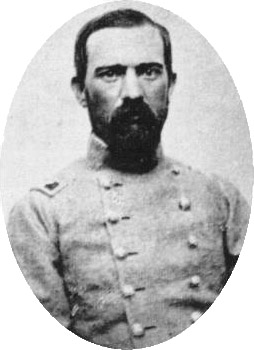
Maj. Gen.
Dorsey Pender

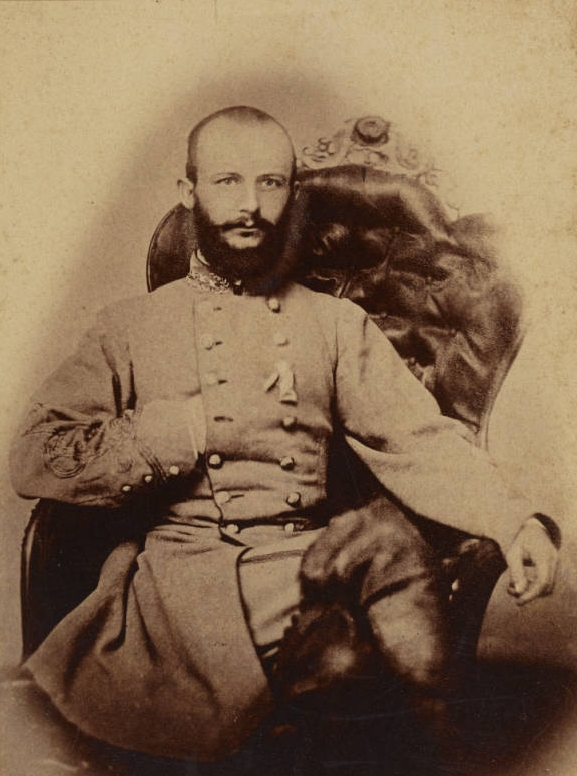
Maj. Gen.
Stephen Dodson Ramseur

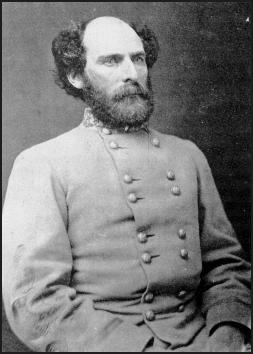
Maj. Gen.
Robert Ransom Jr.

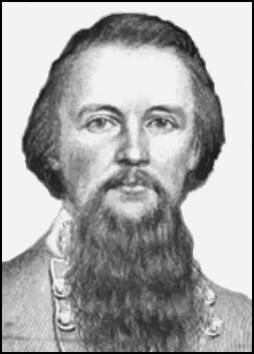
Brig. Gen.
George B. Anderson

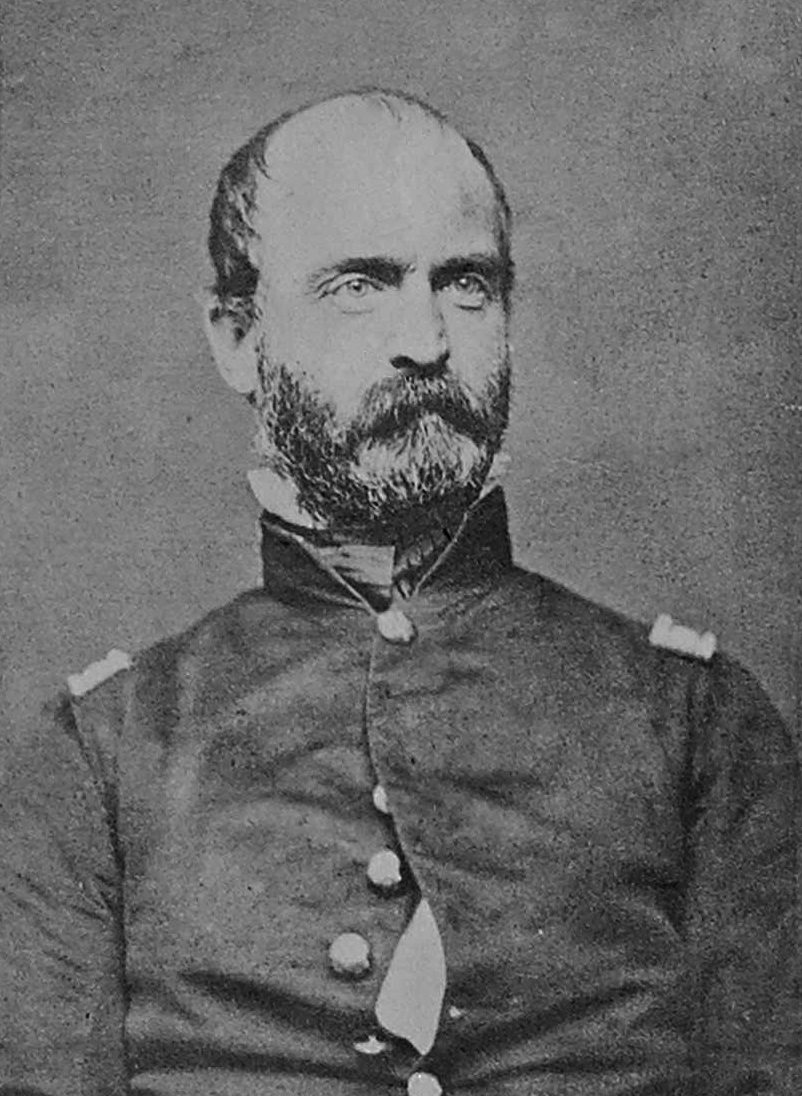
Brig. Gen.
Lewis A. Armistead

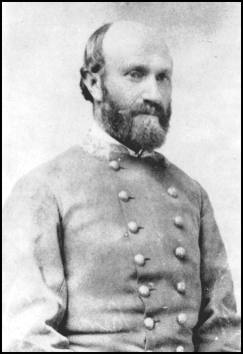
Brig. Gen.
Rufus Barringer

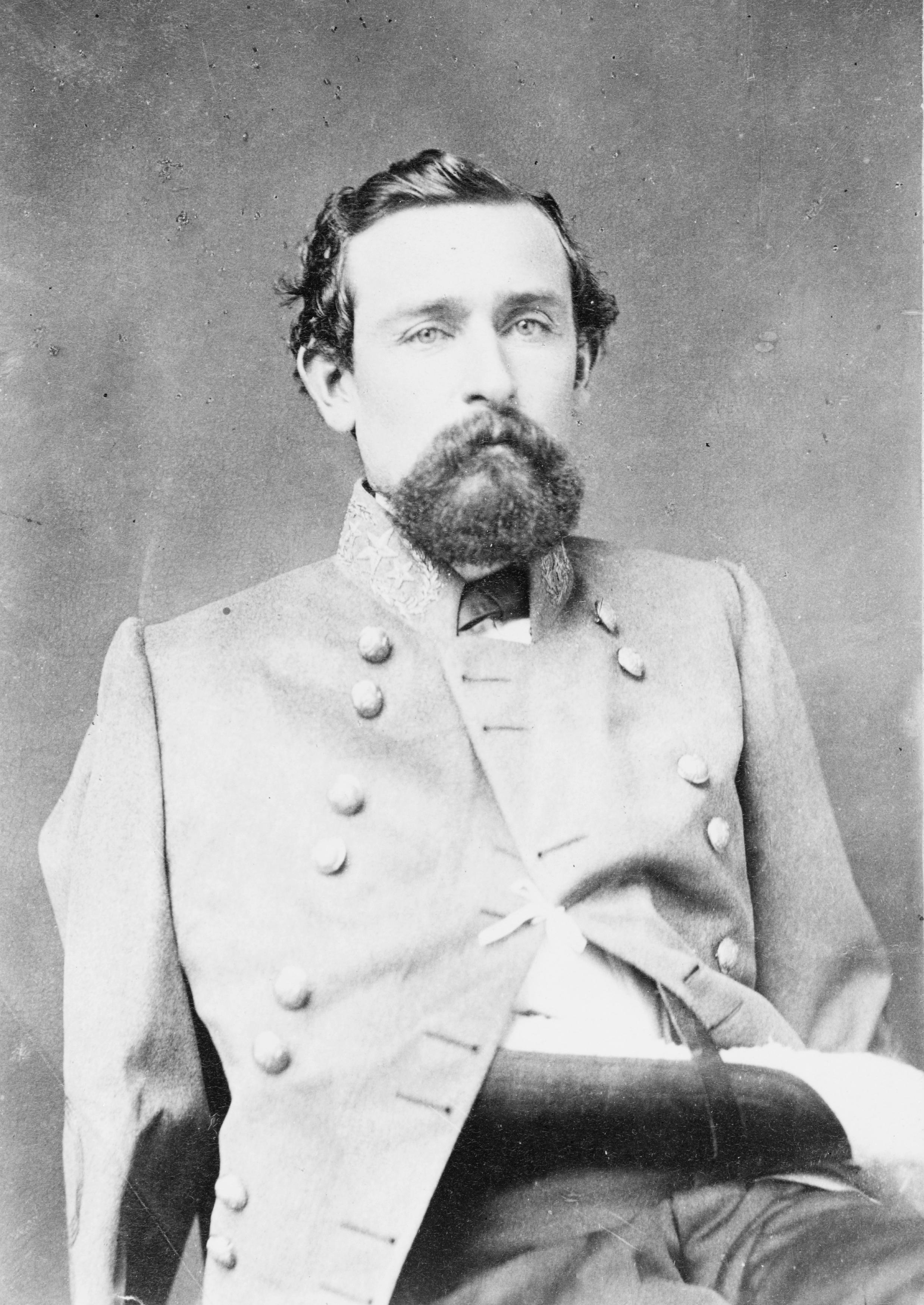
Brig. Gen.
Laurence S. Baker

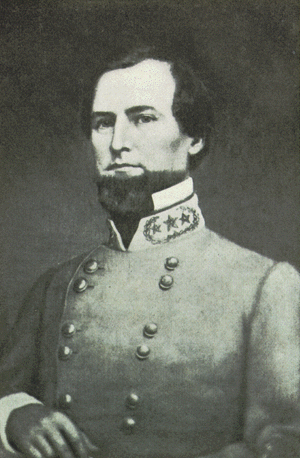
Brig. Gen.
Lawrence O. Branch

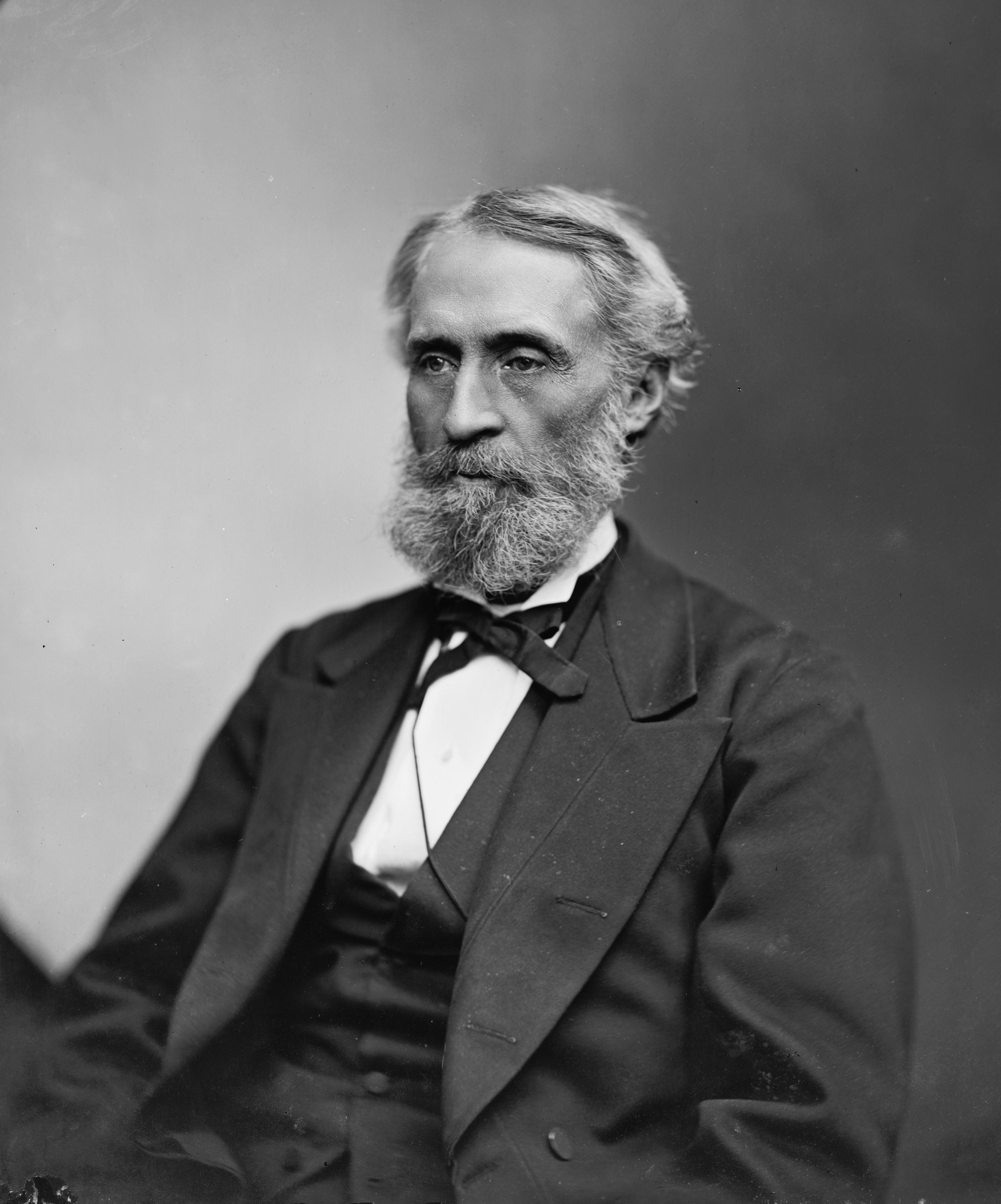
Brig. Gen.
Thomas Lanier Clingman

Brig. Gen.
William Ruffin Cox

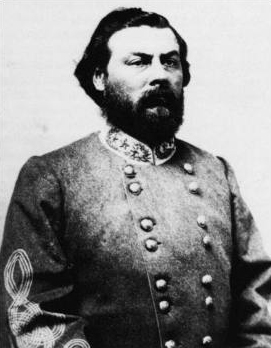
Brig. Gen.
Junius Daniel

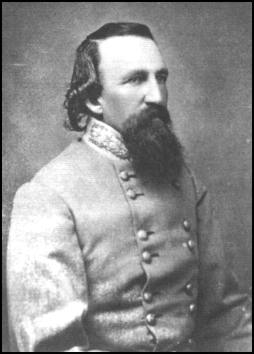
Brig. Gen.
James B. Gordon

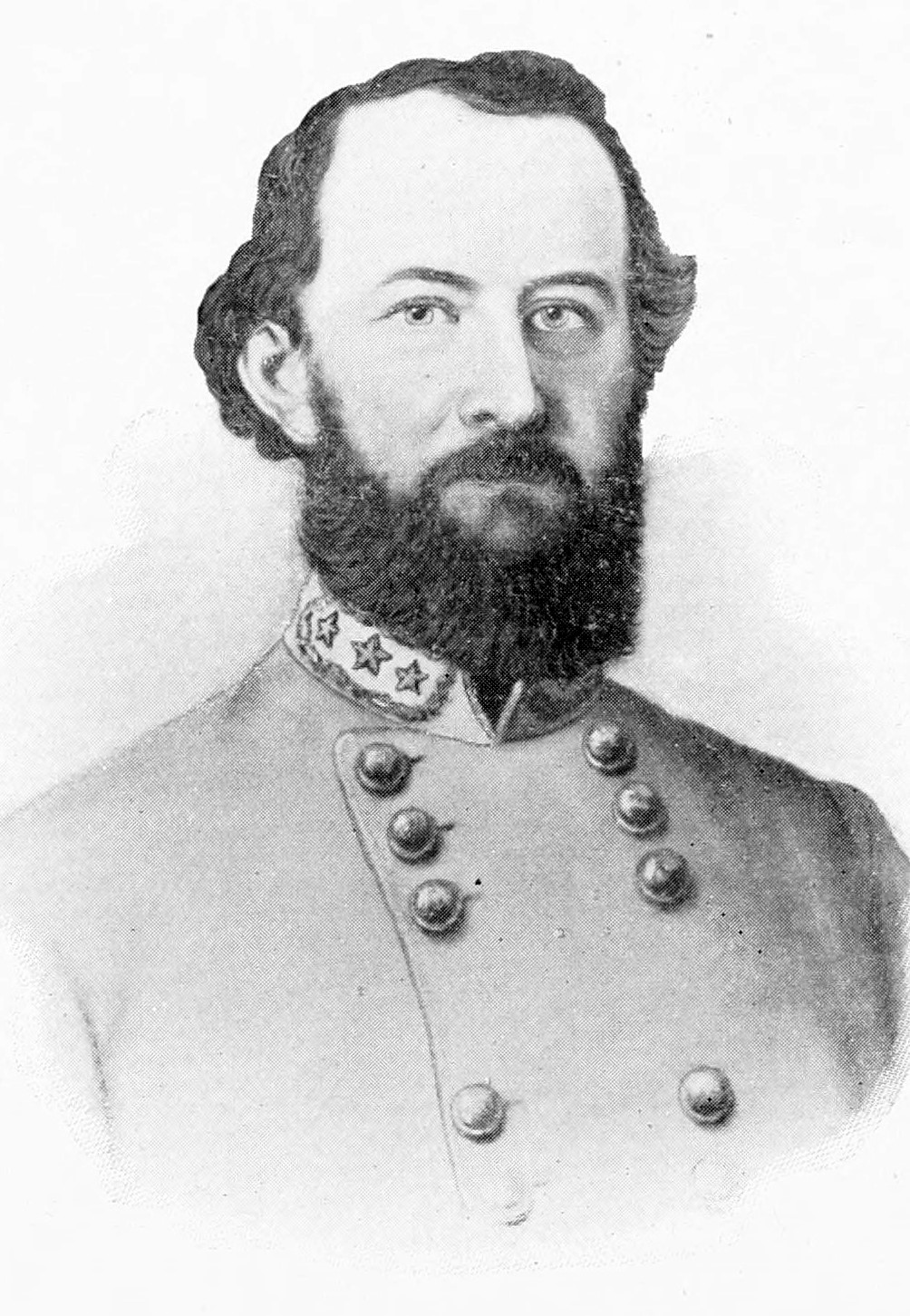
Brig. Gen.
Bryan Grimes

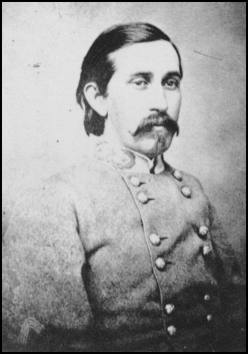
Brig. Gen.
Robert D. Johnston

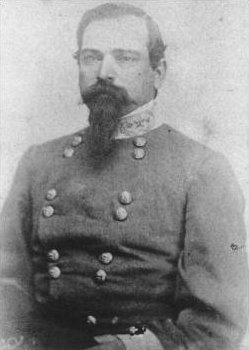
Brig. Gen.
William W. Kirkland

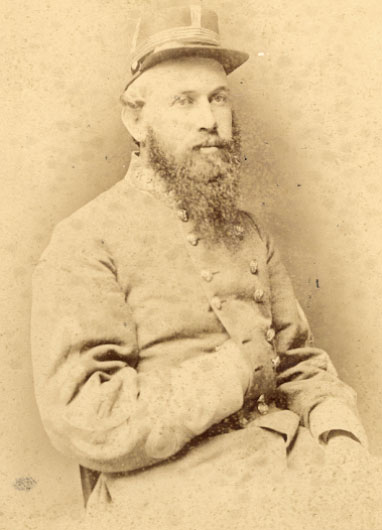
Brig. Gen.
James H. Lane

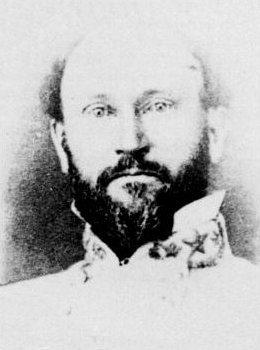
Brig. Gen.
James Green Martin

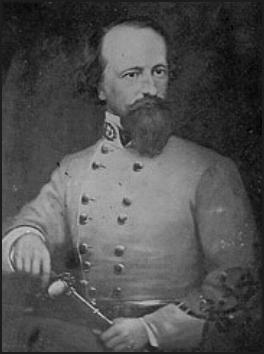
Brig. Gen.
J. Johnston Pettigrew

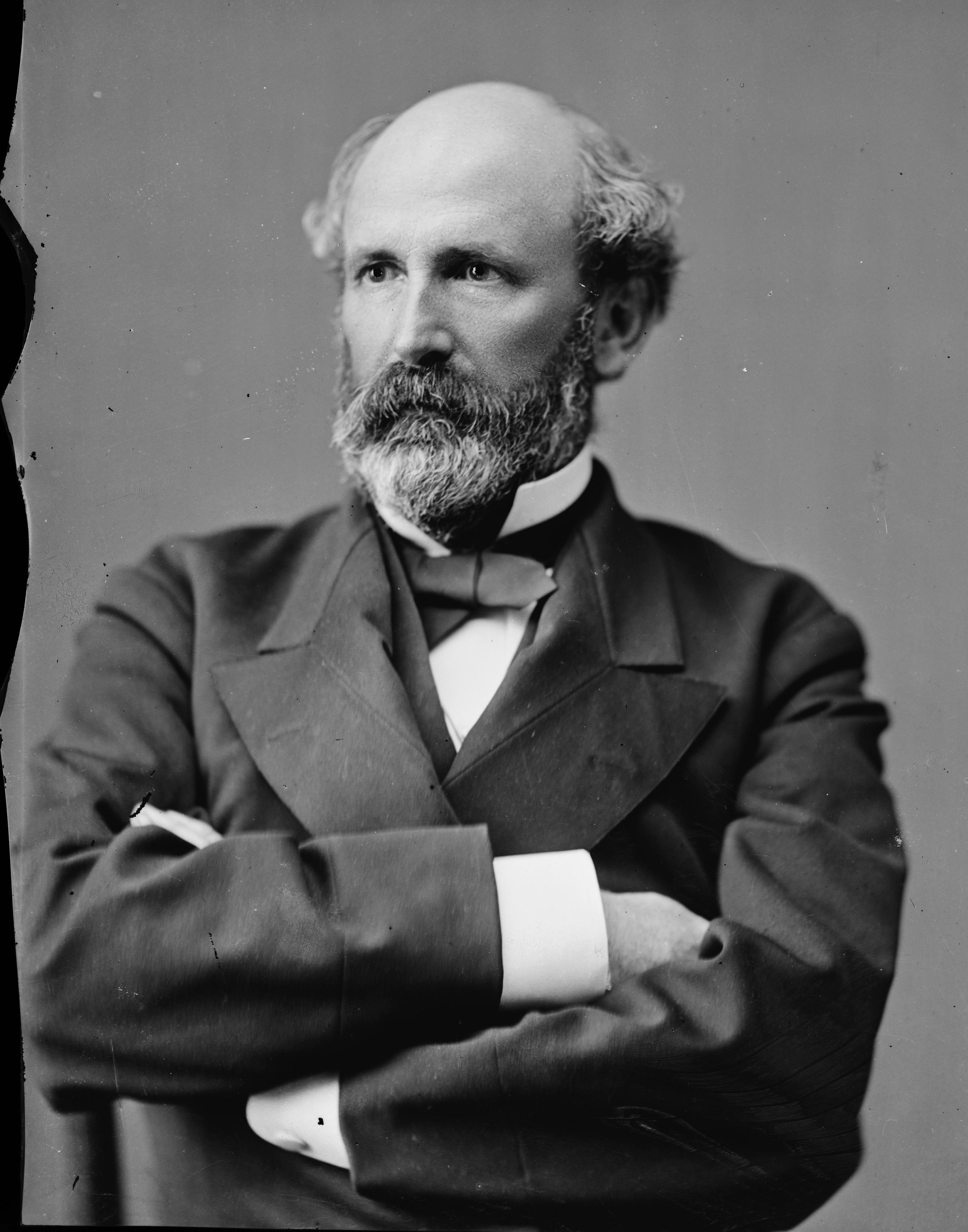
Brig. Gen.
Matt W. Ransom

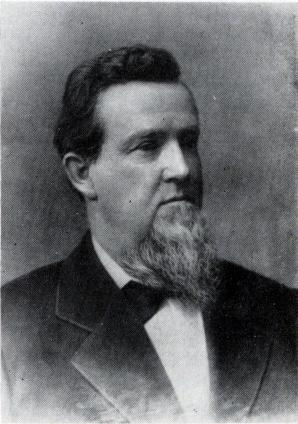
Brig. Gen.
Alfred M. Scales

== Union leaders from North Carolina ==
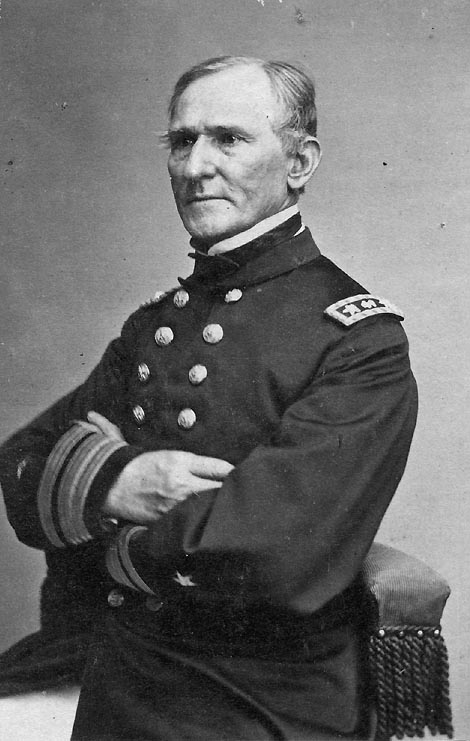
Rdml.
Henry H. Bell

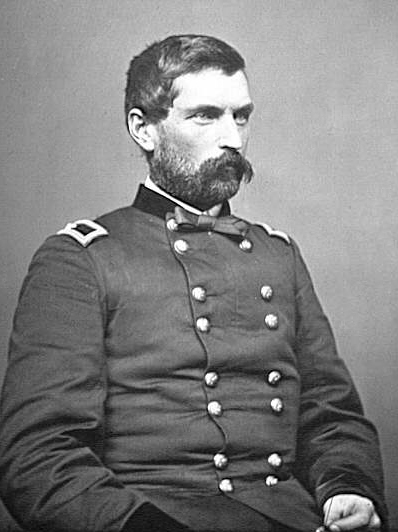
Brig. Gen.
John Gibbon

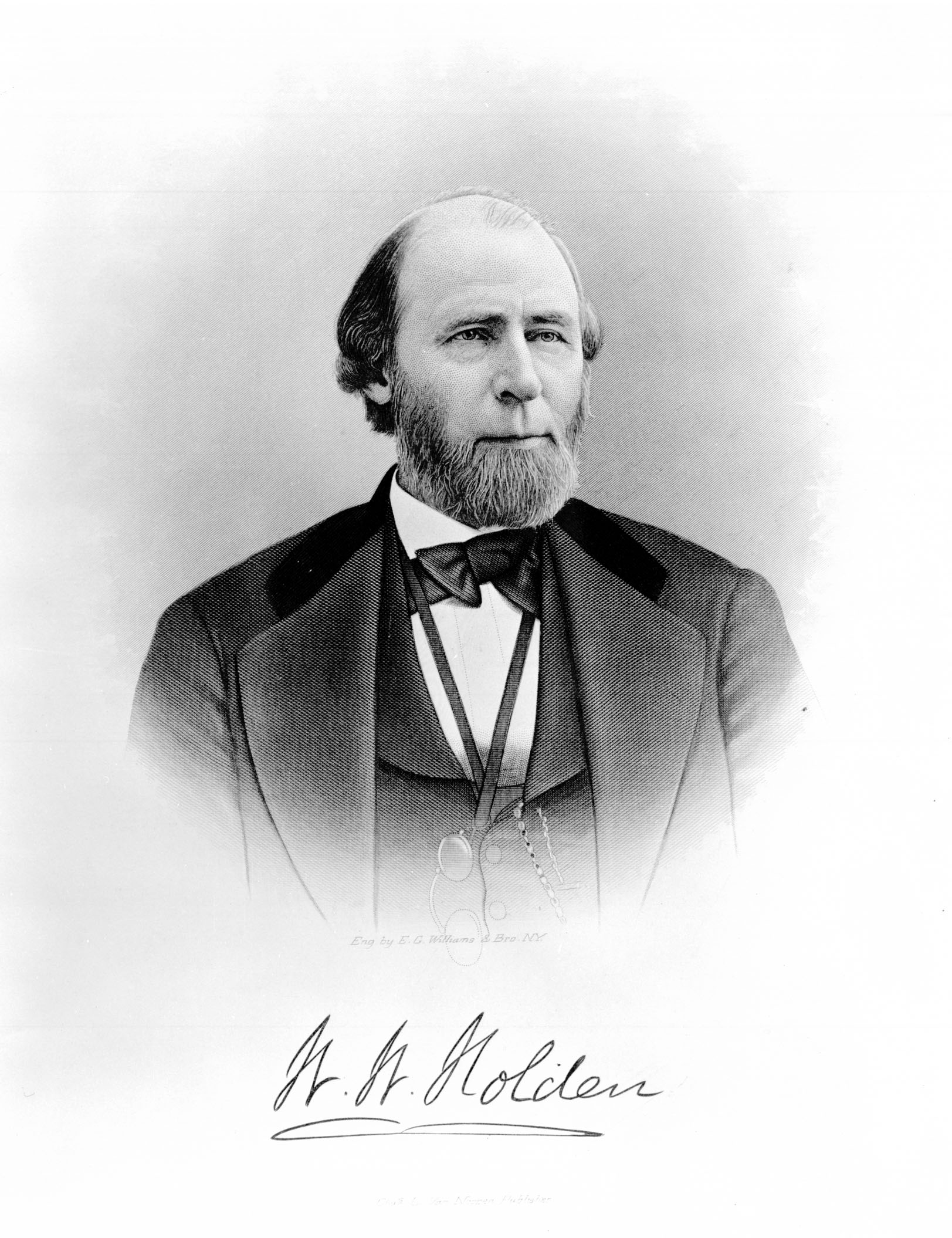
Unionist
William Woods Holden

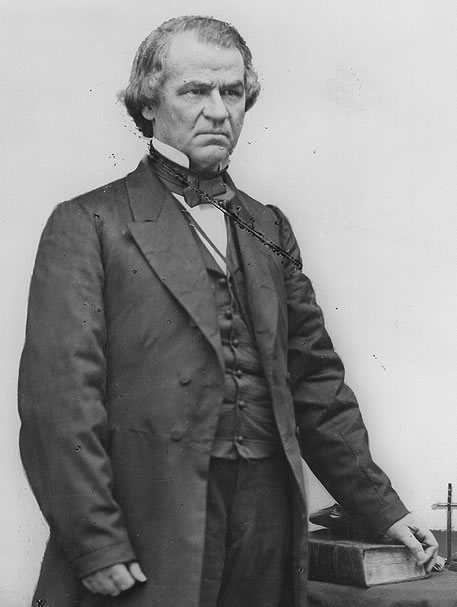
President
Andrew Johnson

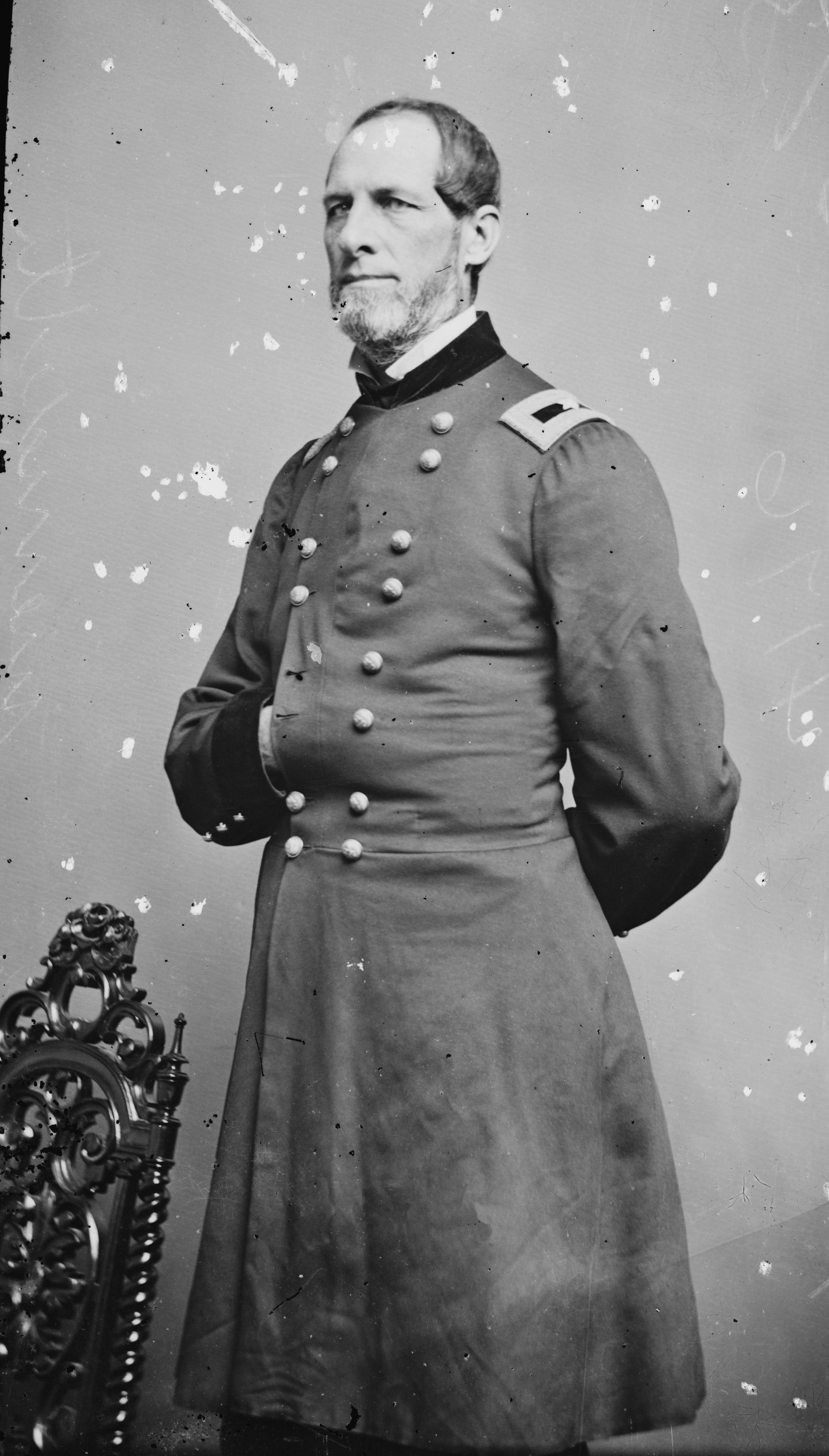
Brig. Gen.
Solomon Meredith

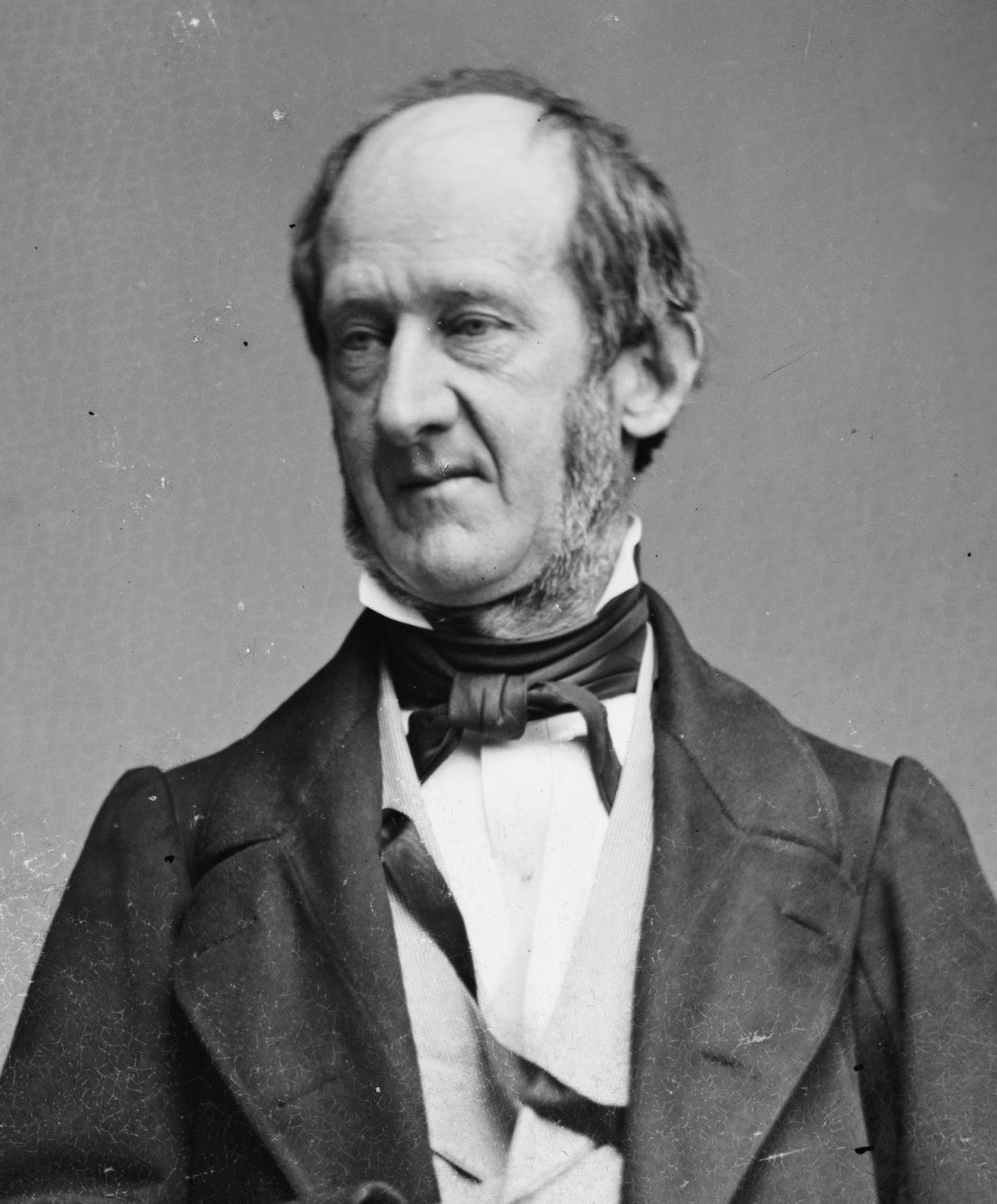
Brig. Gen.
Edward Stanly

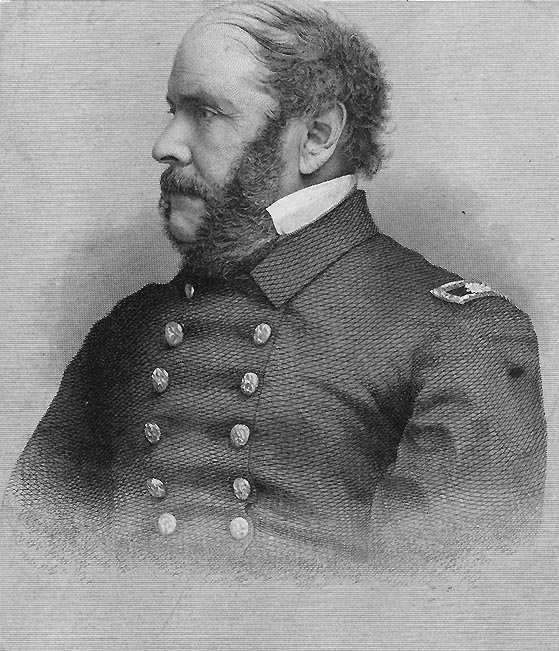
Capt.
John Ancrum Winslow

== North Carolina during Reconstruction ==
Following the end of the Civil War, North Carolina was part of the Second Military District. Major General John M. Schofield was the military leader in charge of North Carolina for roughly a month, in which he implemented a temporary recovery to provide aid to the people of North Carolina. On May 29, 1865, President Andrew Johnson proclaimed the appointment of William W. Holden, as the provisional governor of North Carolina. President Johnson's appointment also allowed North Carolina to set up a state convention to rejoin the union, which required the convention to declare the secession null, abolish slavery, and take an amnesty oath. There would still be a military governor, in the form of Schofield's replacement, Brigadier General Thomas H. Ruger, who would try to cooperate with Holden, such as the removal of most African American soldiers from North Carolina. On July 22, 1868, after multiple other military leaders, the period of military power over North Carolina ended, marking the end of military reconstruction for North Carolina and the Second Military District.

== See also ==
- Campaign of the Carolinas
- List of American Civil War battles
- List of North Carolina Confederate Civil War units
- List of North Carolina Union Civil War regiments
- History of slavery in North Carolina

| Preceded by Arkansas | List of C.S. states by date of admission to the Confederacy; Admitted on May 20, 1861 (10th) | Succeeded by Tennessee |
