= Battle of Plymouth (1864) =

Battle of the American Civil War in North Carolina

Coordinates: 35.86648°N 76.7519°W

- Part of the American Civil War
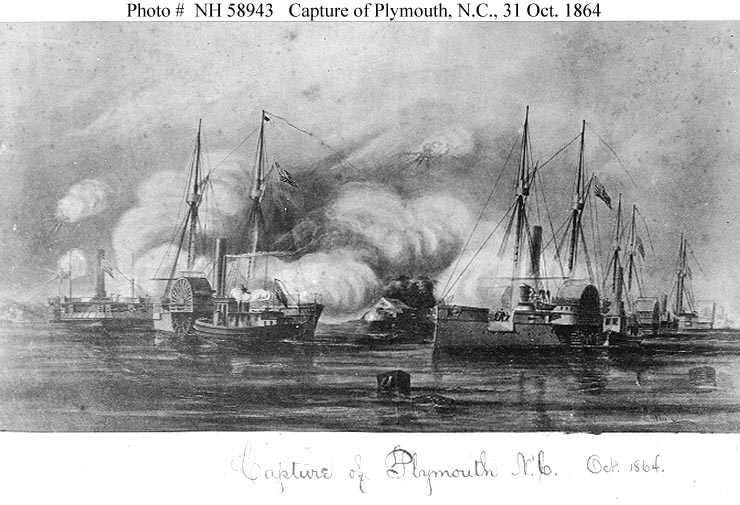
Date	April 17, 1864 – April 20, 1864
Location	Washington County, North Carolina, C.S.
Result	Confederate victory

Belligerents
United States (Union)	Confederate States

Commanders and leaders
Henry W. Wessells (surrendered); Charles W. Flusser †	Robert F. Hoke

Units involved
Plymouth Garrison	Hoke's Division

Strength
2,500	4,500

Casualties and losses
2,000 one ship sunk one ship damaged	800

The Battle of Plymouth was an engagement during the American Civil War that was fought from April 17 through April 20, 1864, in the city of Plymouth and surrounding Washington County, North Carolina.

== Battle ==
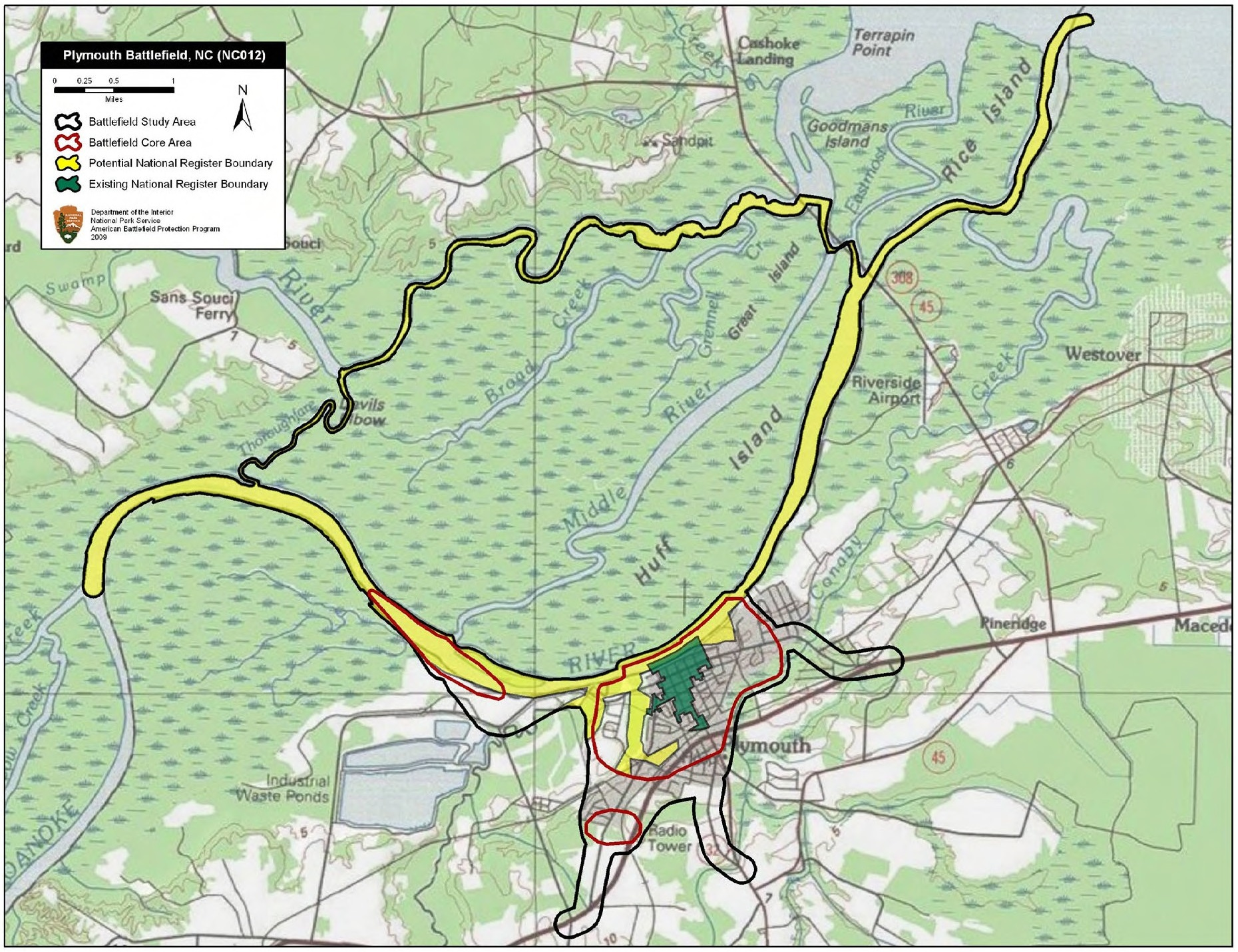
Map of Plymouth Battlefield core and study areas by the American Battlefield Protection Program.

In a combined operation with the ironclad ram CSS Albemarle, Confederate forces under Maj. Gen. Robert F. Hoke, attacked the Federal garrison at Plymouth, North Carolina, on April 17. On April 19, the ram appeared in the river, sinking the USS Southfield, damaging the USS Miami, and driving off the other Union Navy ships supporting the Plymouth garrison. Confederate forces captured Fort Comfort, driving defenders into Fort Williams. On April 20, the garrison surrendered.

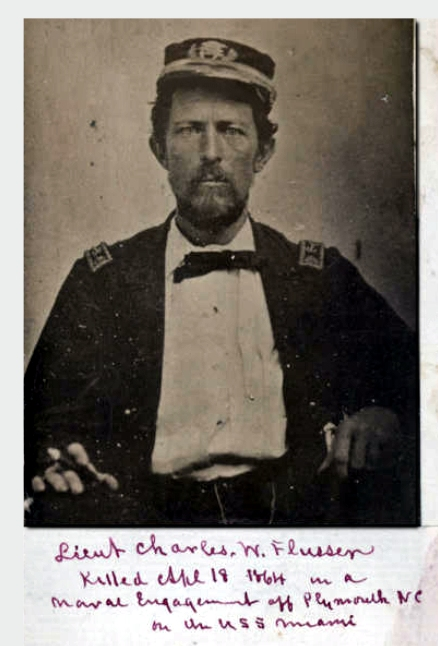
"Lieut Charles W. Flusser. Killed April 19, 1864 in a naval engagement off Plymouth NC on the USS Miami"

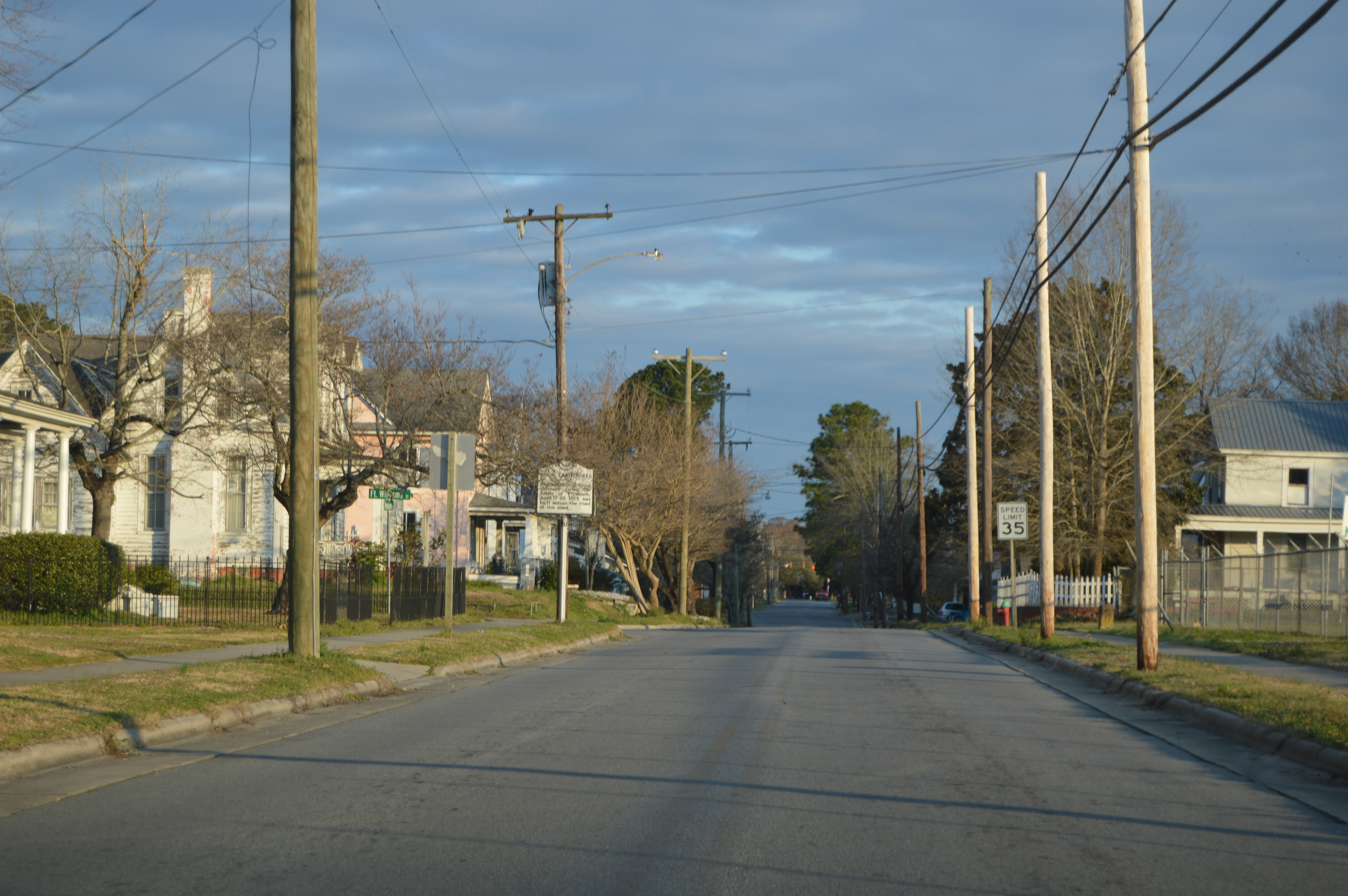
Site of Union earthworks on Washington Street

Plymouth citizens are believed to have taken refuge in the basement of the Latham House during the Battle of Plymouth.

== Aftermath ==
As the possibility of surrender grew imminent, several federal soldiers, fearing harsh treatment at the hands of Confederate captors, mounted intensive efforts to escape. One took a canoe down river and was rescued by steamer a week after the battle, while others hid in surrounding swamps and lowlands before sneaking back to Union lines. Others changed their identities to those of deceased federal soldiers who bore no connection to North Carolina. Most of the captured enlisted men were sent to Andersonville Prison, where many later died.

== Order of battle ==
=== Union forces ===
Plymouth Garrison: Brig. Gen. Henry W. Wessells

- 1st North Carolina Infantry (Union)
- 2nd North Carolina Infantry (Union)
- 101st Pennsylvania Infantry
- 103rd Pennsylvania Infantry
- 16th Connecticut Infantry
- 85th New York Infantry
- 10th US Colored Infantry
- 37th US Colored Infantry
- 2nd US Colored Cavalry
- 12th New York Cavalry
- 2nd Massachusetts Heavy Artillery
- 24th New York Independent Battery

Naval: Lt. Cdr. Charles W. Flusser (k)

- USS Miami
- USS Southfield
- USS Ceres
- USS Whitehead
- USS Mattabesett
- US Army transport Bombshell

=== Confederate forces ===
Hoke's Division: Brig. Gen. Robert F. Hoke

- Hoke's Brigade: Col. John T. Mercer (k)
  - 6th North Carolina Infantry
  - 21st North Carolina Infantry
  - 43rd North Carolina Infantry
  - 54th North Carolina Infantry
  - 57th North Carolina Infantry
  - 21st Georgia Infantry
- Ransom's Brigade: Brig. Gen. Matt W. Ransom
  - 8th North Carolina Infantry
  - 24th North Carolina Infantry
  - 25th North Carolina Infantry
  - 35th North Carolina Infantry
  - 49th North Carolina Infantry
  - 56th North Carolina Infantry
- Kemper's Brigade: Col. William R. Terry
  - 1st Virginia Infantry
  - 3rd Virginia Infantry
  - 7th Virginia Infantry
  - 11th Virginia Infantry
  - 24th Virginia Infantry

Dearing's Command: Col. James Dearing

- 7th Confederate Cavalry
- Virginia Horse Artillery Battery

Branch's Battalion

- R.G. Pegram's Petersburg (VA) Battery
- M.B. Miller's Washington (LA) Artillery Co. C
- W.D. Bradford's Mississippi Guards Battery

Moseley's Battalion

- Montgomery (Alabama) True Blues Artillery
- Wilmington Light Artillery

Guion's Battalion

- 1st North Carolina Artillery (Companies B, G and H)

Read's Battalion

- 38th Virginia Light Artillery Battalion
  - Fauquier Artillery (Co. A)
  - Richmond Fayette Artillery (Co. B)
  - Blount's Lynchburg Artillery (Co. D)

Naval

- CSS Albemarle: Cdr. James W. Cooke
- CSS Cotton Plant

== Works cited ==
- Browning, Judkin Jay (July 2000). ""Little Souled Mercenaries"? The Buffaloes of Eastern North Carolina during the Civil War". The North Carolina Historical Review. 77 (3): 337–363. JSTOR 23522270.
