= Battle of New Bern (1864) =

Battle of the American Civil War

Coordinates: 35.0428°N 77.0148°W

- Part of the American Civil War
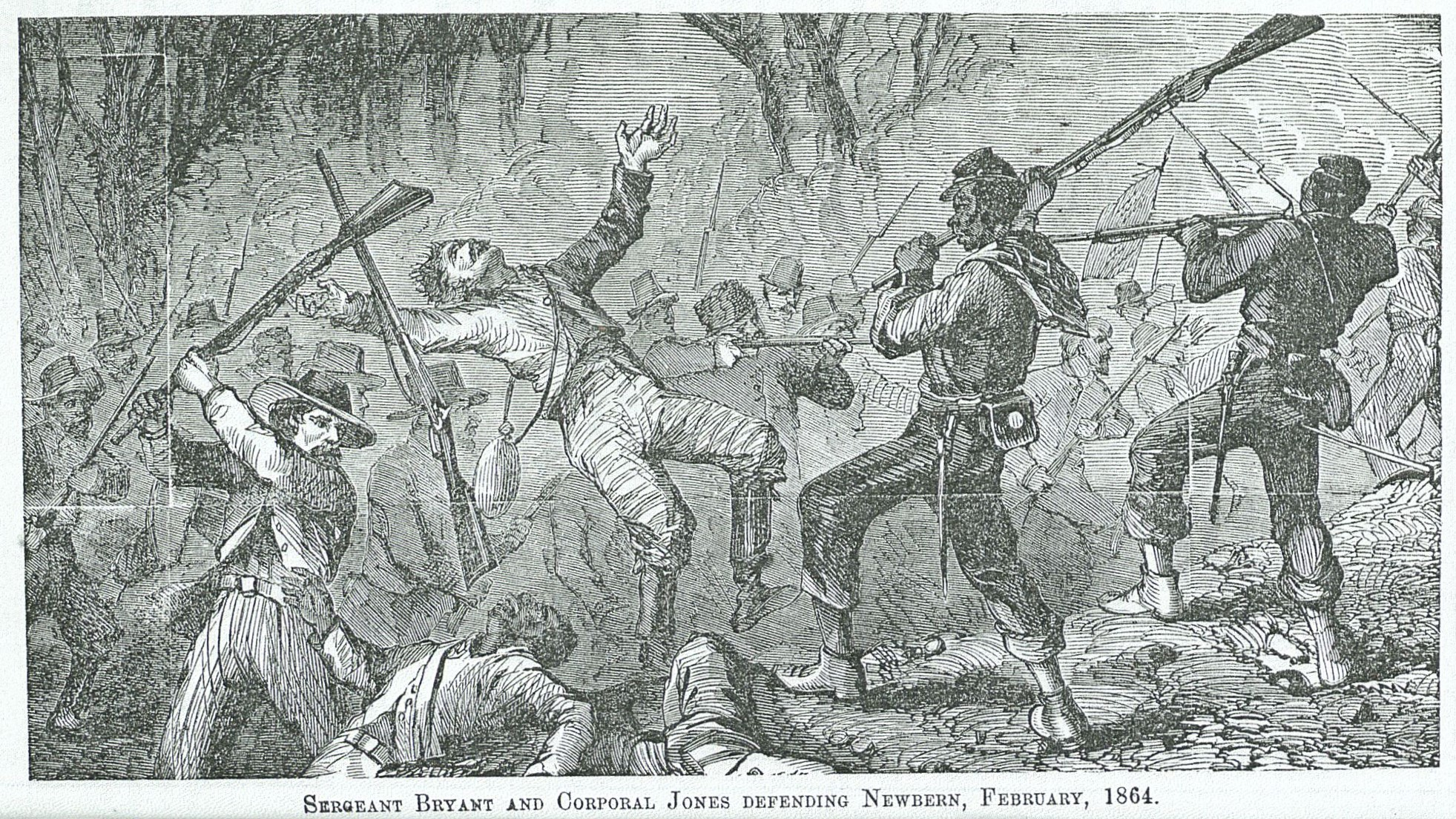
- Depiction of Sergeant Furney Bryant and Corporal Owen Jones of the 1st North Carolina Colored Troops fighting Confederate troops during the Battle of New Bern in February 1864
Date	February 1–3, 1864
Location	New Bern, North Carolina
Result	Union victory

Belligerents
United States	Confederate States

Commanders and leaders
Innis N. Palmer	George E. Pickett

Units involved
New Bern Garrison	Pickett's Division and Hoke’s Brigade

Casualties and losses
13 killed 26 wounded 364 captured and missing	200–300

The Battle of New Bern was fought during the American Civil War from February 1–3, 1864. The battle resulted in the failure of Confederate forces trying to recapture the coastal town of New Bern which had been lost to the Union Army in 1862.

== Background ==
Union forces had captured New Bern during Ambrose Burnside's North Carolina Expedition in March 1862 and had been under Union control ever since. In 1864 the Union garrison was a brigade-sized force commanded by Brig. Gen. Innis N. Palmer. Major General George E. Pickett commanded the Confederate ground forces coordinating against New Bern with a detachment of Confederate Marines and sailors led by Commander John T. Wood. Pickett organized a three-prong attack against the town.

== Battle ==
Brigadier General Robert F. Hoke’s brigade first made contact on February 1 along Bachelor's Creek where he hoped to surprise the Union outpost under Col. Peter Claassen of the 132nd New York Infantry. Both sides brought forward artillery as the fight began to grow and Claassen ordered his men back into New Bern. In the darkness and fog Union reinforcements bound for the fighting became cut off and were captured. Hoke then halted his brigade outside New Bern and waited to hear from the rest of the Confederate attacks. The second Confederate attack was led by Brig. Gen. Seth Barton which moved across the Trent River against the 17th Massachusetts Infantry under Col. Thomas I. C. Amory supported by the 3rd New York Light Artillery. Amory's artillery opened against Barton causing him to believe the Union defenses he faced were far too strong and withdrew from range of the artillery. Pickett's third attack was led by Col. James Dearing against Fort Anderson across the Neuse River. When Dearing came within sight of the fort, like Barton, he too believed the defenses facing him were too formidable to attack. By nightfall Palmer's Union defenses maintained their position and Pickett gave up hope of renewing the assault. On February 2 Commander Wood and his naval contingent surprised the crew of the USS Underwriter anchored in the Neuse River. The majority of the Underwriter’s crew escaped but Wood's Confederates seized the ship and set about to sail her downriver and attack the Union Navy Yard. Union artillery from Fort Stevenson opened fire on the Underwriter setting it on fire and forcing the recent captors to flee. Pickett called off the offensive and retreated on February 4.

== Aftermath ==
General Braxton Bragg, military advisor to Jefferson Davis, urged a change in leadership. General Hoke would resume field command of the Confederate offensive against the Union-held North Carolina coast. Hoke would find greater success in his attack on Plymouth, North Carolina.

After the battle, Pickett singled out 22 men from Company F of the 2nd North Carolina Union Volunteer Infantry Regiment among the Union prisoners he had captured. Claiming them to be former Confederate soldiers, he had them all court-martialed and executed for desertion. Only 2 of the 22 men had ever actually served in the Confederate army. The rest had been members of North Carolina militia units that were forcibly conscripted into the Confederate army. The North Carolina Supreme Court had ruled such acts to be unconstitutional, and the 20 men had left before seeing any actual army service. Other prisoners from the 2nd North Carolina Volunteers were sent to Andersonville prison where all but 3 of them died from disease.

== Sources ==
- Lloyd, H. H., Lloyd’s Battle History of the Great Rebellion. Boston, Massachusetts: B.B. Russell & Co., 1866.
- Chaitin, Peter, The Coastal War: Chesapeake Bay to Rio Grande. Alexandria, Virginia: Time-Life, Incorporated, 1984.
