= James Dearing =

Confederate Army officer in the American Civil War

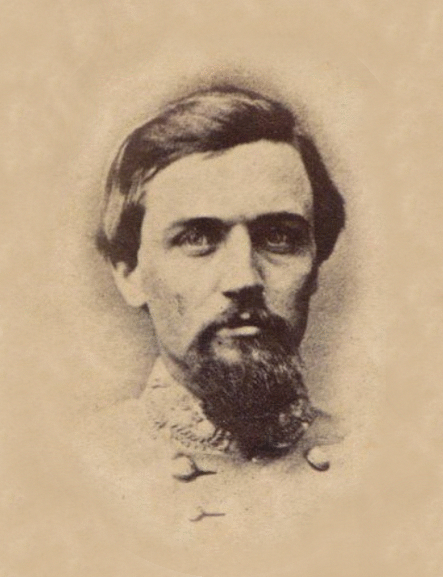
- Born: April 25, 1840; Campbell County, Virginia
- Died: April 22, 1865 (aged 24); Lynchburg, Virginia
- Burial place: Spring Hill Cemetery, Lynchburg
- Military career
- Allegiance: Confederate States of America
- Branch: Confederate States Army
- Service years: 1861–65
- Rank: Brigadier General (not confirmed); Colonel
- Commands: Dearing's (Lynchburg) Battery; 38th Virginia Light Artillery Battalion; 8th Confederate Cavalry Regiment; Dearings Brigade
- Conflicts: American Civil War: First Battle of Manassas; Peninsular Campaign; Second Battle of Manassas; Battle of Fredericksburg; Siege of Suffolk; Battle of Gettysburg; Bermuda Hundred Campaign; Battle of Plymouth; Petersburg Campaign; Battle of Boydton Plank Road; Appomattox Campaign; Battle of High Bridge (DOW)

James Dearing (April 25, 1840 – April 22, 1865) was a Confederate States Army officer during the American Civil War who served in the artillery and cavalry. Dearing entered West Point in 1858 and resigned on April 22, 1861, when Virginia seceded from the Union. Dearing was mortally wounded at the Battle of High Bridge during the Appomattox Campaign of 1865, making him one of the last officers to die in the war. Despite serving as a commander of a cavalry brigade and using the grade of brigadier general after he was nominated to that grade by Confederate President Jefferson Davis, Dearing did not officially achieve the grade of brigadier general because the Confederate Senate did not approve his nomination. His actual permanent grade was colonel.

== Early life ==
Dearing was born in Campbell County, Virginia. He was a great-grandson of Colonel Charles Lynch, a famous revolutionary war veteran who probably gave his name to what is now known as "lynching". A graduate of Hanover Academy he received an appointment to the United States Military Academy in 1858, where he was described as "a reckless, handsome boy" who introduced the tune "Dixie" to the academy, earning him the reputation of a secessionist and demerits from his superiors. Nonetheless, he was ranked first in his class of 1862. When his home state seceded he resigned, just short of the premature graduation of his class, on April 22, 1861.

== American Civil War ==
Dearing traveled to Richmond, Virginia, getting a commission as lieutenant of artillery in the Virginia Militia. He joined the recently arrived Washington Artillery from New Orleans, Louisiana; and was commissioned as 2nd Lieutenant and drill instructor in the 3rd company. He participated in the First Battle of Bull Run while being assigned to the 1st company as part of the 4th Brigade of Colonel Jubal Early in the Army of the Potomac, and served as volunteer aide to his battalion commander Major James B. Walton. Dearing was promoted to 1st Lieutenant in July 1861; and to captain in April 1862 when he became commander of the reorganized Lynchburg ("Latham´s") Battery. Dearing's (Virginia) Battery was attached to George E. Pickett's Brigade and supported it in the Peninsular Campaign, where Dearing was highly praised by Lieutenant General James Longstreet, and in the Second Battle of Bull Run. When Pickett was elevated to division command in Longstreet's First Corps in September Dearing's battery was assigned to the division and fought in the Battle of Fredericksburg.

Captain Dearing was promoted to major in early 1863, and was appointed chief of artillery in Pickett's Division. In April his battalion – made up of the batteries of Captains Stribling ("Fauquier"), Caskie ("Hampden"), Macon ("Richmond Fayette") and Blount (Dearing's old Lynchburg) – was officially organized as 38th Battalion, Virginia Light Artillery. He led his unit with the division into Longstreet's Tidewater Operations and the Siege of Suffolk.

At the Battle of Gettysburg Dearing's Battalion was in camp near Chambersburg and marched on morning of July 2. While his men were on the march Major Dearing rode ahead to the battlefield and offered his services to Lieutenant Colonel E. Porter Alexander of the corps reserve artillery. Alexander, whose battalion supported the division of Major General Lafayette McLaws in its assault of the Peach Orchard, gave Dearing the command of two of his batteries. Those batteries, Jordan's "Bedford" and Woolfolk's "Ashland", were on the right of Alexander's line; and participated in the charge of Barksdale and Kershaw. On July 3 Dearing's battalion took part in the massive artillery barrage prior to Pickett's Charge, positioned right in the center supporting Pickett's division. Inflicting heavy damage Dearing's batteries suffered from counter-battery fire, but stayed in position and was reinforced by numerous guns and sections on Col. Alexander's orders. After the initial charge Dearing's guns supported the advance of Anderson's brigades and put shell against the counterattack of George Stannard's 2nd Vermont Brigade, wounding the later.

Afterwards of Gettysburg Pickett was assigned to command the Department of Southern Virginia and North Carolina; and Dearing went with him. When Pickett needed a mounted force for his operations he selected Major Dearing to command it, and Dearing gathered some 200 men for a provisional battalion. On January 12, 1864, a new cavalry regiment was proposed for service with Pickett, and he recommended Dearing as the commanding officer. Secretary of war James A. Seddon approved it the next day and Dearing, officially a lieutenant colonel of artillery, was promoted to provisional colonel of cavalry. His regiment, known as 8th Confederate (or simply "Dearing´s Confederate") Cavalry, was composed of the former 12th North Carolina Cavalry Battalion and several other companies, as well as a battery of light artillery.

In April 1864, while Dearing participated in the operations again New Bern and Plymouth, he was ordered back to the Army of Northern Virginia with his official rank of lieutenant colonel; to take command of its horse artillery. Virtually at the same time the opening phases of the Siege of Petersburg changed Colonel Dearing's service branch again. On April 29, 1864, he was slated for promotion to brigadier general; and though his promotion was not approved by the Congress of the Confederate States he served with that rank as commander of a cavalry brigade. Still in the Department of Southern Virginia and North Carolina, now under command of P.G.T. Beauregard, Dearing and his confederate brigade (with its own artillery) served as scout and fire brigade.

In July Dearing was given a command in the ANV again, serving in the cavalry division of Major General W.H.F. "Rooney" Lee. His new brigade consisted of the 8th Georgia, 4th and 65th North Carolina cavalry regiments as well as the 16th North Carolina Battalion; later changed included the addition of the 7th Confederate Cavalry. He was falsely reported to be killed in the Battle of Boydton Plank Road. When Beauregard gained command of the Department of the West in winter 1864 he recommended Dearing for a division command, but his recommendation was not followed.

During the Appomattox Campaign Dearing was given another brigade in the division of his old friend and West Point classmate Major General Thomas L. Rosser, composed of the 7th, 11th and 12 Virginia Cavalry regiments and the 35th Virginia Battalion. At the Battle of High Bridge on April 6, 1865, Dearing and his cavalry clashed with a union force of infantry and cavalry. He fought a close range pistol duel with the Union commanders, Colonels Theodore Read and Francis Washburn. Read was killed on the spot, supposedly by Dearing. While Washburn was mortally wounded by a bullet through the mouth. Dearing was mortally wounded himself when he was shot through the lungs, and he was taken prisoner. Brought to Lynchburg's old city hotel (christened "Ladies´ Relief Hospital"), on April 13 he was visited and paroled by his old West Point classmate, Brigadier General Ranald S. Mackenzie, then commanding in Lynchburg. Dearing died on April 22 (like Colonel Washburn), and is buried in Spring Hill Cemetery.

== See also ==
- List of American Civil War generals (Acting Confederate)
