= National Register of Historic Places listings in Washington County, North Carolina =

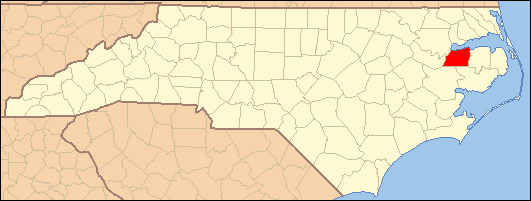

This list includes properties and districts listed on the National Register of Historic Places in Washington County, North Carolina. Click the "Map of all coordinates" link to the right to view a Google map of all properties and districts with latitude and longitude coordinates in the table below.

== Current listings ==
This National Park Service list is complete through NPS recent listings posted March 14, 2025.

	Name on the Register	Image	Date listed	Location	City or town	Description
1	Belgrade and St. David's Church	Belgrade and St. David's Church	January 26, 1978 (#78001983)	E of Creswell St. 35°52′21″N 76°22′54″W	Creswell	
2	Creswell Historic District	Creswell Historic District	October 10, 2002 (#02001112)	Roughly bounded by 208 E. Main St. and 310 W. Main St., 302-304 S. Sixth Sts., and 219 N. Sixth St. 35°52′11″N 76°23′38″W	Creswell	
3	Davenport House		September 5, 2007 (#07000932)	NC 1143 (Mount Tabor Rd.) and NC 1146 (Mount Tabor Road-Backwoods); 35°52′15″N 76°26′59″W	Creswell	
4	Garrett's Island House		February 2, 2001 (#01000047)	1445 Garrett's Island Rd. 35°50′48″N 76°42′22″W	Plymouth	
5	Latham House	Latham House	December 12, 1976 (#76001348)	311 E. Main St. 35°52′02″N 76°44′44″W	Plymouth	
6	Perry-Spruill House	Perry-Spruill House	April 25, 1985 (#85000905)	326 Washington St. 35°51′50″N 76°44′57″W	Plymouth	
7	Plymouth Historic District	Plymouth Historic District	January 16, 1991 (#90002140)	Roughly bounded by Monroe St., the Roanoke River, Latham La., Third St., Washington St. and the Norfolk Southern RR tracks 35°51′51″N 76°45′00″W	Plymouth	
8	Rehoboth Methodist Church		May 13, 1976 (#76001349)	East of Skinnersville on U.S. Route 64; 35°56′22″N 76°31′23″W	Skinnersville	
9	Somerset Place State Historic Site	Somerset Place State Historic Site	February 26, 1970 (#70000481)	In Pettigrew State Park; 35°47′15″N 76°24′20″W	Creswell	
10	Washington County Courthouse	Washington County Courthouse	May 10, 1979 (#79001761)	Main and Adams Sts. 35°52′00″N 76°44′57″W	Plymouth	

== See also ==
- National Register of Historic Places listings in North Carolina
- List of National Historic Landmarks in North Carolina
