= Perry House =

Perry House may refer to:

in Australia

- Perry House, Brisbane, heritage-listed building in Queensland

in USA

- Bass-Perry House, Seale, Alabama, listed on the National Register of Historic Places (NRHP) in Russell County
- David Perry House, Bridgeport, Connecticut, listed on the NRHP in Fairfield County
- Perry-Shockley House, Millsboro, Delaware, listed on the NRHP in Sussex County
- Perry House (Lakeland, Florida), listed on the NRHP in Polk County
- Durham-Perry Farmstead, Bourbonnais, Illinois, listed on the NRHP in Kankakee County
- T.B. Perry House, Albia, Iowa, listed on the NRHP in Monroe County
- Perry House (Perry, Louisiana), listed on the NRHP in Vermilion Parish
- William F. Perry House, Bridgton, Maine, listed on the NRHP in Cumberland County
- Clark Perry House, Machias, Maine, listed on the NRHP in Washington County
- Perry Hall Mansion, Perry Hall, Maryland, listed on the NRHP in Baltimore County
- Perry Point Mansion House and Mill, Perryville, Maryland, listed on the NRHP in Maryland
- Perry-Cooper House, Salisbury, Maryland, listed on the NRHP in Wicomico County
- James Perry House, Rehoboth, Massachusetts, listed on the NRHP in Bristol County
- Warren Perry House, Lapeer, Michigan, listed on the NRHP in Lapeer County
- Glenn and Addie Perry Farmhouse, Plattsmouth, Nebraska, listed on the NRHP in Cass County
- Norman and Marion Perry House, Campton, New Hampshire, listed on the NRHP in Grafton County
- Ivory Perry Homestead, Dublin, New Hampshire, listed on the NRHP in Cheshire County
- John Perry Homestead, Dublin, New Hampshire, listed on the NRHP in Cheshire County
- Perry–Petty Farmstead, Mansfield Township, New Jersey, listed on the NRHP in Warren County
- Peter D. Perry House, Park Ridge, New Jersey, listed on the NRHP in Bergen County
- Ezikial Perry House, Jerusalem, New York, listed on the NRHP in Yates County
- Jacob P. Perry House, Pearl River, New York, listed on the NRHP in Rockland County
- Dr. Samuel Perry House, Gupton, North Carolina, listed on the NRHP in Franklin County
- Perry-Shepherd Farm, Lansing, North Carolina, listed on the NRHP in Ashe County
- Perry-Cherry House, Mount Olive, North Carolina, listed on the NRHP in Wayne County
- Perry-Spruill House, Plymouth, North Carolina, listed on the NRHP in Washington County
- Perry Farm, Riley Hill, North Carolina, listed on the NRHP in Wake County
- Heartsfield-Perry Farm, Rolesville, North Carolina, listed on the NRHP in North Carolina
- Norman Dewey Perry House, Delaware, Ohio, listed on the NRHP in Delaware County
- Jenkins-Perry House, Milan, Ohio, listed on the NRHP in Erie County
- Commodore Oliver Perry Farm, South Kingstown, Rhode Island, listed on the NRHP in Washington County
- Lewis-Card-Perry House, Westerly, Rhode Island, listed on the NRHP in Washington County
- Perry Estate-St. Mary's Academy, Austin, Texas, listed on the NRHP in Travis County
- Perry-Swilley House, Houston, Texas, listed on the NRHP in Harris County
- Capt. William Perry House, Jefferson, Texas, listed on the NRHP in Marion County
- A. F. Perry and Myrtle-Pitmann House, Lufkin, Texas, listed on the NRHP in Angelina County
- C. W. Perry Archie-Hallmark House, Lufkin, Texas, listed on the NRHP in Angelina County
- Perry Hill (Saint Joy, Virginia), listed on the NRHP in Buckingham County
- Melvin W. and Mary Perry House, Algoma, Wisconsin, listed on the NRHP in Kewaunee County

== See also ==
- Parry House (disambiguation)
