= Davenport House (Creswell, North Carolina) =

Historic house in North Carolina, United States

- U.S. National Register of Historic Places
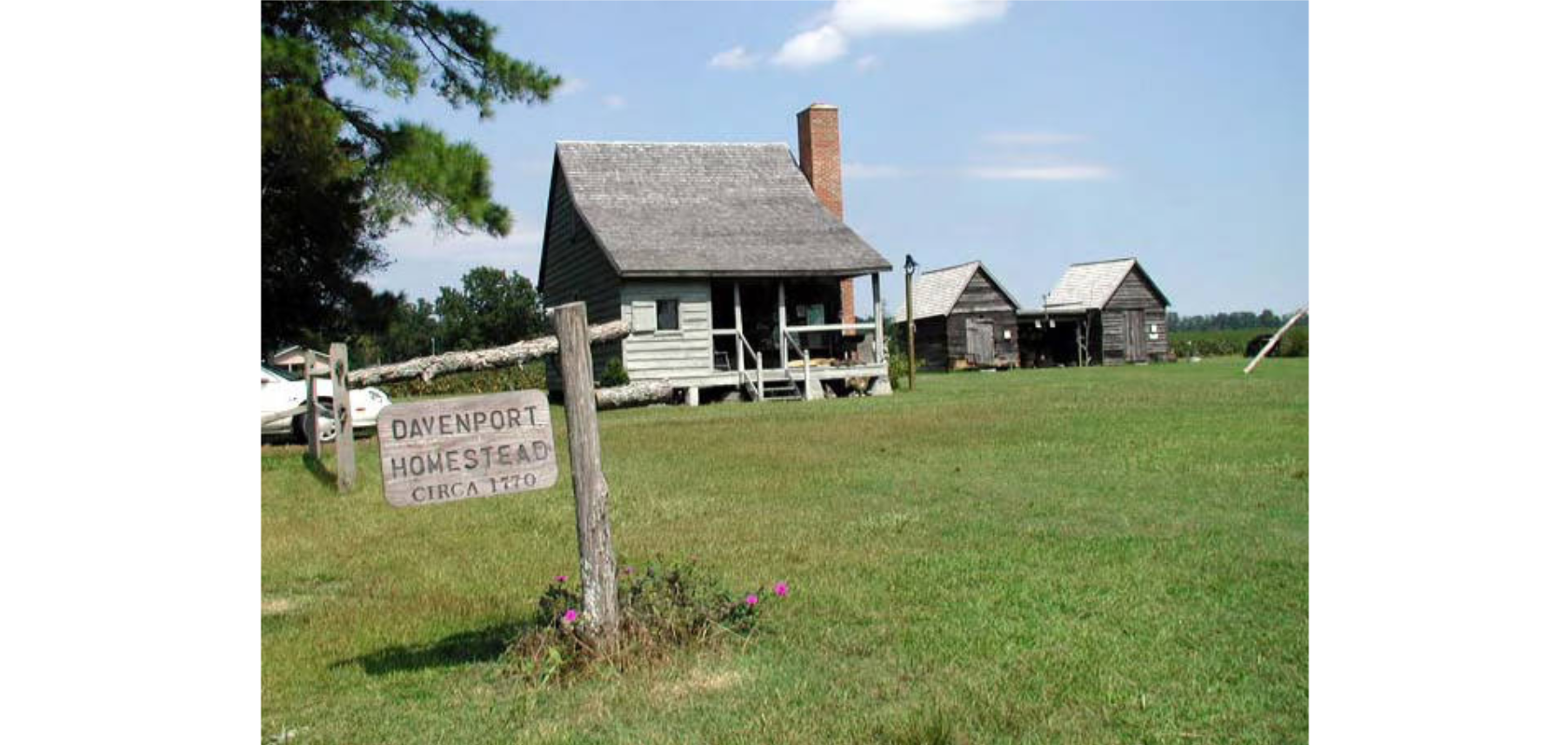

- Location within North Carolina Location within the United States
- Location: VA 1143 (Mount Tabor Rd. and VA 1146 (Mount Tabor Road-Backwoods, near Creswell, North Carolina
- Coordinates: 35°52′3″N 76°27′0″W
- Area: 0.5 acres (0.20 ha)
- Built: c. 1815
- Architectural style: One-room coastal cottage
- NRHP reference No.: 07000932
- Added to NRHP: September 5, 2007

Davenport House is a historic homestead located on Mount Tabor Road in Creswell, Washington County, North Carolina. It was built about 1815, and is a 1 1/2-story, heavy timber-frame cottage. The layout of the house is a one-room core and an engaged porch with a rear shed room and features a broken-slope roof. The architecture of the home is classified as a "coastal cottage" in North Carolina regional architecture. Few examples of this style of home have survived, but similar one-room core historic homes include Purefoy-Chappell House and the Cullen and Elizabeth Jones House. It is the oldest homestead available for public viewing in the region. The homestead is part of the estate of Daniel Davenport, the first representative to the North Carolina Senate from Washington County. (It is noted that Davenport was a slave owner, although his descendants were not.). The house itself is presumed to have been built by his daughter, Asenath Davenport.

The house is located on a 1.02-acre plot. The larger homestead includes several features such as three historic outbuildings (a smoke house, corn crib, and loom house) which were relocated to their current locations and an additional five structures which were constructed later in the home's history but are in their original locations. (chicken coop, well house, outhouse, and two sheds) The property was never outfitted with plumbing or heat, nor wired for electricity even though it was an occupied home until 1975. On the property are the graves of the building's last three occupants. (Susan Ann and Armistead Davenport, and their daughter Harriet Ann Davenport) The house was gifted to the Historical Society of Washington County in 1995 on the condition the property be renovated. The society's restoration of the property included extensive roof and chimney repair, as well as repairs to the siding and internal features. In 1999 the homestead was opened as a museum, furnished with both replica and original items depicting the life of homesteaders during the late 1790s.

The house was listed on the National Register of Historic Places in 2007, though the outbuildings are not included in the designation.
