= El Rancho Hotel =

El Rancho Hotel may refer to

- El Rancho Vegas, a demolished hotel and casino on the Las Vegas Strip, operated from 1941 to 1960
- El Rancho Hotel and Casino, another demolished property on the Strip, operated from 1982 to 1992
- El Rancho Hotel & Motel a National Historic Site in Gallup, New Mexico
- El Rancho Hotel Haiti
