= Parry House =

Parry House may refer to:

- William D. Parry House, Marble, Colorado, a National Register of Historic Places listing in Gunnison County, Colorado
- John E. Parry House, Glens Falls, New York
- Parry House (Highland Falls, New York)
- Hollister-Parry House, Woodsfield, Ohio
- Parry Lodge, Kanab, Utah, a National Register of Historic Places listing in Kane County, Utah
- Cox-Shoemaker-Parry House, Manti, Utah, a National Register of Historic Places listing in Sanpete County, Utah

== See also ==
- Perry House (disambiguation)
