= North Carolina Black Bear Festival =

- Frequency: Annually
- Locations: Plymouth, North Carolina, United States
- Website: Official website

The North Carolina Black Bear Festival is a three-day annual June event in Plymouth, North Carolina.

The festival celebrates black bears as an important part of North Carolina's cultural, historical and natural heritage. The festival has over thirty activities, such as live music, bear tours, museums, and helicopter rides. The festival has up to 30,000 attendees each year.

== History ==
The North Carolina Black Bear Festival was created in 2015 by Tom Harrison, director of Washington County Travel & Tourism Authority. The festival was created to celebrate that North Carolina has the largest black bears and the highest density black bear population globally.

In its first year, the festival was given the "Rising Star Award" and later was awarded the "Top Twenty Event Award" as well as "Best Event" from the Southeast Festival & Events Association. There were around 7000 visitors the first year; in 2018 the event had around 30,000 visitors from 18 states and four countries. Events include mechanical rides, wildlife museums, tours on a bear farm, helicopter rides, a black bear tent theatre, and fishing.

National Black Bear Day, which is celebrated on the first Saturday in June, was founded by the festival.

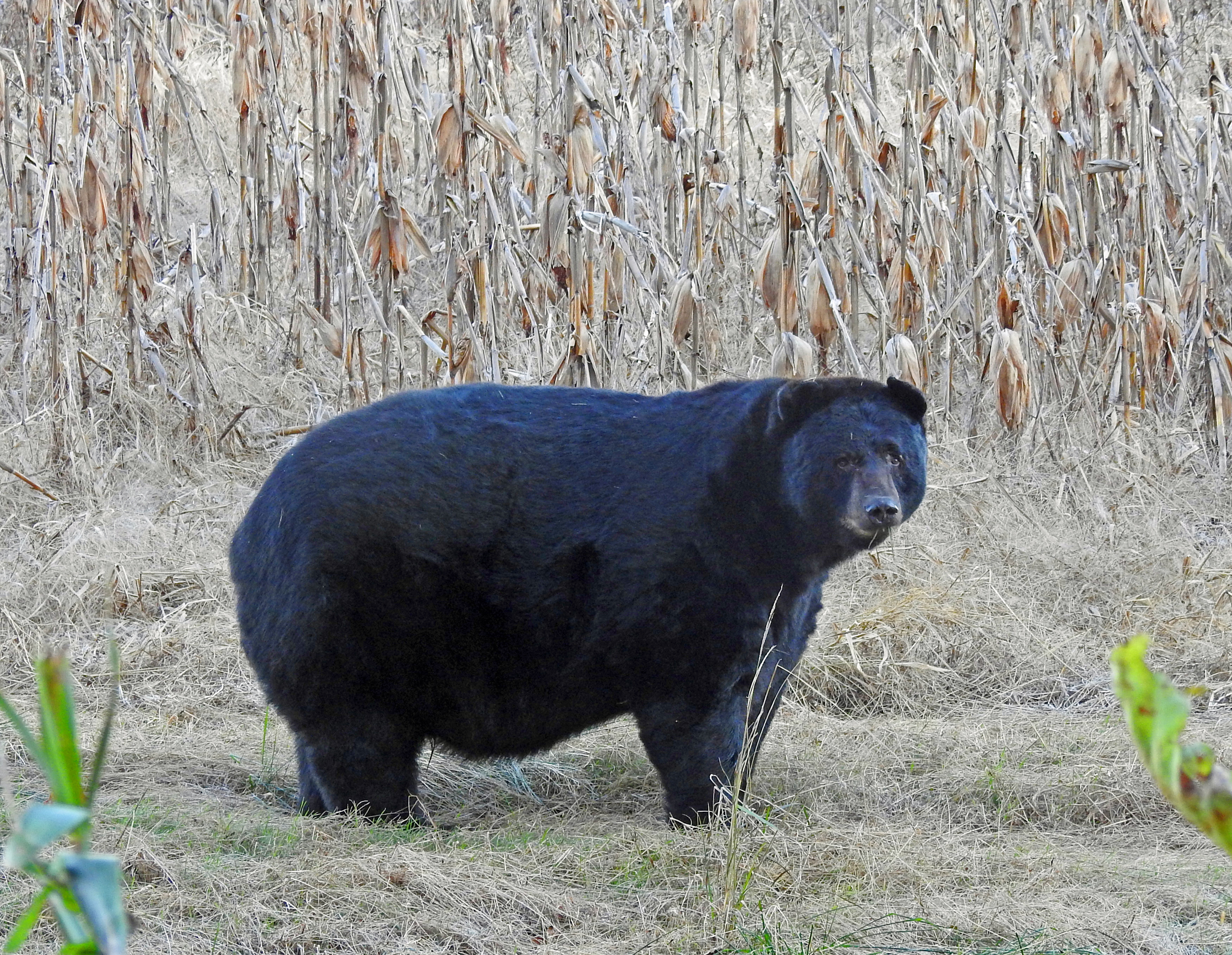
A black bear in its natural habitat
