= Belgrade and St. David's Church =

Historic house in North Carolina, United States

- U.S. National Register of Historic Places
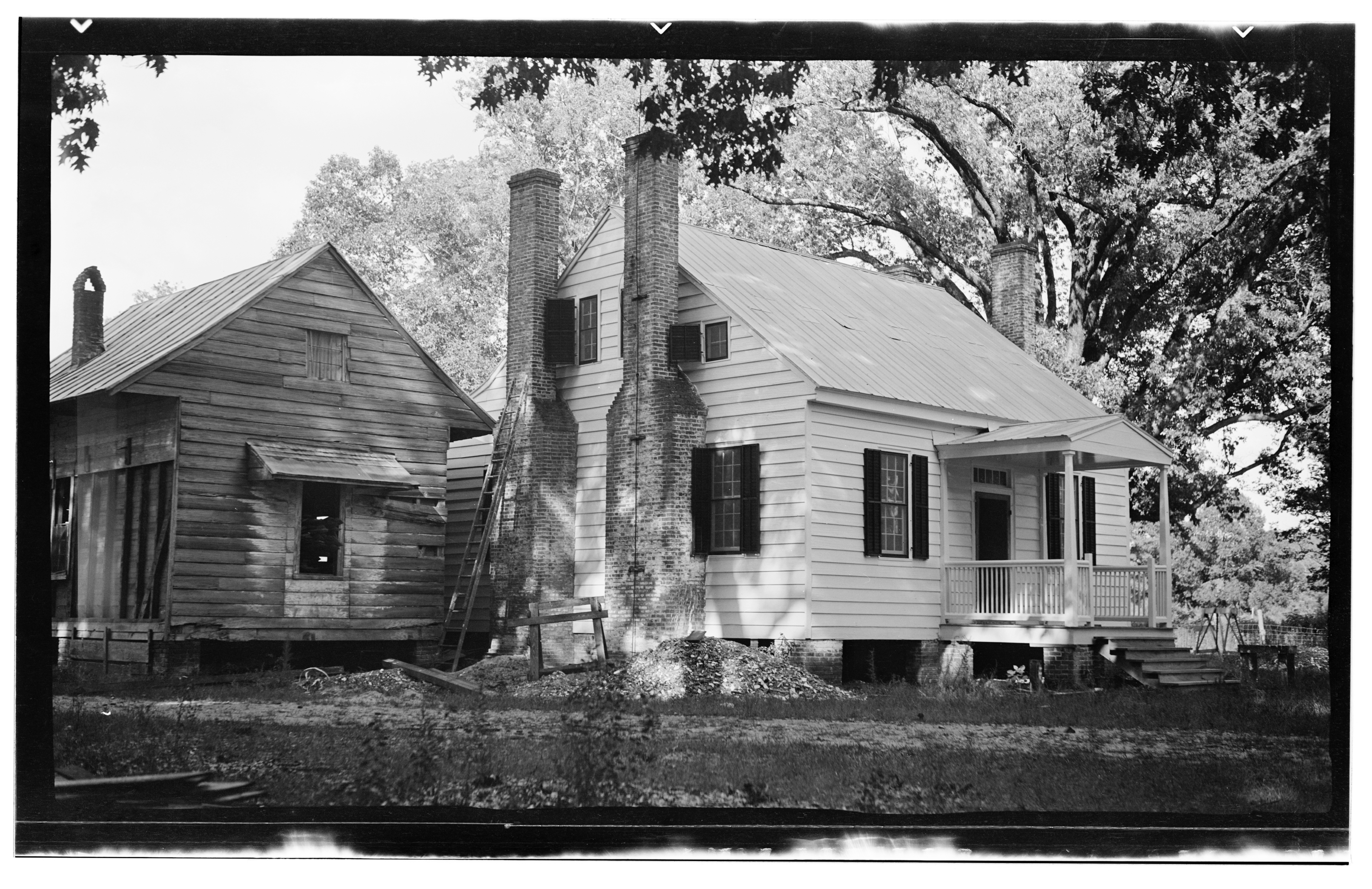
- Pettigrew House, HABS photo, July 1940

- Location within North Carolina Location within the United States
- Location: E of Creswell St., Creswell, North Carolina
- Coordinates: 35°52′14″N 76°22′59″W
- Area: 20 acres (8.1 ha)
- Built: 1797
- Architectural style: Georgian, vernacular
- NRHP reference No.: 78001983
- Added to NRHP: January 26, 1978

Belgrade and St. David's Church, also known as Pettigrew's Chapel, is a historic Episcopal church and home located at Creswell, Washington County, North Carolina. St. David's Church was built over a number of years. It is a cruciform, weatherboarded frame structure with a cross gable roof. It features a late-19th century two-part bell tower with a four-faced, pyramidal, bell-cast spire. Belgrade was built about 1797, and is a small one-story Georgian style frame dwelling with a steep gable roof. It was the home of the home of Charles "Parson" Pettigrew, first Bishop of the Episcopal Diocese of North Carolina.

It was listed on the National Register of Historic Places in 1978.
