= Dorothy Spruill Redford =

- Born: August 07, 1943 (age 83); Columbia, North Carolina
- Died: September 30, 2023
- Education: Queens College and East Carolina University
- Occupations: Author, historian

Dorothy Spruill "Dot" Redford (born August 7, 1943 - died September 30, 2023) is an author, historian and former executive director of Somerset Place, a state historic site near Creswell, North Carolina. She is best known for the published account of her research into her family history, Somerset Homecoming: Recovering a Lost Heritage.

== Biography ==
Dorothy Spruill Redford was born in Columbia, North Carolina on August 7, 1943. She grew up in Queens, New York, and attended Queens College. Inspired by Roots and her daughter's questions about her ancestors, Redford began to research her family history. Redford spent nearly ten years researching her connection to the enslaved population of Somerset Place. In 1986, her research inspired the first Somerset Homecoming, a reunion of more than 2,000 descendants of the enslaved community of Somerset Plantation. She co-authored a book about her family history and the reunion with reporter Mike D'Orso in 1988, the same year she began working as a program consultant at the Somerset Place State Historic Site. She served as the site director from 1990 until her retirement in 2008. Redford was influential in transforming the interpretation of slavery at Somerset Place, creating a model of inclusive interpretation. Her efforts led to the reconstruction of a number of buildings related to the enslaved community, including slave cabins and the hospital, which is now the only interpreted slave hospital anywhere in the United States. Redford received an honorary doctor of letters degree from East Carolina University in 2010.
