= Plymouth High School (North Carolina) =

Location
- 800 East Main Street; Plymouth, North Carolina 27962; United States
- Coordinates: 35°52′11″N 76°44′16″W

Information
- Type: Comprehensive public high school
- School district: Washington County Schools
- Superintendent: Delila Jackson
- CEEB code: 343145
- Principal: Ivry Cheeks
- Faculty: 41
- Teaching staff: 17.87 (FTE)
- Grades: 9–12
- Enrollment: 260 (2023–2024)
- Student to teacher ratio: 14.55
- Campus type: Rural
- Colors: Blue, gold, white
- Mascot: Vikings
- Feeder schools: Plymouth Elementary School
- Website: www.washingtonco.k12.nc.us/phs/

Plymouth High School is a public high school located in Plymouth, North Carolina, United States. It is one of two high schools, along with Creswell High School, that are a part of Washington County Schools. It became Washington County High School. The student body is predominantly African American. Panthers are the school mascot.

== Football ==
The Plymouth Vikings football team had an active streak of making the NCHSAA State 1-A football championship game in five consecutive years (2012–2016), and made six appearances overall. The team won championships in 2007, 2012, and 2015.

== Accident ==
On July 30, 1997, ten members of the Plymouth High School marching band were killed when their vehicle was struck by a tractor trailer truck while returning to band camp from their lunch break.

== Notable alumni ==
- William Barber II — Protestant minister and political activist
- Charles Bowser — former NFL linebacker
- Don Brown — author and attorney
