= Creswell High School (North Carolina) =

Location
- 115 Middle Street; Creswell, North Carolina 27928; United States
- Coordinates: 35°52′09″N 76°23′45″W

Information
- Type: Comprehensive public high school
- Motto: “We just can’t hide that Tiger Pride!”
- School district: Washington County Schools
- Superintendent: Valerie H. Bridges
- CEEB code: 340945
- Principal: Sharon Cherry
- Faculty: 16
- Grades: 6–12
- Enrollment: 169 (2016–17)
- Campus type: Rural
- Color(s): White, burnt orange, and navy blue
- Mascot: Tiger
- Feeder schools: Creswell Elementary School
- Website: www.washingtonco.k12.nc.us/chs/

Creswell High School was a public high school located in Creswell, North Carolina. It was one of two high schools, along with Plymouth High School, in Washington County Schools. Creswell High School served grades 6–12. Creswell High School's enrollment as of 2010 was 161 students. The student body was 52% Black; 39% White; 5% Hispanic; and 4% Unknown. All Creswell students received a free or reduced lunch. It was shut down following the class of 2018 as the county made room for Washington County High School. The shutdown of Creswell High lost the county a total of 44 students to neighboring county school systems, a large portion of the small school.
