= Plymouth Historic District (Plymouth, North Carolina) =

Historic district in North Carolina, United States

- U.S. National Register of Historic Places
- U.S. Historic district
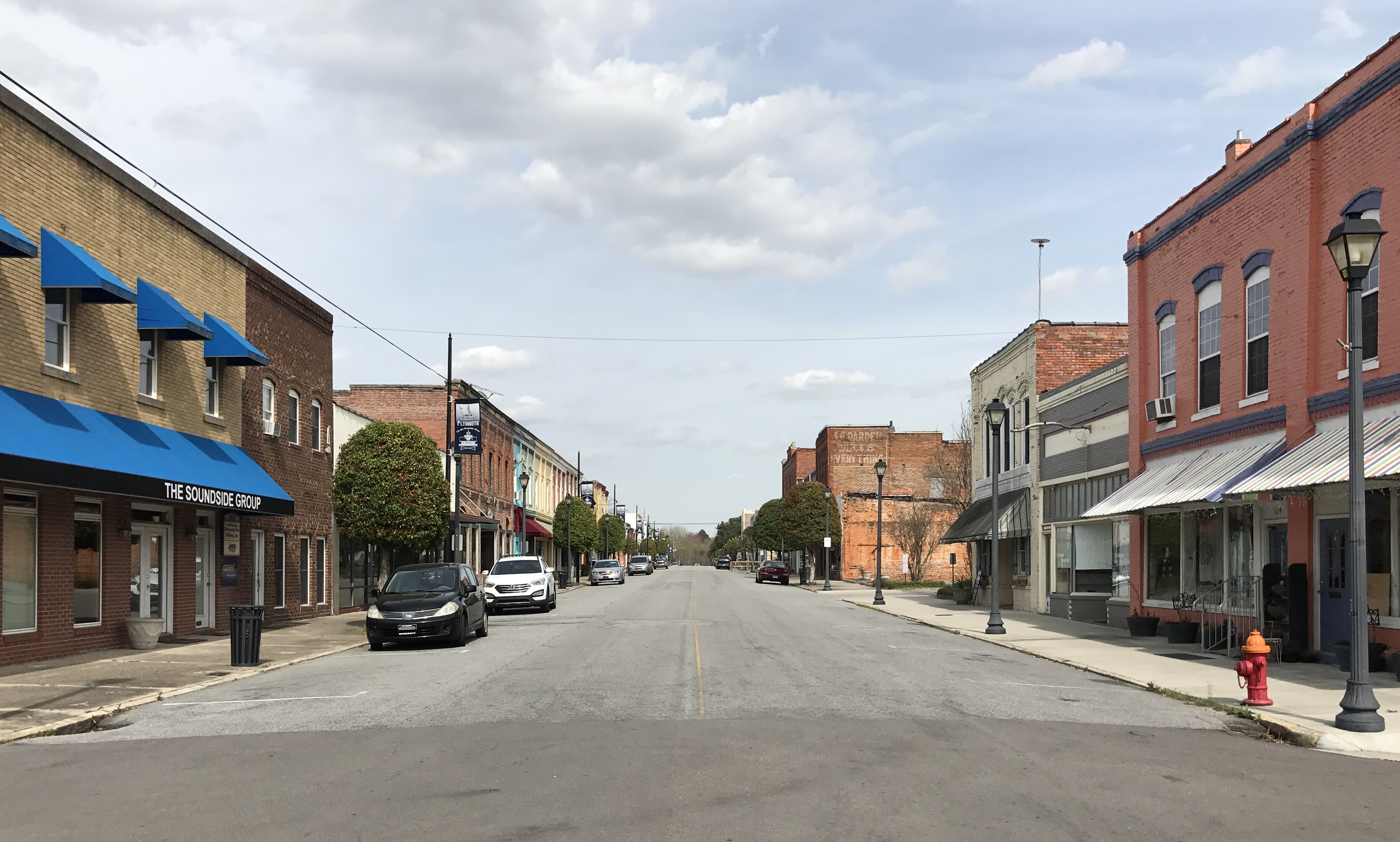

- Location within North Carolina Location within the United States
- Location: Roughly bounded by Monroe St., the Roanoke R., Latham La., Third St., Washington St. and the Norfolk Southern RR tracks, Plymouth, North Carolina
- Coordinates: 35°51′51″N 76°45′00″W
- Area: 122 acres (49 ha)
- Built: 1898
- Architect: Upjohn, Richard; Et al.
- Architectural style: Colonial Revival, Bungalow/craftsman, Late Victorian
- MPS: Plymouth MPS
- NRHP reference No.: 90002140
- Added to NRHP: January 16, 1991

Plymouth Historic District is a national historic district located in Plymouth, Washington County, North Carolina. The district encompasses 258 contributing buildings, 5 contributing sites, and 1 contributing structure in the central business district and surrounding residential sections of Plymouth. It was largely developed between about 1880 and 1930 and includes notable examples of Colonial Revival, Bungalow / American Craftsman and Late Victorian style architecture. Located in the district are the separately listed Latham House, Perry-Spruill House, and Washington County Courthouse. Other notable buildings include the Hornthal-Owens Building (c. 1885), Blount Building (c. 1916), Atlantic Coast Line Railroad Station (1923), Davenport-Davis House (c. 1898), Robert Ward Johnston House (1924), Latham-Brinkley House (1883), Plymouth United Methodist Church and Cemetery (c. 1860s), Grace Episcopal Church and Cemetery (1860-1861, 1892-1893) designed by Richard Upjohn, New Chapel Baptist Church (1924), Agricultural Building (1936-1937) constructed through the Works Progress Administration, Plvmouth Railroad Station (1927), Brinkley Commercial Block (1926), and Clark-Chesson House (c. 1810).

It was listed on the National Register of Historic Places in 1991.
