= Garrett's Island House =

Historic house in North Carolina, United States

- U.S. National Register of Historic Places
- Location within North Carolina Location within the United States
- Location: 1445 Garrett's Island Rd., near Plymouth, North Carolina
- Coordinates: 35°50′48″N 76°42′22″W
- Area: 1 acre (0.40 ha)
- Built: c. 1760
- Architectural style: Georgian, Federal, et al.
- NRHP reference No.: 01000047
- Added to NRHP: February 2, 2001

Garrett's Island House is a historic home located near Plymouth, Washington County, North Carolina. It was built about 1760, and is a 1 1/2-story, Georgian / Federal style frame dwelling with a gambrel roof. It has a shed roofed front porch and double-shouldered exterior brick chimney. Garrett's Island House is thought to be the oldest extant dwelling in Washington County.

It was listed on the National Register of Historic Places in 2001.
