= Mike D'Orso =

American journalist

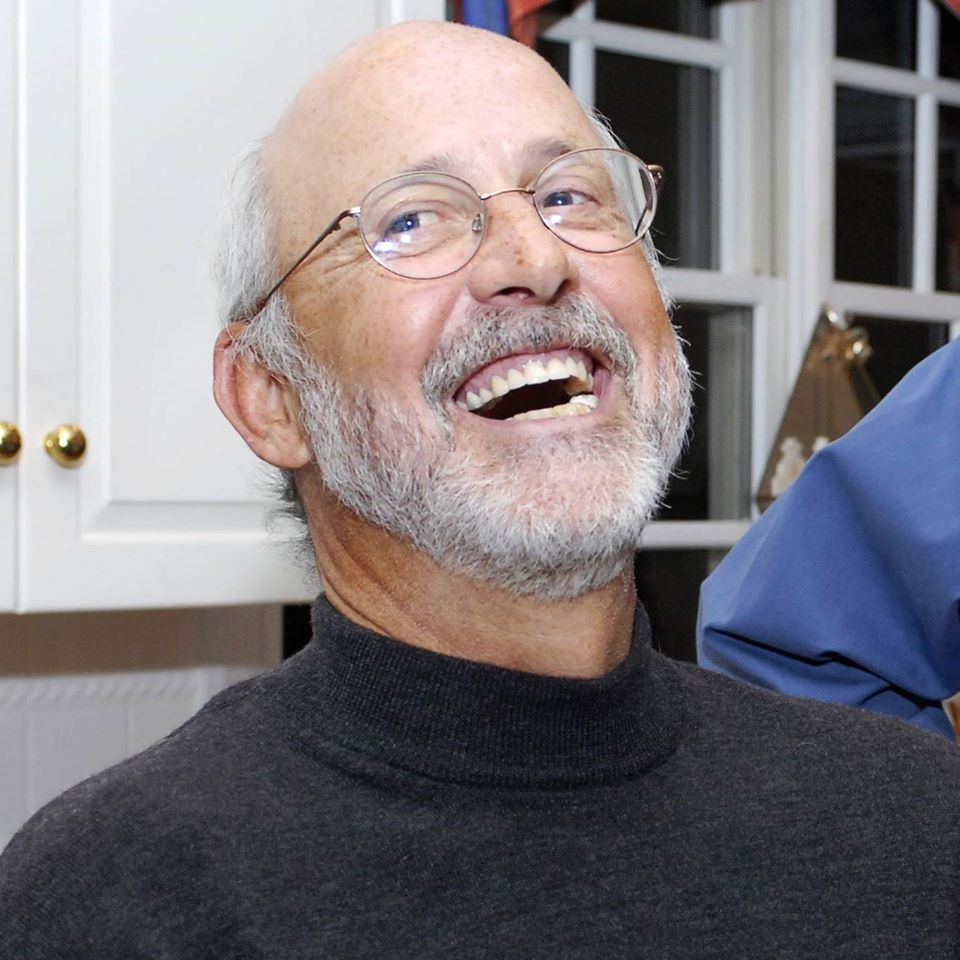
- Born: October 12, 1953 (age 72); Portsmouth, Virginia
- Education: College of William & Mary (BA, MA)
- Occupations: Author, journalist

Mike D'Orso (born October 12, 1953) is an American author and journalist based in Norfolk, Virginia.

He wrote Like Judgment Day: The Ruin and Redemption of a Town Called Rosewood (1996), Plundering Paradise: The Hand of Man on the Galapagos Islands (2002), and Eagle Blue: A Team, A Tribe and a High School Basketball Season in Arctic Alaska (2006). His co-written books include Walking With the Wind: A Memoir of the Movement (1998), written with U.S. Congressman and former civil rights leader John Lewis; Rise and Walk: The Trial and Triumph of Dennis Byrd (1993), written with New York Jet defensive end Dennis Byrd; and Oceana: Our Endangered Oceans and What We Can Do to Save Them (2011), written with actor and environmental activist Ted Danson.

== Life ==
D'Orso's father was a U.S. Navy submarine officer and a graduate of the U.S. Naval Academy. D'Orso was born in Portsmouth, Virginia to James and Claire D'Orso, and was raised in military base cities, including: Key West, Florida; San Diego, California; Charleston, South Carolina; and Frankfurt, Germany. He graduated with a degree in philosophy from the College of William and Mary in 1975 and earned a master's degree in English from William and Mary in 1981.

D'Orso was a staff writer for Commonwealth Magazine (1981-1984), features writer for The Virginian-Pilot (1984-1993), and contributor to Sports Illustrated magazine (1988-1993). Seven of his books have been best sellers: Rosewood: Like Judgment Day and Body For Life (both The New York Times); Walking With the Wind (The Los Angeles Times and The Washington Post); Like No Other Time and In Praise of Public Life (The Washington Post); Rise and Walk (Bookstore Journal National Christian Bestsellers); and Winning With Integrity (Business Week). Walking With the Wind also won the 1999 Robert F. Kennedy Book Award and was selected for Newsweek magazine's 2009 list of "50 Books For Our Times".

== Works ==
D'Orso's work often involves issues of social justice. His first book, Somerset Homecoming (1988), written with Dorothy Redford, was about Redford's investigation into her ancestors' experience as slaves in North Carolina.

Like Judgment Day discussed the 1923 Rosewood massacre, and the survivors' pursuit of reparations seventy years later.

Walking With the Wind was a biography of John Lewis, a leader of the civil rights movement during the 1960s.

Eagle Blue was about rural Native American villagers in arctic Alaska shifting from a subsistence lifestyle of hunting, trapping and fishing to a modern cash economy.

Plundering Paradise described the social and environmental impact of thousands of Ecuadorians moving to the Galapagos Islands in search of jobs.

== Works ==
- D'Orso, Michael (1988), with Dorothy Redford. Somerset Homecoming: Recovering a Lost Heritage. New York: Doubleday. ISBN 0-385-24245-X
- D'Orso, Michael (1990). Fast Takes: Slices of Life Through a Journalist's Eye. Norfolk, Va.: Hampton Roads Publishing. ISBN 0-9624375-6-5
- D'Orso, Michael (1992), with Carl Elliott. The Cost of Courage: The Journey of an American Congressman. New York: Doubleday. ISBN 0-385-42091-9
- D'Orso, Michael (1993), with Madeline Cartwright. For the Children: Lessons From a Visionary School Principal. New York: Doubleday. ISBN 0-385-42372-1
- D'Orso, Michael (1993), with Dennis Byrd. Rise and Walk: The Trial and Triumph of Dennis Byrd. New York: HarperCollins. ISBN 0-06-017783-7
- D'Orso, Michael (1994). Pumping Granite: Portraits of People at Play. Lubbock, Tex.: Texas Tech University Press. ISBN 0-89672-338-0
- D'Orso, Michael (1996). Like Judgment Day: The Ruin and Redemption of a Town Called Rosewood. New York: Grosset/Putnam. ISBN 0-399-14147-2
- D'Orso, Michael (1997), with Dee Hakala. Thin is Just a Four-Letter Word. New York: Little, Brown. ISBN 0-316-33911-3
- D'Orso, Michael (1998), with John Lewis. Walking With the Wind: A Memoir of the Movement. New York: Simon & Schuster. ISBN 0-684-81065-4
- D'Orso, Michael (1998), with Leigh Steinberg. Winning With Integrity: Getting What You're Worth without Selling Your Soul. New York: Random House. ISBN 0-375-50179-7
- D'Orso, Michael (1999), with Bill Phillips. Body For Life: 12 Weeks to Mental and Physical Fitness. New York: HarperCollins. ISBN 0-06-019339-5
- D'Orso, Michael (2000), with Joseph Lieberman. In Praise of Public Life. New York: Simon & Schuster. ISBN 0-684-86774-5
- D'Orso, Michael (2002). Plundering Paradise: The Hand of Man on the Galapagos Islands. New York: HarperCollins. IBN 0-06-019390-5
- D'Orso, Michael (2003), with Tom Daschle. Like No Other Time: The 107th Congress and the Two Years That Ruined America Forever. New York: Crown. ISBN 1-4000-4955-5
- D'Orso, Michael (2006). Eagle Blue: A Team, A Tribe and a High School Basketball Season in Arctic Alaska. New York: Bloomsbury. ISBN 1-58234-623-2
- D'Orso, Michael (2011), with Ted Danson. Oceana: Our Endangered Oceans and What We Can Do to Save Them. New York: Rodale. ISBN 978-1-60529-262-5
