= John Bunyan Respess =

American politician

John Bunyan Respess (August 1833 – February 12, 1909) was a state legislator in North Carolina. In 1868 and 1872 he served in the North Carolina Senate.

== Early life ==
Respess was born in August 1833 in Plymouth, North Carolina, to Ransom and Sarah Respess. His mother died soon after he was born.

== Marriages ==
He married Elizabeth Hyman Stubbs in 1853 who died around 1890-1893. He then married Cornelia Alice Hyman on January 16, 1893.

== Career ==
Respess was elected to represent Hyde County and Beaufort County in 1868 and again in 1872. In the 1872 election he was listed as Republican. During this second session he was also made Justice of the peace September 1, 1873, for Washington, North Carolina.

Respess served as district elector for Beaufort County in the 1876 election. In 1878 he made his first run for congress as one of three candidates for the North Carolina's 1st congressional district standing as an independent Republican but lost to Jesse Johnson Yeates, the incumbent Democrat. In 1880, Respess served as the republican presidential elector. He took a second run at congress in 1883 but lost the United States House of Representatives election to Thomas G. Skinner obtaining 46.3% of the vote.

In Pantego, North Carolina, he served as a collector of customs and as a postmaster. He died February 12, 1909, at his home in Pantego.
