= Creswell, North Carolina =

- Town
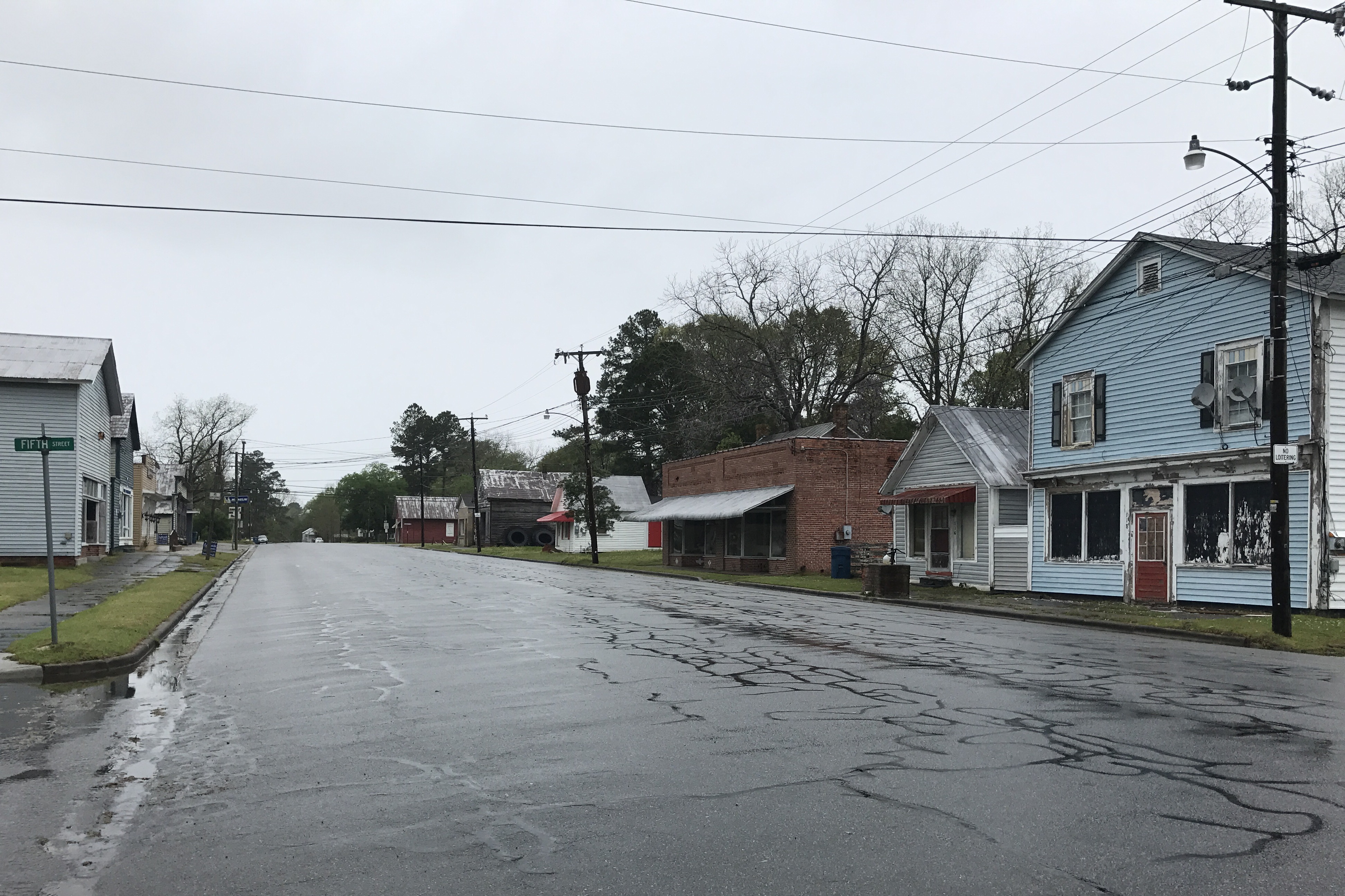
- Downtown Creswell

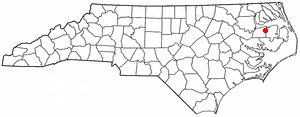
- Location of Creswell, North Carolina
- Coordinates: 35°52′13″N 76°23′38″W
- Country: United States
- State: North Carolina
- County: Washington

Area
  - Total: 0.57 sq mi (1.47 km^{2})
  - Land: 0.57 sq mi (1.47 km^{2})
  - Water: 0 sq mi (0.00 km^{2})
- Elevation: 7 ft (2.1 m)

Population (2020)
  - Total: 207
  - Density: 365.8/sq mi (141.22/km^{2})
- Time zone: UTC-5 (Eastern (EST))
  - Summer (DST): UTC-4 (EDT)
- ZIP code: 27928
- Area code: 252
- FIPS code: 37-15420
- GNIS feature ID: 2406336
- Website: https://townofcreswell.com/

Creswell is a town in Washington County, North Carolina, United States. The population was 207 at the 2020 census.

== Geography ==
The town is located in the North Carolina Inner Banks on the north-central portion of the Albemarle-Pamlico Peninsula, and along the western edge of the southern portions of the Scuppernong River.

According to the United States Census Bureau, the town has a total area of 0.4 square miles (1.0 km^{2}), all land.

== Demographics ==
Historical population
Census	Pop.	Note	%±
1880	145		—
1890	202		39.3%
1900	224		10.9%
1910	329		46.9%
1920	393		19.5%
1930	350		−10.9%
1940	459		31.1%
1950	425		−7.4%
1960	402		−5.4%
1970	633		57.5%
1980	426		−32.7%
1990	361		−15.3%
2000	278		−23.0%
2010	276		−0.7%
2020	207		−25.0%
U.S. Decennial Census

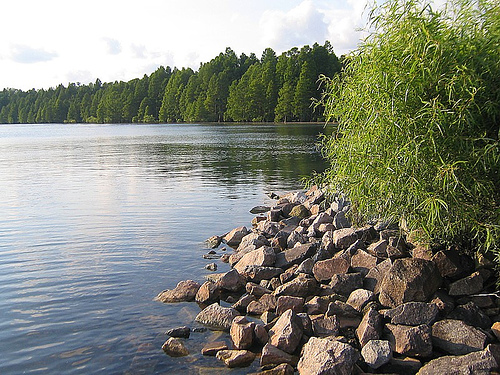
A scenic view of Lake Phelps at nearby Pettigrew State Park

As of the census of 2000, there were 278 people, 118 households, and 86 families residing in the town. The population density was 666.0 inhabitants per square mile (257.1/km^{2}). There were 141 housing units at an average density of 337.8 per square mile (130.4/km^{2}). The racial makeup of the town was 50.00% White, 39.93% African American, 0.36% Native American, 0.36% Asian, 1.80% Pacific Islander, 4.68% from other races, and 2.88% from two or more races. Hispanic or Latino of any race were 6.83% of the population.

There were 118 households, out of which 28.0% had children under the age of 18 living with them, 40.7% were married couples living together, 27.1% had a female householder with no husband present, and 27.1% were non-families. 24.6% of all households were made up of individuals, and 13.6% had someone living alone who was 65 years of age or older. The average household size was 2.36 and the average family size was 2.77.

In the town, the population was spread out, with 22.3% under the age of 18, 10.4% from 18 to 24, 19.1% from 25 to 44, 24.1% from 45 to 64, and 24.1% who were 65 years of age or older. The median age was 43 years. For every 100 females, there were 78.2 males. For every 100 females age 18 and over, there were 77.0 males.

The median income for a household in the town was $20,833, and the median income for a family was $23,750. Males had a median income of $25,000 versus $16,500 for females. The per capita income for the town was $11,769. About 18.3% of families and 26.1% of the population were below the poverty line, including 41.1% of those under the age of eighteen and 20.3% of those 65 or over.

== History ==
Creswell was incorporated in 1874, and named for John Angel James Creswell, the United States Postmaster General at that time. The structures in downtown Creswell are some of North Carolina's best remaining examples of downtown architecture from the late 19th century.

The Belgrade and St. David's Church, Creswell Historic District, Davenport House, and Somerset Place State Historic Site are listed on the National Register of Historic Places.

== Transportation ==
=== Highways and roads ===
The town can be accessed from the east or west by U.S. Highway 64, and from the north or south by North Carolina Highway 94.

Creswell is within 300 miles (480 km) of these destinations:

- 9 miles (14 km) - Columbia
- 21 miles (34 km) - Edenton
- 23 miles (37 km) - Plymouth
- 44 miles (71 km) - Williamston
- 45 miles (72 km) - Elizabeth City
- 46 miles (74 km) - Manteo
- 54 miles (87 km) - Nags Head
- 55 miles (89 km) - Washington
- 69 miles (111 km) - Greenville
- 83 miles (134 km) - Norfolk, Virginia
- 93 miles (150 km) - Virginia Beach, Virginia
- 139 miles (224 km) - Raleigh
- 148 miles (238 km) - Richmond, Virginia
- 154 miles (248 km) - Durham
- 170 miles (270 km) - Wilmington
- 207 miles (333 km) - Greensboro
- 234 miles (377 km) - Winston-Salem
- 241 miles (388 km) - Myrtle Beach, South Carolina
- 253 miles (407 km) - Washington, D.C.
- 260 miles (420 km) - Roanoke, Virginia
- 266 miles (428 km) - Dover, Delaware
- 280 miles (450 km) - Charlotte
- 290 miles (470 km) - Baltimore, Maryland
- 294 miles (473 km) - Atlantic City, New Jersey

=== Airports ===
Air travel is best served through the Norfolk International Airport (ORF) in Norfolk, Virginia or the Pitt-Greenville Airport (PGV) in Greenville, North Carolina

== Politics ==
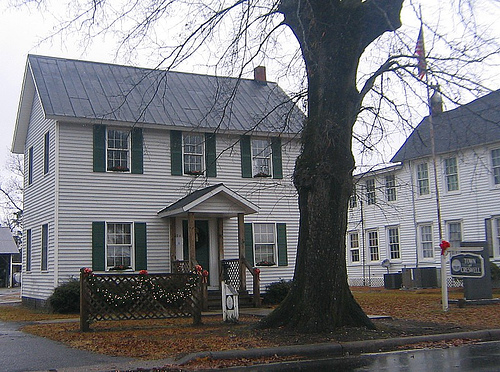
Town Hall - Creswell, North Carolina

=== Town government ===
The Mayor of Creswell is Alfredia Williams.

Elected members to the Town Board of Commissioners:

- Thomas Patrick
- Ron Ambrose
- Brenda Logan
- Joel Harris

=== State government ===
Creswell is served in the North Carolina General Assembly by State Senator Norman Sanderson (Republican) and State Representative Ed Goodwin (Republican).

=== Federal government ===
The town is also served in the United States Congress by U.S. Senator Thom Tillis (Republican), U.S. Senator Ted Budd (Republican) and U.S. Representative Don Davis (Democrat).

=== Recent issues ===
The Town of Creswell is aligned with a group called North Carolinians Opposed to the Outlying Landing Field. This group opposes a United States Navy proposal to construct an outlying landing field near the Pocosin Lakes National Wildlife Refuge in Washington County.

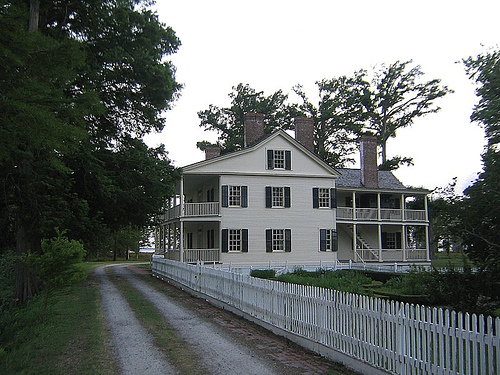
Somerset Place - Creswell, North Carolina

== Attractions ==
- Gravesite of J. Johnston Pettigrew - famous Civil War general who lived in the area
- Somerset Place - former plantation home that now operates as a state historic site
- Pettigrew State Park
- Lake Phelps
- Albemarle Sound
- Pocosin Lakes National Wildlife Refuge
- Davenport Homestead

The town symbol, an artesian well hand-pump, can be found on Main Street in heart of downtown.

== Notable people ==
- Ebenezer Pettigrew - US House of Representatives to the 24th Congress
- Elmo Langley - race car driver and owner, NASCAR pace car driver
- J. Johnston Pettigrew - Confederate general, author and representative to the South Carolina legislature

== Education ==
- Creswell Elementary School
- Creswell High School
- Pocosin Innovative Charter

== Media ==
=== Newspaper ===
Creswell is served by the weekly Roanoke Beacon newspaper from Plymouth, North Carolina, and the daily Washington Daily News from Washington, North Carolina.

=== Television ===
Creswell is part of the Greenville–Washington–New Bern–Morehead City market, which is the 107th largest in 2006, according to Nielsen Media Research. Broadcast television stations serving the market include:

- WUND-TV the (2) Columbia PBS affiliate, (part of the UNC-TV Network)
- WITN-TV the (7) Washington/Greenville/New Bern NBC affiliate
- WFXI-TV the (8) Morehead City Fox affiliate
- WNCT-TV the (9) Greenville CBS affiliate
- WCTI-TV the (12) New Bern ABC affiliate
