= Rehoboth Methodist Church =

Historic church in North Carolina, United States

- U.S. National Register of Historic Places
- Location within North Carolina Location within the United States
- Location: E of Skinnersville on U.S. 64, near Skinnersville, North Carolina
- Coordinates: 35°56′22″N 76°31′23″W
- Area: 2 acres (0.81 ha)
- Built: 1850-1853
- Architectural style: Greek Revival
- NRHP reference No.: 76001349
- Added to NRHP: May 13, 1976

Rehoboth Methodist Church is a historic Methodist church located near Skinnersville, Washington County, North Carolina. It was built between 1850 and 1853, and is a one-story, temple-form, Greek Revival-style frame structure with a front gable roof. It is sheathed in weatherboard and has a pair of double-door entrances.

It was listed on the National Register of Historic Places in 1976.
