= Creswell Historic District =

Historic district in North Carolina, United States

- U.S. National Register of Historic Places
- U.S. Historic district
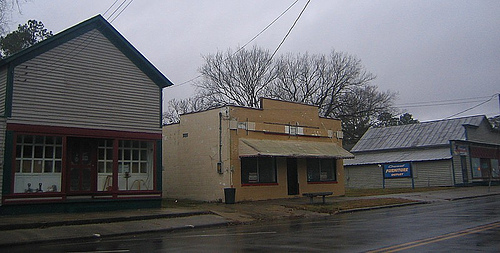
- Davenport's Market, Creswell Historic District, July 2007

- Location within North Carolina Location within the United States
- Location: Roughly bounded by 208 E. Main St. and 310 W. Main St., 302-304 S. Sixth Sts., and 219 N. Sixth St., Creswell, North Carolina
- Coordinates: 35°52′11″N 76°23′38″W
- Area: 23 acres (9.3 ha)
- Built: 1874
- Architectural style: Late Victorian, Late 19th And 20th Century Revivals
- NRHP reference No.: 02001112
- Added to NRHP: October 10, 2002

Plymouth Historic District is a national historic district located at Creswell, Washington County, North Carolina.

== Overview ==
The district encompasses 78 contributing buildings and 3 contributing structures in the central business district and surrounding residential sections of Creswell. It was largely developed between about 1874 and 1952 and includes notable examples of Colonial Revival, American Craftsman and Late Victorian style architecture. Notable buildings include the A. G. Walker Store (c. 1877), A. G. Walker House (1878), Hopkins Hotel (1890), Claude T. Spruill House (1890), Alfred Alexander House (1890), Bateman Store, 0. D. Hatfield Store (c. 1910), Christ Episcopal Church (1898), Creswell Baptist Church (c. 1900), Creswell Episcopal Methodist Church (1918), and Davenport's Market (c. 1935).

It was listed on the National Register of Historic Places in 2002.
