= Perry-Spruill House =

Historic house in North Carolina, United States

- U.S. National Register of Historic Places
- U.S. Historic district – Contributing property
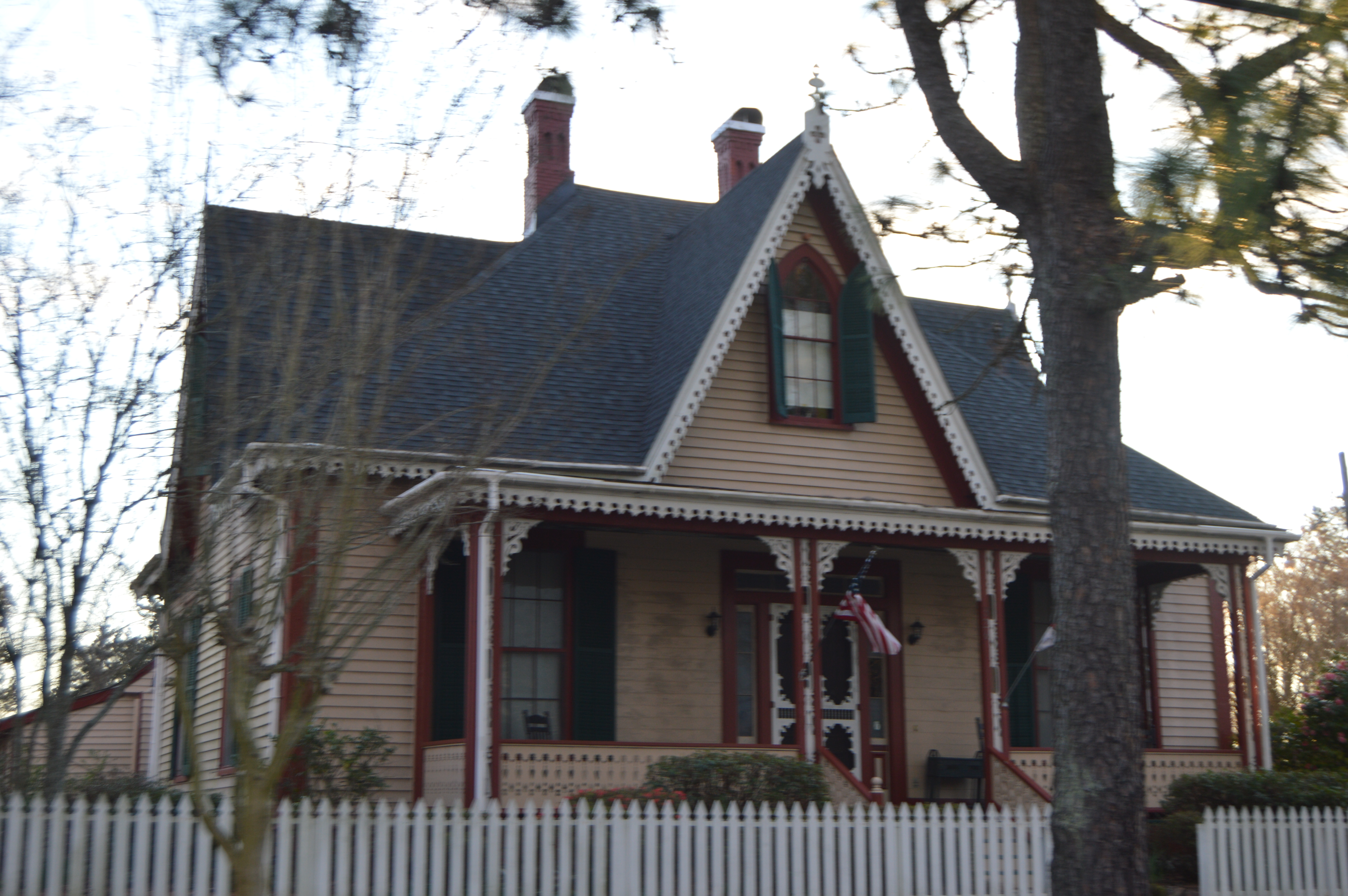
- Facade

- Location within North Carolina Location within the United States
- Location: 326 Washington St., Plymouth, North Carolina
- Coordinates: 35°51′50″N 76°44′57″W
- Area: less than one acre
- Built: 1882-1884
- Built by: Joseph A. Latham
- Architectural style: Carpenter Gothic
- NRHP reference No.: 85000905
- Added to NRHP: April 25, 1985

Perry-Spruill House, also known as Spruill House, is a historic home located at Plymouth, Washington County, North Carolina. It was built between 1882 and 1884, and is a 1 1/2-story, three-bay, Gothic Revival style frame cottage. It has a high hipped roof with intersecting cross gables ornamented with inverted fleur-de-lys sawnwork, a full-width front porch, pointed Gothic windows, and is sheathed in weatherboard.

It was listed on the National Register of Historic Places in 1985. It is located in the Plymouth Historic District.
