= Parry Lodge =

Historic motel-restaurant complex in Kanab, Utah, United States

- U.S. National Register of Historic Places
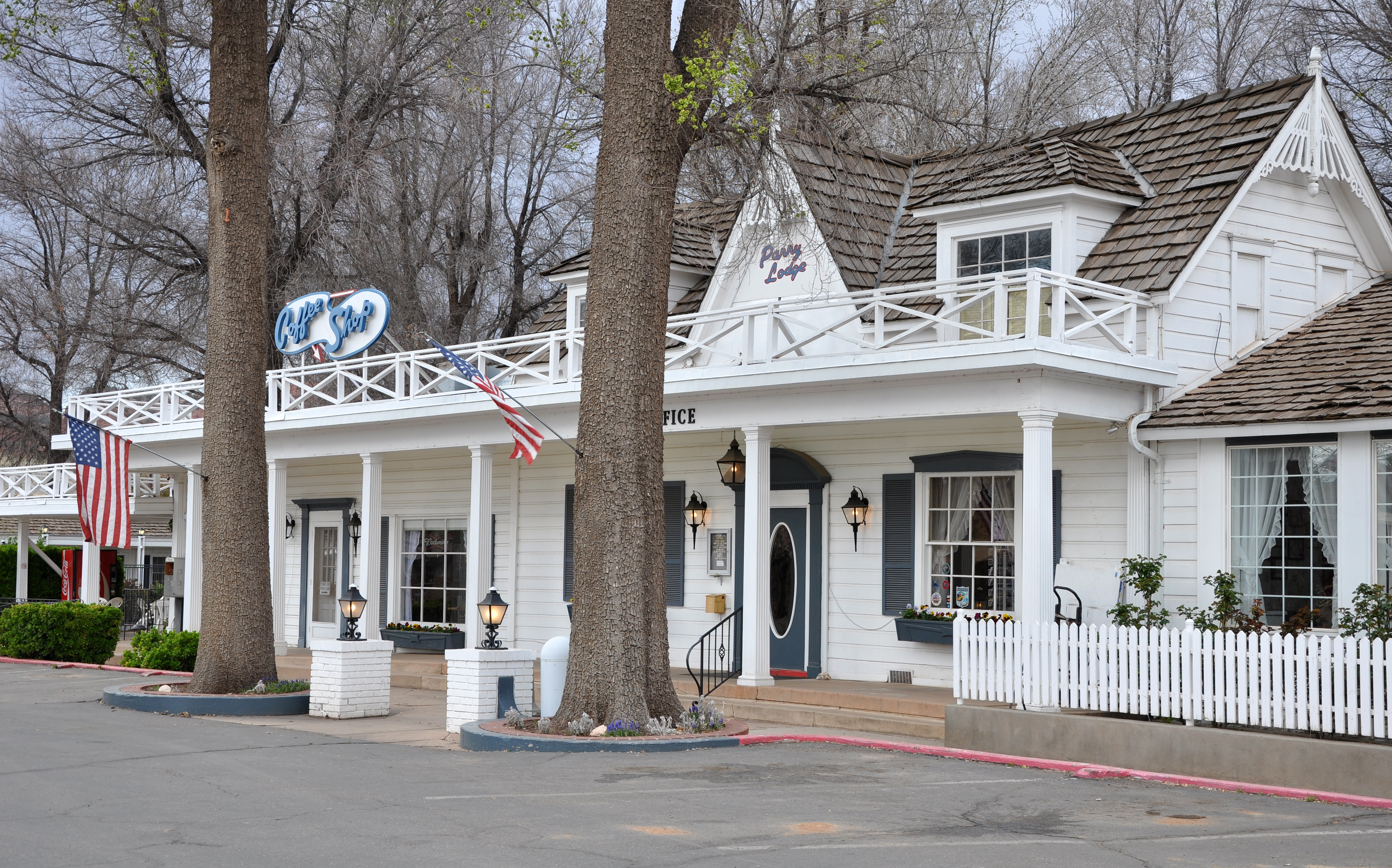
- The building in March 2013

- Location within Utah Location within the United States
- Location: 89 East Center Street, Kanab, Utah
- Coordinates: 37°02′54″N 112°31′34″W
- Area: 3.5 acres (1.4 ha)
- Built: 1930
- Architectural style: Bungalow/craftsman, Victorian Eclectic
- MPS: Kanab, Utah MPS
- NRHP reference No.: 02001734
- Added to NRHP: August 14, 2003

Parry Lodge is a historic motel-restaurant complex in Kanab, Utah, United States, that is listed on the National Register of Historic Places (NRHP).

== Description ==
The complex is located at 89 East Center Street (U.S. Route 89) in Kanab. It is known for having hosted many film crews making Westerns, including many famous movie stars. It contains many photographs of actors who stayed there. Most of the rooms are named after actors.

== History ==
The main building was built in 1892 for Justin Merrill Johnson, the son of Mormon settlers, who lived here with his wife Emma and their five daughters. Johnson built a barn, and a bungalow was built by Gideon Wilson Findlay, who was married to Mandana Farnsworth, a niece of the Johnsons, and lived here with their six daughters. In 1928, the main house was purchased by three brothers from Salt Lake City; Chauncey, Gronway, and Whit Parry, and more buildings were erected on the property in 1930 and 1931 as it was turned into a motel-restaurant complex. The buildings were designed in the American Craftsman and Victorian Eclectic styles. The complex has been listed on the NRHP since August 14, 2003.

== See also ==
- National Register of Historic Places listings in Kane County, Utah
- El Rancho Hotel & Motel
