= Latham House =

Historic house in North Carolina, United States

- U.S. National Register of Historic Places
- U.S. Historic district – Contributing property
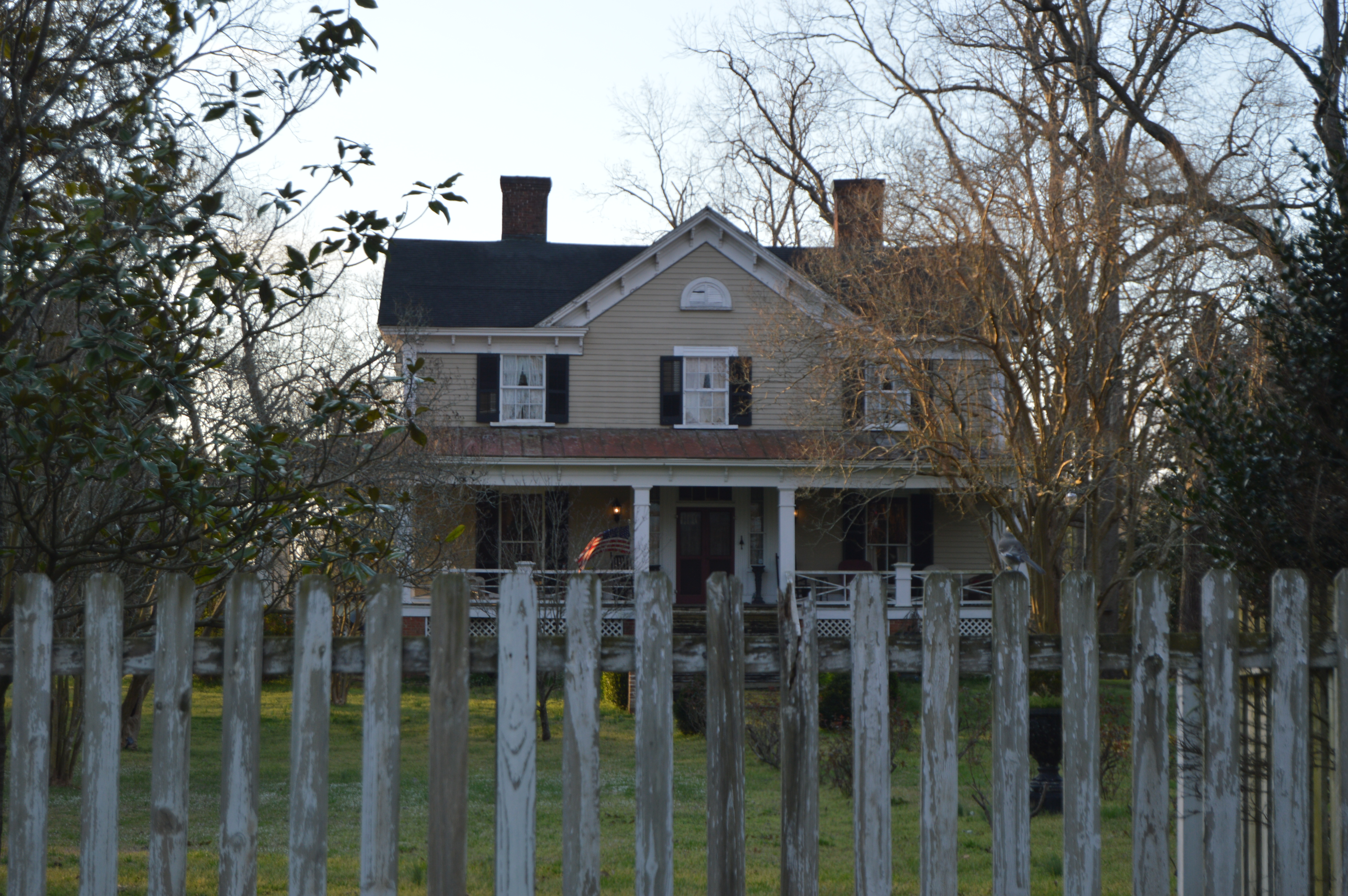
- Front of the house, seen in early morning

- Location within North Carolina Location within the United States
- Location: 311 E. Main St., Plymouth, North Carolina
- Coordinates: 35°52′2″N 76°44′44″W
- Area: 2 acres (0.81 ha)
- Built: c. 1850
- Architectural style: Greek Revival
- NRHP reference No.: 76001348
- Added to NRHP: December 12, 1976

Latham House is a historic home located in Plymouth, Washington County, North Carolina. It was built about 1850, and is a two-story, three bay by two bay Greek Revival style frame dwelling on a high basement. It has a cross-gable roof, hip-roofed wraparound porch, and weatherboard sheathing. Plymouth citizens are believed to have taken refuge in its basement during the Battle of Plymouth in 1864.

It was listed on the National Register of Historic Places in 1976. It is located within the Plymouth Historic District.
