= Washington County Courthouse (North Carolina) =

Historic courthouse in North Carolina, US

- U.S. National Register of Historic Places
- U.S. Historic district – Contributing property
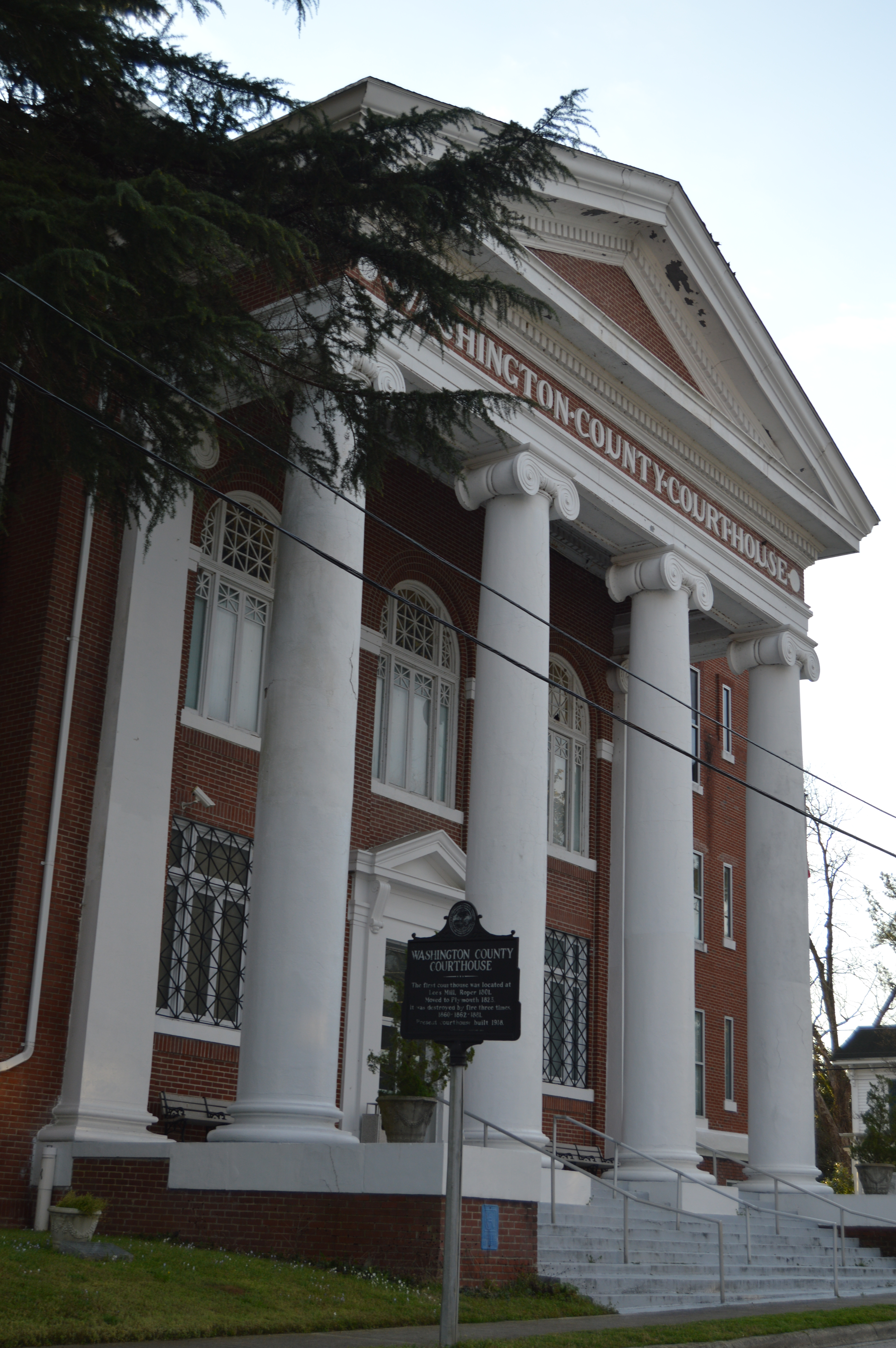

- Location within North Carolina Location within the United States
- Location: Main and Adams Sts., Plymouth, North Carolina
- Coordinates: 35°52′0″N 76°44′57″W
- Area: less than one acre
- Built: 1918-1919
- Architect: Benton & Benton
- Architectural style: Classical Revival
- MPS: North Carolina County Courthouses TR
- NRHP reference No.: 79001761
- Added to NRHP: May 10, 1979

Washington County Courthouse is a historic courthouse located at Plymouth, Washington County, North Carolina. It was designed by the architectural firm of Benton & Benton and built in 1918–1919. It is a three-story, Classical Revival-style brick building with heavy stone trim. The front facade features a monumental tetrastyle Ionic order portico.

It was listed on the National Register of Historic Places in 1979. It is located in the Plymouth Historic District.
