= El Rancho Hotel & Motel =

Historic hotel in the US

- El Rancho Hotel
- U.S. National Register of Historic Places
- NM State Register of Cultural Properties
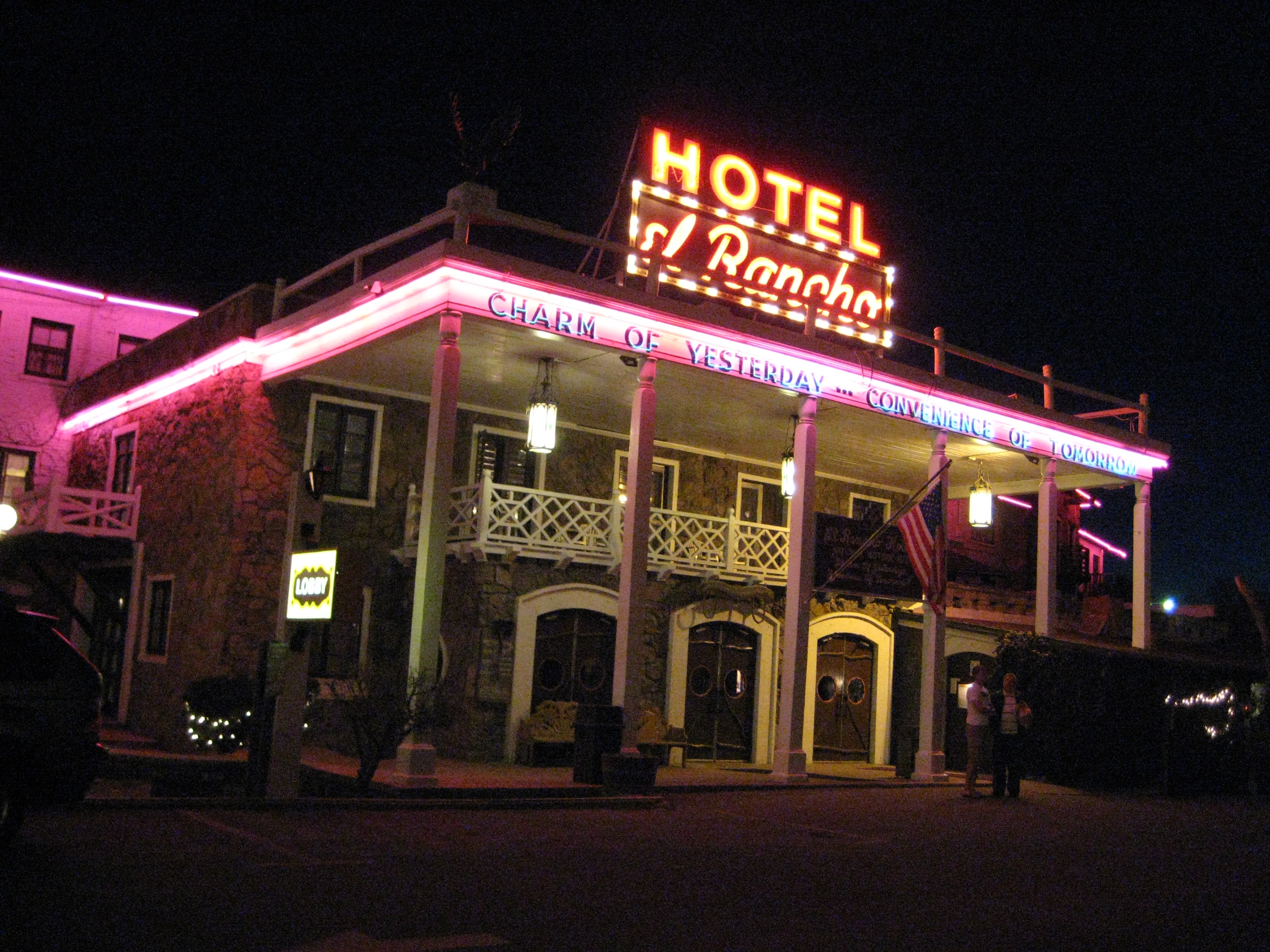
- El Rancho Hotel at night

- Location within New Mexico Location within the United States
- Location: 1000 E. Highway 66, Gallup, New Mexico
- Coordinates: 35°31′46.63596″N 108°43′41.11824″W
- Area: 1 acre (0.40 ha)
- Built: 1936
- Architect: Joe Massagalia
- Architectural style: Rustic
- MPS: Downtown Gallup MRA
- NRHP reference No.: 87002222
- NMSRCP No.: 1190

Significant dates
- Added to NRHP: January 14, 1988
- Designated NMSRCP: September 20, 1985

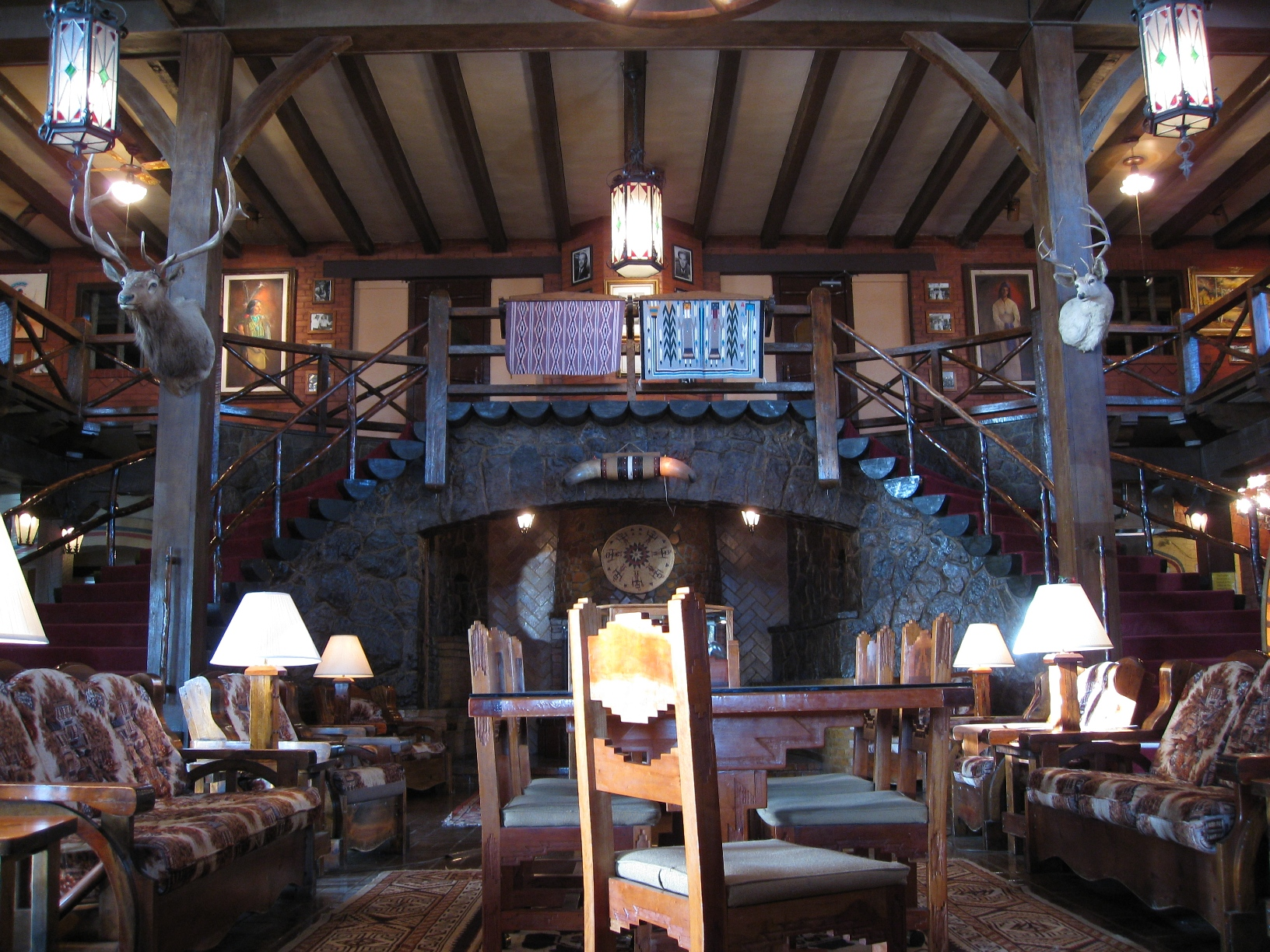
El Rancho Hotel lobby

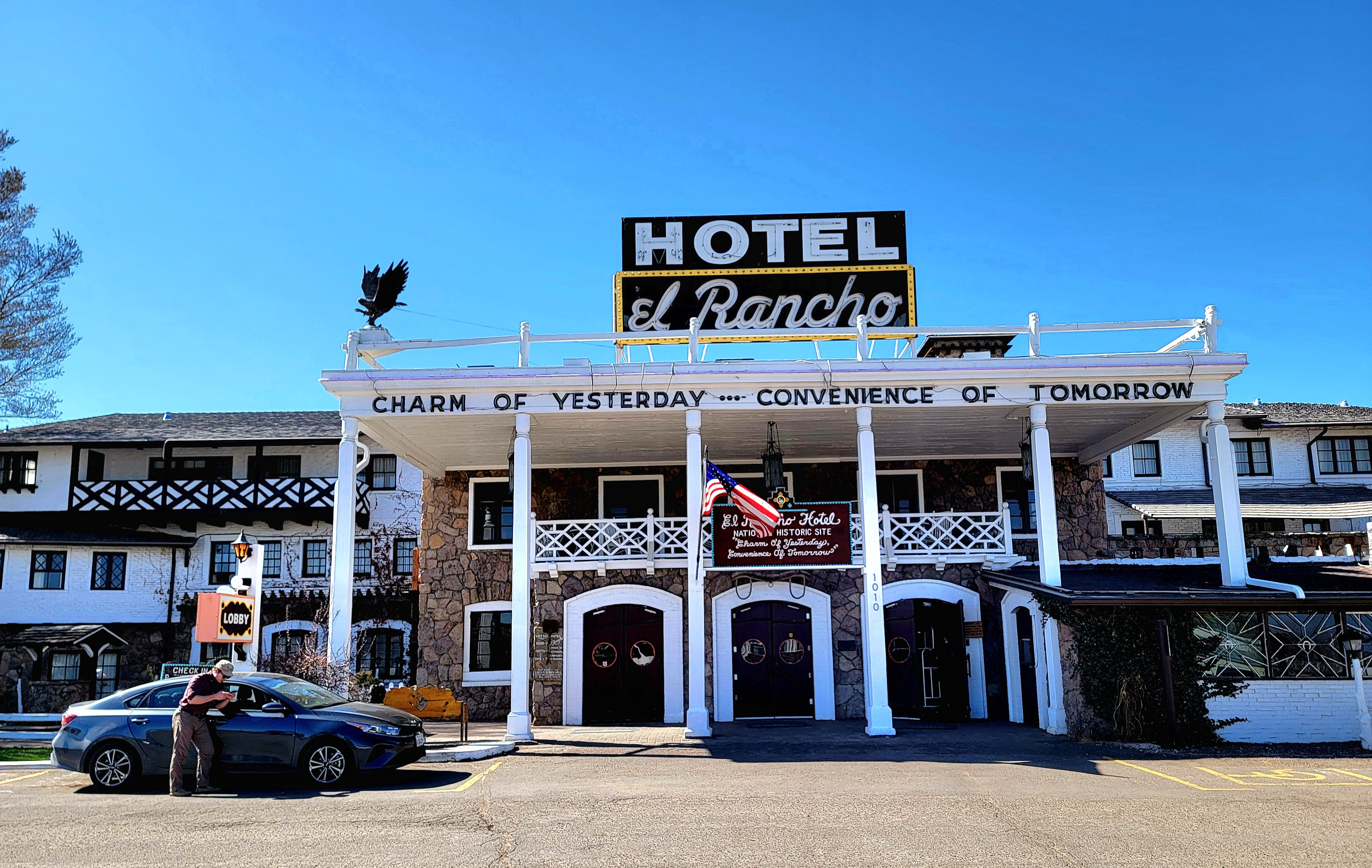
El Rancho entrance in 2024

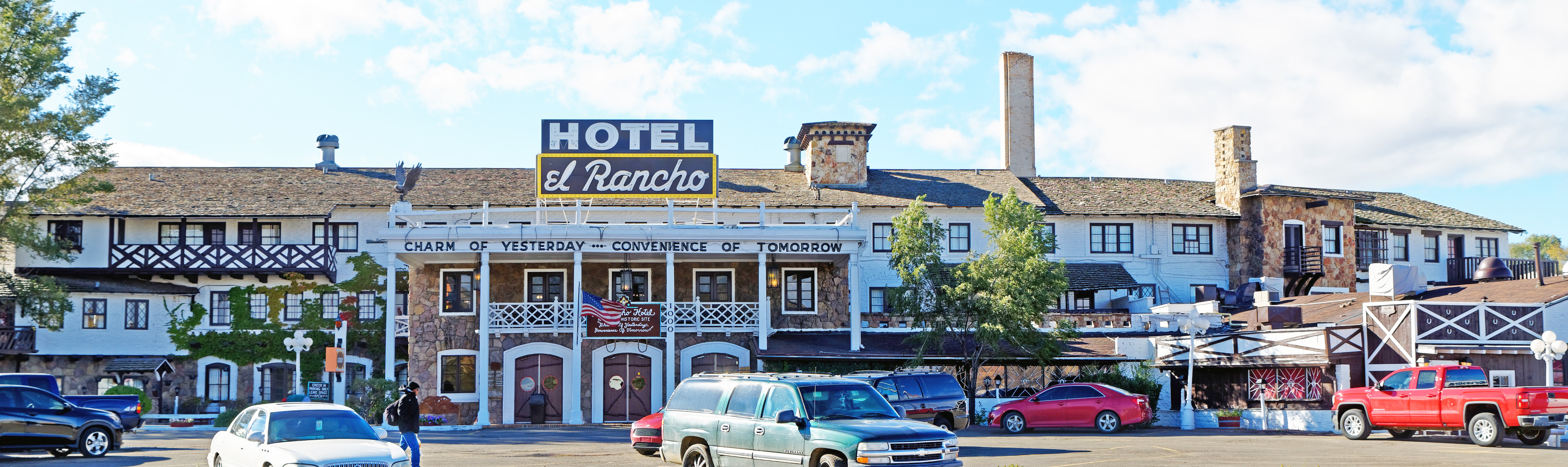
Wide view

El Rancho Hotel, Gallup, New Mexico, is a historic hotel built by R.E. “Griff” Griffith, the brother of film director D.W. Griffith. The brothers encouraged early film production in the surrounding area. It is located on old U.S. Route 66 and became the temporary home for many Hollywood movie stars. The rambling three-story hotel building has a large portico with a central balcony reminiscent of Southern plantation-style architecture. The National Park Service describes the hotel as having a “rusticated fantasy appearance.” The building features brick, random ashlar stone, and rough-hewn wood, along with a wood-shake roof and brick-and-stone chimneys. The lobby features a spectacular hearth-style fireplace made of brick and random ashlar stone surrounded by twin stairways made of split logs that lead to the second floor guest rooms. The slogan “Charm of Yesterday, Convenience of Tomorrow” is rendered in neon above the main entrance.

It is on the Trails of the Ancients Byway, one of the designated New Mexico Scenic Byways.

== History ==
It opened in 1937 as a base for movie productions. Employees were trained by the Fred Harvey Company.

With the opening of Interstate 40, the property fell into decline. Armand Ortega bought the hotel at a bankruptcy auction and restored the property. The Ortega family has a long history dealing in Native American jewelry and artwork in Santa Fe, New Mexico and has operated concessions for the National Park Service at Carlsbad Caverns National Park, White Sands National Park, Death Valley National Park, Hawaiʻi Volcanoes National Park, Muir Woods National Monument, and others.

== Film and entertainment guests ==
Actors and filmmakers stayed at El Rancho while working on productions in and around Gallup. Guests included Lucille Ball, Humphrey Bogart, Joan Crawford, Doris Day, Kirk Douglas, Errol Flynn, Jane Fonda, Betty Grable, Rita Hayworth, Katharine Hepburn, Burt Lancaster, Robert Mitchum, Gregory Peck, Ronald Reagan, Spencer Tracy, Mae West, and John Wayne. Maria Montez, Tom Mix, and Virginia Mayo also stayed there.

The hotel's own guest records also include:

- Alan Ladd
- Barbara Payton
- Betty Hutton
- Billy Wilder
- Broderick Crawford
- Bruce Cabot
- Claude Akins
- Dale Robertson
- Dana Andrews
- Dean Jagger
- Dennis Morgan
- Dorothy Malone
- Elia Kazan
- Forrest Tucker
- Fred MacMurray
- Gene Autry
- Ida Lupino
- Irene Manning
- Jack Benny
- Jack Carson
- Jack Oakie
- Jackie Cooper
- James Cagney
- James Stewart
- Jan Sterling
- Jane Wyman
- Jean Harlow
- Jean Parker
- Joel McCrea
- John Forsythe
- John Hodiak
- José Ferrer
- Joseph Cotten
- Kim Hunter
- Laraine Day
- Lee Marvin
- Lee Remick
- Lizabeth Scott
- Lon Chaney Jr.
- Marilyn Maxwell
- Marx Brothers
- Melvyn Douglas
- Mona Freeman
- Paulette Goddard
- Peter Graves
- Richard Boone
- Robert Taylor
- Rosalind Russell
- Ruth Hussey
- Sydney Greenstreet
- Susan Hayward
- Suzanne Pleshette
- Troy Donahue
- Tyrone Power
- W. C. Fields
- Wallace Beery
- Ward Bond
- William Bendix
- William Holden
- Zachary Scott

Rooms in the main building carry the names of former guests. Photographs of actors and films made near Gallup line the second-floor balcony.

== Film production base ==
El Rancho served as a base for actors and film crews working on location in and around Gallup. The area's rugged landscape was frequently used for Westerns during the 1940s and 1950s, with casts and crews lodging at the hotel during filming. The hotel's close association with location filmmaking continued until the mid-1960s.

Films shot in Gallup or the surrounding area during this period included:

- The Bad Man (1941)
- Sundown (1941)
- The Desert Song (1943)
- Sudan (1945)
- Pursued (1947)
- The Sea of Grass (1947)
- Four Faces West (1948)
- Streets of Laredo (1949)
- Ambush (1950)
- Rocky Mountain (1950)
- Ace in the Hole (1951)
- Fort Defiance (1951)
- New Mexico (1951)
- Only the Valiant (1951)
- Red Mountain (1951)
- Escape from Fort Bravo (1953)
- Fort Massacre (1958)
- A Distant Trumpet (1964)
- The Hallelujah Trail (1965)

The hotel itself was later used as a filming location for the psychological thriller Bottom of the World (2017).

== See also ==
- National Register of Historic Places listings in McKinley County, New Mexico
- List of motels
- Parry Lodge
