= Cullen and Elizabeth Jones House =

Historic house in North Carolina, United States

- U.S. National Register of Historic Places
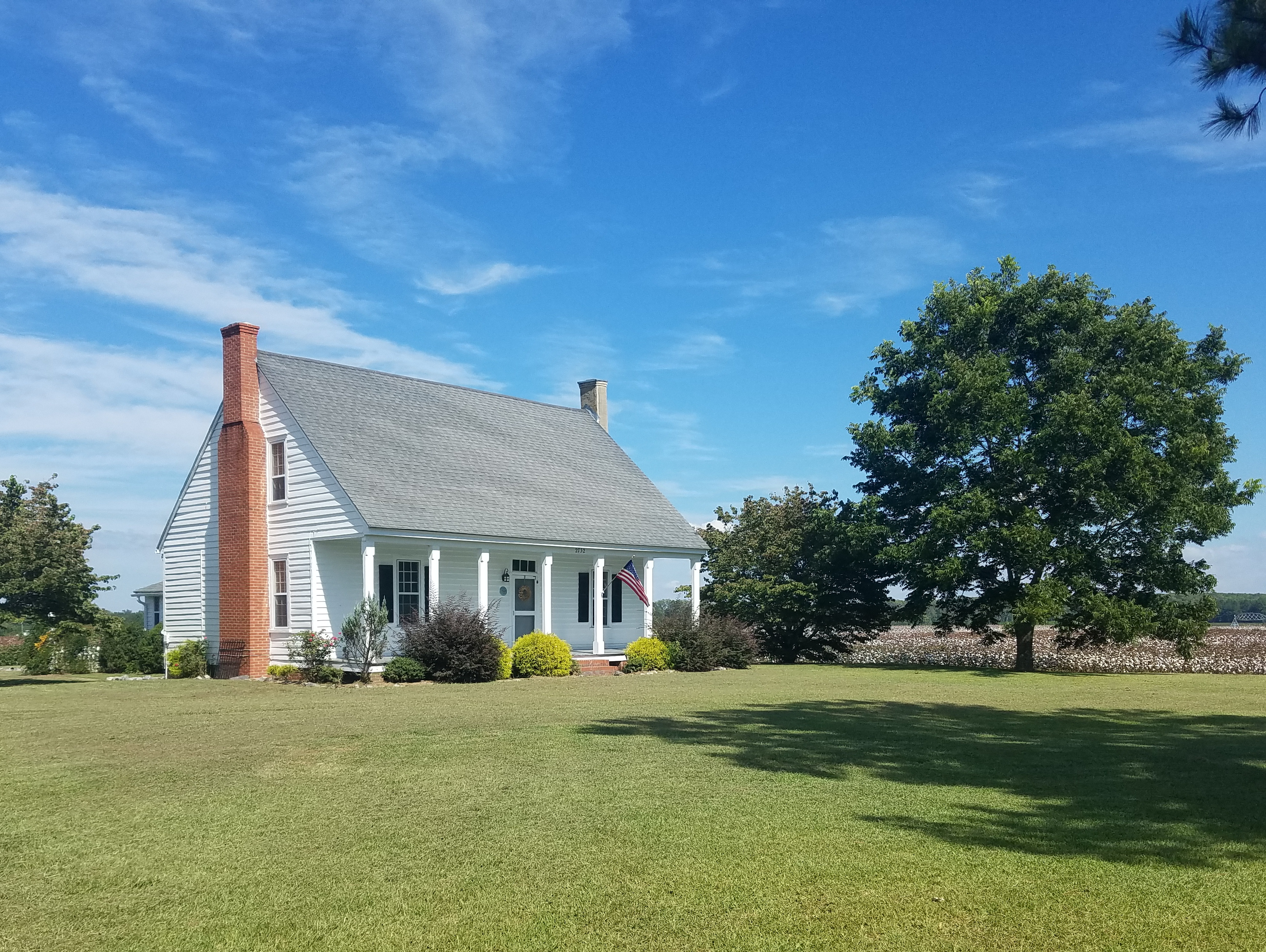

- Location within North Carolina Location within the United States
- Location: 2732 Rocky Hock Rd., near Edenton, North Carolina
- Coordinates: 36°10′57″N 76°41′25″W
- Area: 20 acres (8.1 ha)
- Built: c. 1810, c. 1830-1840, 1894-1906
- Architectural style: vernacular coastal cottage
- NRHP reference No.: 06000340
- Added to NRHP: May 3, 2006

- Cullen and Elizabeth Jones House, also known as Ferry Road Farm, is a historic home located near Edenton, Chowan County, North Carolina. The original section was built about 1810, with later expansions. It is a 1 1/2-story, three-bay, asymmetrical vernacular coastal cottage with an engaged porch across the front façade. The house is of log and heavy timber-frame construction. It has a one-story rear, gable-roof ell and sits on a brick pier foundation. The house served as the post office for the rural community of Rockyhock from 1894 through 1906. Also on the property are a contributing small frame agricultural outbuilding and family cemetery with seven marked graves.

It was listed on the National Register of Historic Places in 2006.
