= Somerset Place =

Historic house in North Carolina, United States

- Somerset Place State Historic Site
- U.S. National Register of Historic Places
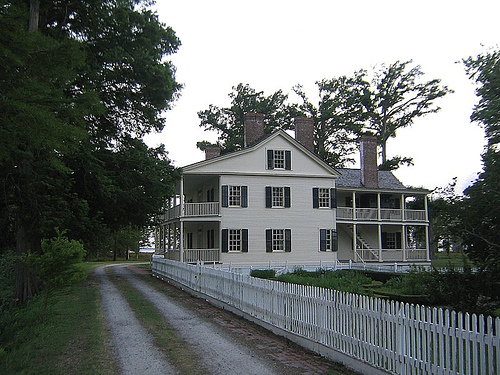
- Somerset Place

- Location within North Carolina Location within the United States
- Location: Pettigrew State Park, near Creswell, North Carolina
- Coordinates: 35°47′16.84″N 76°24′18.38″W
- Area: 7 acres (2.8 ha)
- Built: 1830
- Architectural style: "double-pile" plan
- NRHP reference No.: 70000481
- Added to NRHP: February 26, 1970

Somerset Place is a former plantation near Creswell in Washington County, North Carolina, along the northern shore of Lake Phelps, and now a State Historic Site that belongs to the North Carolina Department of Natural and Cultural Resources. Somerset Place operated as a plantation from 1785 until 1865. Before the end of the American Civil War, Somerset Place had become one of the Upper South's largest plantations.

In 1969, Somerset Place was designated as a State Historic Site. In 1986, descendants of African American slaves from Somerset Place planned a gathering known as Somerset Homecoming. The event inspired a book titled "Somerset Homecoming" written by the property's former manager Dorothy Spruill Redford, who retired in 2008.

Visitors can tour the 1830s period plantation house, the dairy, kitchen/laundry, kitchen rations building, smokehouse and salting house. The site features several reconstructed buildings for the plantation's slaves, including two homes and the plantation hospital; the grounds also include reconstructed stocks like those used to punish slaves.

The visitor center's exhibits display the history of the site and antebellum North Carolina. There is also a gift shop.

Nature trails lead to Pettigrew State Park, which adjoins the site.

Somerset Place contained more than two thousand acres of farmland and another 125,000 acres of cypress and white cedar forests.
