= Plymouth, North Carolina =

- Town
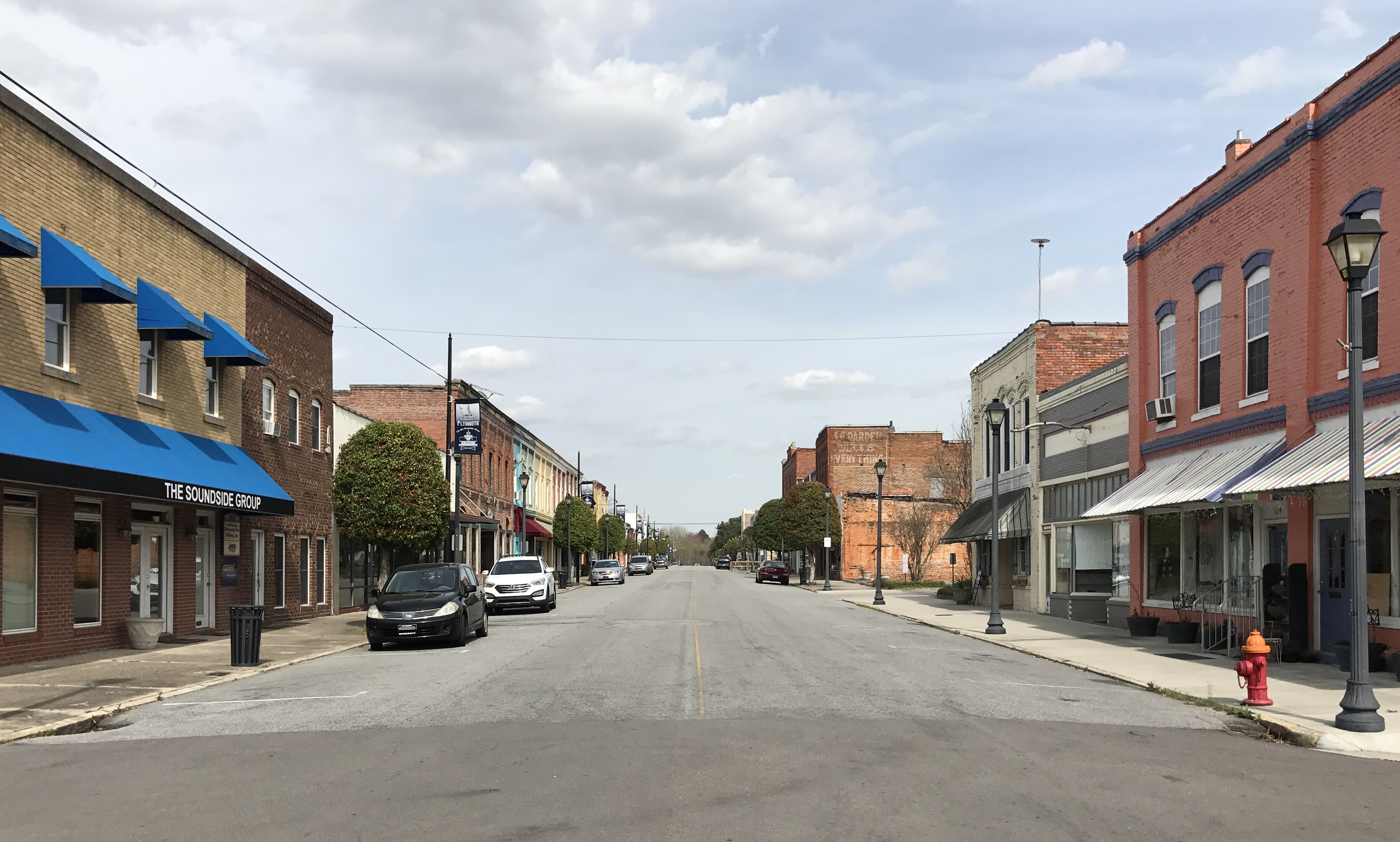
- Downtown Plymouth

- Seal

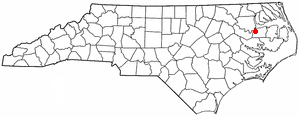
- Location of Plymouth, North Carolina
- Coordinates: 35°51′31″N 76°44′55″W
- Country: United States
- State: North Carolina
- County: Washington

Area
  - Total: 4.03 sq mi (10.45 km^{2})
  - Land: 4.03 sq mi (10.44 km^{2})
  - Water: 0.0039 sq mi (0.01 km^{2})
- Elevation: 13 ft (4.0 m)

Population (2020)
  - Total: 3,320
  - Density: 824.0/sq mi (318.14/km^{2})
- Time zone: UTC-5 (Eastern (EST))
  - Summer (DST): UTC-4 (EDT)
- ZIP code: 27962
- Area code: 252
- FIPS code: 37-53040
- GNIS feature ID: 2407138
- Website: www.visitplymouthnc.com

Established in 1787, Plymouth is the most populous town in Washington County, North Carolina, United States. The population was 3,320 at the 2020 census. It is the county seat of Washington County. Plymouth is located on the Roanoke River about seven miles (11 km) upriver from its mouth into the Albemarle Sound in North Carolina's Inner Banks region.

== Geography ==
According to the United States Census Bureau, the town of Plymouth has a total area of 3.9 square miles (10 km^{2}), of which 3.9 square miles (10 km^{2}) is land and 0.26% is water.

=== Climate ===
Plymouth has a humid subtropical climate (Köppen Cfa) with long, hot summers and short, mild winters.

Climate data for Plymouth 5 E, NC (1991–2020 normals, extremes 1945–present)
| Month | Jan | Feb | Mar | Apr | May | Jun | Jul | Aug | Sep | Oct | Nov | Dec | Year |
|---|---|---|---|---|---|---|---|---|---|---|---|---|---|
| Record high °F (°C) | 81 (27) | 88 (31) | 92 (33) | 95 (35) | 97 (36) | 102 (39) | 102 (39) | 103 (39) | 99 (37) | 95 (35) | 87 (31) | 82 (28) | 103 (39) |
| Mean maximum °F (°C) | 72.6 (22.6) | 75.0 (23.9) | 81.2 (27.3) | 86.7 (30.4) | 91.4 (33.0) | 95.0 (35.0) | 96.1 (35.6) | 94.8 (34.9) | 91.1 (32.8) | 86.4 (30.2) | 79.4 (26.3) | 73.5 (23.1) | 97.4 (36.3) |
| Mean daily maximum °F (°C) | 53.9 (12.2) | 57.4 (14.1) | 64.2 (17.9) | 73.8 (23.2) | 80.2 (26.8) | 86.5 (30.3) | 89.3 (31.8) | 87.6 (30.9) | 82.7 (28.2) | 74.5 (23.6) | 64.3 (17.9) | 56.7 (13.7) | 72.6 (22.6) |
| Daily mean °F (°C) | 43.8 (6.6) | 46.3 (7.9) | 52.5 (11.4) | 61.6 (16.4) | 69.1 (20.6) | 76.5 (24.7) | 79.8 (26.6) | 78.3 (25.7) | 73.3 (22.9) | 63.5 (17.5) | 53.3 (11.8) | 46.7 (8.2) | 62.1 (16.7) |
| Mean daily minimum °F (°C) | 33.6 (0.9) | 35.2 (1.8) | 40.8 (4.9) | 49.4 (9.7) | 58.1 (14.5) | 66.4 (19.1) | 70.4 (21.3) | 69.0 (20.6) | 64.0 (17.8) | 52.6 (11.4) | 42.3 (5.7) | 36.7 (2.6) | 51.5 (10.8) |
| Mean minimum °F (°C) | 15.7 (−9.1) | 20.0 (−6.7) | 24.2 (−4.3) | 32.4 (0.2) | 44.1 (6.7) | 53.6 (12.0) | 61.7 (16.5) | 59.3 (15.2) | 50.7 (10.4) | 35.4 (1.9) | 26.0 (−3.3) | 21.1 (−6.1) | 13.9 (−10.1) |
| Record low °F (°C) | −5 (−21) | 4 (−16) | 15 (−9) | 25 (−4) | 31 (−1) | 42 (6) | 49 (9) | 45 (7) | 36 (2) | 21 (−6) | 14 (−10) | 2 (−17) | −5 (−21) |
| Average precipitation inches (mm) | 3.95 (100) | 3.40 (86) | 4.16 (106) | 3.74 (95) | 4.14 (105) | 5.42 (138) | 5.70 (145) | 6.60 (168) | 6.13 (156) | 4.14 (105) | 3.57 (91) | 3.64 (92) | 54.59 (1,387) |
| Average snowfall inches (cm) | 1.0 (2.5) | 0.3 (0.76) | 0.0 (0.0) | 0.0 (0.0) | 0.0 (0.0) | 0.0 (0.0) | 0.0 (0.0) | 0.0 (0.0) | 0.0 (0.0) | 0.0 (0.0) | 0.0 (0.0) | 0.1 (0.25) | 1.4 (3.6) |
| Average precipitation days (≥ 0.01 in) | 12.4 | 10.9 | 11.4 | 10.4 | 11.3 | 11.1 | 12.7 | 12.9 | 11.2 | 9.9 | 10.2 | 11.5 | 135.9 |
| Average snowy days (≥ 0.1 in) | 0.3 | 0.1 | 0.0 | 0.0 | 0.0 | 0.0 | 0.0 | 0.0 | 0.0 | 0.0 | 0.0 | 0.2 | 0.6 |
Source: NOAA

== Demographics ==
Historical population
| Census | Pop. | Note | %± |
|---|---|---|---|
| 1850 | 951 | | — |
| 1860 | 872 | | −8.3% |
| 1870 | 1,389 | | 59.3% |
| 1880 | 836 | | −39.8% |
| 1890 | 1,212 | | 45.0% |
| 1900 | 1,011 | | −16.6% |
| 1910 | 2,165 | | 114.1% |
| 1920 | 1,847 | | −14.7% |
| 1930 | 2,139 | | 15.8% |
| 1940 | 2,461 | | 15.1% |
| 1950 | 4,486 | | 82.3% |
| 1960 | 4,666 | | 4.0% |
| 1970 | 4,774 | | 2.3% |
| 1980 | 4,571 | | −4.3% |
| 1990 | 4,328 | | −5.3% |
| 2000 | 4,107 | | −5.1% |
| 2010 | 3,878 | | −5.6% |
| 2020 | 3,320 | | −14.4% |
U.S. Decennial Census

=== Racial and ethnic composition ===
Plymouth town, North Carolina – Racial and ethnic composition Note: the US Census treats Hispanic/Latino as an ethnic category. This table excludes Latinos from the racial categories and assigns them to a separate category. Hispanics/Latinos may be of any race.
| Race / Ethnicity (NH = Non-Hispanic) | Pop 2000 | Pop 2010 | Pop 2020 | % 2000 | % 2010 | % 2020 |
|---|---|---|---|---|---|---|
| White alone (NH) | 1,422 | 1,119 | 887 | 34.62% | 28.86% | 26.72% |
| Black or African American alone (NH) | 2,583 | 2,647 | 2,259 | 62.89% | 68.26% | 68.04% |
| Native American or Alaska Native alone (NH) | 1 | 15 | 3 | 0.02% | 0.39% | 0.09% |
| Asian alone (NH) | 24 | 15 | 12 | 0.58% | 0.39% | 0.36% |
| Native Hawaiian or Pacific Islander alone (NH) | 0 | 0 | 2 | 0.00% | 0.00% | 0.06% |
| Other race alone (NH) | 2 | 2 | 17 | 0.05% | 0.05% | 0.51% |
| Mixed race or Multiracial (NH) | 21 | 35 | 83 | 0.51% | 0.90% | 2.50% |
| Hispanic or Latino (any race) | 54 | 45 | 57 | 1.31% | 1.16% | 1.72% |
| Total | 4,107 | 3,878 | 3,320 | 100.00% | 100.00% | 100.00% |

=== 2020 census ===
As of the 2020 census, Plymouth had a population of 3,320. The median age was 44.7 years. 23.8% of residents were under the age of 18 and 23.1% of residents were 65 years of age or older. For every 100 females there were 79.2 males, and for every 100 females age 18 and over there were 74.2 males age 18 and over.

There were 1,420 households in Plymouth, of which 30.3% had children under the age of 18 living in them. Of all households, 26.9% were married-couple households, 19.2% were households with a male householder and no spouse or partner present, and 48.4% were households with a female householder and no spouse or partner present. About 35.5% of all households were made up of individuals and 17.9% had someone living alone who was 65 years of age or older. There were 678 families residing in the town.

There were 1,755 housing units, of which 19.1% were vacant. The homeowner vacancy rate was 1.7% and the rental vacancy rate was 6.8%.

0.0% of residents lived in urban areas, while 100.0% lived in rural areas.

=== 2010 census ===
As of the 2010 United States census, there were 3,878 people living in the town. The racial makeup of the town was 68.3% Black, 28.9% White, 0.4% Native American, 0.4% Asian, 0.1% from some other race and 0.9% of two or more races. 1.2% were Hispanic or Latino of any race.

=== 2000 census ===
As of the census of 2000, there were 4,107 people, 1,623 households, and 1,119 families living in the town. The population density was 1,061.7 inhabitants per square mile (409.9/km^{2}). There were 1,829 housing units at an average density of 472.8 per square mile (182.5/km^{2}). The racial makeup of the town was 35.04% White, 63.09% African American, 0.02% Native American, 0.61% Asian, 0.73% from other races, and 0.51% from two or more races. Hispanic or Latino of any race were 1.31% of the population.

There were 1,623 households, out of which 33.1% had children under the age of 18 living with them, 39.1% were married couples living together, 27.2% had a female householder with no husband present, and 31.0% were non-families. 28.7% of all households were made up of individuals, and 14.8% had someone living alone who was 65 years of age or older. The average household size was 2.43 and the average family size was 2.99.

In the town, the population was spread out, with 28.6% under the age of 18, 7.5% from 18 to 24, 23.0% from 25 to 44, 23.1% from 45 to 64, and 17.8% who were 65 years of age or older. The median age was 38 years. For every 100 females, there were 77.9 males. For every 100 females age 18 and over, there were 71.0 males.

The median income for a household in the town was $17,281, and the median income for a family was $26,800. Males had a median income of $26,352 versus $17,350 for females. The per capita income for the town was $12,067. About 30.8% of families and 37.5% of the population were below the poverty line, including 54.3% of those under age 18 and 28.8% of those age 65 or over.

== History ==
The Moratuc tribe of American Indians was living in a large settlement on Welch Creek near the current Domtar pulp mill site in 1585 when the area was explored by English settlers. Moratuc was an Indian name for the Roanoke River. The Moratuc tribe were probably an Algonquian tribe, but there is debate that they may have been Iroquois.

Plymouth was established in 1787 by Arthur Rhodes on 100 acres (0.40 km^{2}) of his Brick House plantation he subdivided into 172 lots. Note that "Brickhouse" is a common local patronym. Plymouth was once one of North Carolina’s largest seaports. In 1790, the North Carolina General Assembly named Plymouth a "port of delivery" and in 1808 it was named a "port of entry". The county seat of Washington County was moved to Plymouth from Lee's Mill, as Roper, North Carolina, was then known, by special act of the General Assembly on January 31, 1823. A new courthouse was completed by November 1824 on the same site where the present courthouse stands. It stood until 1862 when it caught fire and burned to the ground from a shell fired by a Union gunboat during bombardment of Plymouth.

Plymouth has the historical distinction of being the site of the second-largest battle in North Carolina and its last Confederate victory, the Battle of Plymouth (1864), during the American Civil War. The Confederate ironclad warship CSS Albemarle — and its eventual sinking on October 27, 1864, while moored at a dock in Plymouth — are the centerpieces of this history.

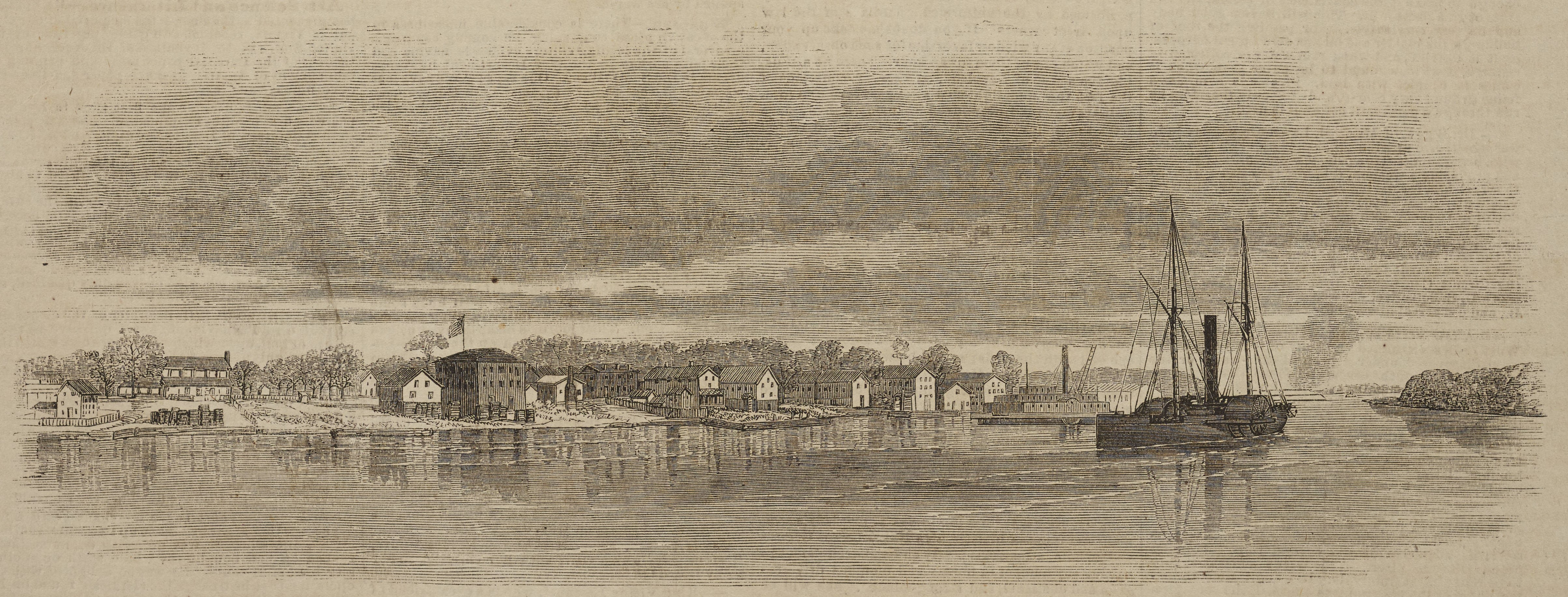
Plymouth in 1864

Beginning early in the war and for its remainder, the Union controlled the Albemarle and Pamlico Sounds. The geographical importance for the Northern forces of Plymouth's location at the mouth of the Roanoke River was the Union desire to push upriver and capture the vital Wilmington and Weldon Railroad line passing through Weldon, North Carolina, which would completely cut off the major supply line for General Robert E. Lee's army in Virginia from more southerly ports. This would essentially end all materiel support for Lee's forces and force his defeat or retreat from Virginia.

Fort Branch, located upriver at Hamilton, successfully blocked the Union gunboats and troops sailing upstream from Plymouth at the river bend called Rainbow Branch. The fort held until April 10, 1865, one day after General Lee surrendered at Appomattox Courthouse, Virginia, at which point it was abandoned and its cannons were hurled into the Roanoke River. Thus, the war histories of Fort Branch and Plymouth are intimately connected.

Plymouth State Normal School was established in 1881 to educate African American teachers. It was moved to Elizabeth City in 1903 and became Elizabeth City State University.

The Port O'Plymouth History Museum, located in the circa 1923 former Atlantic Coast Line Railroad station in downtown Plymouth, has a nationally recognized collection of Civil War artifacts, including one of the most complete belt-buckle and button collections in the U.S. and a model of the ironclad ram CSS Albemarle.

The Garrett's Island House, Latham House, Perry-Spruill House, Plymouth Historic District, and Washington County Courthouse, New Chapel Missionary Baptist Church are listed on the National Register of Historic Places.

== Economy ==
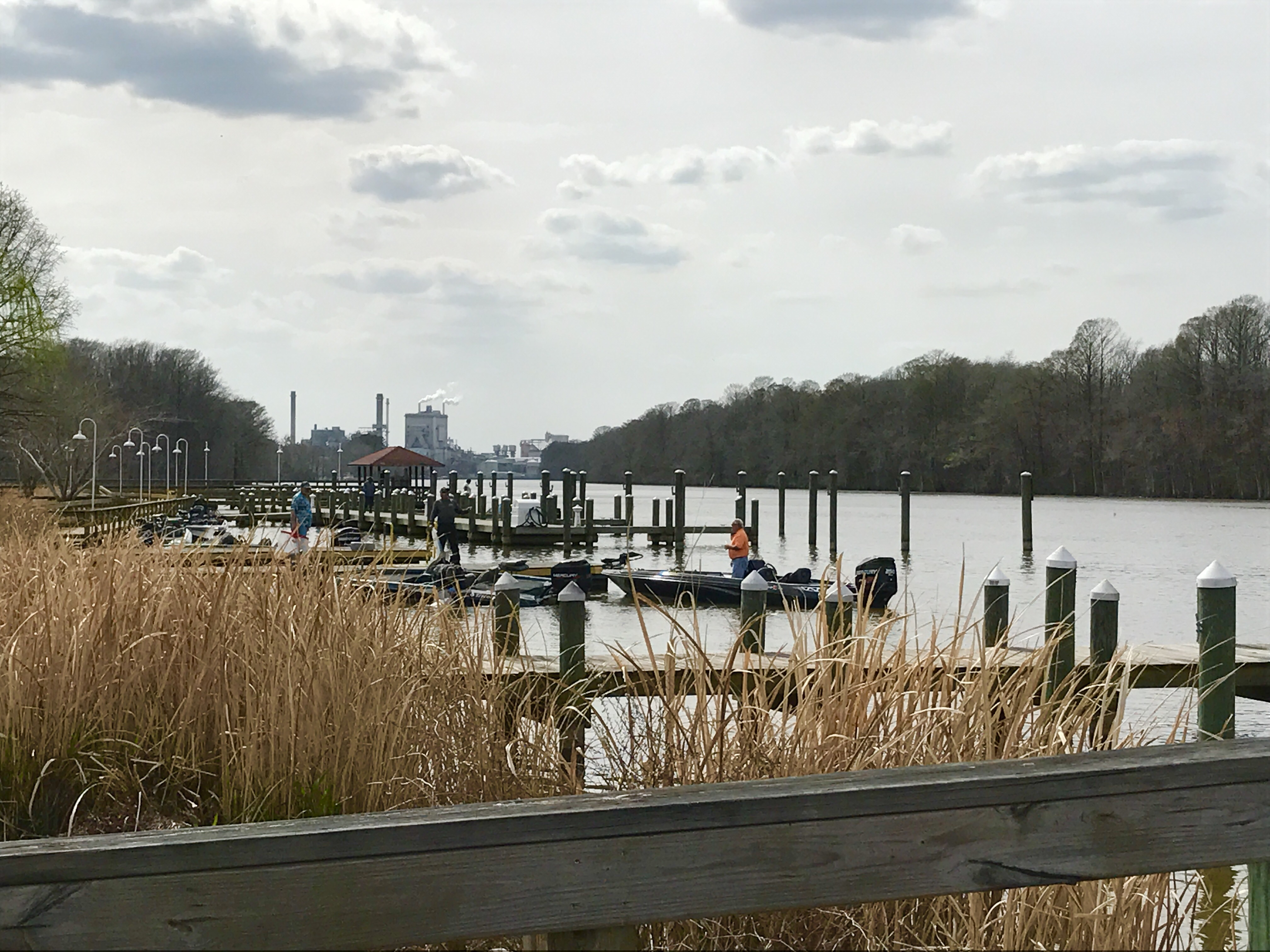
The Roanoke River in Plymouth. The Domtar facility is in the background.

The primary industry for the area is Domtar Paper Company, LLC., a paper manufacturer. The paper mill and its related facilities have been the largest employer since 1937. It was owned by Kieckhefer Container Company (John W. Kieckhefer) which was merged into Weyerhauser in 1957. In March 2007, Weyerhauser sold its paper interests to Domtar. The paper mill is now a Domtar papermill, while the onsite sawmill is still owned by Weyerhauser. In October 2009, Domtar announced the end of paper machine operations, and the mill will be converted to produce fluff pulp alone, with a 33% workforce reduction to about 360 employees.

The town is re-branding itself as a tourist destination to offset the reduction in paper-making employment, taking advantage of its natural environment, being surrounded by tracts of forests and swamplands. A riverfront boardwalk has been built, with views of the Roanoke River. Plymouth is home to the North Carolina Black Bear Festival, an annual three-day event at the beginning of June centered around bears.

== Education ==
- Pines Elementary School (now closed)
- Plymouth High School (now closed)
- Pocosin Innovative Charter
- Washington County Elementary School
- Washington County Middle School
- Washington County High School
- Washington County Early College High School

== Notable people ==
- Aaron Anderson (1811–1886), sailor
- Charles Bowser (born 1959), former NFL player
- Don Brown (born 1960), author, attorney, former naval officer
- Augustin Daly (1838–1899), Playwright, drama critic, theatrical owner and manager
- Louis C. Latham (1840–1895), member of the United States House of Representatives
- Jacklyn H. Lucas (1928–2008), marine and Medal of Honor recipient
- Lowes Moore (born 1957), basketball player
- Rodney Purvis (born 1994), basketball player
- John Bunyan Respess (1833 – 1909), politician and member of the North Carolina Senate
- Reddy Rowe (1887–1966), football and baseball player and coach
- J. B. Smoove (born 1965), actor and comedian
- Frederick W. Wurster (1850–1917), Mayor of Brooklyn (1896–1897)
