= Washington County, North Carolina =

County in North Carolina, United States

- County
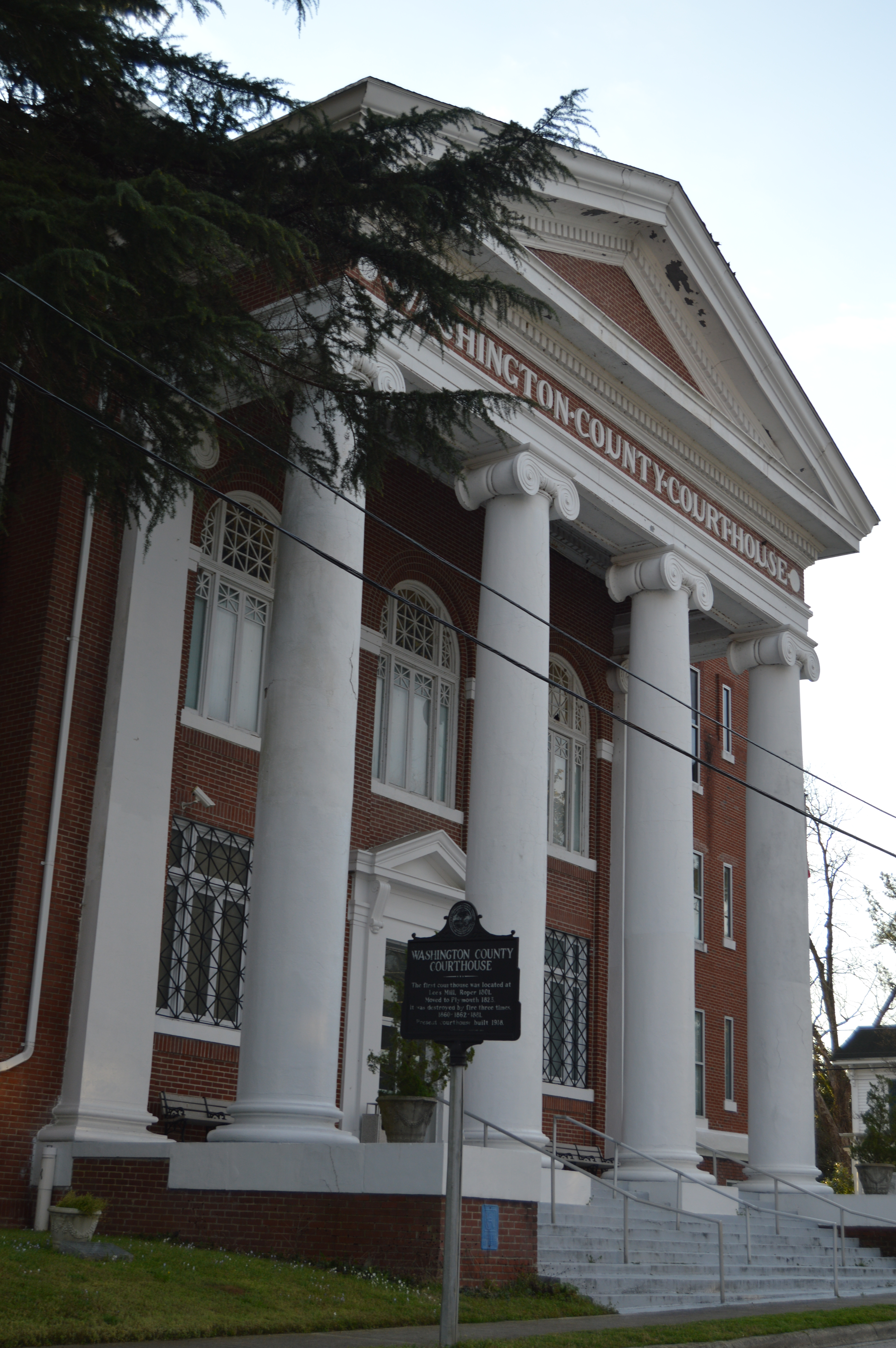
- Washington County Courthouse

- Seal Logo
- Nickname: Bear-Olina
- Motto(s): "Where traffic ends and adventure begins."
- Location within the U.S. state of North Carolina
- Coordinates: 35.84°N 76.57°W
- Country: United States
- State: North Carolina
- Founded: 1799
- Named for: George Washington
- Seat: Plymouth
- Largest community: Plymouth

Area
  - Total: 421.91 sq mi (1,092.7 km^{2})
  - Land: 346.51 sq mi (897.5 km^{2})
  - Water: 75.40 sq mi (195.3 km^{2}) 17.87%

Population (2020)
  - Total: 11,003
  - Estimate (2025): 10,638 ▼
  - Density: 31.754/sq mi (12.260/km^{2})
- Time zone: UTC−5 (Eastern)
  - Summer (DST): UTC−4 (EDT)
- Congressional district: 1st
- Website: www.washconc.org

Washington County is a county located in the U.S. state of North Carolina. As of the 2020 census, the population was 11,003. Its county seat is Plymouth. The county was formed in 1799 from the western third of Tyrrell County. It was named for George Washington.

== History ==
There are three incorporated towns in Washington County; Plymouth is the county seat, while other towns are Roper and Creswell. Washington County is known for rich farmland, extensive forests and abundant public access waters. The Roanoke River and Albemarle Sound form the northern boundary. Lake Phelps is 16,000 acres and is part of Pettigrew State Park in Creswell. Somerset Place is a restored antebellum plantation and NC Historic Site on Lake Phelps.

The Pungo Unit of the Pocosin Lakes National Wildlife Refuge in the southern part of the county is said to have the best public black bear viewing in North Carolina. This part of the state is known for having the world's largest black bears and highest black bear densities. The award-winning NC Black Bear Festival takes place in Plymouth on the first weekend in June.

== Geography ==
Interactive map of Washington County

According to the U.S. Census Bureau, the county has a total area of 421.91 square miles (1,092.7 km^{2}), of which 346.51 square miles (897.5 km^{2}) is land and 75.40 square miles (195.3 km^{2}) (17.87%) is water. The county borders the Albemarle Sound.

=== National protected area ===
- Pocosin Lakes National Wildlife Refuge (part)

=== State and local protected areas/sites ===
- Bachelor Bay Game Land (part)
- Lantern Acres Game Land (part)
- Latham House
- Pettigrew State Park (part)
- Somerset Place
- Van Swamp Game Lands (part)

=== Major water bodies ===
- Albemarle Sound
- Lake Phelps
- Pungo River
- Roanoke River

=== Adjacent counties ===
- Chowan County – north
- Perquimans County – northeast
- Tyrrell County – east
- Hyde County – southeast
- Beaufort County – southwest
- Martin County – west
- Bertie County – northwest

=== Major highways ===
- US 64
- NC 32
- NC 37
- NC 45
- NC 94
- NC 99
- NC 149
- NC 308

== Demographics ==
Historical population
Census	Pop.	Note	%±
1800	2,422		—
1810	3,464		43.0%
1820	3,986		15.1%
1830	4,552		14.2%
1840	4,525		−0.6%
1850	5,664		25.2%
1860	6,357		12.2%
1870	6,516		2.5%
1880	8,928		37.0%
1890	10,200		14.2%
1900	10,608		4.0%
1910	11,062		4.3%
1920	11,429		3.3%
1930	11,603		1.5%
1940	12,323		6.2%
1950	13,180		7.0%
1960	13,488		2.3%
1970	14,038		4.1%
1980	14,801		5.4%
1990	13,997		−5.4%
2000	13,723		−2.0%
2010	13,228		−3.6%
2020	11,003		−16.8%
2025 (est.)	10,638	▼	−3.3%
U.S. Decennial Census; 1790–1960 1900–1990; 1990–2000 2010 2020

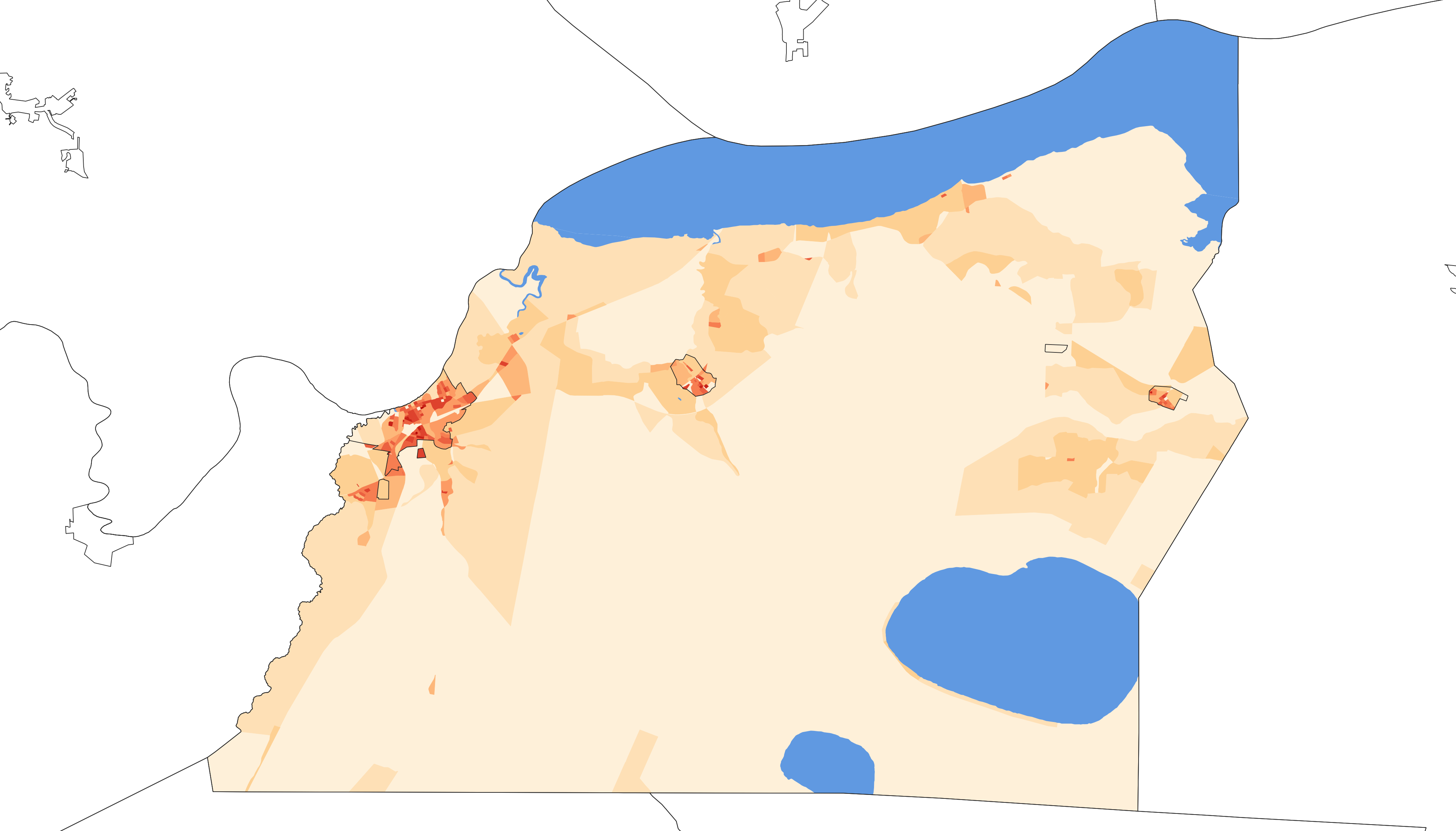
2020 population density of Washington County NC by census block

=== 2020 census ===
As of the 2020 census, there were 11,003 people, 4,871 households, and 2,655 families residing in the county. The median age was 49.9 years, 19.6% of residents were under the age of 18, and 26.5% were 65 years of age or older; for every 100 females there were 85.9 males and for every 100 females age 18 and over there were 83.3 males age 18 and over.

The racial makeup of the county was 45.4% White, 48.9% Black or African American, 0.2% American Indian and Alaska Native, 0.3% Asian, 0.1% Native Hawaiian and Pacific Islander, 2.0% from some other race, and 3.1% from two or more races. Hispanic or Latino residents of any race comprised 3.4% of the population.

<0.1% of residents lived in urban areas, while 100.0% lived in rural areas.

Of these households, 25.5% had children under the age of 18 living in them, 38.1% were married-couple households, 19.3% were households with a male householder and no spouse or partner present, and 37.6% were households with a female householder and no spouse or partner present. About 32.9% of all households were made up of individuals and 17.2% had someone living alone who was 65 years of age or older.

There were 6,039 housing units, of which 19.3% were vacant. Among occupied housing units, 68.1% were owner-occupied and 31.9% were renter-occupied. The homeowner vacancy rate was 1.1% and the rental vacancy rate was 7.9%.

=== Racial and ethnic composition ===
Washington County, North Carolina – Racial and ethnic composition Note: the US Census treats Hispanic/Latino as an ethnic category. This table excludes Latinos from the racial categories and assigns them to a separate category. Hispanics/Latinos may be of any race.
Race / Ethnicity (NH = Non-Hispanic)	Pop 1980	Pop 1990	Pop 2000	Pop 2010	Pop 2020	% 1980	% 1990	% 2000	% 2010	% 2020
White alone (NH)	8,317	7,531	6,555	5,998	4,958	56.19%	53.80%	47.77%	45.34%	45.06%
Black or African American alone (NH)	6,304	6,351	6,702	6,567	5,350	42.59%	45.37%	48.84%	49.64%	48.62%
Native American or Alaska Native alone (NH)	6	8	7	21	15	0.04%	0.06%	0.05%	0.16%	0.14%
Asian alone (NH)	24	34	43	38	37	0.16%	0.24%	0.31%	0.29%	0.34%
Native Hawaiian or Pacific Islander alone (NH)	x	x	6	1	3	x	x	0.04%	0.01%	0.03%
Other race alone (NH)	13	8	12	14	36	0.09%	0.06%	0.09%	0.11%	0.33%
Mixed race or Multiracial (NH)	x	x	87	123	233	x	x	0.63%	0.93%	2.12%
Hispanic or Latino (any race)	137	65	311	466	371	0.93%	0.46%	2.27%	3.52%	3.37%
Total	14,801	13,997	13,723	13,228	11,003	100.00%	100.00%	100.00%	100.00%	100.00%

Washington County, North Carolina – Racial Composition Note: the U.S. census treats Hispanic/Latino as an ethnic category. This table includes Latinos in the racial categories and does not delineate them separately. Hispanics/Latinos may be of any race.
Race	Pop 2010	Pop 2020	% 2010	% 2020
White alone	6,084	4,999	45.99%	45.43%
Black or African American alone	6,587	5,375	49.80%	48.85%
Native American or Alaska Native alone	24	23	0.18%	0.21%
Asian alone (NH)	38	37	0.29%	0.34%
Pacific Islander alone	1	9	0.01%	0.08%
Other race alone	340	223	2.57%	2.03%
Mixed Race or Multiracial	154	337	1.16%	3.06%
Total	13,228	11,003	100.00%	100.00%

=== 2000 census ===
At the 2000 census, there were 13,723 people, 5,367 households, and 3,907 families residing in the county. The population density was 39 people per square mile (15 people/km^{2}). There were 6,174 housing units at an average density of 18 units per square mile (6.9 units/km^{2}). The racial makeup of the county was 48.28% White, 48.94% Black or African American, 0.05% Native American, 0.32% Asian, 0.04% Pacific Islander, 1.66% from other races, and 0.70% from two or more races. 2.27% of the population were Hispanic or Latino of any race.

There were 5,367 households, out of which 31.70% had children under the age of 18 living with them, 50.10% were married couples living together, 18.80% had a female householder with no husband present, and 27.20% were non-families. 24.70% of all households were made up of individuals, and 11.70% had someone living alone who was 65 years of age or older. The average household size was 2.52 and the average family size was 2.99.

In the county, the population was spread out, with 26.00% under the age of 18, 7.70% from 18 to 24, 25.00% from 25 to 44, 25.80% from 45 to 64, and 15.50% who were 65 years of age or older. The median age was 39 years. For every 100 females there were 89.70 males. For every 100 females age 18 and over, there were 86.10 males.

The median income for a household in the county was $28,865, and the median income for a family was $34,888. Males had a median income of $27,058 versus $19,477 for females. The per capita income for the county was $14,994. About 17.60% of families and 21.80% of the population were below the poverty line, including 31.50% of those under age 18 and 19.20% of those age 65 or over.

== Government and politics ==
Washington County is a member of the Albemarle Commission regional council of governments.

Washington County was one of the proposed sites for a Navy outlying landing field. This practice airfield would allow pilots to simulate landings on an aircraft carrier. Plans for construction have been scrapped due to public backlash and potential ecological impact.

United States presidential election results for Washington County, North Carolina
Year	Republican		Democratic		Third party(ies)	
Year	No.	%	No.	%	No.	%
1912	384	37.07%	503	48.55%	149	14.38%
1916	486	42.74%	651	57.26%	0	0.00%
1920	971	46.53%	1,116	53.47%	0	0.00%
1924	834	48.40%	883	51.25%	6	0.35%
1928	1,183	56.85%	898	43.15%	0	0.00%
1932	619	26.77%	1,681	72.71%	12	0.52%
1936	535	22.20%	1,875	77.80%	0	0.00%
1940	362	17.35%	1,724	82.65%	0	0.00%
1944	497	21.81%	1,782	78.19%	0	0.00%
1948	333	16.19%	1,675	81.43%	49	2.38%
1952	774	28.17%	1,974	71.83%	0	0.00%
1956	1,033	34.66%	1,947	65.34%	0	0.00%
1960	1,027	29.84%	2,415	70.16%	0	0.00%
1964	1,144	31.35%	2,505	68.65%	0	0.00%
1968	1,016	21.26%	1,898	39.71%	1,866	39.04%
1972	2,559	61.65%	1,546	37.24%	46	1.11%
1976	1,486	34.07%	2,840	65.12%	35	0.80%
1980	1,943	38.57%	3,008	59.72%	86	1.71%
1984	2,731	46.67%	3,114	53.21%	7	0.12%
1988	2,186	43.69%	2,806	56.08%	12	0.24%
1992	1,780	33.89%	2,902	55.24%	571	10.87%
1996	1,562	34.47%	2,790	61.56%	180	3.97%
2000	2,169	44.36%	2,704	55.30%	17	0.35%
2004	2,484	45.40%	2,969	54.27%	18	0.33%
2008	2,670	41.37%	3,748	58.07%	36	0.56%
2012	2,622	40.34%	3,833	58.98%	44	0.68%
2016	2,564	41.59%	3,510	56.93%	91	1.48%
2020	2,781	44.82%	3,396	54.73%	28	0.45%
2024	2,768	46.57%	3,138	52.79%	38	0.64%

== Education ==
Washington County School District contains all public schools. The district contains a high school, a five-year early college, a middle school, and two elementary schools.

- Washington County High School
- Washington County Early College High School
- Washington County Middle School
- Creswell Elementary School
- Pines Elementary School

Pocosin Innovative Charter School is a charter school separate from the district.

== Communities ==
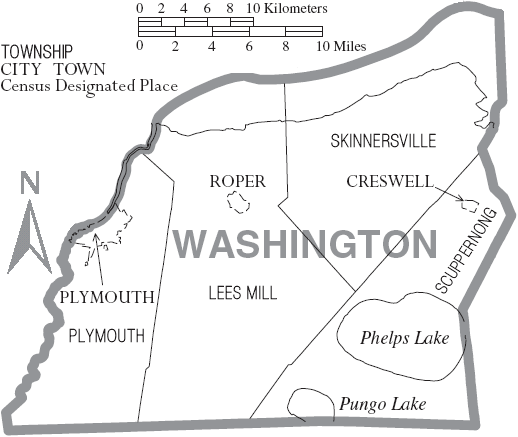
Map of Washington County with municipal and township labels

=== Towns ===
- Creswell
- Plymouth (county seat and largest community)
- Roper

=== Townships ===
- Plymouth
- Lees Mill
- Scuppernong
- Skinnersville

=== Unincorporated communities ===
- Lake Phelps
- Macedonia
- Mackeys
- Pea Ridge

== See also ==
- List of counties in North Carolina
- National Register of Historic Places listings in Washington County, North Carolina
