= Phelps (surname) =

Phelps is an English surname. The name is originated as a patronymic form of the name Philip. The name Philip is derived from the Greek name Philippos, which is composed of two elements: the first, philein, "to love"; the second, hippos, "horse". The Dictionary of American Family Names states that the surname Phelps is generally found in the south-western part of England.

== Notable people ==
- Abel Mix Phelps (1851–1902), American surgeon
- A. Warren Phelps (1829–1885), American politician
- Almira Hart Lincoln Phelps (1793–1884), American educator, author, editor
- Anson Green Phelps (1781–1853), co-founder of mining company Phelps Dodge
- Amos A. Phelps (1805–1847), abolitionist
- Amos A. Phelps (politician) (1867–?), member of the Massachusetts House of Representatives
- Aurora Phelps (1839–1876), American land reformer, trade union labor and women's rights advocate
- Austin Phelps (1820–1890), American clergyman and author of devotional and educational works, 19th century
- Babe Phelps (1908–1992), American baseball catcher
- Benjamin K. Phelps (1832–1880), New York County District Attorney
- Bill Phelps (1934–2019), Lieutenant Governor of Missouri
- Brandon Phelps (Illinois politician)
- Brandon Phelps (Missouri politician)
- Brian Phelps, radio personality
- Brian Phelps (diver), British former diver
- Cameron Phelps, Australian rugby league footballer
- Chance Phelps, US Marine killed in action in Iraq
- Charles Phelps (politician) (1852–1940), first Connecticut Attorney General
- Charles D. Phelps, American physician
- Charles E. Phelps, American Civil War-era soldier and politician
- Charles Phelps Taft, American lawyer and politician, brother of President Taft
- Charles Phelps Taft II, Mayor of Cincinnati, son of President Taft
- Christian Phelps (born 1993), Wisconsin politician
- Christopher Phelps, American historian
- David Phelps (disambiguation), several people, including
  - David Phelps (musician) (born 1969), American Christian music vocalist and songwriter
  - David Phelps (sport shooter) (born 1977), British sport shooter
  - David Phelps (baseball) (born 1986), American baseball pitcher
  - David D. Phelps (born 1947), U.S. Representative from Illinois
  - David Sutton Phelps Jr. (1930–2009), American anthropologist
- Dee Dee Phelps, American singer-songwriter and author
- Digger Phelps, American basketball coach
- Don Phelps, American football player
- Ed Phelps, American baseball catcher
- Edmund Phelps (1933–2026), American Nobel Prize-winning economist
- Edward H. Phelps, lieutenant colonel in the Union Army during the American Civil War
- Edward John Phelps, late 19th-century American lawyer, diplomat and politician
- Eleanor Phelps, American theatre, film and television actress
- Elisha Phelps, United States Representative from Connecticut
- Elizabeth Stuart Phelps Ward, American writer
- Fannie Phelps Adams (1917–2016), American educator, activist
- Forrest Phelps (1853–1918), American politician
- Francis Phelps (1863–1938), Anglican bishop
- Fred Phelps (1929–2014), American pastor and activist
- Geoff Phelps, Australian rules footballer
- George May Phelps (1820–1888), American inventor
- Georgiana Wilmerding Phelps (1873–1960), American socialite
- Gilbert Phelps (1915–1993), British educationist and author
- Harold Phelps (1903–1991), American long-distance runner
- Helen Watson Phelps (1864–1944), American painter
- Henry T. Phelps (1871–1944), American architect
- Herbert "Sarge" Phelps, American radio host
- Isaac Phelps (born 2009), British racing driver
- Isaac Newton Phelps Stokes, American architect
- Jake Phelps, Editor in Chief of Thrasher Magazine
- James and Oliver Phelps, identical twins and actors
- Jaycie Phelps, American gymnast and Olympic gold medalist
- Jeff Phelps, American sportscaster
- Jill Farren Phelps, television producer
- John Phelps (disambiguation), several people, including
  - John Phelps (regicide) (1619–?), tried Charles I of England for high treason in 1649
  - John M. Phelps (1821–1884), Republican President of the West Virginia Senate
  - John S. Phelps (1814–1886), Governor of Missouri 1876–1881
  - John W. Phelps (1813–1885), American Civil War general and presidential candidate
  - John E. Phelps (1839–1921), Union Army officer during the American Civil War
  - John Jay Phelps (1810–1869), American railroad baron and financier
- Joseph Lee Phelps, Canadian farmer and political figure
- Josh Phelps, Major League Baseball player
- Kelly Joe Phelps, singer/songwriter, blues slide guitarist
- Ken Phelps, Major League Baseball player
- Kerryn Phelps, Australian doctor
- Lancelot Phelps (priest) (1853–1936), British cleric and Provost of Oriel College
- Lonnie Phelps (born 2000), American football player
- Mark Phelps, American basketball coach
- Martha Austin Phelps (1870–1933), American chemist
- Matthew Phelps, Australian first-class cricketer
- Michael Phelps, American swimmer, multi-Olympic medalist
- Michael E. Phelps, inventor of Positron Emission Tomography
- Noah Phelps, American Revolutionary War-era soldier, spy, and politician
- Noah Phelps (Wisconsin politician), American surveyor and politician
- Oliver Phelps, American land speculator, settler, and judge
- Orange Phelps, American politician and movie theater owner in Hillsboro, Oregon
- Orson James Phelps (1820–1897), Canadian politician
- Patricia Phelps de Cisneros, philanthropist
- Peter Phelps, Australian actor
- Phelps Phelps, 38th Governor of American Samoa and US Ambassador to the Dominican Republic
- Phlash Phelps, American disc jockey
- Ray Phelps, American baseball pitcher
- Richard Phelps (artist), (1710–1785), English portrait artist
- Richard Phelps (bell-founder), (c. 1670–1738), English bell maker
- Richard Phelps (pentathlete), British athlete
- Robert Phelps (disambiguation), several people, including
  - Robert Phelps (1926–2013), American mathematician
  - Robert Phelps (academic) (1808–1890), British academic
  - Robert Phelps (pentathlete) (born 1939), British modern pentathlete
- Samuel Phelps, English actor
- Samuel S. Phelps, United States Senator
- Sarah Phelps, British television, radio, and film playwright
- Seth Ledyard Phelps, Union naval officer in the American Civil War
- Shirley Phelps-Roper, daughter of Fred Phelps (above)
- Thaddeus P. Mott (1831–1894), American soldier and adventurer
- Tammy Phelps, American politician
- Teresa Godwin Phelps (born 1944), American legal scholar and writer
- Terry Phelps (born 1966), American tennis player
- Thomas Phelps (1822–1901), United States Navy admiral
- Timothy Guy Phelps (1824–1899), American politician
- Tommy Phelps (born 1974), American baseball pitcher
- Travis Phelps (born 1977), American baseball player
- Tre Phelps (born 2004), American baseball player
- Vonda Phelps (1915–2004), American actress and dancer
- Walter Phelps (1832–1878), Union Army officer during the American Civil War
- Wesley Phelps (1923–1944), Medal of Honor recipient
- Willard Phelps (born 1941), Yukon politician
- William Phelps (disambiguation), several people, including
  - William Phelps (colonist) (1599–1672), one of the founders of Windsor, Connecticut
  - William Phelps (priest) (1797–1867), Church of England cleric
  - William E. Phelps (1835–?), American politician from Illinois
  - William F. Phelps (1822–1907), educational pioneer and author
  - William H. Phelps Sr. (1875–1965), American ornithologist and businessman.
  - William H. Phelps Jr. (1902–1988), Venezuelan ornithologist and businessman.
  - William J. Phelps (1808–1883), Illinois legislator
  - William Lyon Phelps (1865–1943), American author and critic
  - William Preston Phelps (1848–1917), American landscape painter
  - William Wallace Phelps (1826–1873), United States Representative from Minnesota
  - William Walter Phelps (1839–1894), United States Representative from New Jersey
- W. W. Phelps (Mormon) (1792–1872), early convert and leader in the Latter Day Saint movement
- M. William Phelps (born 1968), American crime writer and investigative journalist
- Zach Phelps (1857–1901), American baseball principal owner

== Fictional characters ==
- Cole Phelps, police detective in the 2011 video game L.A. Noire
- Jim Phelps, a fictional character from the Mission: Impossible TV series
- Mary Phelps, a fiction doctor from Casualty TV series
- Sally Phelps, Tom Sawyer's aunt in Adventures of Huckleberry Finn
- Travis Phelps, a fictional character from the video game Sally Face

== See also ==
- Phelps (disambiguation)
- Phleps
