= Phelps =

Phelps may refer to:

== Places in the United States ==
- Phelps, Kentucky
- Phelps, Michigan, an unincorporated community
- Phelps City, Missouri, an extinct hamlet
  - Phelps Station, a former rail station at Phelps City
- Phelps, New York
  - Phelps (village), New York
- Phelps, Wisconsin, a town
  - Phelps (community), Wisconsin, an unincorporated community
- Phelps County, Missouri
- Phelps County, Nebraska
- Phelps Lake (disambiguation)
- Lake Phelps

== Other uses ==
- Phelps (surname)
- Phelps Phelps, 38th Governor of American Samoa and United States Ambassador to the Dominican Republic
- USS Phelps (DD-360), a US Navy destroyer

== See also ==
- Philps, a surname
