= Richard Phelps =

Richard Phelps may refer to:

- Richard Phelps (artist) (1710–1785), English portrait artist
- Richard Phelps (bell-founder) (c. 1670–1738), English maker of bells
- Richard Phelps (pentathlete) (born 1961), British Olympic pentathlete
- Richard Phelps (rower) (born 1965), British Olympic rower
- Digger Phelps (Richard F. Phelps, born 1941), American basketball coach
- Richard J. Phelps, American politician

== See also ==
- Phelps (surname)
