= John Phelps =

John Phelps may refer to:

== Politics ==
- John Phelps (regicide) (1619–?), Clerk of the High Court of England and Wales which tried Charles I of England for high treason in 1649
- John M. Phelps (1821–1884), Republican President of the West Virginia Senate
- John S. Phelps (1814–1886), Governor of Missouri (1876–1881)
- John W. Phelps (1813–1885), American Civil War general and U.S. Presidential Candidate (1880)

== Others ==
- John E. Phelps (1839–1921), Union Army officer during the American Civil War
- John Jay Phelps (1810–1869), American railroad baron and financier
- John Phelps, writer for a number of British TV series including Birds of a Feather, My Hero and Young, Gifted and Broke

== See also ==
- Edward John Phelps (1822–1900), American lawyer and diplomat
