= Scuppernong River (North Carolina) =

Coordinates: 35°56′38″N 76°19′25″W

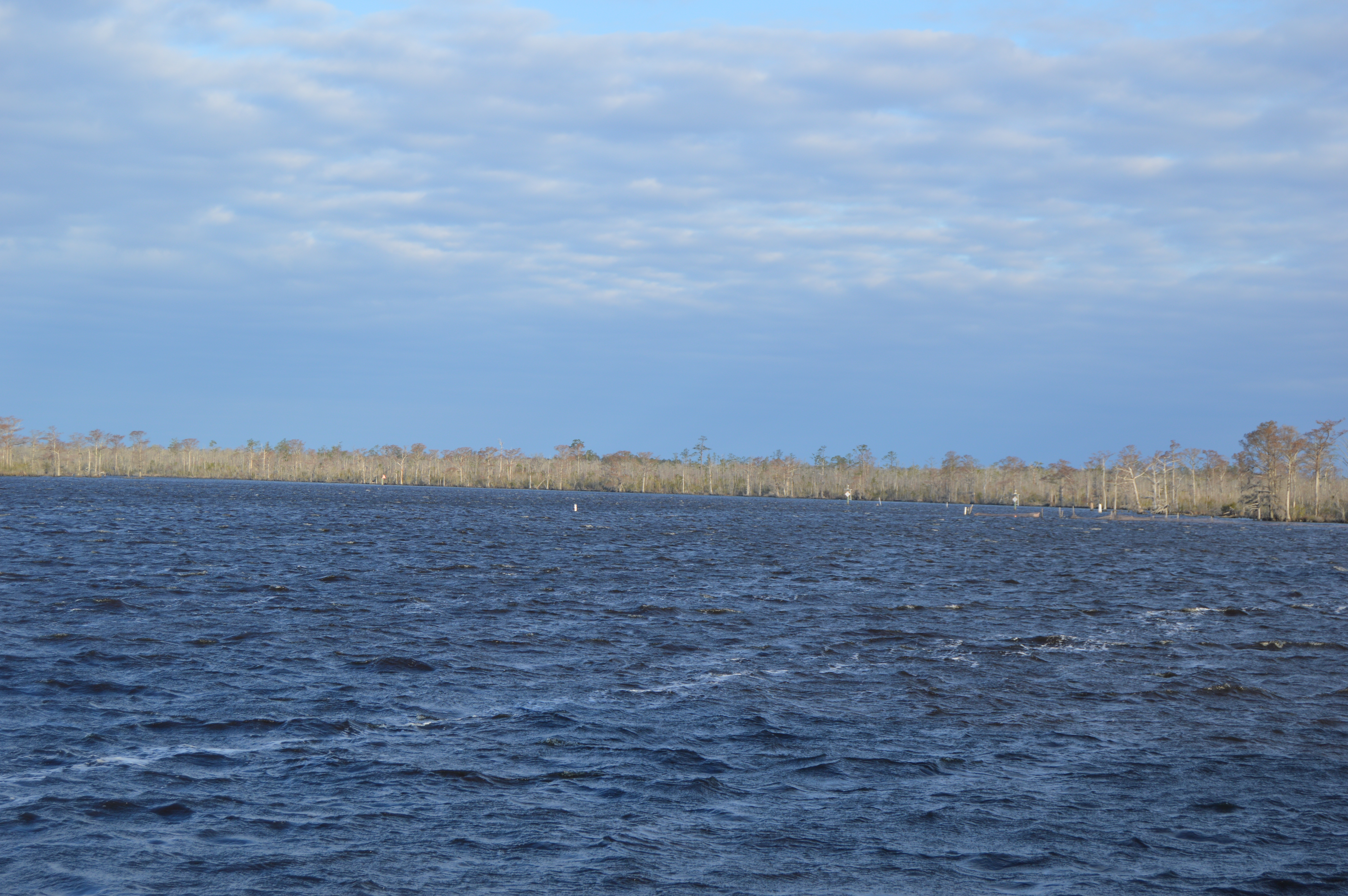
- In Pettigrew State Park north of Columbia

Location
- Country: United States
- State: North Carolina
- Counties: Tyrrell County and Washington County

Basin features
- River system: Albemarle Sound

The Scuppernong River is a blackwater river that flows through Tyrrell County and Washington County, North Carolina, into the Albemarle Sound. The river shares its name with the Scuppernong grapes native to the area. The river has a history closely linked to colonization and agricultural utilization. Currently, the Pocosin Lakes National Wildlife Refuge and Pettigrew State Park can be found on the banks of the river. The River is celebrated annually through the Scuppernong River Festival.

== History ==
=== Early inhabitants (9000 BC – 800 AD) ===
Native American activity around the Scuppernong River dates back to 9000 BC. Native American settlement within this area was mostly temporary until 300 to 1000 BC and continued to grow from 1000 BC to 800 AD. Native Americans found during that time were mostly likely linked to the Carolina Algonkian tribe.

=== European settlement (1584–1885) ===
The first European exploration within the Scuppernong River region was from 1584 to 1587. At the time of European exploration in North Carolina, the Mequopen Native American village, part of the Carolina Algonkian settlements, was present on the south bank of the Scuppernong River.

European settlements along the river were smaller residences often separated, until Thomas Pollock established the first plantation along the lower portion of the river in the summer of 1697. Soon after European settlement boomed and eventually led to the establishment of Tyrrell County that encompassed Washington and Dare Counties and a smaller portion of Martin County in 1729.

The establishment of the Lake Company, founded by Josiah Collins Sr., Nathaniel Allen, and Dr. Samuel Dickenson helped support the region’s development. The company’s acquisition of 100,000 acres between Lake Phelps and the Scuppernong River led to the creation of the Somerset Canal between the two bodies of water completed in 1788. The canal, constructed by slave labor, served multiple purposes including drainage, irrigation, and powering mills. This site is also the location of Somerset place which was built in 1787 and designated as a North Carolina historic site in 1969. The area became a hub for exports, particularly rice, wheat, corn, lumber, shingles, and slaves. Over time, the establishment of settlements like Elizabeth Town and Columbia further expanded trade networks along the Scuppernong River.

As trade increased within the areas surrounding the Scuppernong River, legislators passed a resolution to help improve navigation of the river. The project continuing from 1879 to 1885 included the dredging of a channel through the river’s mouth and a turning basin at eight sharp bends, and the removal of sand banks along the river that would obstruct maritime travel up and down the river.

=== Preservation (1937–present) ===
After the Civil War, the Collins and Pettigrew plantations situated next to the Scuppernong River saw decreasing use, except for tenant farmers. This led to the acquisition of a large section of the plantation by the Farm Security Administration to become the Scuppernong Farms in 1937. This land eventually was leased and then deeded to North Carolina for the creation of Pettigrew State Park in 1947. The procurement of this land to the state led to many preservation events as in 1963 the 12,000 acre Pungo National Wildlife Refuge was established and in 1967 Somerset Place was established as a Historical Landmark. In 1990 the Pocosin Lakes National Wildlife Refuge was established and the Scuppernong River section of Pettigrew State Park in 2004 with the aid of The Nature Conservancy.

Each October, Tyrrell County hosts an annual Scuppernong River Festival, a local tradition since 1991. The festival brings in thousands of people to celebrate the river through car shows, food trucks, and live music.

== Ecology ==
The Scuppernong River region has diverse plants and wildlife that are characteristic of North Carolina wetlands.

=== Plant life ===
The forested areas near the river are riverine swamp forests. Common tree species in these forests are bald cypress, black gum, water tupelo, Atlantic white cedar, ti-ti, wax myrtle, and red maple. Pitcher plants, lizard's tail and royal fern can be found in the understory.

=== Animal life ===
The Scuppernong region is home to one of the largest populations of black bears in the southeast United States. Red wolves, a rare and endangered species of wolf native to southeast North America, also live in the area. Other terrestrial animals that may be seen near the Scuppernong River include white-tailed deer and bobcats. Alligators and North American river otters can be found in the water. Many notable bird species live around the river, including American woodcocks, red-cockaded woodpeckers, wood ducks, and bald eagles. Migratory bird species spend their winters in the surrounding wetlands.

There are crab populations capable of sustaining a major crabbing industry. The upper Scuppernong River is a spawning ground for inland fish species and a large variety of fish live in the river.

== Hydrology ==
The Scuppernong River was a tributary to the Roanoke River during the last glacial maximum. The river flows into Bull Bay. Lake Phelps and Lake Pungo are located southeast of the Scuppernong River. Both lakes are Carolina Bays.

Managing water systems in the region is growing increasingly difficult due to climate change, higher demand for water, and land-use modifications. Wetlands around the river have been ditched and drained. Ditching has degraded the soil, resulting in low habitat value and elevated wildfire risk.

== Recreation ==
There are paddle trails on the river, but they are currently lacking in information and signage. There is a boat ramp that provides access to the Scuppernong River. The ramp is managed by the North Carolina Wildlife Commission.

The Pocosin Lakes National Wildlife Refuge abuts the river. The primary purpose of the refuge is habitat conservation, but there are recreation opportunities like the Scuppernong River Interpretive Boardwalk. The boardwalk is wheelchair accessible and meanders through a cypress swamp.
