= William Phelps =

William Phelps may refer to:

- Bill Phelps (1934–2019), Lieutenant Governor of Missouri
- William Phelps (colonist) (1599–1672), one of the founders of Windsor, Connecticut
- William Phelps (priest) (1797–1867), Church of England cleric
- William E. Phelps (1835–?), American politician from Illinois
- William F. Phelps (1822–1907), educational pioneer and author
- William H. Phelps Sr. (1875–1965), American ornithologist and businessman.
- William H. Phelps Jr. (1902–1988), Venezuelan ornithologist and businessman.
- William J. Phelps (1808–1883), Illinois legislator
- William Lyon Phelps (1865–1943), American author and critic
- William Preston Phelps (1848–1917), American landscape painter
- William Wallace Phelps (1826–1873), United States Representative from Minnesota
- William Walter Phelps (1839–1894), United States Representative from New Jersey
- W. W. Phelps (Mormon) (1792–1872), early convert and leader in the Latter Day Saint movement
- M. William Phelps (born 1968), American crime writer and investigative journalist
