= Lake Phelps Site =

The Lake Phelps Site is an archaeological site containing much evidence of prehistoric occupation in Washington County, North Carolina. Eleven archaeological investigations have been conducted at the lake over a course of 25 years. Altogether the investigations "recovered over 5,000 artifacts and located and documented 23 canoes." Archaeologists were able to analyze and categorize the recovered artifacts into 10 different artifact types. In addition, the archaeologists were able to provide radiocarbon dates to most of the canoes. The result of all of this provided evidence of prehistoric occupation of Lake Phelps that dated from the Late PaleoIndian/Early Archaic period through the Late Woodland period.

== Description ==
Lake Phelps is the second largest natural lake in North Carolina. According to the North Carolina Division of Parks and Recreation, the lake has a surface area of 16,600 acres. It also sits at "one of the highest lake elevations in the area." Lake Phelps is not very deep; for instance, the average depth for the lake is 4.5 feet, while the maximum depth of the lake is 9 feet. The lake is remarkably clean. The reason it is so clean is that the water in the lake only comes from rainfall. With that in mind, a drought can cause decreased water levels at the lake, which can lead to exposed shorelines and interesting discoveries.

== History of investigations ==
=== The Initial Canoe Investigations (1985-1986) ===
Members of the North Carolina Office of State Archaeology (OSA), the Underwater Archaeology Unit (UAU), and the Pettigrew State Park discovered four dugout canoes and prehistoric ceramics at the lake. After analyses, the UAU indicated that the ceramics fell into the category of two ceramic types: Mount Pleasant and Colington. The artifacts also dated back to a time period between 300 BC and AD 1650. In addition, the archaeologists radiocarbon dated some of the canoes and found out they were from 770 BC and 900 BC.

=== The Claggett Survey (1986) ===
A member from the OSA named Steve Claggett conducted a two-day field survey that resulted in the discovery of another canoe and 340 ceramic artifacts that originated from Early and Late Woodland periods. The survey consisted of a "50-x-50 m grid system running 400 m along the shore and 200 m south into the lake."

=== The UAU/Morris Survey (1986) ===
Kaea Morris from East Carolina University (ECU) conducted a survey and excavation with the help of UAU members to try and find additional canoes. The survey area was 190 meters. Morris divided the survey area into "500-x-500-ft sections to be walked in 5-ft to 10-ft transects parallel to the shore." Throughout the course of the next year, Morris went on to collaborate with David Phelps. Together, they discovered 19 new canoes, which dated back to 2430 BC to AD 1400. Some artifacts were also recovered.

=== The Phelps Survey (1987) ===
David Phelps established a shoreline survey on the eastern part of Lake Phelps and a reconnaissance survey on the western shore. The survey area was "almost 5,000 meters" and consisted of "47 transects measuring 100 m wide by 50 m long." Phelps and helpers collected 1,777 artifacts from the eastern half of Lake Phelps. 1,127 of the collected artifacts were from the Late Paleoindian to the Late Woodland periods. On another note, 366 artifacts were returned to Lake Phelps' western shore. 349 of these artifacts dated from the Early Woodland through the Late Woodland periods.

=== The National Geographic Society Survey (1992) ===
The National Geographic Society (NGS) helped finance a project that involved the use of the ground penetrating radar (GPR) to try and find new and previously recorded canoes. The results were mixed. The GPR was able to clearly locate previously recorded canoes; however, the GPR also gave false readings for new canoes, which was caused by the complex arrangement of lake bed sediments.

=== The Lawrence and Mathis Survey (2002) ===
Richard Lawrence from the UAU and Mark Mathis from the OSA went to Lake Phelps to examine the prehistoric ceramic artifacts reported on the eastern shore. They found six ceramic clusters. Lawrence and Mathis had the artifacts curated at an OSA facility. The results were that no diagnostic artifacts were from this collection. Lawrence and Mathis also tried to re-locate previously recorded canoes; however, the canoes could not be found. They believed that the canoes were buried beneath sediment.

=== The Curci Survey (2004) ===
Jessica Curci from ECU collaborated with the UAU to move existing canoes to another location. Notably, Curci and the UAU wanted to perform a morphological analysis on the existing canoes. The UAU also wanted to check if burial was an adequate form of preservation. Many existing canoes were not found. However, the canoes that were found displayed good physical condition.

=== The UAU Revisit of 31WH12 (2008) ===
UAU members visited the lake to learn about how low water levels impact the canoes. The members examined five canoes. Two of the canoes were potentially deteriorated due to exposure to the air. The other canoes were in good condition. On a different note, the UAU members decided to conduct a re-examination of a portion of the survey area in the Claggett survey. "Twenty-one ceramic sherds, two lithic artifacts, and a portion of a steatite bowl were recovered." Archaeologists claimed that the artifacts are from the Early Woodland and Middle Woodland periods.

=== Site 31WH12 Re-Inspection (2008) ===
Low water levels continued. As a result, prehistoric artifacts started emerging on the lake bed. Members from multiple organizations associated with the park and previous investigations visited the lake to investigate these artifacts. 593 artifacts were found. 254 of those artifacts were temporally diagnostic.

=== The Pierce Survey (2009) ===
Greg Pierce conducted a research project dedicated to the synthesis of data regarding the prehistoric use of Lake Phelps. The project revealed that a section of the eastern shore has not been surveyed. Consequently, a shoreline survey was conducted. 247 artifacts were recovered. 219 of those artifacts were temporally diagnostic, and the artifacts date back to the Early Woodland, Middle Woodland, and Late Woodland.

== Research on prehistoric use of Lake Phelps ==
=== Late Paleoindian/Early Archaic Period (8500 to 6000 B.C.) ===
Only three artifacts were associated with this prehistoric period. One Hardaway point and two Kirk points. The limited amount of artifacts from this period may indicate a lack of human settlement.

=== The Late Archaic Period (3000 to 1000 B.C.) ===
Only two artifacts and three canoes were associated with this prehistoric period. The two artifacts found were Savannah River points. There is not enough evidence to make an accurate inference on prehistoric use of the lake at this time.

=== Early Woodland Period (1000 to 300 B.C.) ===
1,754 artifacts and 2 canoes were related to the Early Woodland period. Artifact types include Croaker Landing ceramics, Deep Creek ceramics, and Marcy Creek ceramics. These artifacts were recovered from multiple parts of the lake; thus, an implication of increased use of the lake during the Early Woodland period. The data points to possibly "sedentary residence." Archaeologists also believed that the lake area experienced population growth during this time period. With that in mind, extraction of local resources started to increase.

=== Middle Woodland Period (300 B.C. to A.D. 800) ===
Archaeologists have categorized 1,085 artifacts and 11 dugout canoes to the Middle Woodland period. The artifacts recovered either belong to Mockley ceramics or Mount Pleasant ceramics. The findings infer two different meanings regarding lake use. Decrease in artifact findings suggest decreased lake use; however, the significant increase in canoe findings suggest increased lake use. There are several possible explanations for the contradictory data. The possibilities include artifact type misidentification, survey sampling issue, or changing settlement practices.

=== Late Woodland Period (A.D. 800 to 1650) ===
225 artifacts and three canoes belong to the Late Woodland Period. The artifacts are categorized into two types of artifacts: Cashie ceramics and Colington ceramics. It is important to mention that most of the artifacts were identified as Colington ceramics. The lack of diversity in the types of artifacts may explain the decrease in artifacts and canoes. On that note, Phelps infers that "the ceramic distributions mark the social boundaries of distinct groups." The Colington series belong to the Algonquin speakers. Phelps assumes that the Algonquin speakers were the primary occupants at Lake Phelps because the majority of the recovered artifacts belong to them. The Cashie series belonged to the Tuscarora. There was not a lot of Cashie ceramics, which may have indicated the limited presence of the Tuscarora or "the existence of trade relations". Another reason for low artifact count may have been the shift in subsistence strategies. Groups may have left Lake Phelps in search for land that was more suitable for agriculture.

== Significance ==
The Lake Phelps site is important for a couple of reasons. One reason is that the archaeological site can help us learn more about indigenous peoples. In analyzing recovered artifacts, archaeologists are able to make better predictions about how indigenous peoples lived and so forth. Another reason is that Lake Phelps contains evidence of prehistoric use. With that in mind, the site can help us study the past before historical records began.
