= Robert Philp (disambiguation) =

Robert Philp (1851–1922) was an Australian politician.

Robert Philp may also refer to:

- Robert Kemp Philp (1819–1882), English journalist, author, and Chartist
- Robert Philp (missionary) (1913–2008), Scottish missionary
- Sir Robert William Philip (1857–1939), pioneer of tuberculosis
