= Philp =

Philp is a surname, and may refer to:

- Chris Philp (born 1976), British entrepreneur and Conservative Party politician
- Douglas Philp (born 1967), Scottish chemist
- Geoffrey Philp (born 1958), Jamaican poet, novelist and playwright
- Hugh Philp (1786–1856), Scottish golf club maker
- James George Philp (1816–1885), English landscape and coastal painter
- Noah Philp (born 1998), Canadian professional ice hockey player
- Peter Philp (1920–2006), Welsh dramatist and antiques expert
- Robert Kemp Philp (1819–1882), English chartist
- Robert Philp (1851–1922), Scottish-Australian businessman and Premier of Queensland
- Robert Philp (missionary) (1913–2008), Church of Scotland missionary in Kenya
- Tom Philp (1923–1994), Scottish radiologist
- Willie Philp, Scottish footballer

== See also ==
- Philip (name)
