= Philps =

Philps is a surname. Notable people with the surname include:

- Andrew Philps (1857–1929), Canadian politician
- Walter Philps (1903–?), English cricketer

== See also ==
- Philp
- Phipps (surname)
