= Phleps =

Phleps is a surname. Notable people with the name include:

- Artur Phleps (1881–1944), Waffen-SS officer
- Thomas Phleps (1955–2017), German guitarist and musicologist

== See also ==
- Phelps (surname)
