= David Phelps =

David Phelps may refer to:

- David Phelps (musician) (born 1969), American Christian music vocalist and songwriter
- David Phelps (sport shooter) (born 1977), British sport shooter
- David Phelps (baseball) (born 1986), American baseball pitcher
- David Phelps (politician) (born 1947), U.S. representative from Illinois
- David Sutton Phelps Jr. (1930–2009), American anthropologist
