= The Pioneers (sculpture) =

- U.S. National Register of Historic Places
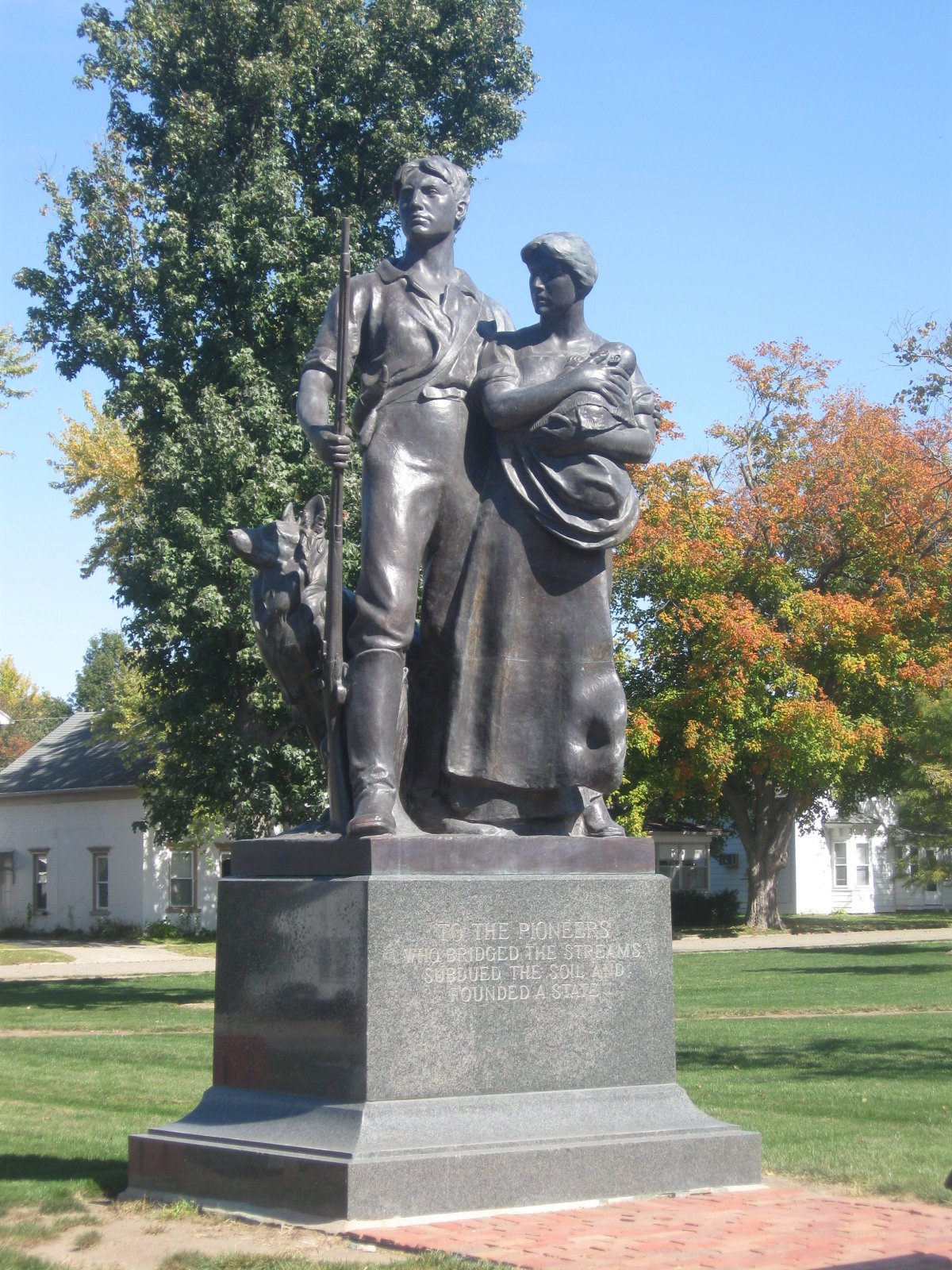

- Location within Peoria County, Illinois
- Location: Central Park, N,. Magnolia St., Elmwood, Illinois
- Coordinates: 40°46′42.12″N 89°57′56.75″W
- Built: 1928
- Architect: Lorado Taft
- NRHP reference No.: 01000117
- Added to NRHP: May 4, 2001

The Pioneers , also known as Pioneers , is a bronze sculpture in Central Park in Elmwood, Illinois. The sculpture is one of several works by Lorado Taft in Elmwood, his birthplace. Taft was a prominent Chicago-based sculptor with a national reputation for his monuments and fountains, including works designed for the 1893 Columbian Exposition. He donated The Pioneers to Elmwood under the condition that the city pay for its casting and mounting.

The sculpture, which is 10 feet (3.0 m) tall and weighs 3,500 pounds (1,600 kg), depicts a pioneer family. The family is looking westward, symbolizing the pioneers' westward expansion, and the figures reflect the Midwestern realism of Taft's earlier works rather than the Renaissance-inspired idealism of his later sculptures. The sculpture was dedicated on May 27, 1928, and a public ceremony was held for the occasion. The inscription below the statue reads:

TO THE PIONEERS
WHO BRIDGED THE STREAMS
SUBDUED THE SOIL AND
FOUNDED A STATE

The sculpture was listed on the National Register of Historic Places on May 4, 2001.
