= James D. Putnam =

American politician

- Born: March 13, 1859; Saint Paul, Minnesota
- Died: February 13, 1917 (aged 57); Peoria, Illinois
- Occupations: lawyer; politician

James D. Putnam (March 13, 1859 – February 13, 1917) was an American lawyer and politician.

Putnam was born in Saint Paul, Minnesota. He moved with his parents to Illinois. He lived in Elmwood, Illinois and graduated from Elmwood High School. Putnam graduated from the University of Illinois Law School in 1894 and admitted to the Illinois bar in 1895. Putnam practiced law. He was also involved in the real estate and hotel businesses, raising cattle, and cigar manufacturing. Putnam also served as the police magistrate in Elmwood, Illinois. Putnam served in the Illinois Senate from 1897 to 1907 and was a Republican. In 1916, Putnam was elected to the Illinois House of Representatives serving in 1917 until his death. Putnam became ill at his home in Elmwood and taken to the Deaconess Hospital, in Peoria, Illinois, where he died.
