= 2nd Arkansas Cavalry Regiment (Union) =

2nd Regiment Arkansas Volunteer Cavalry
- Active: July 1862–August 20, 1865
- Disbanded: August 20, 1865
- Country: United States
- Allegiance: Union
- Branch: Cavalry
- Size: Regiment
- Engagements: American Civil War

Commanders
- Notable commanders: Col. John E. Phelps

The 2nd Regiment Arkansas Volunteer Cavalry (1862–1865) was a cavalry regiment that served in the Union Army during the American Civil War. Although Arkansas joined the Confederate States of America in 1861, not all of its citizens supported secession. Arkansas formed some 48 infantry regiments to serve in the Confederate Army, but also formed another 11 regiments that served in the Union Army.

== Organization ==
The 2nd Arkansas Cavalry was organized at Helena, Arkansas and Pilot Knob, Missouri and mustered into Federal service in July 1862.

== Service ==
Duty at Helena, Ark., till April, 1863. At Fayetteville, Ark., till July 1863, and at Cassville, Mo., till September, 1864. (Co. "B" at Benton Barracks, Mo., June, 1863. At Cape Girardeau, Mo., July, 1863. Scout from Cape Girardeau to the Ash Hills and Poplar Bluff, Mo., August 9–18. Skirmish, Ash Hills, August 13. Expedition from Cape Girardeau to Pocahantas, Ark., August 18–26. Skirmishes, Pocahontas, August 22–23.) Elm Springs July 30. Near Fayette August 23 (Detachment). Jenny Lind September 1. Crawford County November 25. Barronsville, Searcy County, December 26. Waldron December 29. King's River January 10, 1864. Operations against Guerrillas in Northwest Arkansas, in Newton, Searcy, Izzard and Carroll Counties, January 16-February 15. Lewisburg January 17. Clear Creek and Tomahawk January 22. Bailey's or Crooked Creek January 23 (Co. "C"). Crooked Creek February 5. Tomahaw Gap February 9. Expedition from Rolling Prairie to Batesville February 19-April 4. Scouts from Yellville to Buffalo River March 13–26. Oil Trough Bottom March 24 (Detachment). Near White River March 25. Constant scouting and skirmishing with Guerillas. Scouts from Bellefonte March 29-April 1. Whiteley's Mills April 5. Piney Mountain April 6. Osage Branch King's River April 16 (Co. "A"). Limestone Valley April 17. King's River April 19. Near mouth of Richland Creek May 3 and 5. Scout in Northern Arkansas May 17–22 (Co. "M"). Scout from Cassville to Cross Hollows June 9–14 and June 20–24. Near Maysville July 20. Operations in Southwest Missouri and Northwest Arkansas August 15–24. Scout from Ozark, Mo., to Dubuque Crossing and Sugar Loaf Prairie August 23–26 (Detachment). Expedition from Cassville, Mo., to Fayetteville, Ark., August 23–28 (Detachment). Gerald Mountain and Mud Town August 24. Operations against Price August 29-December 2. Moreau Creek, Jefferson City, October 7. Russellville October 9. California October 9. Near Booneville October 11–12. Fort Smith, Ark., October 14 (Detachment). Dover October 20. Little Blue October 21. Independence, Big Blue and State Line October 22. Big Blue and Westport October 23. Little Osage, Mine Creek, Marais des Cygnes, October 25. Engagement on the Marmiton, or Battle of Charlot, October 25. Newtonia October 28. Upshaw's Farm October 29. Expedition from Springfield, Mo., to Fort Smith, Ark., November 5–16. Near Cincinnati, Ark., November 6. Scout from Springfield to Huntsville and Yellville November 11–21. Ordered to Memphis, Tenn., January, 1865. Duty there and in District of West Tennessee till August.

== Mustered out of service ==
The regiment was mustered out August 20, 1865.

== See also ==
- List of Arkansas Civil War Union units
- List of United States Colored Troops Civil War Units
- Arkansas in the American Civil War
