= Phelps Lake =

Phelps Lake may refer to:

- Canada
  - Phelps Lake, a lake in Saskatchewan
- United States
  - Phelps Lake (Wyoming), located in Grand Teton National Park, Wyoming
  - Phelps Lake, a lake in Rice County, Minnesota
  - Lake Phelps, a lake in Washington County, North Carolina
  - Phelps Lake, a reservoir in Rockwall County, Texas
