= Pettigrew State Park =

State park in North Carolina, United States

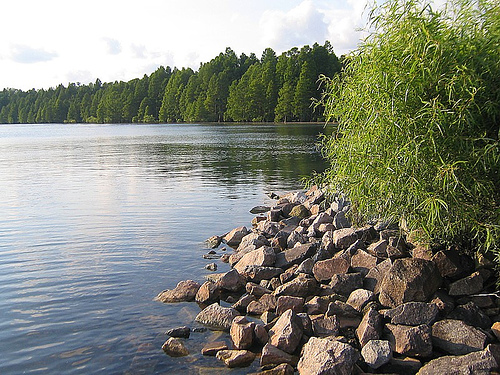
- Lake Phelps

- Location within North Carolina Location within the United States
- Interactive map of Pettigrew State Park
- Location: Tyrrell and Washington counties, North Carolina, United States
- Coordinates: 35°48′15″N 76°26′57″W
- Area: 5,951 acres (2,408 ha)
- Elevation: 10 ft (3.0 m)
- Established: 1936
- Administrator: North Carolina Division of Parks and Recreation
- Named for: J. Johnston Pettigrew
- Website: Official website

Pettigrew State Park is a North Carolina State Park in Tyrrell and Washington counties, North Carolina, in the United States. It covers 5,951 acres (24.08 km^{2}) around the shore lines of Lake Phelps and the Scuppernong River. The park's developed facilities are south of U.S. Route 64 near Roper and Creswell, North Carolina. Pettigrew State Park is open for year-round recreation, including hiking, camping, fishing, boating and picnicking.

Pettigrew State Park is named for Confederate General J. Johnston Pettigrew, who lived in a nearby home. It surrounds Somerset Place, a North Carolina state historic site that includes a restored 1830s plantation house and outbuildings that can be toured, including reconstructed slave quarters.

Pettigrew State Park was established during the Great Depression after the land was leased from the Farm Security Administration, a New Deal program of U.S. President Franklin D. Roosevelt.

Part of Pettigrew State Park surrounds Lake Phelps, one of the oldest lakes in the eastern United States and a former hunting and fishing ground for the Algonquian peoples. Archaeologists have found dugout canoes in the lake that are up to 4,400 years old, preserved by its unusually clean waters. Pettigrew is home to an abundance of wildlife: Lake Phelps is a primary wintering location for several types of waterfowl, including Canada geese and Tundra swans. The park is also home to the woodland creatures, such as raccoons and white-tailed deer, that are commonly found along the east coast of the United States. Lake Phelps contains several species of game fish including largemouth bass and catfish.

The park also manages the 16,600-acre (67 km^{2}) Lake Phelps, which is a North Carolina State Lake. All together, the park manages 22,430 acres (90.8 km^{2}).

== Geology ==
Pettigrew State Park surrounds Lake Phelps, North Carolina's second largest natural made lake. The lake, on a peninsula between Albemarle Sound and the Pamlico River, is one of a series of Carolina bay lakes that stretch from New Jersey to Florida along the Atlantic Coastal Plain. Recent work by the U.S. Geological Survey has interpreted the Carolina Bays as relict thermokarst lakes that formed several thousands of years ago when the climate was colder, drier, and windier. Thermokarst lakes develop by thawing of frozen ground (permafrost) and by subsequent modification by wind and water. Thus, this interpretation suggests that permafrost once extended as far south as the Carolina Bays during the last ice age and (or) previous ice ages. Lake Phelps is not fed by any stream, but relies entirely upon rain and springs to maintain its water level. Since the lake is not fed by a stream that could carry pollutants from nearby farms and factories, the water is very clean. Lake Phelps is five miles (8 km) across, with an average depth of just 4.5 feet (1.5 m). The lake is thought to be more than 38,000 years old.

== Human history ==
=== Early inhabitants ===
Lake Phelps is named for Josiah Phelps, the first white man to enter its waters. Phelps and another colonial explorer, Benjamin, were searching through what was then known as the Great Eastern Dismal or Great Alligator Dismal in 1755. Phelps and Tarkington were part of a group of hunters who entered the swamps in search of game and farmland. The group had become discouraged and were about to leave when Tarkington scaled one of the trees and spotted the lake a short distance away. Phelps went ahead and ran into the water. As the first in the water he was given the honor of naming the lake.

The history of human habitation in and around Pettigrew State Park stretches back as far as 8000 BC. Archaeologists have found thousands of relics at the park, including pottery, arrowheads, and sunken dugout canoes. Estimates place some of the dugouts as being at least 4,400 years old. They were preserved in the bottom of the lake by its unusually clean waters.

The dugouts were created by Algonquian peoples who were seasonal visitors to the area. They built them from the logs of cypress by slowly burning out the center of the log and scraping the burnt wood out, leaving only the outer shell. Historians believe that the Algonquian would sink their canoes to the bottom of the lake for safekeeping until they would return the following fishing and hunting season. Thirty of these ancient canoes have been found in Lake Phelps, with perhaps more yet to be discovered.

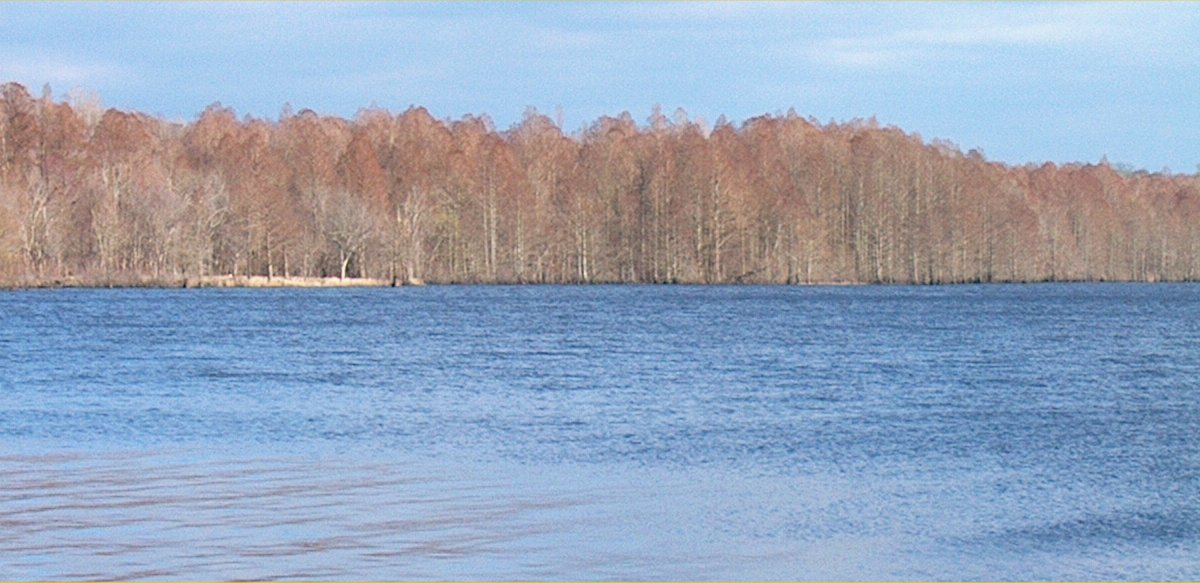
Lake Phelps is a natural lake that is in Pettigrew State Park.

=== Plantation era ===
Josiah Collins was one of the first European-descended settlers to live and farm in the area of Pettigrew State Park, arriving in the 1780s. Collins and his partners used slave labor to drain the swamps surrounding Lake Phelps and establish an extensive plantation known as Somerset Place.

Collins and his partners brought in slaves from Africa to dig a canal from Lake Phelps to the Scuppernong River. The canal served two purposes: first, as a means of transporting goods and people to and from the plantation; and second, it served as a massive drainage ditch as the slaves of Somerset Place worked to drain the surrounding swamps. Later, the canal system was expanded to provide irrigation for the rice and corn fields of the plantation.

Pettigrew State Park is named for J. Johnston Pettigrew, a Confederate General who lies buried in the family cemetery in the park. Pettigrew was one of the commanding officers at the Battle of Gettysburg during the Civil War, and led a division during Pickett's Charge. He sustained mortal wounds during General Robert E. Lee's retreat from Gettysburg. The general, who grew up on a farm that adjoined Somerset Place, is buried with his father and grandfather. Their final resting place is a popular stopping point for visitors to the park.

Somerset Place was a prosperous plantation until the end of the Civil War, when plantation life was forever altered by the abolition of slavery. The Collins family was unable to maintain the plantation without slave labor following the war and sold it off.

=== State park era ===
Somerset Place and the land that is now Pettigrew State Park passed through the hands of several owners until it was acquired by the Farm Security Administration in 1937 during the Great Depression. The state of North Carolina administers the land under the terms of a 99-year lease signed in 1939 with the United States Department of Agriculture. Pettigrew State Park has been expanded at various times since it opened in 1939. Two of the most recent land acquisitions included adding the entire shoreline of Lake Phelps, and the largest expansion, which took place along the Scuppernong River in 2004.

The Scuppernong had remained largely undeveloped throughout history. In 1793, the town of Columbia was built on its banks, as were several boat landings. The Scuppernong is a blackwater river: its water is colored like black tea or coffee. The Scuppernong served as a means of transportation for the early settlers in this region of North Carolina. Since 1989 the Nature Conservancy has sought to protect it in its most natural state. In 2002 the Nature Conservancy offered to donate four tracts of land that they owned along the Scuppernong if the state would purchase three more tracts that became available that same year. The state agreed and in 2004 the area along the river was officially added to the state park system.

== Ecology ==
=== Plant life ===
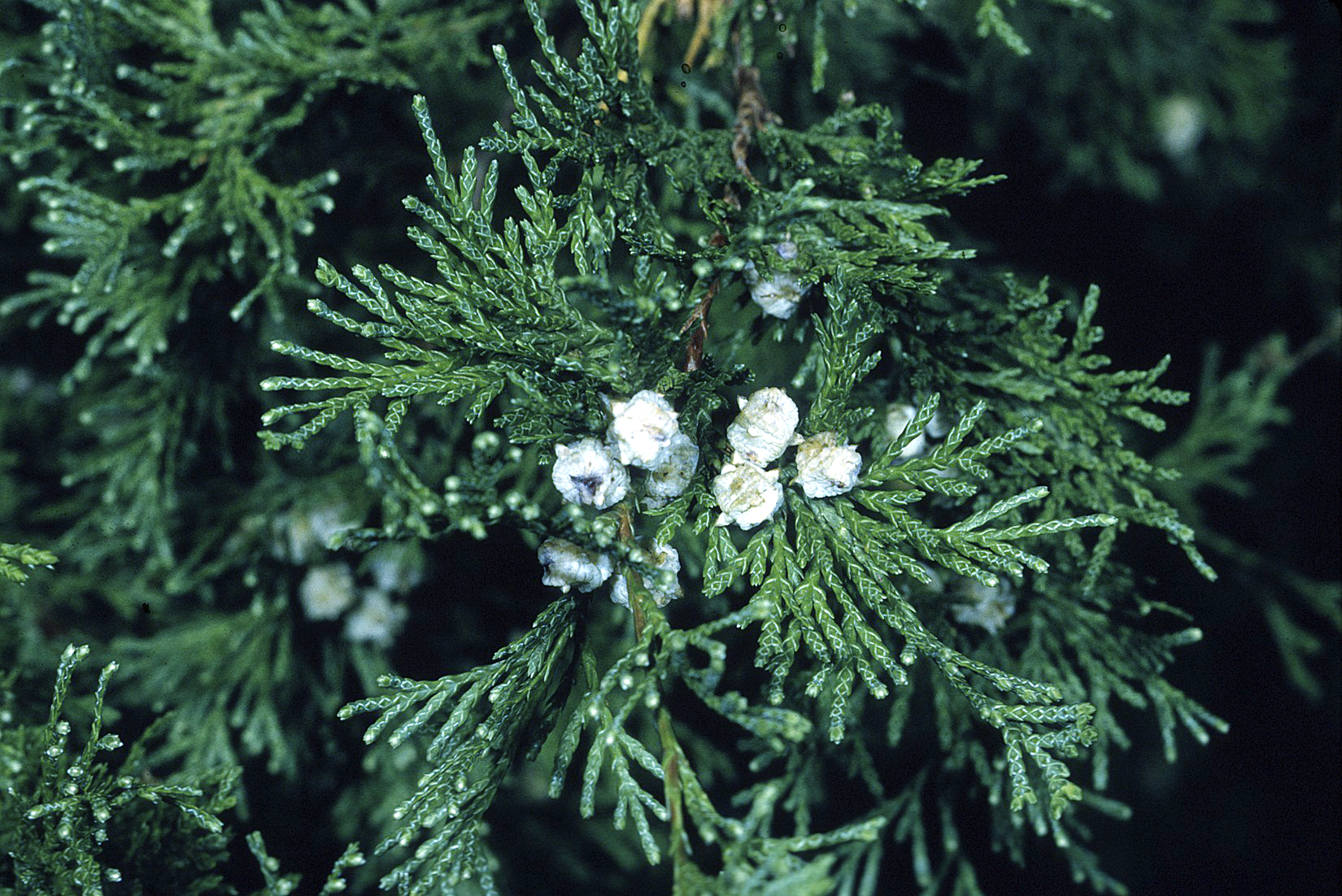
The Atlantic white cedar is an evergreen found at Pettigrew State Park.

Pettigrew State Park is home to one of the last stands of old-growth forest in eastern North Carolina. A forest of bay trees, sweetgum, pawpaw, persimmon, bald cypress and poplar are found on the northern shore of Lake Phelps. The cypress have a trunk diameter of up to ten feet (3 m) and the poplar have a trunk diameter of six feet (2 m). There are vines that are as wide as an average man's leg and grow up the trees in excess of 130 feet (40 m). In the section of the park along the Scuppernong River, the Atlantic white cedar and other rare cedar trees have grown to rather large sizes. Several of the trees at Pettigrew State Park are listed on the North Carolina and National Registries of Big Trees.

Wildflowers are found throughout Pettigrew State Park. Atamasco lily, periwinkle, buttercup, Jack-in-the-pulpit, maypops, and jewelweed are sometimes found on the banks and in the shallows of Lake Phelps. The Scuppernong River provides a habitat for swamp dogwood, evening primrose, blue flag iris and cardinal flowers. The roughleaf dogwood is also found near the river. This particular dogwood is rare in North Carolina and the type along the Scuppernong is rarer still.

=== Animal life ===
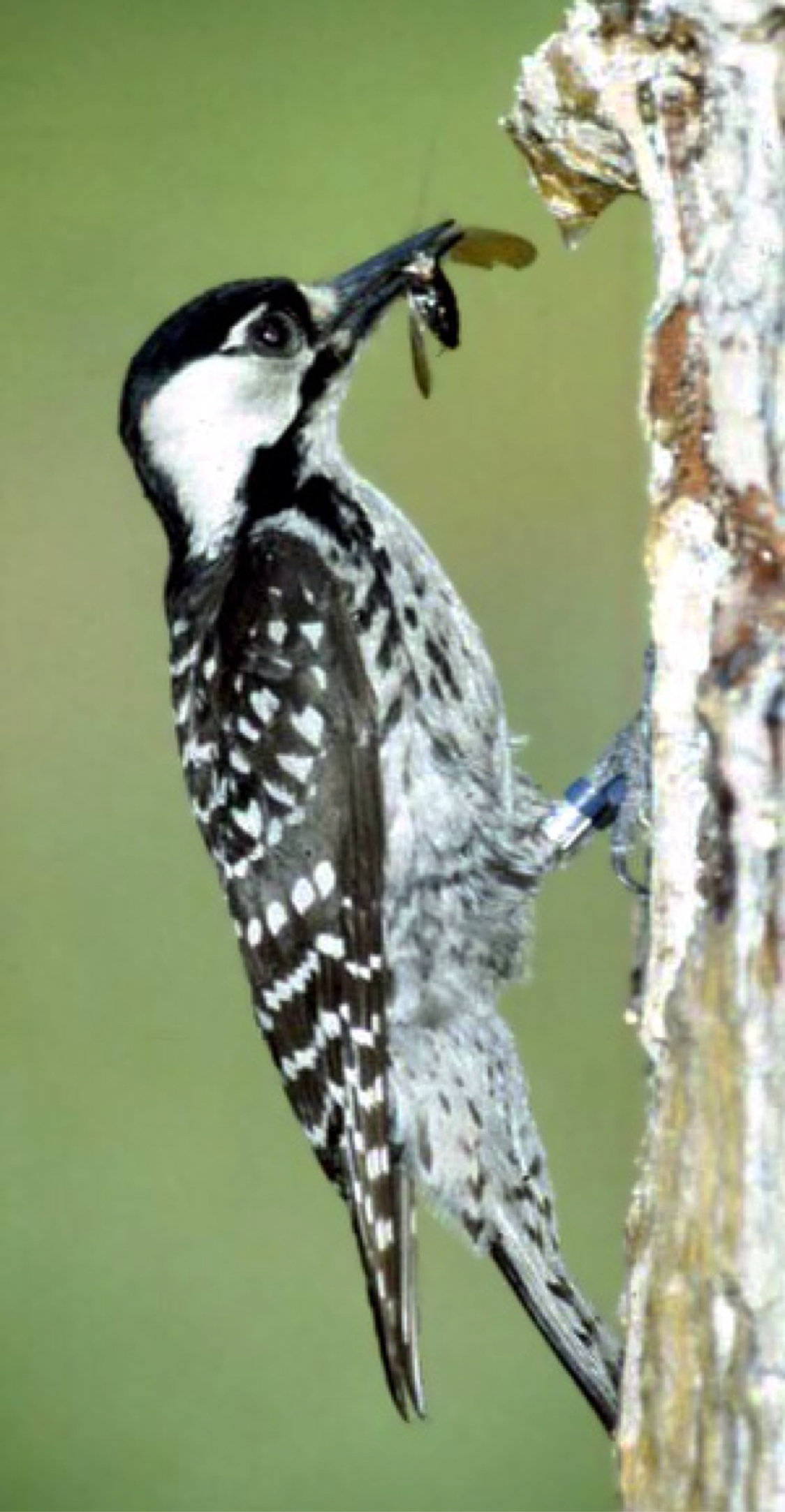
The red-cockaded woodpecker is found at Pettigrew State Park.

Lake Phelps and the Scuppernong River attract a wide variety of waterfowl. Lake Phelps is just one of several large, shallow freshwater lakes on the Pamlico-Albemarle Peninsula. These lakes are all winter grounds for ducks, geese and swans. The waterfowl at Lake Phelps use the area primarily for roosting purpose before flying off to nearby feeding sites. Tundra swans and Canada geese feed in nearby farm fields and the ducks feed in the wetlands. The waterfowl usually arrive in the area in October and overwinter until February or March. Commonly seen waterfowl are Canada geese, tundra swans, mallards, American black ducks and northern pintail.

Pettigrew State Park is home to several species of birds of prey. Ospreys build their nests in the tops of the tallest trees in the park and feed on the abundant fish of Lake Phelps. The population of bald eagles is increasing and they are occasionally seen over the park. At least three species of owl, the great horned owl, barred owl and eastern screech owl, make their home in the forests of the park, as do red tailed and red shouldered hawks. American kestrel and northern harriers also find suitable habitats at Pettigrew State Park.

Wading and woodland birds are year-round residents of Pettigrew State Park. The banks of Lake Phelps and the Scuppernong River provide an abundance of cover and food for sandpipers, great blue herons, great egrets, and green herons. The woods are home to bobwhites, pileated woodpeckers, woodcocks, red-cockaded woodpeckers, and mourning doves. Songbirds found at the park include prairie and prothonotary warblers, common yellowthroats and northern parulas.

Pettigrew State Park also provides habitats for eastern woodland mammals. Black bear and white-tailed deer inhabit the woods, as do Virginia opossum, raccoon, American mink, muskrat, North American river otter, fox, and bobcats. The endangered red wolf has been reintroduced to eastern North Carolina, including Pettigrew State Park.

The most common species are game fish, found in Lake Phelps, are largemouth bass, chain pickerel, catfish, yellow perch and pumpkinseed. These fish are what brought the Algonquian to the area nearly 10,000 years ago.

== Recreation ==
Pettigrew State Park is open for year-round recreation, including hiking, fishing, camping, boating and picnicking. Lake Phelps is open to canoes, kayaks, rowboats and engine-powered boats. Launch ramps are available at Cypress Point and behind the park offices on Lake Shore Drive. There is a canoe trail in the canals that were built by African slave labor during the plantation era. The Scuppernong River is also open to most types of watercraft.

The main campground is in a cypress and sweetgum forest, with 13 campsites that are open to tents or camping trailers. Each site comes equipped with a picnic table and charcoal grill. . A large group camping area is set in the forest. It has tent pads, grills and rustic toilet facilities. A centrally located bathhouse, open to all campers, includes flush toilets and showers.

Lake Phelps and the Scuppernong River are both open for fishing. The North Carolina Wildlife Resources Commission (NCWRC) has established fishing regulations, such as catch and length limits, that are meant to enhance sport fisheries in public waters such as Lake Phelps and the Scuppernong River. The NCWRC has had regulations in place at Pettigrew State Park since 2002. The regulations specify that anglers may keep largemouth bass that are greater than 20 inches (50.8 cm) or between 14 and 16 inches (35.6-40.6 cm). This rule was put in place to increase the number of trophy fish, fish over 20 inches (50.8 cm). Additionally the NCWRC stocks Lake Phelps with bluegill and they have begun a program to reintroduce alewife and blueback herring via fish ladder on Bee Tree Canal from the Scuppernong River.

Pettigrew State Park has one large picnic area available on a first come, first served basis. Three hiking trails pass the shore of Lake Phelps and wind through the woods.
