= William E. Phelps =

American politician

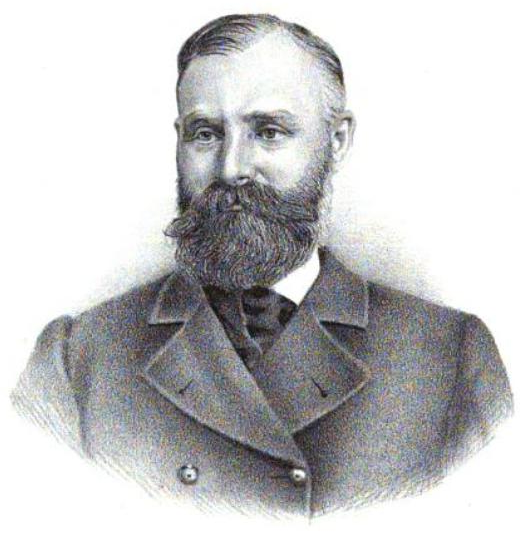
- Born: October 9, 1835; Elmwood, Illinois
- Died: February 8, 1914 (aged 78); Seattle, Washington
- Spouse: Ellen A. Wiley
- Father: William J. Phelps

William Edwin Phelps (1835–1914) was an American politician from Peoria County, Illinois. During the Civil War, he served as Consulate General of Saint Petersburg, Russia. In 1868, he was elected to one term in the Illinois House of Representatives.

== Biography ==
William E. Phelps was born on October 9, 1835, in what would become Elmwood, Illinois. His father, William J. Phelps, founded the settlement. The family descended from early American settler William Phelps. When Phelps was fourteen, he began to attend Farmington Academy in winters while working on the family farm in the summers. He graduated from Knox College when he was twenty-one and returned to the farm.

More so than his father, Phelps was active in political affairs. When the Republican Party first fielded candidates in 1856, Phelps was a staunch supporter. He helped to organize a volunteer unit for the Civil War in Elmwood. In November 1863, Phelps was appointed Consulate General of Saint Petersburg, Russia, where he served for three years. While back in Illinois on May 17, 1864, during a leave of absence, he married Ellen A. Wiley. He learned about negotiations in Kronstadt regarding a sale of a steamboat to the Confederates for use as a blockade runner and provided information so that the Navy could intercept it before it saw use. He resigned in 1865 and returned to the family farm. In 1868, Phelps was elected as a Republican to the Illinois House of Representatives. However, after serving one term there, he became burdened by his business interests and resigned from politics. Phelps died on February 8, 1914, in Seattle.
