= Teresa Godwin Phelps =

American legal scholar and writer (born 1944)

- Occupation: Author
- Known for: Legal Rhetoric Program Director, author of legal texts, advocacy for peace and human rights
- Spouse: Digger Phelps
- Children: 3
- Awards: Grenville Clark Award (1999); Legal Writing Institute's Courage Award (2009)

Academic background
- Education: University of Notre Dame (B.A., M.A., Ph.D.); Yale Law School (M.S.L.)

Academic work
- Discipline: Law
- Institutions: University of Notre Dame Law School; American University's Washington College of Law

Teresa Godwin Phelps is an American author and professor of law. She taught at the University of Notre Dame Law School from 1980 until 2006. She also taught at American University's Washington College of Law where she was the Director of the Legal Rhetoric Program from 2006 until she retired in 2019. Phelps is the author of several books and over 30 articles.

== Education ==
Phelps earned a B.A. from University of Notre Dame in 1973. She earned an M.A. from the same institution in 1975 before completing a Ph.D. in English in 1980. She earned a M.S.L. from Yale Law School in 1989.

== Career ==
Phelps began teaching legal writing at Notre Dame Law School in 1980. She moved to American University's Washington College of Law in 2006 as a professor of law and the Director of the Legal Rhetoric Program. At Notre Dame, she was also a Fellow at the Joan B. Kroc Institute for International Peace Studies. In 1999, at Notre Dame, she was awarded the Grenville Clark Award, a university-wide award for an individual whose activities advance the cause of peace and human rights. In 2009, the Legal Writing Institute gave her its Courage Award, which is given to a person who has demonstrated acts of personal, moral, or civil courage. In 2016, the Legal Writing Institute established the Teresa Godwin Phelps Award for Scholarship in Legal Communication, an annual national award.

== Selected works ==
=== Selected articles ===
- Phelps, Teresa Godwin (1986). "The New Legal Rhetoric". Southwestern Law Journal. 40 (4): 1089–1102.
- Phelps, Teresa Godwin (2020) Rewritten Opinion in AFSCME v. State of Washington. in Feminist Judgments: Rewritten Employment Law Decisions. Ann C. McGinley and Nicole Buonocore Porter, eds. Cambridge University Press.
- Phelps, Teresa Godwin (2016). "The Evolving Rhetoric of the Gay Rights and Same-Sex Marriage Debate." in "Rhetoric and Legal Judgments: How Language and Arguments Shape Struggles for Rights and Power." Austin Sarat, ed. Cambridge University Press.
- Phelps, Teresa Godwin (2014). "Truth Delayed: Accounting for Human Rights Abuses in Guatemala and Spain." Human Rights Quarterly.
- Phelps, Teresa Godwin (2013. "The Symbolic and Communicative Function of International Criminal Trials. in "Feminist Perspectives on Transitional Justice." Intersentia Press.
- Phelps, Teresa Godwin. (2011). "The Ethics of Narrative: "A Nation's Role in Victim/Survivor Storytelling." "Ethical Perspectives" published by European Centre for Ethics. K.U Leuven.
- Phelps, Teresa Godwin (2006). "Narrative Capability: Telling Stories in a Search for Justice." in "Transforming Unjust Structures: The Capability Approach." Springer.
- Phelps, Teresa Godwin (1998). "If Power Changes Purpose: Images of Authority in Literature and Film." in "The Moral Imagination: How Literature and Film Can Stimulate Ethical Reflection in the Business World." Notre Dame Press.
- Phelps, Teresa Godwin (1998). "Gendered Space and the Reasonableness Standard in Sexual Harassment Cases." Notre Dame Journal of Law, Ethics and Public Policy.
- Phelps, Teresa Godwin (1994). "The Margins of Maycomb: A Rereading of 'To Kill a Mockingbird.'" Alabama Law Review.

=== Books ===
- Phelps, Teresa Godwin (1990). Problems and Cases for Legal Writing (Rev. 2nd ed.). National Institute for Trial Advocacy, Notre Dame Law School. ISBN 978-1-55681-225-5.
- Phelps, Teresa Godwin (2004). Shattered Voices: Language, Violence, and the Work of Truth Commissions. University of Pennsylvania Press. ISBN 978-0-8122-0327-1.
- Phelps, Teresa Godwin (2007). Después de la violencia y la opresión: es posible crear justicia (in Spanish). Universidad Iberoamericana. ISBN 9789685123372.
- Phelps, Teresa Godwin (1994). The Coach's Wife: A Notre Dame Memoir. W. W. Norton & Company, Inc. ISBN 978-0393034707
