= Robert Phelps (disambiguation) =

Robert Phelps (1926–2013) was an American mathematician

Robert Phelps may also refer to:

- Robert Phelps (academic) (1808–1890), British academic
- Robert Phelps (wrestler) (1890–?), British wrestler
- Robert Phelps (pentathlete) (born 1939), British modern pentathlete
- Robert Phelps (pole vaulter), winner of the 1944 and 1945 NCAA DI outdoor pole vault championships
