= Elmwood, Illinois =

Elmwood
- City
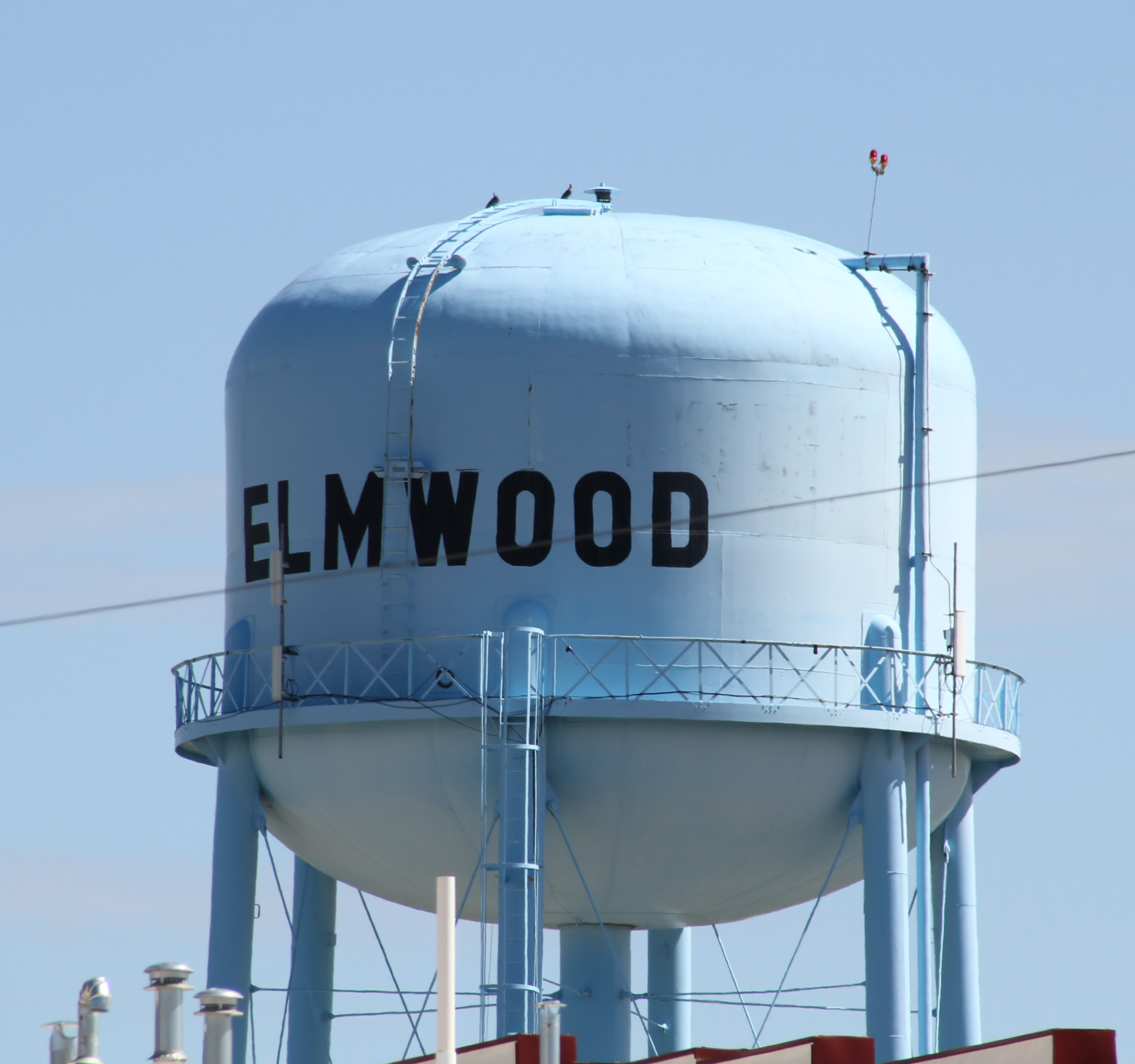
- Elmwood Water Tower

- Location of Elmwood in Peoria County, Illinois.
- Coordinates: 40°46′49″N 89°57′58″W
- Country: United States
- State: Illinois
- County: Peoria
- First settled: 1834
- Founded: 1854

Government
  - Mayor: Andrew Almasi

Area
  - Total: 1.40 sq mi (3.62 km^{2})
  - Land: 1.40 sq mi (3.62 km^{2})
  - Water: 0 sq mi (0.00 km^{2})
- Elevation: 630 ft (190 m)

Population (2020)
  - Total: 2,058
  - Estimate (2024): 2,041
  - Density: 1,474.3/sq mi (569.23/km^{2})
- Time zone: UTC−6 (CST)
  - Summer (DST): UTC−5 (CDT)
- ZIP code: 61529
- Area code: 309
- FIPS code: 17-23698
- GNIS ID: 2394676
- Website: City of Elmwood Illinois

Elmwood is a city in Peoria County, Illinois, United States. As of the 2020 census, Elmwood had a population of 2,058. Elmwood is part of the Peoria, Illinois Metropolitan Statistical Area.

== History ==
The settlement was named after a community of elm trees near the mansion of William J. Phelps, who was among the first settlers to arrive in the area in 1834. Phelps was the first postmaster and owned a barn that was part of the Underground Railroad. The town was platted in 1852 and officially founded two years later.

On the night of June 5, 2010, an elephant trunk tornado touched down in Elmwood, destroying city hall and other area buildings, bringing down limbs and power lines, and damaging the roof of a theater. Although Elmwood suffered a great deal from the tornado, many town businesses eventually re-opened.

== Geography ==
According to the 2010 census, Elmwood has a total area of 1.43 square miles (3.70 km^{2}), all land.

== Demographics ==
Historical population
Census	Pop.	Note	%±
1860	1,182		—
1870	1,476		24.9%
1880	1,504		1.9%
1890	1,548		2.9%
1900	1,582		2.2%
1910	1,390		−12.1%
1920	1,242		−10.6%
1930	1,166		−6.1%
1940	1,348		15.6%
1950	1,613		19.7%
1960	1,882		16.7%
1970	2,014		7.0%
1980	2,117		5.1%
1990	1,841		−13.0%
2000	1,945		5.6%
2010	2,097		7.8%
2020	2,058		−1.9%
U.S. Decennial Census

=== Racial and ethnic composition ===
Elmwood city, Illinois – Racial and ethnic composition Note: the US Census treats Hispanic/Latino as an ethnic category. This table excludes Latinos from the racial categories and assigns them to a separate category. Hispanics/Latinos may be of any race.
Race / Ethnicity (NH = Non-Hispanic)	Pop 2000	Pop 2010	Pop 2020	% 2000	% 2010	% 2020
White alone (NH)	1,908	2,023	1,932	98.10%	96.47%	93.88%
Black or African American alone (NH)	3	6	3	0.15%	0.29%	0.15%
Native American or Alaska Native alone (NH)	7	0	0	0.36%	0.00%	0.00%
Asian alone (NH)	3	11	5	0.15%	0.52%	0.24%
Native Hawaiian or Pacific Islander alone (NH)	0	0	0	0.00%	0.00%	0.00%
Other race alone (NH)	0	1	2	0.00%	0.05%	0.10%
Mixed race or Multiracial (NH)	8	17	77	0.41%	0.81%	3.74%
Hispanic or Latino (any race)	16	39	39	0.82%	1.86%	1.90%
Total	1,945	2,097	2,058	100.00%	100.00%	100.00%

=== 2020 census ===
As of the 2020 census, Elmwood had a population of 2,058. The median age was 40.3 years. 26.2% of residents were under the age of 18 and 18.7% of residents were 65 years of age or older. For every 100 females there were 95.6 males, and for every 100 females age 18 and over there were 91.8 males age 18 and over.

0.0% of residents lived in urban areas, while 100.0% lived in rural areas.

There were 819 households in Elmwood, of which 34.1% had children under the age of 18 living in them. Of all households, 53.5% were married-couple households, 15.1% were households with a male householder and no spouse or partner present, and 26.0% were households with a female householder and no spouse or partner present. About 28.3% of all households were made up of individuals and 15.9% had someone living alone who was 65 years of age or older.

There were 902 housing units, of which 9.2% were vacant. The homeowner vacancy rate was 4.2% and the rental vacancy rate was 9.1%.

=== 2000 census ===
As of the 2000 United States census, there were 1,945 people, 772 households, and 565 families residing in the city. The population density was 1,577.1 inhabitants per square mile (608.9/km^{2}). There were 806 housing units at an average density of 653.5 per square mile (252.3/km^{2}). The racial makeup of the city was 98.71% White, 0.15% African American, 0.36% Native American, 0.15% Asian, 0.05% from other races, and 0.57% from two or more races. Hispanic or Latino of any race were 0.82% of the population.

There were 772 households, out of which 34.2% had children under the age of 18 living with them, 63.3% were married couples living together, 7.6% had a female householder with no husband present, and 26.8% were non-families. 24.6% of all households were made up of individuals, and 14.1% had someone living alone who was 65 years of age or older. The average household size was 2.50 and the average family size was 2.99.

In the city, the age distribution of the population shows 26.5% under the age of 18, 6.1% from 18 to 24, 27.8% from 25 to 44, 22.8% from 45 to 64, and 16.9% who were 65 years of age or older. The median age was 39 years. For every 100 females, there were 88.5 males. For every 100 females age 18 and over, there were 84.8 males.

The median income for a household in the city was $44,500, and the median income for a family was $51,505. Males had a median income of $37,981 versus $22,557 for females. The per capita income for the city was $19,797. About 2.4% of families and 2.8% of the population were below the poverty line, including 2.6% of those under age 18 and 3.5% of those age 65 or over.

== Culture ==
Elmwood is mentioned in Life and Times of Frederick Douglass (1881); Frederick Douglass gave a lyceum lecture in early February 1871 "on one of the frostiest and coldest nights I have ever experienced." Needing a place to stay in Peoria the following night, Elmwood citizen E.R. Brown suggested to Douglass that orator Robert G. Ingersoll "would gladly open his doors to you."

Elmwood hosts an annual Strawberry Festival in June, and an annual Fall Festival in September.

Central Park features a statue by Elmwood native, Lorado Taft, called The Pioneers.

== Education ==
The school district is Elmwood Community Unit School District 322.

== Notable people ==
- L. R. Kershaw, Oklahoma pioneer, cattleman, and politician; born in Elmwood
- Lora Marx, sculptor; born in Elmwood
- Tim Monroe, racing driver; born in Elmwood
- James D. Putnam, lawyer, business, and politician; lived in Elmwood
- Lorado Taft, sculptor ("The Pioneers"), born in Elmwood
