= Willie Philp =

Scottish footballer

Personal information
- Place of birth: Scotland
- Positions: Centre forward; right half

Senior career*
Years	Team	Apps	(Gls)
–1913	New York Celtic		
1913–1921	Cowdenbeath	25	(18)
1921–1924	New York	36	(3)
1924–1926	New York Giants	24	(6)
- * Club domestic league appearances and goals

Willie Philp was a Scottish professional football centre forward who played in the Scottish League for Cowdenbeath. Either side of his spell with Cowdenbeath, he played in the United States.

== Career statistics ==
Appearances and goals by club, season and competition
Club	Season	League			National Cup		Total	
Club	Season	Division	Apps	Goals	Apps	Goals	Apps	Goals
Cowdenbeath	1913–14	Scottish Second Division	4	6	3	0	7	6
Cowdenbeath	1914–15	Scottish Second Division	21	12	0	0	21	12
Career total			25	18	3	0	28	18

== Honours ==
Cowdenbeath

- Scottish League Second Division (2): 1913–14, 1914–15

Individual

- Cowdenbeath Hall of Fame
