= David Sutton Phelps Jr. =

American professor and anthropologist

David Sutton Phelps Jr. (1930 – February 21, 2009) was an American professor and anthropologist. He was born in Fort Pierce, Florida. From 1970–1996 Phelps taught anthropology at East Carolina University, which named an archaeology lab after him. Before teaching at East Carolina University Phelps had taught at Tulane University, Florida State University, and Briefly at the University Of Georgia, respectively in that order.

Phelps worked on many archaeological sites, some of his more notable sites are the Tar River site, the Neoheroka Fort Tuscarora war site (near snow hill), Lake Phelps, Fort Raleigh (near Manteo), and Hatteras Island. Tar river showed evidence of human occupation more than 11,000 years ago. At the Hatteras island near Buxton a 16th-century signet ring that may have belonged to the lost colonists. In 1992 Lake Phelps was archaeologically explored and over 30 ancient canoes were found.

Out of the 30 canoes only 23 have been measured and studied. The process of making these canoes is through splitting a Cyprus log and burning/scraping the interior until the desired shape is acquired. The earliest inhabitants associated with this region are represented by small spear points of the palmer type dating back to the period of 8000BCE – 9000BCE. The late archaic period (3000BCE – 1000BCE) was represented by such items as spear points, spear thrower weight and bi-facial blades. Cooking vessels made of soap stone. The three earliest dated canoes belong to this time period. The early woodland period was between 1000BCE- 300BCE) and was found to contain fabrics and artistic designs on paddles. Two of the canoes were found to belong to this period. The middle woodland period between 300BCE and 800AD and is classified as the most active time period for the site. 8 of the canoes belong to this time period. The late woodland culture from 800AD to 1650 is attributed with being the ancestral culture of the Carolina Algonkians. Only 3 canoes were found to belong to this time period.

In 1998 Phelps discovered an unusual ball of clay that was later revealed to be a 10 carat gold signet ring. The ring is engraved with a prancing lion and is believed to date back to the 16th century.

David Phelps, director of the East Carolina University Archaeology laboratory at the time, retired from East Carolina University in 2000 and moved back to Florida. On February 21, 2009 Phelps died at the age of 79.
