= Digger Phelps =

American college basketball coach and broadcaster

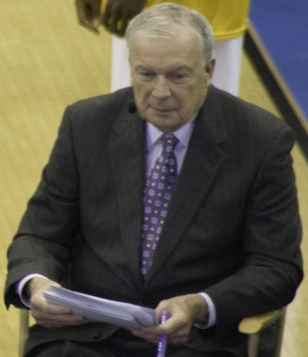
- Phelps on ESPN's College Gameday broadcast in 2008

Biographical details
- Born: July 4, 1941 (age 85); Beacon, New York, U.S.

Playing career
- 1960–1963: Rider

Coaching career (HC unless noted)
- 1963–1964: Rider (GA)
- 1965–1966: St. Gabriel's HS (PA)
- 1966–1969: Penn (assistant)
- 1970–1971: Fordham
- 1971–1991: Notre Dame

Head coaching record
- Overall: 419–200 (.677) (college)
- Tournaments: 17–17 (NCAA Division I); 7–3 (NIT)

Accomplishments and honors

Championships
- NCAA Regional – Final Four (1978)

Awards
- Sporting News Coach of the Year Award (1974); UPI Coach of the Year (1974)

Richard Frederick "Digger" Phelps (born July 4, 1941) is an American former college basketball coach, most notably of the Notre Dame Fighting Irish from 1971 to 1991. For 20 years, from 1993 to 2014, he served as an analyst on ESPN. He got the nickname "Digger" from his friends.

== Early life ==
Phelps was born in Beacon, New York. His family ran a funeral home business in the city. He worked at his father's business on weekends and during summer. He got the nickname "digger" from his friends.

== Coaching career ==
=== Early career ===
Phelps began his coaching career in 1963 as a graduate assistant at Rider College (now Rider University), where he had played basketball. After a move to St. Gabriel's High School in Hazleton, Pennsylvania, he obtained his first full assistant job in 1966 at the University of Pennsylvania in Philadelphia.

His first head coaching job came in 1970 at Fordham University in The Bronx, where he coached Charlie Yelverton and P. J. Carlesimo, the athletic director's son. Phelps led the Rams to a 24–2 record in the 1970–71 regular season and a #9 national ranking.

Fordham received an at-large bid to the 25-team NCAA tournament, where they advanced to the Sweet Sixteen, and won the consolation game for third place in the East regional.

In May 1971 at age 29, Phelps was named head coach at the University of Notre Dame.

=== Notre Dame ===
During his 20 seasons (1971–91) tenure, Phelps' Notre Dame teams went 393–197 (.666), with 14 seasons of 20 wins or more. In 1978, Notre Dame made its only Final Four appearance to date. His most-remembered game occurred in 1974, when the second-ranked Fighting Irish scored the last 12 points of the game on January 19 to upset top-ranked UCLA, coached by John Wooden, 71–70, ending the Bruins' record 88-game winning streak. He shares the NCAA record for most upsets over a #1 team at seven with Gary Williams:

Date	Opponent	Score
January 19, 1974	UCLA	71–70
March 5, 1977	San Francisco	93–82
February 26, 1978	Marquette	65–59
February 27, 1980	DePaul	76–74 (2ot)
December 27, 1980	Kentucky	67–61
February 22, 1981	Virginia	57–56
February 1, 1987	North Carolina	60–58

== Broadcasting career ==
Phelps began his broadcasting career when he served as a commentator for ABC Sports' basketball coverage at the 1984 Summer Olympics in Los Angeles. In 1992, he continued his broadcasting career when he provided color commentary for that year's NCAA tournament for CBS. He joined ESPN the next season and worked for them until 2014 as a college basketball studio and game analyst.

During the April 7, 2014 broadcast of College GameDay, Phelps announced that he was leaving ESPN. "I spent 20 years at Notre Dame as a coach and now 20 years here at ESPN doing a great job with all you people. And now it's time for me to move forward, and this will be my last time on TV," Phelps said. Phelps added: "It's been a great run. Twenty years is always my target for everything, and it's time to move forward."

== Personal life ==
Phelps resides in South Bend with his wife Terry, and has three adult children. His eldest, Karen, was married to baseball pitcher Jamie Moyer. He is a member of the Tau Kappa Epsilon fraternity at Rider College.

Phelps was instrumental in the restoration of various programs at John McDonogh High School in New Orleans post-Hurricane Katrina. His gifts helped to restore the sports program and helped to launch a four-year Culinary Academy in partnership with the Louisiana Restaurant Association Education Foundation and the Recovery School District on December 15, 2010.

== Cancer battle ==
In April 2013, Phelps was diagnosed with bladder cancer. On July 1, 2013, his doctor declared him in remission.

== Head coaching record ==
Record table
Season	Team	Overall	Conference	Standing	Postseason
Fordham Rams (NCAA independent) (1970–1971)
1970–71	Fordham	26–3			NCAA University Division Sweet 16
Notre Dame Fighting Irish (NCAA independent) (1971–1991)
1971–72	Notre Dame	6–20			
1972–73	Notre Dame	18–12			NIT Runner-up
1973–74	Notre Dame	26–3			NCAA Division I Sweet 16
1974–75	Notre Dame	19–10			NCAA Division I Sweet 16
1975–76	Notre Dame	23–6			NCAA Division I Sweet 16
1976–77	Notre Dame	22–7			NCAA Division I Sweet 16
1977–78	Notre Dame	23–8			NCAA Division I Final Four
1978–79	Notre Dame	24–6			NCAA Division I Elite Eight
1979–80	Notre Dame	22–6			NCAA Division I second round
1980–81	Notre Dame	23–6			NCAA Division I Sweet 16
1981–82	Notre Dame	10–17			
1982–83	Notre Dame	19–10			NIT First Round
1983–84	Notre Dame	21–12			NIT Runner-up
1984–85	Notre Dame	21–9			NCAA Division I second round
1985–86	Notre Dame	23–6			NCAA Division I first round
1986–87	Notre Dame	24–8			NCAA Division I Sweet 16
1987–88	Notre Dame	20–9			NCAA Division I first round
1988–89	Notre Dame	21–7			NCAA Division I second round
1989–90	Notre Dame	16–13			NCAA Division I first round
1990–91	Notre Dame	12–20			
Notre Dame:		393–195			
Total:		419–198			

== See also ==
- List of NCAA Division I Men's Final Four appearances by coach
