= John Phelps (regicide) =

- Born: circa 1619; Salisbury, Wiltshire, England
- Died: after 1666; Lausanne, Switzerland
- Resting place: St Martin's Cathedral, Vevey, Switzerland
- Occupations: Clerk and government servant
- Known for: Clerk of the High Court at the trial of Charles I

John Phelps was a Clerk and Registrar of the Committee for Plundered Ministers and of the High Court which tried Charles I of England for high treason in 1649.

== Early life ==
Not much is known about John Phelps' early life. He was born in about 1619 in Salisbury, Wiltshire, England. He matriculated at Corpus Christi College, Oxford, on 20 May 1636, describing himself as age 17, and the son of Robert Phelps of Salisbury. On 1 January 1648-9 he was appointed clerk-assistant to Henry Elsing, clerk of the House of Commons.

Says Harper's Pictorial History of England, edition of 1849, pp 111–377, "The name was anciently spelled 'Phyllypes,' but has always been pronounced 'Phelps.' After the time of Edward IV, the superfluous letters were dropped.

== Phelps' opposition to the High Church and Charles I ==
This family opposed the High Church, the Prerogative Party of Stafford, and Bishop Laud. They felt the British church and government under Charles I was becoming insufferably hieratic, tyrannical, and tax-hungry. Common resentment among the English people led soon to the English Revolution beginning in 1642. Agents intercepted his secret invitations to foreign kings and armies, that they invade England, crush Parliament and the English Constitution, massacre his English opponents, and restore Charles to his pretended Dei gratia royal privileges. This eventually led to the beheading of King Charles for treason in 1649. Those who opposed him felt that Charles Stuart incorrigibly continued to hold his dynastic interest separate and above those of Parliament and the British people, and ultimately Parliament had no alternative but to end his conspiracies, par coup de hache ("by blow of axe").

== Phelps role in the trial of Charles I ==
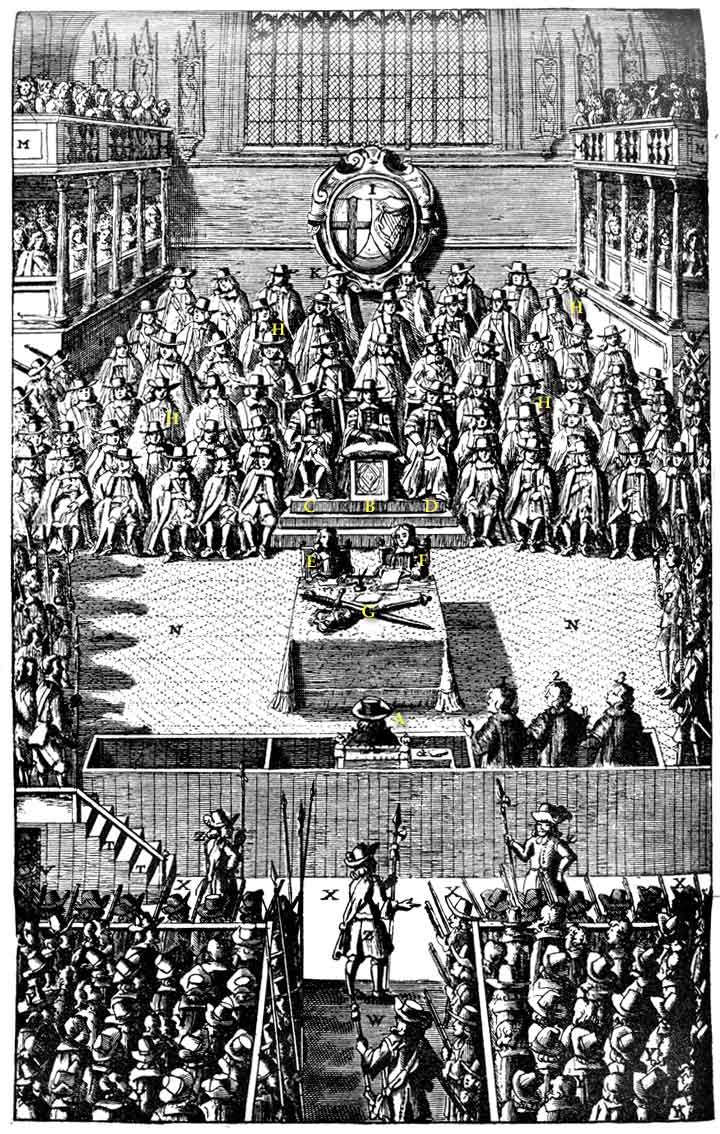
A plate depicting the Trial of Charles I on 4 January 1649, from "Nalson's Record of the Trial of Charles I, 1688" in the British Museum.

In 1648-49, John Phelps was called by England's Rump Parliament to serve as Clerk of High Court at the trial of King Charles I. He became private secretary to Oliver Cromwell, and in the illustration at right of the trial of Charles I, is illustrated sitting on the right of the table in the center of the room. "Extracts from a True Copy of the Journal of the High Court Of Justice for the Tryal of K. Charles I:" "And in order to the more regular and due proceedings of the said Court, they nominate officers, and accordingly chose Mr. Aske, Dr. Dorislaus, Mr. Steel and Mr. Cooke, counsel, to attend the said Court. Mr. Greaves and Mr. John Phelpes, clerks, to whom notice thereof was ordered to be given." (page 7)

"Mr. Andrew Broughton attended according to former order, and it was thereupon again Ordered, That Andrew Broughton and John Phelpes be, and they are hereby constituted clerks of the said Court, and injoyned [sic] to give their attendance from time to time accordingly." (page 12)

During the trial, "on the Tuesday afternoon in Westminster Hall, the King again refused to recognise the jurisdiction of the Court;" John Phelps as the Clerk "formally demanded his answer, [the King] refused, and default was recorded." Under English law at the time, a refusal to enter a plea was entered as a guilty plea.

"Painted Chamber, Feb. 2nd, 1648." The commissioners being met. (Various orders were made after which.)" (page 122)

"Attested per John Phelpes, clerk to the said Court. (At end of all.)" (page 123)

"Examined and attested to be a true copy from the original. by me. John Nalson."

== Reputation and government service after the trial ==
In Clarendon's correspondence with the Lord President, 1685-6, Wealsman, "John Phelps of Vevey, ill reputation and sheriff thereof." Answer: "Mr. Phelps is so far from being of ill reputation that there is not any man in the county, nor in the army, under a better character. He is son of a loyal gentleman, Col. Edward Phelps, and brother of Sir Edward Phelps of Somerset."

John Phelps was a prominent man in the party to which he had attached himself. He was clerk and registrar of the Committee for Plundered Ministers, and had chambers in the Old Palace in which the committee sat. On 14 October 1652, he was appointed clerk to the committee of Parliament which had been named to confer with deputies from Scotland. He was to be allowed a clerk assistant, and it was ordered that a request be made to the first-named committee to dispense with his attendance in the meantime.

John Phelps was given instructions for "matting the room in which they were to meet, and for fitting it up so that it might be very warm. At a later period Henry Scobell, clerk of Parliament, was required to deliver to John Phelps all papers and books returned from Scotland touching delinquents and sequestrations."

A petition having been presented to the Council of State by John, Earl of Crawford, order was made 1 September 1653, that Mr Phelps examine his books as to what was done by the Commissioners who had then lately been sent into Scotland as to whether any order was given by them for allowing the Earl's wife the fifth part of his estate for maintenance of herself and children. Shortly afterwards, 8 October, in the same year, three persons, of whom Mr Phelps was one, were appointed to sort the Scotch records in the Tower of London, to report to the council, and in the meantime not to permit any records to go to Scotland but what should be particularly viewed by them.

== Purchases Hampton Court ==
He had purchased the manor and royalty of Hampton Court on the banks of the River Thames, part of the inheritance of the Crown, with which those who were then in power arrogated to themselves the right to deal. But this property in every way so desirable, was not to remain with John Phelps, for the first among them had set his heart upon it, and his wish must be gratified. The matter was worked out in due form and, by a committee, negotiations were opened with Phelps, the upshot being that an agreement for repurchase at £750 was concluded and the attorney-general was to direct the preparation of such assurances as would settle the property to "His Highness' " use, that is, to the use of Oliver, Lord Protector of the Commonwealth of England. There was no attempt to push the price to an extreme figure, Phelps was too shrewd a mail for anything of that kind seeing that of two valuations, one was higher by £266 than the price he had agreed to accept.

The affair was concluded when, on 8 August 1654, a warrant was directed to the Commissioners of Excise to pay to Phelps the stipulated sum. It appears incidentally that John Phelps was well up in shorthand, which must have helped him more than a little, for he took in that way all the evidence adduced on the trial of three persons for endeavoring to raise forces against the Protector. Not long before the overthrow of his party, an order in Parliament was made on 13 May 1659, that £50 be given to John Phelps for his services as clerk of Parliament, and the money was paid soon afterwards.

Ample evidence has thus been adduced that Phelps was very useful to his party, and was not only willing but able to serve it in important capacities, whilst his continued employment show that, so far, his services were understood. This on the one side, and on the other not a word has been found which suggests that he was unduly recompensed, so that he is not to be numbered amongst the many whom, at the public cost, the Cromwellites rewarded with a lavish and unsparing hand, far beyond anything that was legitimate.

== Prosecution after the Restoration ==
In August 1660, following the Restoration of Charles II, the Act of Indemnity and Oblivion was passed as a gesture of reconciliation to reunite the kingdom. A free pardon was granted to everyone who had supported the Commonwealth and Protectorate, except for those who had directly participated in the trial and execution of King Charles I eleven years previously. In England, a special court was appointed and in October 1660 those regicides who were still alive and living in Britain were brought to trial. Phelps was among those sought for prosecution.

III. William Lord Mounson, Sir Henry Mildmay, Sir James Harrington, Robert Wallop, and John Phelps, degraded. And be it further enacted by the Authority aforesaid That William Lord Mounson Sir Henry Mildmay Sir James Harrington Robert Wallop Esquire and John Phelps and every of them shall be and are hereby degraded from and made uncapable of all and every the Titles of Honour Dignities and Preheminencies which they or any of them now have or which at any time hereafter may descend unto them And that neither they or any of them shall att any time hereafter have beare or use the Name Stile Addition or Title of Lord Baronett Knight Esquire or Gentleman or any of them nor shall use or have any Coates or Escutcheons of Armes whatsoever nor any other legall Title or addition whatsoever but shall be for ever reputed and are hereby declared to bee Persons of Dishonour and Infamy.

Phelps penalty, should he be arrested, was to be "drawne upon Sledges with Ropes about theire necks:"

IV. William Mounson; Henry Mildmay, James Harrington, Robert Wallop, and John Phelps, to be drawn to Tyburn, as Persons executed for Treason, and back, and then imprisoned. And further that they the said William Mounson Henry Mildmay James Harrington Robert Wallop and John Phelps and every of them shall upon the seaven and twentieth day of January which shall be in the yeare of our Lord One thousand six hundred sixty one or so soon after as they shall be apprehended carried to the Tower of London and from thence drawne upon Sledges with Ropes about theire necks and according to the manner of persons executed for High Treason quite through the streets of London unto the Gallows att Tiburn and from thence in like manner be brought back again to the Tower of London and or in such other Prison as his Majesty shall thinke fitt continue Prisoners and suffer paines of Imprisonment for and during the term of theire naturall lives.

== Exile after the Restoration ==
Phelps evaded pursuit and was at Lausanne, Switzerland in the company of Edmund Ludlow, one of the regicides, and fellow clerk Andrew Broughton. Broughton and Phelps were fortunate to live out their lives in exile in Vevey, Switzerland. During the English Restoration, any goods which he still owned in England were confiscated. Phelps died after 1666 and was buried in St Martin's Cathedral, alongside Edmund Ludlow, one of the judges who condemned Charles I, and his fellow clerk Andrew Broughton.

== St Martin's Church Memorial ==
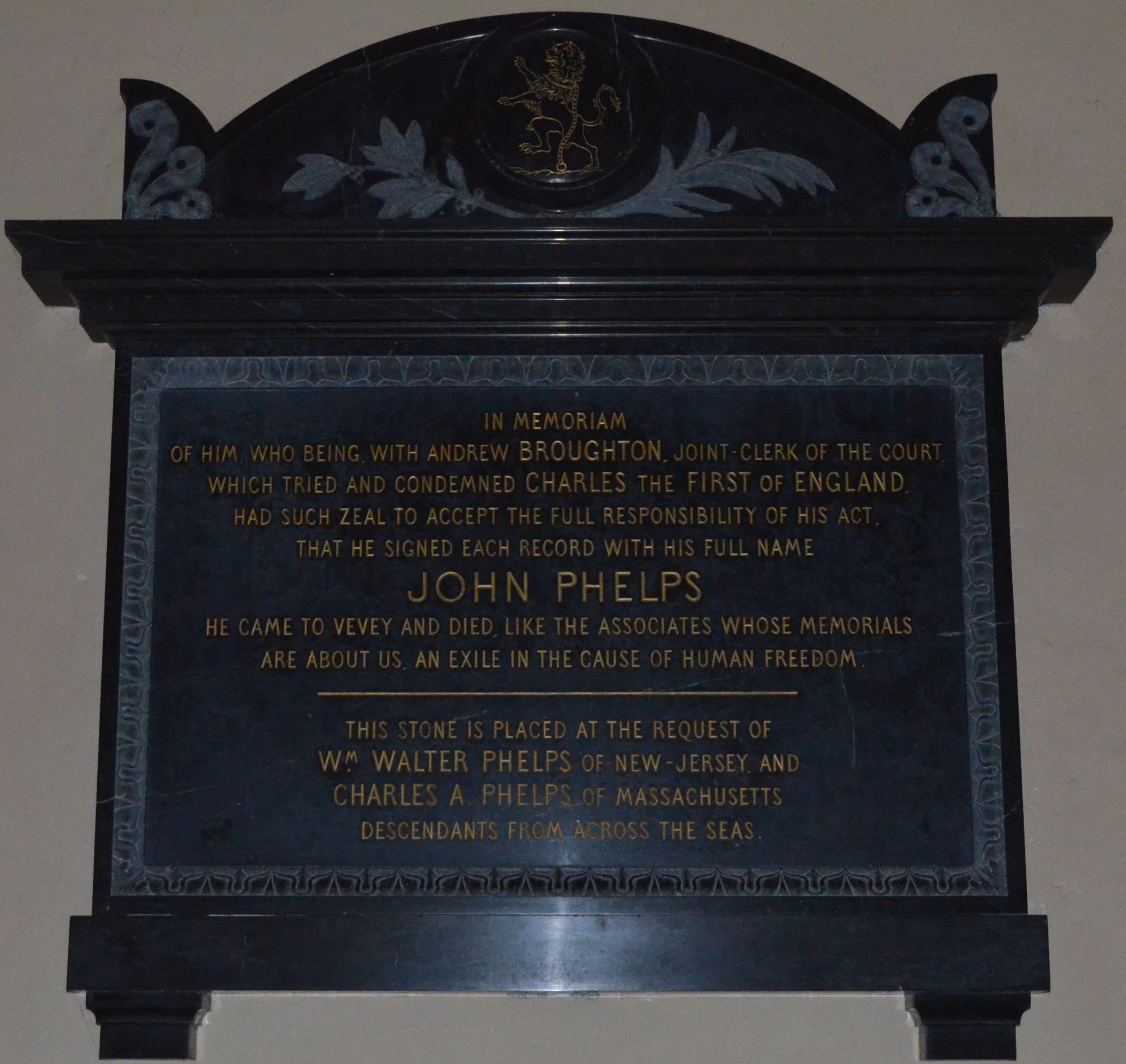
In St Martin's Church, Vevey, Switzerland, "may be seen this black marble monument, erected in 1882, though the liberality of the late Hon. William Walter Phelps, of Teaneck, New Jersey, and the Hon. Charles A. Phelps, M.D. of Massachusetts." William Walter Phelps was later the United States Ambassador to Prague, Czechoslovakia.

In 1881, President of the United States James A. Garfield named William Walter Phelps minister to Austria-Hungary, but he held this post for only a few months, resigning after Garfield was assassinated. It was apparently while serving in Austria-Hungary that William W. Phelps traveled to Vevey, Switzerland, where he and the Hon. Charles A. Phelps, M.D. of Massachusetts, commissioned a memorial to their ancestor John Phelps.

The top of the monument contains the Phelps coat of arms, described as A Lion Rampant, Gorged with a Plain Collar, and Chained.

The text of the monument reads:

In Mermoriam Of Him who being with Andrew Broughton joint clerk of the Court which tried and condemned Charles the First of England, had such zeal to accept the full responsibility of his act, that he signed each record with his full name John Phelps. He came to Vevey, and died like the associates whose memorials are about us, an exile in the cause of human freedom. This slab is placed at the request of William Walter Phelps of New Jersey, and Charles A. Phelps of Massachusetts, descendants from across the seas.

This article is based in part upon material originally written by Brian Phelps and licensed for use in Wikipedia under the GFDL.
