= William J. Phelps =

American politician

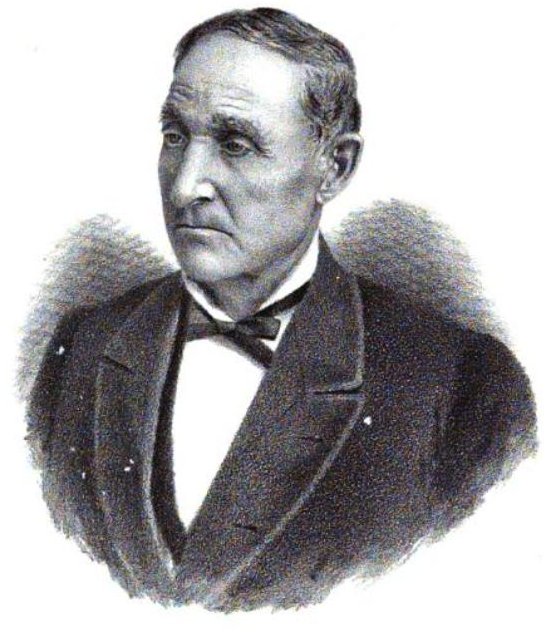
- Born: William Joshua Phelps; March 2, 1808; Burlington, Connecticut
- Died: February 20, 1883 (aged 74)
- Resting place: Elmwood Township Cemetery
- Spouse: Olivia B. Johnson (m. 1834)
- Children: William E. Phelps

William Joshua Phelps (March 2, 1808 – February 20, 1883) was an American politician from Connecticut. Settling in Peoria County, Illinois, in 1834, Phelps became a prosperous miner was elected to the Illinois House of Representatives. Phelps' house was the namesake of Elmwood and Elmwood Township, Illinois. Descended from the colonist William Phelps, William J. Phelps is the father of William E. Phelps.

== Biography ==
William Joshua Phelps was born in Burlington, Connecticut, on March 2, 1808. He descended from William Phelps, who came to the United States in 1630 and was active in colonial government. He attended public school and worked on a farm during summers. He also attended a private academy. Phelps married Olivia B. Johnson on September 10, 1834. During his adulthood, Phelps would travel during winters for business. On one of these trips, he found an appealing area of Illinois and decided to move west and settle with his new wife. He arrived in Peoria County, Illinois, in October 1834.

Phelps owned over 2,000 acres (810 ha) in the county. The land was rich in coal, which Phelps was able to ship out through the Peoria and Oquawka Railroad (later the Chicago, Burlington and Quincy). Phelps donated the land for the railroad's right-of-way. In 1835, Phelps was elected a justice of the peace, and a year later he was named a county commissioner. Phelps was elected to the Illinois House of Representatives as a Whig in 1840, serving one two-year term. He defeated his opponent, Norman H. Purple, by only seven votes.

In 1866, Phelps founded a coal mining partnership with James Lee. The company eventually employed between 100 and 200 men. Phelps built a mansion near the mines and train station, which he named Elmwood after the surrounding grove of elm trees. When Phelps finally succeeded in securing a post office for the settlement in 1854, the town and township were named Elmwood and Elmwood Township. He had three children, though one died in infancy. His son William E. Phelps also served in the Illinois House. Phelps died on February 20, 1883, and was buried in Elmwood Township Cemetery.
