= Robert Philp (missionary) =

Scottish missionary to Kenya

The Reverend Robert Anderson Philp (25 February 1913 – 1 March 2008) was a Church of Scotland missionary in Kenya and acted as interpreter during the trial of Jomo Kenyatta in 1952.

== Early life ==
Robert Anderson Philp, born on 25 February 1913, was the only child of a Scottish missionary doctor, the Rev Dr Horace Philp, founder of Tumutumu Hospital near Nyeri, Kenya in the foothills of Mount Kenya. He was raised amongst the Kikuyu people of central Kenya, and was known for his mastery of the Gikuyu language as well as for the authenticity of his accent.

== Education ==
After his formative years, he went to George Watson's School in Edinburgh, Scotland and went to study divinity at the University of Edinburgh, after which he spent a year studying at the Budapest College of the Reformed Church in Hungary.

== Ministry in Kenya ==
In 1937 he returned to Kenya as a missionary, where his first station was at his birthplace Tumutumu. While there, he lived and worked as a missionary and also served as a chaplain in the British Army throughout World War II. In 1946 he married Jeane Caddick whom he had met while a student at the University of Edinburgh and after returning to Kenya set up home at Tumutumu.

He was well known for his love and identification with, the Kikuyu people of Kenya. During the Mau Mau insurgency, many of the Kikuyu who refused to take the Mau Mau oath were in danger of being killed. Philp successfully acted as a mediator on behalf of some of the Kikuyu to the British authorities.

Philp taught at St. Paul's University, Limuru, where he was active in preparing and equipping Africans to become ministers. He later became the first Church of Scotland missionary at Nakuru in the Great Rift Valley, and then worked at Thogoto, a village near Nairobi. He was well regarded for his work in encouraging close partnerships with his African colleagues, and was tireless in his efforts to foster good relations between Kenyans and Europeans.

== Kenyatta trial ==
In 1952 while serving as a missionary in Kenya he acted as interpreter during the trial of Jomo Kenyatta. Kenyatta was charged with "managing and being a member" of Mau Mau, the insurgency rebellion against British rule in Kenya. Although he knew English well, Kenyatta determined to speak only in his native language, Kikuyu. The role of court translator was initially given to the archaeologist Louis Leakey, but due to challenges to his translation, Leakey resigned and was replaced by Philp. After a guilty verdict was rendered in April 1953, Kenyatta received a sentence of seven years' hard labour and he remained in prison until 1959.

== Later ministry in the United Kingdom ==
After 23 years as a second-generation missionary, personal circumstances caused Philp reluctantly to resign in 1960, from the Church of Scotland Mission and leave Kenya. Philp became a Church of Scotland minister at Stepps, Scotland near Glasgow. Due to his influence, several of his congregation became missionaries or ministers. Philp retired in 1981, at the age of 69. He and his wife lived in Leeds, England where they became involved with a Congregational church, and later in Bath, where they became part of an Anglican church community.

In 1988 the Presbyterian Church of East Africa celebrated the 90th anniversary of the first Scottish missionaries' arrival in Kenya, and requested Philp to attend as guest of honour. While there, he returned to his birthplace, Tumutumu, and he discovered that he had retained his fluency in Kikuyu after 28 years in Britain.

The Presbyterian Church of East Africa's service of celebration at Thogoto was attended by more than 5,000 people, including President Daniel Arap Moi, and in his speech, as Philp spoke in Kikuyu, without notes, the attendees broke into spontaneous applause.

== Last days ==
After his wife Jeanne died in 2005, he lived for the rest of his life at Bybrook Nursing Home near Bath, but he always had a love for Kenya, and it was his Kikuyu Bible that he chose to read, rather than an English one. He and his wife had three daughters, Mary, Joan and Dorothy.

Philp died on 1 March 2008. His funeral service was held at All Saints' Church, Weston, England. On 18 March 2008 and his ashes were buried in Kenya, among the Kikuyu people, because, as he once said, "after all, that is where I am from."
