= John E. Phelps =

John Elisha Phelps
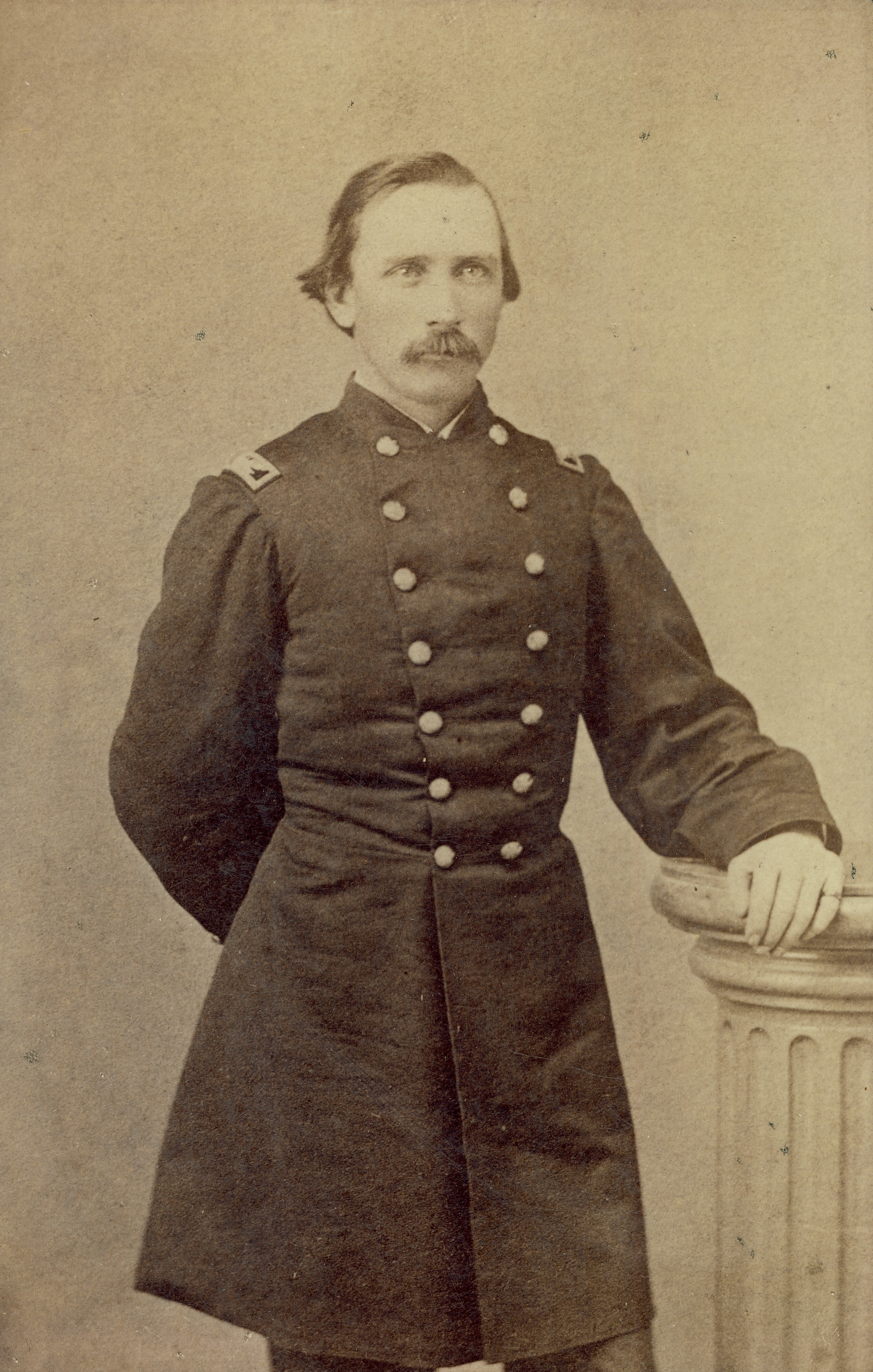
- Nearly full-length portrait of Phelps, circa 1861-5
- Born: John Elisha Phelps; April 6, 1839; Springfield, Missouri, U.S.
- Died: September 17, 1921 (aged 81); Pasadena, California, U.S.
- Military career
- Allegiance: United States
- Branch: Union Army
- Rank: Brigadier General
- Commands: 2nd Arkansas Cavalry Regiment (Union); Brigade 1 of the Cavalry Corp; Brigade 2 of the Cavalry Corp
- Conflicts: American Civil War: Battle of Pea Ridge

John Elisha Phelps (April 6, 1839 - September 17, 1921) was a Union Army officer during the American Civil War.

John Elisha Phelps was born at Springfield, Missouri on April 6, 1839. He was a grocer and cattle trader before the Civil War.

Phelps started his military career as a secret agent for Nathaniel Lyon. On June 11, 1862 when he was appointed a second lieutenant in the 3rd U.S. Cavalry Regiment, a unit of the Regular Army (United States). He was wounded in the leg at the Battle of Pea Ridge.

Phelps was an aide-de-camp on the staff of Brigadier General Eugene Asa Carr from September 1862 to April 1864. He was promoted to first lieutenant in the regular army on October 1, 1863. In late 1862, while recovering from malaria, he organized the 2nd Arkansas Cavalry Regiment (Union). He was appointed colonel of the 2nd Arkansas Cavalry (Union) on March 18, 1864. Phelps served as commander of Brigade 1 of the Cavalry Corps of the Military Division of West Mississippi from April 1865 to June 17, 1865; commander of Brigade 2 of the Cavalry Corps of the Military District of West Mississippi from June 17, 1865 to July 14, 1865 and of the Cavalry Division of the Military District of West Mississippi from July 14, 1865 until he was mustered out of the volunteer service.

Phelps was mustered out of the volunteers on August 20, 1865 and resigned his commission in the regular army on September 28, 1865. He received brevet appointments of captain, for the Missouri Campaign, major and colonel in the regular army to rank from March 13, 1865.

On January 13, 1866, President Andrew Johnson nominated Phelps for appointment to the grade of brevet brigadier general of volunteers, to rank from March 13, 1865, and the United States Senate confirmed the appointment on March 12, 1866.

After the war, Phelps became a farmer and a miner. He later moved to Tacoma, Washington. John Elisha Phelps died at Pasadena, California on September 17, 1921. He was buried in the Los Angeles National Cemetery with a military marker that reads the surname of "Phels". He has a cenotaph marker in Hazelwood Cemetery, Springfield, Missouri.

== See also ==
- List of American Civil War brevet generals (Union)
