= Lake Phelps =

American natural lake in North Carolina

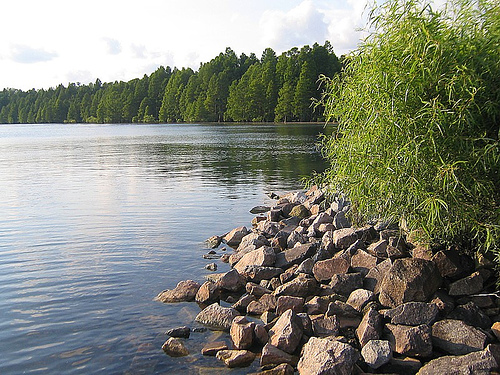

- Location within North Carolina Location within the United States
- Location: Washington / Tyrrell counties, North Carolina
- Coordinates: 35°46′12″N 76°27′29″W
- Primary inflows: precipitation
- Basin countries: United States
- Managing agency: North Carolina Division of Parks and Recreation
- Designation: State Lake
- Surface area: 16,600 acres (67 km^{2})
- Average depth: 4.5 ft (1.4 m)
- Max. depth: 9 ft (2.7 m)
- Surface elevation: 9.8 ft (3 m)

Lake Phelps is North Carolina's second largest natural lake. It has a surface area of 16,600 acres (67 km^{2}), and is located primarily in Washington County on the Albemarle-Pamlico Peninsula between the Albemarle Sound and the Pamlico Sound. The easternmost part of the lake extends into Tyrrell County.

== Geology ==
The lake has a rounded shape, and is considered to be one of many features of the Atlantic Coastal Plain that are called Carolina Bays. Recent work by the U.S. Geological Survey has interpreted the Carolina Bays as relict thermokarst lakes that formed several thousand years ago when the climate was colder, drier, and windier. Thermokarst lakes develop by thawing of frozen ground (permafrost) and by subsequent modification by wind and water. This suggests that permafrost once extended as far south as the Carolina Bays during the last ice age and (or) previous ice ages.

== Human history ==
An Indian dugout canoe was found in the lake dating back nearly 4,400 years. Other artifacts have been found around the area dating as early as 8,000 B.C.

The lake was once named "Scuppernong", an Algonquian word which means "the place where magnolias grow". Scuppernong grapes once grew abundantly on the lake's shores, which is the source of their name.

Lake Phelps is named for Josiah Phelps, the first white man to enter its waters. Phelps and another colonial explorer, Benjamin Tarkington, were searching through what was then known as the Great Eastern Dismal or Great Alligator Dismal in 1755. Phelps and Tarkington were part of a group of hunters who entered the swamps in search of game and farmland. The group had become discouraged and were about to leave when Tarkington scaled one of the many trees and spotted the lake a short distance away. Phelps went ahead and ran into the water. As the first in the water he was given the honor of naming the lake.

The lake was established as a North Carolina State Lake in 1929, and it is managed by the adjacent Pettigrew State Park.

== Ecology ==
Lake Phelps is home to many unusual plants and animals.

== See also ==
- Pettigrew State Park
