= William Phelps (colonist) =

Puritan colonist and city founder

- Born: c.1593 Crewkerne, Somerset, England
- Died: July 14, 1672 (aged 78); Windsor, Connecticut, British America
- Occupations: landowner, magistrate
- Known for: Founder of Dorchester, Massachusetts and Windsor, Connecticut; first foreman of a Grand Jury in the New World; one of eight selected to lead first democratic town government in 1637
- Spouses: Mary (m. 1617; died 1626) Ann Dover (m. 1626)
- Children: William, Mary, Mary, Samuel, Nathanial, Joseph, Mary, Sarah, Timothy

Signature
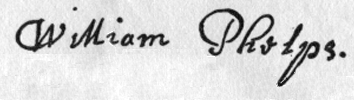

William Phelps, (c. 1593—July 14, 1672) was a Puritan who emigrated from Crewkerne, England in 1630, one of the founders of both Dorchester, Boston Massachusetts and Windsor, Connecticut, and one of eight selected to lead the first democratic town government in the American colonies in 1637. He was foreman of the first grand jury in New England, served most of his life in early colonial government, and according to noted historian Henry Reed Stiles, Phelps "was one of the most prominent and highly respected men in the colony."

== Origin of William Phelps ==
William Phelps was a Puritan Englishman who arrived in Dorchester, Massachusetts, in 1630 aboard the ship Mary and John with his wife Ann and four children. Oliver Seymour Phelps and his son-in-law, Andrew T. Servin, published The Phelps Family in America in 1899. They mistakenly concluded that William Phelps was the brother of George Phelps, who apparently arrived in Windsor, Connecticut in 1635 aboard the Recovery of London, and that both emigrated from Tewkesbury, Gloucestershire, England. Modern researchers have concluded this is incorrect.

=== From Crewkerne ===
Phelps and Servin's identification of the origin of William Phelps in Tewkesbury was based solely on an estimate of his birth date, derived from what was thought to be his age of 72 at death on July 14, 1672. Oliver Phelps located a William Phelps who was baptized in Tewkesbury on August 19, 1599, and thus identified him as the original immigrant. He also believed that George Phelps was William's brother, despite the fact that they could not locate any records for a George Phelps in Tewkesbury. Recent genetic research has shown no biological relationship between the descendants of William and George Phelps.

Additionally, the will of William Phelps' mother Dorothy in Tewkesbury, probated on May 5, 1617, mentioned a brother-in-law, Edward Phelps. His will in turn, probated on July 1, 1637, named as overseer of his estate his nephew, William Phelps, likely placing William Phelps of Tewkesbury in England and not across the Atlantic in the Massachusetts Bay.

More recent expert research has identified William Phelps of Crewkerne, Somersetshire, England as the immigrant.

=== Family ===
Coat of Arms of William Phelps

Phelps was married twice: (1) Mary (surname unknown), buried in England in 1626, and (2) Anne Dover, who accompanied him and children from both marriages to Dorchester, Massachusetts, a town later annexed by the city of Boston. The names and birthdates of the children correspond to the records later found in the American colony.

=== Marriage to Mary ===
Phelps was born in Crewkerne, England and is estimated to have married his first wife Mary sometime between 1615 and 1618, as their first child William was baptized at Crewkerne on September 9, 1618. Mary and William had four children, all baptized before 1625 at Crewkerne: William, Samuel, an unnamed infant who died young, and Nathaniel. Mary was buried at Crewkerne on August 13, 1626.

=== Marriage to Ann Dover ===
Three months after Mary's death, William married Ann Dover at Crewkerne, on November 14, 1626. They had five children in England: Cornelius, Joseph and Mary (twins), and another child named Mary. Researchers can not find further records of Cornelius or either of the twin girls named Mary, and presume they all died young. Records in the Colonies have been found for the children born in England named Joseph, Sarah, Timothy and the last Mary. After arriving in the Colonies, Ann and William had three more children: Sarah, Timothy, and a third Mary. Records in the International Genealogical Index corresponding to the children born in Somerset list the names of William Phelps' children from both wives.

=== Children and grandchildren ===
- William Phelps (c. 1593–1672),
- m. (abt. 1618) (1) Mary (surname unknown) (c. 1596-1626)
  - William Phelps (1618–1681) m. (1645) Isabel Wilson (unknown-1675)
  - Samuel Phelps (1621–1669) m. Sarah Griswold (1638-1715)
    - Samuel (1652-1741)
    - Sarah (1653-1732)
    - Timothy (1656-1714)
    - Mary Hester (1658-c. 1714)
    - William (1660-1711)
    - John (1662-1779)
    - Ephraim (1663-1697)
    - Abigail (1666-1686)
    - Josiah (1667-1669)
    - Elizabeth (1669-1719)
  - (Unknown) Phelps (c. 1623–1624)
  - Nathaniel Phelps (c. 1625–1701) m. 1650 Elizabeth Copley (1629-1712)
    - Mary (1651-1687)
    - Nathaniel (1654-1723)
    - Abigail (1655-1756)
    - William (1657-1745)
    - Thomas (1661-unk)
    - Mercy (1662-1662)
- m. (1626) (2) Ann Dover
  - Cornelius Phelps (1627–1628)
  - Joseph Phelps (c. 1628–1684) m. (1676) Mary (surname unknown) (unknown-1682)
  - Mary Phelps (1628-1628)
  - Sarah Phelps (c. 1623–1959) m. (1658) William Wade
  - Timothy Phelps (1639-1719) m. (1661) Mary Griswold (1644-1715) (sister of Sarah Griswold)
    - Timothy (1663-1768)
    - Joseph (1666-1716)
    - William (1668-1733)
    - Cornelius (1671-1741)
    - Mary (1673-1690)
    - Samuel (1675-1741)
    - Nathaniel (1677-1746)
    - Sarah (1679-unk.)
    - Abigail (1682-1708)
    - Hannah (1684-1747)
    - Ann (1686-1767)
    - Martha (1688-unk.)
  - Mary Phelps (1644-1725) m. (1663) Thomas Barber Jr. (1644-1713)
    - John (1664-1711)
    - Mary (1666-unk.)
    - Sarah (1669-unk.)
    - Joana (1670-unk.)
    - Annie (1671-1722)
    - Thomas (1672-1714)
    - Samuel (1673-1725)

== Immigration to New England ==
King Charles I of England had succeeded his father King James I of England in 1625, and continued his father's strong opposition to the Puritan movement, who opposed many of the Anglican Church's doctrines as retaining too much of its Roman Catholic roots. After the Puritans assumed control of Parliament, they began to pose a serious threat to the King's authority. In January 1629, in a move to neutralize his opponents, Charles dissolved Parliament entirely. The religious and political climate became so difficult for Puritans that many began to make arrangements to leave the country.

William Phelps was among them. Phelps had been a member of Reverend John Warham's church. Warham had been a minister since 1614, but was relieved of his ministerial duties in 1627 because of his "strong Puritan leanings." The group Phelps joined was organized by the Reverend John White, Vicar of Dorchester, England. White is generally regarded as the sponsor of the earliest Massachusetts settlement after Plymouth. At his urging, nearly 150 individuals gathered from the English West Country counties of Dorset, Somerset, Devon and Cornwall. While many historians assumed that the emigrants were motivated by religious persecution like others in the Winthrop Fleet, the West Country was free from it.

Unlike many who fled England for Canada, Ireland, and the Caribbean during this time, the Puritans who migrated to the New World were on the whole better educated, emigrated with their entire family, and tended to leave relatively prosperous lives to establish a new society of pious family values. While the Pilgrims were non-conformists or separatists, the Puritans were reformers. They were not leaving England for economic reasons or for religious freedom, per se, because they believed their faith to be the only true religion. They disrespected all other faiths, especially Quakers.

The emigrants were organized by Rev. White on March 19, 1630, as the West Country Company at New Hospital, Plymouth, England, the day before leaving England. Although very few knew one another, they agreed to emigrate as a body to Massachusetts, where White had sent other groups over the prior six years. White has been called "the father of the Massachusetts Colony," despite remaining in England his entire life, because of his influence in establishing this settlement. From their first arrival aboard the Mayflower in 1620, until 1629, only about 300 Puritans had survived in New England, scattered in small and isolated settlements.

The group fasted, prayed and prepared themselves for their perilous long voyage. White preached sermons in the morning and afternoon; then, with his blessing, the group departed on March 20 for the New World aboard the Mary and John.

== Arrival in the New World ==
The Mary and John made a good passage and arrived at Nantasket (later Hull) on May 30, 1630, without casualty. They quickly found pasture for their cattle at Mattapan. They made their settlement inland, about 6 miles (9.7 km) to the west on the edge of the bay, and named it Dorchester, honoring Reverend John White of Dorchester, England. Under the oversight of the Massachusetts Bay Colony headed by Governor John Winthrop, the village became the first permanent settlement in present-day Suffolk County.

The arrival of 140 passengers in New England significantly increased the local population. Along with William Phelps was Roger Ludlowe, John Mason, Samuel Maverick, Nicholas Upsall, Henry Wolcott and other men who would become prominent in the founding of a new nation. The passengers are generally known as the Dorchester Company, referring to the place they selected for their settlement. They remained together as a distinct body and contemporary records identify most of them.

Their ship arrived in Massachusetts only 10 days before the first ships of the Winthrop Fleet. While the passenger lists for this voyage are not well documented, researchers from the Mary and John Clearing House concluded that it is highly likely that William Phelps, his wife Ann Dover, and their sons William, Samuel, Nathanial and Joseph were aboard ship. These names support the conclusion that William Phelps was from Crewkerne and not Tewkesbury.

== Early colonial life ==
The Mary and John immigrants organized the town of Dorchester upon their arrival at what is now the intersection of Columbia Road and Massachusetts Avenue in South Boston. The Puritan settlers landed at Columbia Point, which the Native Americans called "Mattaponnock".

First Parish Church of Dorchester as of 1896

The immigrants founded the First Parish Church of Dorchester in 1631, which exists today as the Unitarian-Universalist church on Meeting House Hill, being the oldest religious organization in present-day Boston. The first church building was a simple log cabin with a thatched roof. The settlers held their first town meeting at the church, and they set their laws in open and frequent discussion. In all of this they were inspired by the ideal of the Kingdom of God on earth and the attempt to realize this in England in the time of the Rev. John White. The church is referred to as a 'Foundation Stone of the Nation".

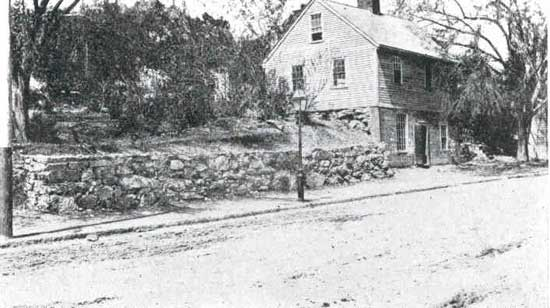
Photo of The Mather School built in 1694 as of 1913. This school was replaced in 1798 when the town voted to sell the old school and build a new one of brick on Meeting House Hill

The new settlers also founded in 1639 the first elementary school in the New World supported by public money, the Mather School. The school is the oldest elementary school in America. Dorchester was annexed by the City of Boston in 1970.

=== Foreman of first grand jury ===
Phelps served continually in varying governing capacities for many years. He was a member of the first General Court held in the colony in 1636, a member of the Court of Magistrates from 1637 to 1643, and was foreman of the first Grand Jury in 1643.

=== Early service in government ===
Phelps name was spelled in the Massachusetts Colonial Records variously as Felps, Phelips and Phelps. He was made constable, assigned to serve on committees given authority to settle land and boundary disputes, and given other key responsibilities in administering the affairs of the new town, including serving on the General Court, or general meeting, at which individuals were tried for offenses including absence from church, forgery, fornication, and "bastardy."

Oct. 19th, 1630, William Phelps applied to be made freeman. Nov. 9th, 1630, he was one of a jury of twelve, empanneled for the trial of Walter Palmer, concerning the death of Austin Brotcher, found not guilty of manslaughter. Sept. 27th, 1631, he was chosen constable of Dorchester. May 9th, 1632, He was one of a committee of sixteen, chosen by the colony to see about the raising of a public stock.

Phelps remained in Dorchester until 1635 when he and a large number of other families relocated to a new site inland which they named Windsor.

== Founding of Windsor ==
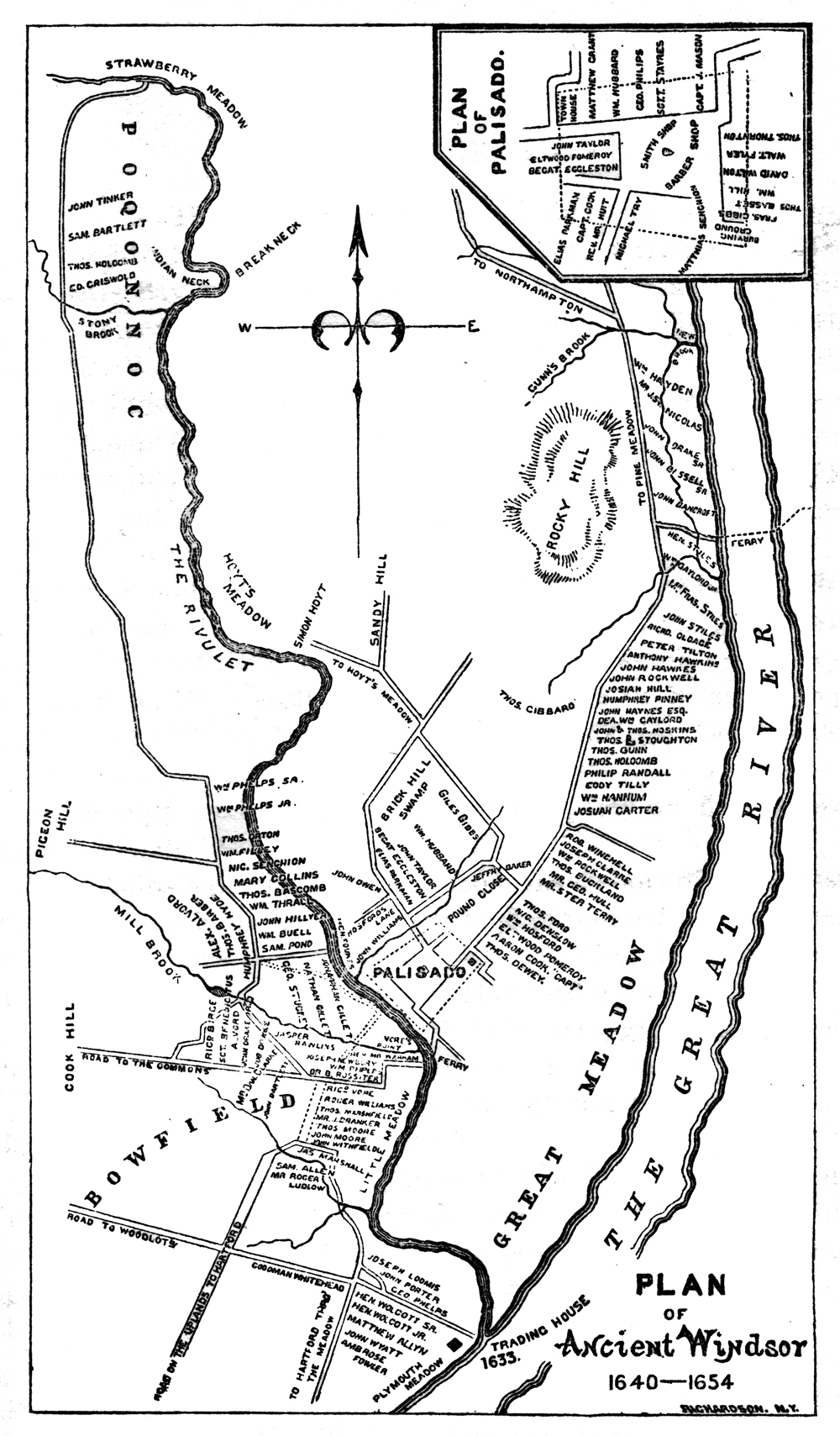
Plan of Ancient Windsor, Connecticut, circa 1640–1654, showing the names and locations of settlers' homes, the Palisade, and various geographic features

In 1633, the Plymouth Trading Company established the first Connecticut settlement, a trading post at what would become Windsor, Connecticut, in territory the Dutch claimed and in which they maintained a fort and trading post, about seven miles downriver in what was later Hartford, Connecticut.

In 1635, Puritan and Congregationalist members of Reverends Warham's and Maverick's congregation, including William Phelps, John Mason, Roger Ludlow, Henry Wolcott, and others, all prominent settlers, were dissatisfied with the rate of Anglican reforms. They disagreed with Governor Winthrop's leadership, as he thought that the settlement should be run by only a few people. They believed they should have a voice in electing their leaders.

They sought permission from the Massachusetts General Court to establish a new ecclesiastical society in the Connecticut Valley subject to their own rules and regulations. In October 1635, about 60 individuals, totaling 23 heads of households, undertook a two-week journey about 100 miles (160 km) to the east. They took a route known as the Old Connecticut Path, which took them through a region of swamps, rivers, and over small mountains. They sent most of their belongings and provisions via water and ship.

Before they were established in their new homes, winter arrived. The river quickly froze over in mid-November, and the ship carrying their provisions could not reach them. Their few supplies were soon exhausted, and they faced starvation. A few struggled back to Dorchester and the rest survived the winter with help from the original Plymouth settlers and the Native Americans. When spring arrived, the transplanted settlers moved to higher ground in the meadow north of the river and were finally able to receive their provisions.

They initially named their settlement Dorchester. Two years later in 1637, the colony's General Court changed the name of the settlement from Dorchester to Windsor, believed to be named after the town of Windsor, England, on the River Thames. The new town was the first English settlement in the state. Under pressure from continued English settlement, the Dutch abandoned their post in 1654.

=== First town government in the colonies ===
Windsor was supposed to be under the control of the Massachusetts Company. When Connecticut was set apart as a colony, the General Court of Massachusetts set the terms of the new colony's government in a commission granted by on March 3, 1636. It set out how differences were to be resolved, fines and imprisonment imposed, trading, planting, building, lots, military discipline, defense in war, and the people to be self-governed in their new town. William Phelps was one of eight commissioners appointed by the Colony of Massachusetts Bay to govern the Colony of Connecticut. All meetings were to meet in a legal and open manner. Eight men were given "full power and authority" to lead the new colony: "Roger Ludlowe, Esqr., William Pinchon, Esq., John Steele, William Swaine, Henry Smythe, William Phelpes, William Westwood & Andrew Warde."

A Commission granted to seuall Persons to govern the people att Conecticott, for the space of a year, now next coming, an Exemplificacon whereof ensueth: ... wee, in this present Court assembled, on the behalfe of o' said Members & John Winthrop, Jun', Esq. Goner appoynted by certain noble personages & men of qualitie, interested in the said ryvr web ... wee therefore thinke mee[te] & soe order that Roger Ludlowe, Esqr., William Pinchon, Esq., John Steele, William Swaine, Henry Smythe, William Phelpes, William Westwood & Andrew Warde, or the greater pte of them, shall have full power and aucthoritie to hear and determine in a judicial way, ... to make & decree such orders, for the present, that may be for the peaceable & quiett ordering the affaires of the said plantacon, bothe in tradeing, planting, building, lotts, militarie dissipline, defensiue in warr [if neede so require], as shall best conduce to the publique good of the same, & that the said Rodger Ludlow, William Pinchon, John Steele, Will- Swaine, Henry Smyth, Will- Phelpes, William Westwood, and Andrew Warner, or the greatr pte of them shall have power ... in a leagall and open manner, by way of Court to pleede in execute[ing] the power and authoritu ... and if soe be ther may be a mutuall, and settled govunt- condecended unto, by and with the good likeing and consent of the said noble psonages, or their agent, the inhabitants and the commomwealth ... (Original spelling and punctuation preserved.)

Roger Ludlow later wrote a book on the democratic procedures of Connecticut which furnished the outline for the Constitution of the United States.

=== Pequot war service ===
The Mashantucket Pequot had lived in Southeastern Connecticut for over 10,000 years. When the colonists occupied Windsor, Connecticut, they came into contact and later conflict with the Pequot who inhabited the area. The Pequot had recently conquered the area from another tribe. In 1637, the Pequot killed two British slave raiders who had been capturing Native Americans for the slave trade. The colonists demanded that the Indians who killed the slavers be turned over for punishment. The Pequot refused. Other skirmishes and confrontations ensued, including an attack on settlers working in fields near Wethersfield. This was retribution for the confiscation of land belonging to sachem Sowheag. The English, unlike the French, considered land more important than fur trade, and they enslaved or killed most of those who survived the periodic epidemics, like the smallpox epidemic among the Pequot during 1630–32. The newcomers wanted the land for themselves, and they believed God afflicted the Pequot with smallpox as a blessing to the settlers.

"At a General Court held May 1, 1637 in Hartford, Connecticut, William Phelps presiding, it was ordered that there shall be an offensive war against the Pequot Indians, in which war he served." On May 26, 1637, about 90 English militia combined forces with Indians who were also enemies of the Pequot, the Narragansetts and Mohegan. They attacked the Pequot palisade or fort at Mystic. Many of the Pequot men from that village, led by their sachem Sassacus, were largely absent from the village as they prepared another raid on Hartford, Connecticut.

The militia, commanded by Captain John Mason, surrounded the palisaded village at dawn and set it to fire, striving to kill any who escaped the flames. By their own estimate they killed 600 to 700 individuals, captured seven, and saw seven escape. most of whom where women and children. This was later referred to as the Mystic massacre. In the ensuring weeks the Pequot, already decimated by smallpox, were virtually eliminated as a tribe. The remaining individuals were enslaved by neighboring enemy tribes, sold into slavery to other colonies, or enslaved by the white settlers themselves.

=== Later public service ===
William Phelps was a member of the General Court for 23 years from 1636 to 1662. He was a member of Council in 1637. In 1641, he and later Governor Thomas Welles, of Hartford, were a committee on lying, "considered a grievous fault." That same year he served as Governor of the Windsor Colony. He was also one of the earliest Governor's Assistants and Representative from 1645 to 1657. Phelps participated in enacting laws which with others were later called the "Blue Laws of Connecticut".

The law of the day was specific regarding crimes and punishment, and Phelps was cited on numerous occasions for his responsibility in administering the law.

Lying in those days was deemed a peculiarly heinous offence. In 1641 the General Court stigmatized it as a fowl and gross sin, and Mr. Webster of Hartford and Mr. Phelps of Windsor are requested to consult with the elders of both churches, to prepare instructions against the next Court, for the punishment of the sin of lying....

In a case of bastardy tried in the colony in 1639, the Court ordered as follows: "John Edwards, Aaron Stark, and John Williams were censured for unclean practices as follows:

John Edwards and John Williams to stand upon the pillory from the ringing of the first bell to the end of the lecture—then to be whipped at the cart's tail, and to be whipped in a like manner in Windsor in eight days following. (Note: "Whipped at the cart's tail" describe the offender being tied to the back of a horse cart, sometimes naked, and paraded publicly through town while being whipped, dispensing both physical and mental punishment.)

Aaron Starks, to stand upon the pillory and be whipped as Williams, and to have the letter R burnt upon his cheek, and in regard to the wrong done to Mary Holt, to pay her parents £10 and in defect of such to the commonwealth; and it is the will of the Court that Mr. Ludlow, and Mr. Phelps see some punishment inflicted upon the girl for concealing it so long. (She was afterward whipped, and Starks was ordered to marry her.)

=== Land purchases ===
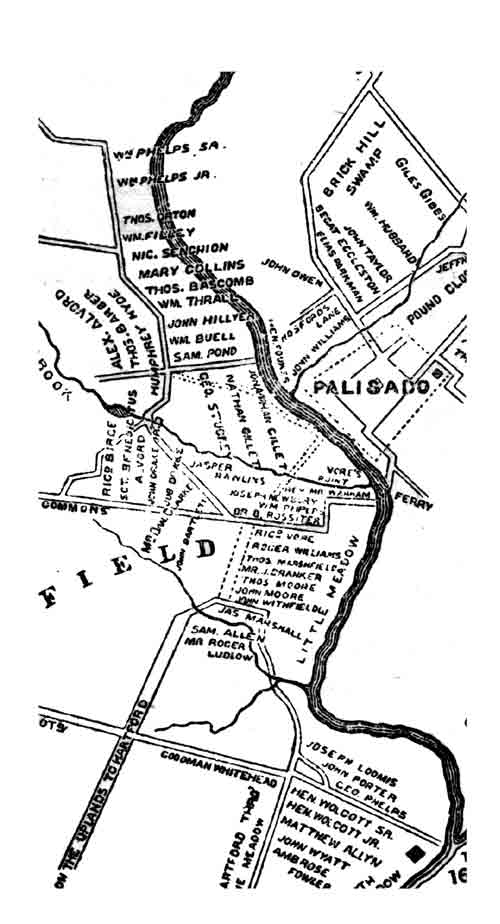
Detail of map of central area of Windsor, Connecticut, circa 1640–1654, showing homes of William Phelps Sr., at top, after his move away from the river, and his son William Phelps Jr. immediately next to his.

His home in Windsor was "a short distance north of the Mill River Valley", and after the Connecticut River flooded during the breaking up of ice in the spring of 1639, he moved his home further north, "about three-quarters of a mile northwest of Broad Street on the road to Poquonock, the place owned, in 1859, by Deacon Roger Phelps."

Phelps purchased land from the Indians on more than one occasion. In a deed dated March 31, 1665, Phelps recorded that he had purchased a parcel of land about 30 years previously from Sehat, a Paquanick sachem. He was unable to provide title and prove his previous payment, forcing him to buy the land again. He paid to Sehat's descendant "Nassahegan, an Indian sachem" and his kinsmen "four trucking coats" (Note: "Coats" refers to beaver and other skins.) and wampum. He had previously paid "two coats and 40 shillings in wampum for a third coat, and six bushels of Indian corn, and fifteen shillings in wampum for the fourth coat; and fifteen shillings in wampum is at six a penny."

The Massachusetts Colonial Records contain a report from February 1666, which reported that "whereas there are several men that have land within the limits of it (the purchase aforesaid) both meadow and up-land, besides Mr. Phelps and his sons, it was therefore concluded that each man according to his proportion of land, capable of plowing or mowing, shall pay 12 pence per acre to Mr. Phelps; and each man paying to Mr. Phelps should afterward have a clear title to their several shares of land." Historian Henry Reed Stiles noted, "In these early days the title of Mister or Mr. was only given to elderly persons of distinction, while all military titles were always used. William Phelps received this distinguished title of Mr."

Stiles further noted that William Phelps "was one of the most prominent and highly respected men in the colony. An excellent, pious, and upright man in his public and private life, and was truly a pillar in Church and State." The family historian Oliver Phelps cited William Phelps as "one of the fathers and founders of this now ocean-bound Republic."

== Death and burial ==
Phelps died at age 78 on July 14, 1672, and was buried the next day. His wife died three years later on November 27, 1675. A Settlement Deed for his son Timothy's marriage to Mary, daughter of Edward Griswold, another pioneer founder of Windsor, was dated April 22, 1660. Phelps' last will and testament was entered on the Windsor, Connecticut register, July 26, 1672, and signed by Matthew Grant, Register.

== Famous descendants of William Phelps ==
- Samuel S. Phelps (1793–1855), U.S. Senator from Vermont
  - his son Edward John Phelps (1822–1900), lawyer and diplomat
- John Jay Phelps (1810–1869), financier
  - his son William Walter Phelps, U.S. Representative from New Jersey and diplomat
- Abel Mix Phelps (1851–1902), surgeon and President of the Medical Society of the State of New York
- Michael Phelps (1985- ), American swimmer

== See also ==
- Descendants of the Founders of Ancient Windsor
