= Agabetes acuductus =

Scientific classification
- Domain: Eukaryota
- Kingdom: Animalia
- Phylum: Arthropoda
- Class: Insecta
- Order: Coleoptera
- Suborder: Adephaga
- Family: Dytiscidae
- Subfamily: Laccophilinae
- Genus: Agabetes
- Species: A. acuductus

Binomial name
- Agabetes acuductus (Harris 1828)

Synonyms
- Colymbetes acuductus Harris, 1825

Species of beetle

Agabetes acuductus is a species of predaceous diving beetle found in the United States and Canada. Its habitat includes wooded wetlands, in the leaf litter of shaded pools, and cattail ponds.
