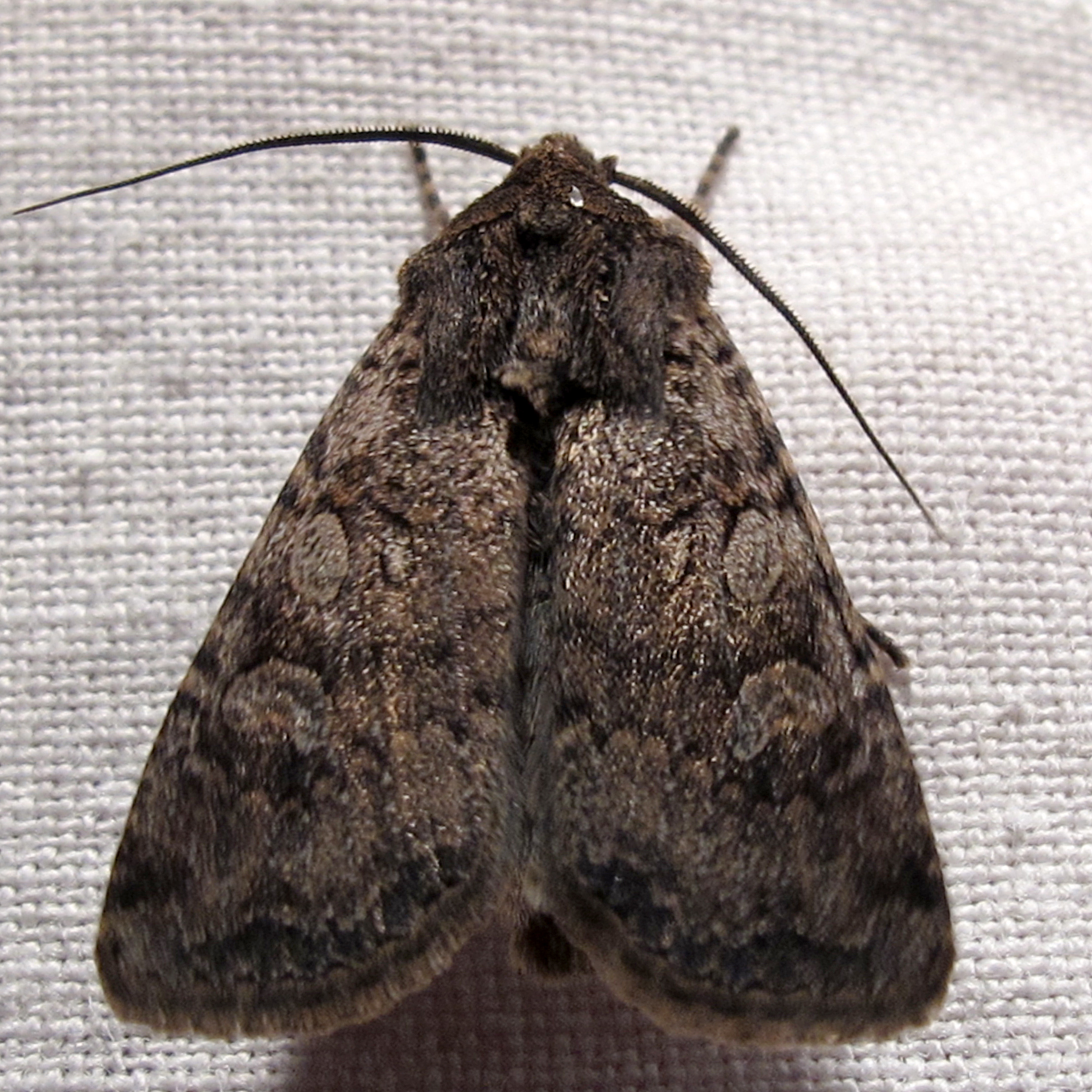

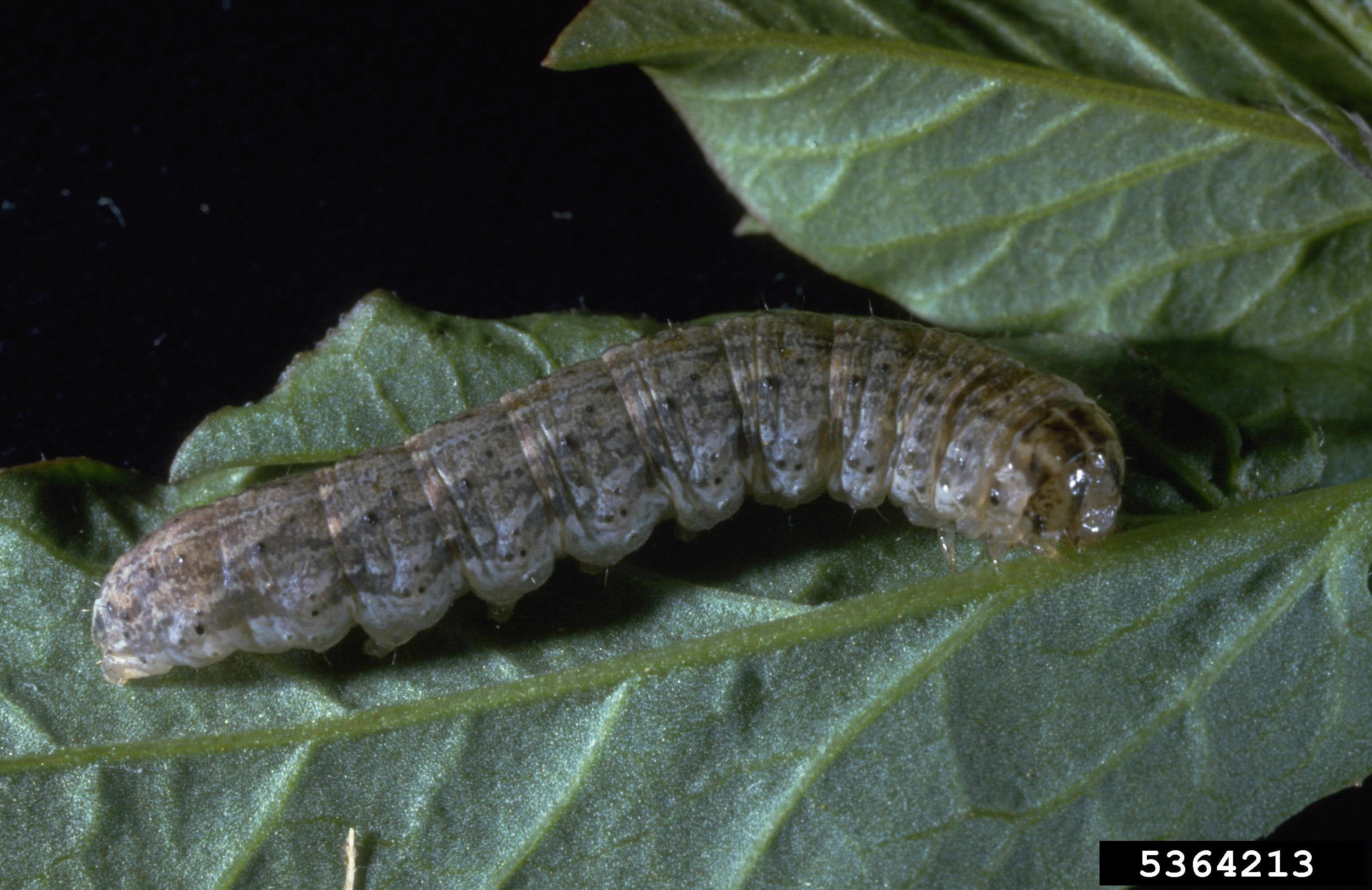
- Adult (top) and larva (bottom)

Scientific classification
- Domain: Eukaryota
- Kingdom: Animalia
- Phylum: Arthropoda
- Class: Insecta
- Order: Lepidoptera
- Superfamily: Noctuoidea
- Family: Noctuidae
- Genus: Euxoa
- Species: E. messoria

Binomial name
- Euxoa messoria (Harris, 1841)

Synonyms
- List: Agrotis messoria Harris, 1841; Agrotis spissa Guenée, 1852; Mamestra inextricata Walker, 1865; Mamestra indirecta Walker, 1865; Mamestra displiciens Walker, 1865; Mamestra expulsa Walker, 1865; Agrotis ordinata Walker, 1865; Agrotis reticens Walker, 1865; Agrotis cochranis Riley, 1867; Agrotis repentis Grote & Robinson, 1868; Agrotis friabilis Grote, 1875; Agrotis atrifera Grote, 1878; Carneades territorialis Smith, 1900; Carneades fulda Smith, 1900; Carneades pindar Smith, 1900; Agrotis septentrionalis inordita Barnes & Benjamin, 1926

= Euxoa messoria =

Species of moth

Euxoa messoria, the darksided cutworm or reaper dart, is a moth of the family Noctuidae. The species was first described by Thaddeus William Harris in 1841. It is found from Newfoundland west to Yukon, south to Virginia and Missouri in the east and New Mexico, Arizona and California in the west.

The wingspan is 32–36 mm. The moth flies from July to September depending on the location. There is one generation per year.

The larvae feed on the leaves of apple, cultivated vegetables and flowers, as well as various other plants.
