= Sherwood Bonner =

American writer (1849–1883)

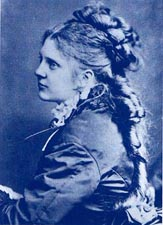
Sherwood Bonner

Katherine Sherwood Bonner McDowell (February 26, 1849 – July 22, 1883), known by her pen name Sherwood Bonner, was an American author and feminist activist during the Gilded Age.

== Early life ==
Bonner was born in Holly Springs, Mississippi, on February 26, 1849. Her father, an Irish immigrant, married the daughter of a wealthy plantation family during the antebellum period. However, the Bonner family's home was occupied by Union soldiers during the American Civil War.

According to Bonner's scrapbook, her first story, "Laura Capello: A Leaf from A Traveller’s Note Book", was published in the Boston Ploughman when she was 15 years old. However, Anne Razey Gowdy's edited edition of one of Bonner's samples states that the story wasn't published until 1869, shortly before Bonner turned 20.

At age 21, Bonner married Edward McDowell on February 14, 1871. Following their marriage, Bonner relocated with her new husband to Texas, and she gave birth to a daughter, Lilian, on December 10. McDowell, however, was unable to support his wife financially, and Bonner moved back to Holly Springs with her daughter. In September of 1873, Bonner left her daughter in her mother-in-law's care and took a train to Boston, calling upon her acquaintance Nahum Capen to help her enroll in a local school.

== Literary career ==
Capen employed her as his secretary while he worked on the History of Democracy. She then began working as a secretary to Henry Wadsworth Longfellow. Under Capen and Longfellow's sponsorship, Bonner began publishing stories in Harper’s Young People, The Atlantic Monthly, and The Youth’s Companion. Longfellow became Bonner's lifelong patron.

Bonner was Longfellow's editorial assistant on Poems of Places. In 1876, Bonner toured England and Europe with novelist Louise Chandler Moulton and wrote travel articles published in the Boston Times and the Memphis Avalanche. With Longfellow's support, Bonner published her only novel, Like unto Like, in 1878.

=== Literary styles ===
Bonner was known for her articles that discussed local stories. Many of her stories focused on her "gran'mammy", a character based on the woman who cared for Bonner as a child. Like unto Like is Bonner's only novel and is considered to be semi-autobiographical.

== Later life ==
In 1878, Bonner's father and brother were infected with yellow fever. She returned to her hometown and removed her daughter from her family home to a safe environment before returning to nurse her father and brother. However, they eventually died from the infection.

Bonner established residency in Illinois and divorced Edward McDowell in 1881. Also in 1881, Bonner was diagnosed with advanced breast cancer and was told she had only a year to live. Bonner hid her illness from all but her closest friends. Bonner was dictating a novel until four days before she died at age 34 in Holly Springs on July 22, 1883.

== Sources ==
- McAlexander, Hubert Horton, The Prodigal Daughter: A Biography of Sherwood Bonner (Baton Rouge, Louisiana State University Press, 1981).
- Frank, William, L., Sherwood Bonner (Catherine McDowell), (Boston, Twayne Publishers, 1976).
- Frank, William, L., "Sherwood Bonner" in American National Biography Online database.
