= Abel Mix Phelps =

American surgeon

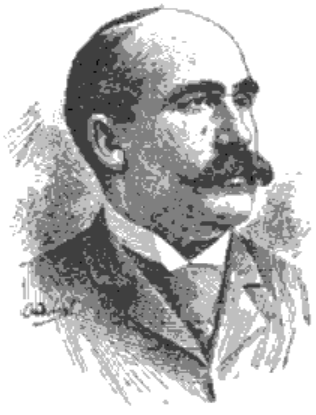
- Born: January 27, 1851; Alburgh Springs, Vermont
- Died: October 6, 1902 (aged 51)
- Occupation: Orthopedic surgeon

Coat of Arms of Able Mix Phelps

Abel Mix Phelps (1851–1902) was an American orthopedic surgeon, known for the Phelps brace, Phelps gracilis test, Phelps operation, Phelps orthosis, and Phelps splint.

Phelps, a descendant of the early New England colonist William Phelps, received his M.D. from the University of Michigan in 1873 and thereupon was appointed Surgeon to the Vermont Central Railroad. After seven years of surgical practice he went to Europe, where he studied surgery for four years under Max Schede, Friedrich von Esmarch, Richard von Volkmann, Theodor Billroth, and Karl Thiersch in Germany and Austria. Phelps was appointed in 1885 to the chair of orthopedic surgery at the University of Vermont and in 1887 to the chair of orthopedic surgery at the New York University School of Medicine. He was in 1894 President of the American Orthopaedic Association and in 1900 President of the Medical Society of the State of New York.

Upon his death he was survived by his widow and two daughters.
