= Agabetes =

Scientific classification
- Kingdom: Animalia
- Phylum: Arthropoda
- Clade: Pancrustacea
- Class: Insecta
- Order: Coleoptera
- Suborder: Adephaga
- Family: Dytiscidae
- Subfamily: Laccophilinae
- Genus: Agabetes; Crotch, 1873

Type species
- Colymbetes acuductus Harris, 1828

Genus of beetles

Agabetes is a genus of beetles in the family Dytiscidae, containing the following species:

- Agabetes acuductus (Harris, 1828)
- Agabetes svetlanae Nilsson, 1989
