= First Parish Church of Dorchester =

Church in Massachusetts, United States

First Parish Dorchester
- First Parish Church of Dorchester
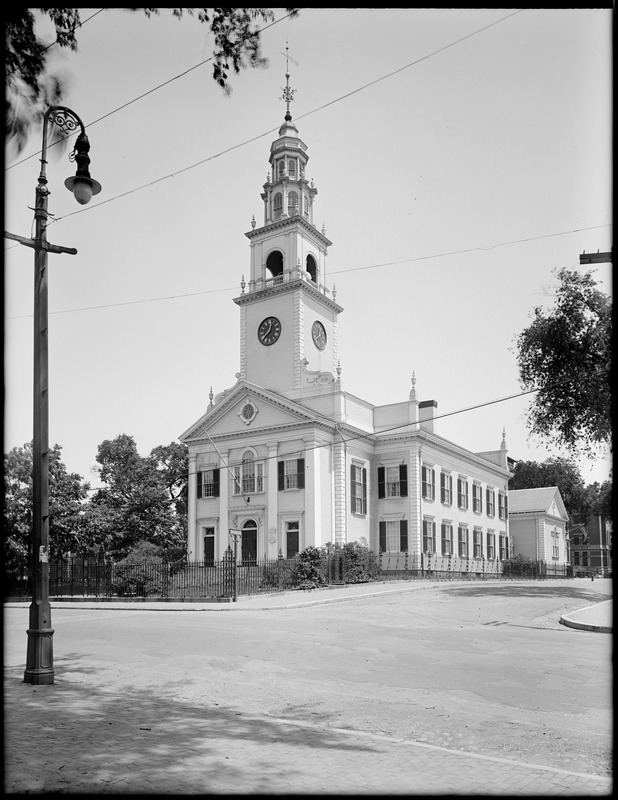
- First Parish Dorchester
- 42.3081°N 71.0620°W
- Location: Meeting House Hill
- Address: 10 Parish St., Dorchester, Boston, Massachusetts
- Country: United States
- Denomination: Unitarian Universalist
- Previous denomination: Calvinist Puritan; Congregational; Unitarian
- Website: Church website

History
- Founded: 1630
- Dedicated: May 1897

Architecture
- Architect(s): Arthur Greene Everett and Samuel W. Mead
- Style: Colonial Revival
- Years built: 1897

First Parish Church (2002) with Soldier's Monument in front, (Civil War commemoration, erected on Meeting House Hill in 1867).

First Parish Church, Dorchester 1896

First Parish Dorchester is a Unitarian Universalist congregation in Dorchester, Massachusetts. It was founded by English Puritans who initially saw themselves as reformers rather than separatists, but increasingly intolerable conditions in England and at the urging of Reverend John White of Dorchester, Dorset, they emigrated to New England. On March 20, 1630 as they set sail from Plymouth, England on the Mary and John, the congregation wrote its founding church covenant. Nearly all of the 140 ship passengers originated in the West Country counties of Somerset, Dorset and Devon. In late May, the ship landed first at what became called Hull, Massachusetts, and then in June at a place called "Mattapan" by the indigenous people including the Massachusett and Wampanoag. The Puritans named their new home "Dorchester Plantation."

Over time, the congregation's theology changed from its Calvinist Puritan roots to Congregationalism, then Unitarianism around 1816. The American Unitarian Association merged with the Universalist Church of America in 1961, forming the Unitarian Universalist Association and ushering in Unitarian Universalism, a contemporary faith tradition with a long history.

The first church building was a crude log cabin thatched with grass. Beyond the church, the Puritans founded the first elementary school supported by public money in the American colonies. They held the first Town Meeting at the church, also called a Meetinghouse, which determined policy through open and frequent discussion. The congregation's fifth building burned in February 1896, and the current building was completed in 1897.

As of spring 2015, First Parish completed the third of five phases in a $7 million restoration project, which began November 2006. The most recent phase included accessibility improvements, exterior repairs and painting, steeple restoration.

== Social Justice ==
The church played a strong role as the hub of political and social life in Dorchester. The original Puritan congregation is still remembered for establishing the country's first tax-supported, free public school in 1636. In 1641, Dorcas ye blackmore, a servant to Israel Stoughton, was the first recorded African American to join a church in New England, and she taught Stoughton's Native American servants about the gospel message, and the church attempted to help Dorcas gain her freedom. The first four meetinghouses acted as Dorchester’s town hall. The fifth building, built in 1816, was the host to many social justice leaders, such as William Lloyd Garrison and Theodore Parker, because of First Parish's long-standing pastor, the Reverend Nathaniel Hall, who was dedicated to the abolitionist cause. In the 1880s, the work of First Parish’s minister, Christopher R. Eliot, and the Fields Corner Congregational Church’s minister, the Reverend T.J. Volentine, inspired First Parish members and friends to organize the Fields Corner Industrial School for local children, which evolved into Dorchester House, a multi-service health center.

Today, First Parish is an important resource for Dorchester’s Vietnamese, African-American, Caribbean, Irish, Latino, Haitian, and Cape Verdean residents. The staff collaborates with educators, health-care providers and other local groups to alleviate hunger, violence, racism, and other effects of poverty.

== Originally from First Parish Dorchester ==
In its four century history, people have come through First Parish and made an impact on their communities.

First Parish ministers and their periods of tenure:

- Rev. Elizabeth A. Carrier-Ladd (2020 – 2024)
- Rev. Terry L. Sweetser (interim, 2019 – 2020)
- Rev. Patricia Brennan (interim, 2016 – 2019)
- Rev. Arthur R. Lavoie (2005 – 2015)
- Rev. Victor H. Carpenter (interim, 2003 – 2005)
- Rev. David W. Thompson (interim, 2001 – 2002)
- Rev. Shuma Chakravarty (1998 – 2000)
- Rev. Kenneth R. Warren (interim, 1996 – 1998)
- Rev. Elizabeth Ruth Curtiss (1994 – 1996)
- Rev. David W. Thompson (1991 – 1994)
- Rev. James Kenneth Allen (1954 – 1991)
- Rev. Robert MacPherson (1951 – 1954)
- Rev. Lyman Vincent Rutledge (interim, 1950 – 1951)
- Rev. David Bruce Parker (1950)
- Rev. Robert Arthur Storer (1937 as Junior Minister; 1938 – 1950)
- Rev. Lyman Vincent Rutledge (1921 – 1927)
- Rev. Adelbert Lathrop Hudson (1921 – 1938)
- Rev. Harry Foster Burns (1918 – 1921)
- Rev. Roger S. Forbes (1908 – 1917)
- Rev. Eugene R. Shippen (1894 – 1907)
- Rev. Christopher R. Eliot (1882 – 1893)
- Rev. Samuel J. Barrows (1876 – 1880)
- Rev. Nathaniel Hall (1835 – 1875)
- Rev. Thaddeus Mason Harris (1793 – 1836)
- Rev. Moses Everett (1774 – 1793)
- Rev. Jonathan Bowman (1729 – 1773)
- Rev. John Danforth (1682 – 1730)
- Rev. Josiah Flint (1671 – 1680)
- Rev. Richard Mather (1636 – 1669)
- Rev. John Maverick (1630 – 1635)
- Rev. John Wareham (1630 – 1635)

Notable historic lay leaders include:

- Caroline S. Callendar, co-founder of the Fields Corner Industrial School (later known as Dorchester House)
- Abigail Adams Eliot, nursery school movement pioneer
- Emily A. Fifield, second woman elected to the School Committee

== Meetinghouse ==
The current building is the sixth meetinghouse erected by the congregation since 1630, and the fifth building to stand at this location on Meetinghouse Hill since 1673. It is the only example in Boston of Colonial Revival ecclesiastical architecture stylized after the traditional wooden New England meetinghouse.

When the fifth building was lost to fire in February 1896, church members decided by a vote held only 11 days after the fire that “a meeting-house be built substantially upon the lines as to the exterior as it was before.” On the dedication day of the sixth building in May 1897, the building committee’s chairman shared with the audience that “The vote determining the character of the building was, we believe, expressive of the desires, not only of our own people, but also of a great number of others, who from direct or collateral descent trace back their ancestry to the old meeting-house or one of its predecessors…It was therefore thought wise, while making a more symmetrical and harmonious whole, to preserve the better features of the old colonial type of meeting-house, thus keeping unbroken the train of ideas which came with the good ship ‘Mary & John’ [in 1630].”

Indeed, many descendants of the original Puritans still resided in Dorchester and were members of First Parish. These living representatives undoubtedly influenced the decision to replicate a traditional building exterior. However, the members did not allow themselves to be trapped by cloying nostalgia too much; they soon voted to demolish the smaller vestry that survived the fire in order to create a larger Parish hall. In 1913 they expanded the building again to install a stage to accommodate activities that would attract younger people, and ensure membership growth. The scale of the new building was intended to host large numbers of people for a variety of activities; church meeting notes regularly record concerns about serving the community needs – socially, spiritually, and economically.

The original architects were principals of the Boston architectural firm, Cabot, Everett & Mead, which designed buildings for notable people and institutions. Arthur Greene Everett and Samuel W. Mead, former draftsmen of Edward Clarke Cabot, joined as principals of the firm in 1885. Cabot is best known for his design of the Boston Athenaeum. Under Everett and Mead, after Cabot’s retirement in 1888, the firm designed a large shingle style home in Nova Scotia for Alexander Graham Bell four years before their work at First Parish. Everett was originally from Boston, though served an internship with the famous New York City architecture firm, McKim, Mead & White. Mead and Everett had connections to the Massachusetts Institute of Technology’s department of architecture, the former teaching classes there and the latter as an alumnus. Mead also had traveled and studied in Europe, as the second winner of MIT’s prestigious Rotch Traveling Scholarship. For a congregation steeped in Boston heritage, this pedigree surely mattered and their design helped the congregation succeed in the goal of creating a near-replica of the fifth building.

The few alterations that have occurred on the site were shaped by the minds of other influential Boston architects, also with MIT connections. In 1909, Mr. Everett worked with Arthur Asahel Shurtleff (later known as Shurcliff) to complete a landscape project on the site, including the design and installation of the cast-iron fence and memorial gates that stand today. Shurtleff, an MIT graduate of the Engineering department in 1894, had partnered with Frederick Law Olmsted Jr., to form the first four-year landscape architecture program in the country at Harvard University ten years before the First Parish landscape project. In 1913, architect Edwin J. Lewis Jr., provided his services to oversee changes to the Parish hall that would provide more meeting and entertainment spaces for the congregation and community. In 1907, Frank Chouteau Brown, editor of the Architectural Record and fellow Boston architect, lauded Lewis, another graduate of MIT’s school of architecture (1881), as one of the leading architects of suburban Boston. Fortunately for First Parish, he was also a member and lay leader who provided his services at a reduced rate for these projects, and donated the organ chimes in 1925. Lewis designed many of the large single-family homes in the more affluent neighborhoods of Dorchester.

The current congregation is mindful of their legacy; it signed a preservation restriction agreement with the Massachusetts Historical Commission to ensure that their investment in its preservation is secure and future alterations will respect the historic integrity without sacrificing community service.
