= Isabel Barrows =

Stenographer for US State Department and Congress

Isabel Chapin Barrows
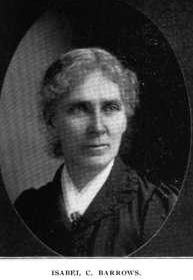
- Born: April 17, 1845; Irasburg, Vermont
- Died: October 24, 1913 (aged 68); Croton-on-Hudson, New York
- Education: Adams Academy, Derry, N.H., Woman's Medical College, New York, New York, University of Vienna, Vienna, Austria
- Occupations: Physician, ophthalmologist, congressional stenographer, college professor, missionary
- Spouses: William Wilberforce Chapin (d. 1865), Samuel June Barrows (d. 1909)
- Children: Mabel Hay Barrows (m. Henry Raymond Mussey)

(Katherine) Isabel Hayes Chapin Barrows (April 17, 1845 – October 24, 1913) was the first woman employed by the United States State Department. She worked as a stenographer for William H. Seward in 1868 while her husband, Samuel June Barrows, was ill. She later became the first woman to work for Congress as a stenographer. Barrows was also one of the first women to attend the University of Vienna to study ophthalmology, the first American woman in medical practice as an ophthalmologist, and the first woman to have a private practice in medicine in Washington, D.C.

== Early life and initial education ==
Born to Scottish immigrants, Anna Gibb and Henry Hayes on April 17, 1845, in Irasburg, Vermont, Katherine Isabel Hayes was the fifth of seven children. After receiving her primary education in Derry, New Hampshire, Isabel enrolled at the Adams Academy in Derry, originally run by Zilpah P. Grant Banister and Mary Lyon. After graduation from Adams Academy, she married William Wilberforce Chapin in Derry on September 26, 1863.

== First marriage and early missionary work ==
In 1863, when she was 18, she accompanied her husband William Chapin to India where they worked as missionaries in Ahmednuggur. William Wilberforce Chapin died in 1865 in Ahmednuggur, leaving her a widow at the age of nineteen. Although she had lost her partner and the original reason for initially traveling to India, Isabel stayed on and completed her missionary work, returning to the United States six months later.

== Second marriage ==
Starting up a life on her own, she moved to Dansville, New York, and became a bath assistant at a water-cure sanatorium. At the sanatorium she was trained in hydropathy and incidentally, met the man who was to become her second husband, Samuel June Barrows. She ended her work at the sanatorium when she became engaged and, in 1866, they both moved to New York City. On June 28, 1867, Isabel Chapin and Samuel Barrows were married in Brooklyn by Rev. Henry Ward Beecher.

== Later education and life ==
Isabel began to study shorthand in addition to her medical studies while Samuel worked as a stenographer. Soon after the move to New York City, however, they were uprooted and moved to Washington, D.C., after Samuel was offered a job as secretary for the Secretary of State William H. Seward. The next summer Samuel came down with an illness and Isabel filled in for him, making her the first woman to officially work for the State Department.

After accomplishing her first "first", while Samuel remained in Washington to continue at his position, she returned to New York City in 1869 and enrolled at the Woman's Medical College of the New York Infirmary for Women and Children, receiving her M.D. degree. She then went abroad for the second time to study ophthalmology as a specialty at the University of Vienna, becoming the first woman to enroll at the institution. Once she completed those studies, Isabel returned to Washington, D.C., and became its first woman to open a private medical practice in ophthalmology. While at Washington she also became one of the first woman professors at Howard University's School of Medicine. In addition to these two careers she continued working as a stenographer, primarily for congressional committees.

After she completing her education, following an agreement they had made previously, Samuel enrolled at Harvard Divinity School in Cambridge, Massachusetts. Isabel continued working at all of her positions in Washington, stopping only just before the birth of their first child, Mabel Hay Barrows. She then joined Samuel in Cambridge.

Shortly after her move to Cambridge, the Barrows made yet another move to Leipzig, Germany, where both Isabel and Samuel took up various studies. Isabel focused on Italian, French, and German, while Samuel took courses in music and political economy.

A year later, they returned to the United States and moved to Dorchester, Massachusetts, for Samuel to become a Unitarian pastor at Meeting House Hill. Soon after beginning his career as a pastor, Samuel became editor of the weekly Christian Register. In addition to working on her own pieces, Isabel continued to aid him in his work, helping him edit on a regular basis.

Although her life was filled with tasks helping her husband, Isabel managed to become an active member in prison reform and other various charities and religious organizations. For numerous years she acted as stenographer and as an editor for a multitude of conferences, including the National Conference of Charities and Correction and the National Prison Association. She also participated and was an editor at the Mohawk Conferences on the Negro and Native American question. These conferences gave Isabel the opportunity not only to use her skills as a stenographer, but also be a key player of reform movements of the day.

1896 brought the election of Samuel to Congress. Subsequently, he was defeated in the election for his second term. Instead of returning to prior career choices, he became the secretary of the Prison Association of New York and again the Barrows family moved, this time to Staten Island, New York. Isabel continued her work in prison reform and other activities throughout the nation, primarily delivering speeches for her cause. Even abroad she held some semblance of authority.

1900 marked a change in Isabel's life. She began writing articles and books with her husband about prison reform and the treatment of the feeble-minded. Her membership in the Women's Committee to Inspect Women's Institutions, gave her a place of authority in the debate over the prison statement. As a member of the National American Woman Suffrage Association (NAWSA), she joined NAWSA president Anna Howard Shaw and other suffragists in March 1908 to urge the U.S. Senate to move forward with the constitutional amendment for women's right to vote. Her speech before the Senate's Committee on Woman Suffrage referenced her recent visit to Finland where women already had the right to vote.

Her activism was not limited to the boundaries of the United States. In 1909 she went to Saint Petersburg, Russia, in order to petition for the release of Catherine Breshkovsky, who was being held as a Russian revolutionary. While she was overseas, Samuel died. After briefly returning to New York for the funeral, Isabel returned to Russia to continue pleading for Catherine Breshkovsky's release. Following this effort abroad she took Samuel's place at the International Prison Congress in Paris.

== Death ==
Isabel Barrows continued her work vying for reform, primarily in prisons, and on other issues, both national and international. Writing novels, newspaper articles, and speeches, her influence was enormous in both social and political scenes. Isabel died of cirrhosis on October 25, 1913, in Croton-on-Hudson, New York.

== Bibliography ==
- Balakian, Peter. The Burning Tigris: The Armenian Genocide and America's Response, 2004 p. 16.
- Barrows, Isabel Chapin. A Sunny Life: The Biography of Samuel June Barrows, 1913, Boston: Little, Brown and Company
- Hewitt, John Haskell. Williams College and Foreign Missions: Biographical Sketches of Williams College Men who Have Rendered Special Service to the Cause of Foreign Missions, 1914, p. 484.
- Lamb, Daniel Smith. Howard University Medical Department, 1900 p. 117.
- Pepper, Bryan; Wetmore, Misty. Gender Images of Congressional Life from Behind the Typewriter. Retrieved on 2007-12-19.
- Madeleine B. Stern. So Much in a Lifetime: The story of Dr. Isabel Barrows, New York: Messner (1964).
- The New York Times Mrs. Isabel C. Barrows, October 26, 1913., p. 15.
- The New York Times MARRIED, June 29, 1867., p. 5.
