= Boston Phrenological Society =

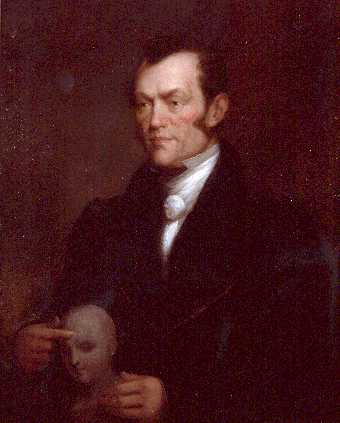
- Portrait of Spurzheim by Alvan Fisher (Harvard Medical School)
- Formation: 17 November 1832
- Founder: Nahum Capen
- Purpose: "For the purpose of investigating the principles of Phrenology, and to ascertain the bearings of the science upon the physical, moral and intellectual condition of man."
- Members: 127 (1835)
- Official language: English
- Key people: Rev. John Pierpont, William B. Fowle, J. F. Flagg MD
- Main organ: The Annals of Phrenology

The Boston Phrenological Society was formed in 1832 upon the death of a prominent continental phrenologist, Johann Gaspar Spurzheim. Spurzheim was an anatomist and a former pupil of Franz Josef Gall. Spurzheim's brief tour and death popularized phrenology in the United States outside of its controversial place in medical lecture halls, and into the sphere of social reformers and ministers. The Society's formation launched the phrenology movement in the United States. The Boston Phrenological Society was founded by phrenology adherent Nahum Capen on the day of Spurzheim's funeral, November 17, 1832.

The Society was founded, wrote Capen, "for the purpose of investigating the principles of Phrenology, and to ascertain the bearings of the science upon the physical, moral and intellectual condition of man." p 140 Its first meeting, December 31, 1832, was held on Spurzheim's birthday. (same pg) Ninety members were in attendance. Society officers included: Nahum Capen, Rev. John Pierpont, William B. Fowle, J. F. Flagg MD, John Flint MD, Jonathan Barber, J.G. Stevenson and S.G. Howe. In 1835, the society reported having 127 members. At the 1839 anniversary meeting of the Society, George Combe delivered a talk in which he described the inactivity of the society, and invited members to concentrate on the teaching of phrenology to children, to develop their sense of Christian morality through an awareness of the connection between the mind and body

== The Annals of Phrenology ==
The Boston Phrenological Society commenced publishing a quarterly journal, The Annals of Phrenology in 1833. The editor, Rev. Nahum Capen, credited Spurzheim's visit to America as the inspiration for the journal. The editors hoped to inspire the rise of American phrenologist practitioners to rival those of Europe. The articles of the Annals contained detailed rebuttals to skeptics of phrenology (494), detailing the Society's disagreement with articles in such journals as the Christian Examiner and the New England Magazine. Through cases and personal anecdotes, Society writers defended the relevance of phrenology to social welfare and mission work, and discussed its harmony with Christianity. The journal also published reprints of contemporary European phrenology literature and phrenology news.

In 1838, The Boston Phrenological Society published a monograph tribute to Spurzheim.

== The Collection of the Boston Phrenological Society ==
The Society grew its collection of busts, casts, skulls and drawings, soliciting readers through the Annals (p 528 annals). By 1835, the Society reported that it had amassed nearly 500 specimens.(511) A catalogue of the holdings of the collection was printed privately in 1835. The collection contains plaster head-casts, masks, and skulls of well-known individuals. Busts and casts of artists, politicians were presented beside those of what Warren described as "degenerates and celebrated criminals."

=== Transfer of Collection to the Warren Anatomical Museum at Harvard Medical School ===
Dr. John Collins Warren I (1778-1856) acquired ownership the Society's collection of casts and skull specimens in 1847, for the Boston Medical Society, and Harvard Medical School, at the price of $150, paid to the Society treasurer. Upon purchase of the collection, Dr. Warren wrote that he remained circumspect about phrenology, but maintained that it prefigured more sophisticated study of brain anatomy. When transferred to Warren, the collection of more than 550 specimens, including 25 skulls (p 9) was housed in the Mastodon Rooms of Harvard Medical School. Frederick Coombs, a lecturer and Society member, noted in the Annals that even after sale of the collection, members of the Boston Phrenological Society were permitted loan of the specimens for lectures to the public. Though the collection now belonged to The Boston Medical Society at Harvard, the Medical School "will not be accused of any partiality for the science [of phrenology]."

=== Home in Warren Anatomical Museum ===
==== Notable specimens ====
- Two life-casts of the head of Samuel Taylor Coleridge, taken when the poet was 38 years old and again at 54 years old
- Copy of a death mask of William Wordsworth
- Original cast of the head of Felix Mendelssohn at age 20
- Cast of Franz Joseph Gall

==== Human skulls ====
1. Spurzheim's skull, a lock of hair, his heart and brain were also part of the collection.
2. Dr. Robertson of Paris, Spurzheim's pupil and friend, willed that upon his death, his skull be prepared and placed forever beside his master's skull.

The two skulls resided in the fireproof building of the Mastodon Museum. Upon the 1880 demolition of that building, they were moved to the Administrative Building.

While not on display, the collection could be viewed by anyone who "appl[ied] to the janitor of Harvard Medical School."

== Sources ==
- An address delivered at the anniversary celebration of the birth of Spurzheim, and the organization of the Boston Phrenological Society, January 1, 1838
- A Catalogue of Phrenological Specimens
- New physiognomy, or Signs of character, as manifested through temperament and external forms and especially in "the human face divine" / by Samuel R. Wells.
- The History of Phrenology: A Chronology. John van Wyhe, PhD, History & Philosophy of Science, Cambridge University
- A descriptive catalogue of the monstrosities in the cabinet of the Boston Society for Medical Improvement (1847)
- Reminiscences of Dr. Spurzheim and George Combe : and a review of the science of phrenology, from the period of its discovery by Dr. Gall, to the time of the visit of George Combe to the United States, 1838, 1840 (1881)
- The American tour of Dr. Spurzheim. Journal of the History of Medicine and Allied Sciences, (1972), Volume 27 Issue 2, 187-205.
- The Center for the History of Medicine
- |library/m/aleph|000603207 Warren Anatomical Museum records, 1835-2010 (inclusive), 1971-1991 (bulk)
- Warren Anatomical Museum Records in Harvard Medical School Archives
- Image from mass historical
- |library/m/aleph|000603491 Papers of Nahum Capen, 1783-1885 (inclusive), 1826-1885 (bulk)
- Talking Heads: an exhibit on the phrenology collections at the Center for the History of Medicine, Countway Library
- Boston Phrenological Society. A catalogue of phrenological specimens.
- Memoir of John Collins Warren, M.D (1865) at the internet archive
- Warren, J. C. (1921). The collection of the Boston Phrenological Society -- A retrospect. New York: P.B.Hoeber, Inc.
- OCLC sources on su:Boston Phrenological Society
