= Henry F. Naphen =

American politician

Henry Francis Naphen
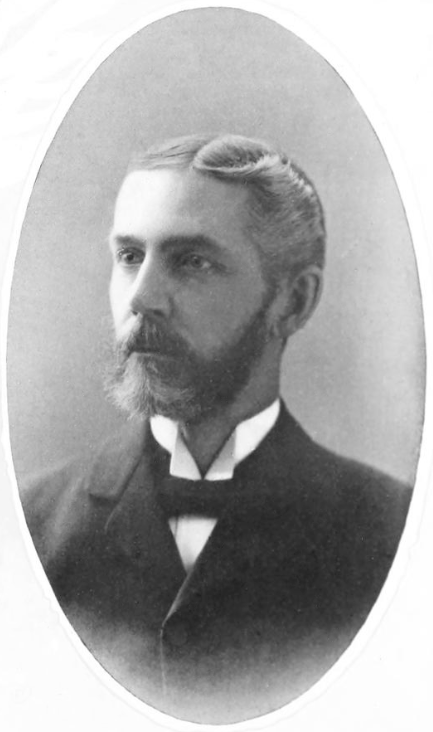

Member of the U.S. House of Representatives from Massachusetts's 10th district
- In office March 4, 1899 – March 3, 1903
- Preceded by: Samuel J. Barrows
- Succeeded by: William S. McNary

Member of the Massachusetts State Senate from the Fifth Suffolk District
- In office 1885–1886

Member of the Boston School Committee
- In office 1882 – January 1886

Personal details
- Born: August 14, 1852 Ireland
- Died: June 8, 1905 (aged 52) Boston, Massachusetts, US
- Party: Democratic
- Spouse: Margaret A. Drummey
- Education: Harvard University; Boston University School of Law
- Profession: Attorney

Henry Francis Naphen (August 14, 1852 – June 8, 1905) was a U.S. representative from Massachusetts.

Born in Ireland (then a part of the U.K.), to John and Jane (Henry) Naphen, Naphen immigrated to the United States with his parents, who settled in Lowell, Massachusetts. He was educated by private tutors and also attended the public schools. He was graduated from Harvard University in 1878. He attended the Boston University Law School. He was admitted to the bar at Suffolk County in November 1879 and commenced practice in Boston.

== Boston School Committee, Massachusetts State Senate, and other earlier work ==
He served as member of the Boston School Committee from 1882 until January 1886. While on the School Committee Naphen served on the standing committees on the Horace Mann School, Sewing, and The Normal School.

Naphen served as member of the Massachusetts State Senate in 1885 and 1886, representing the Fifth Suffolk District. Naphen was also appointed bail commissioner by the justices of the superior court.

Naphen was a member of the Ancient and Honorable Artillery Company of Massachusetts.

== United States Congress ==
Naphen was elected as a Democrat to the Fifty-sixth and Fifty-seventh Congresses (March 4, 1899 – March 3, 1903).

=== 1898 election ===
The 1898 election was a two-way race between Naphen and incumbent Republican Congressman Samuel J. Barrows, Naphen won the election garnering 17,149 votes to Barrows' total of 13,909.

=== 1902 election ===
Naphen wanted to run again in 1902 however William S. McNary, chairman of the Democratic State committee wanted the nomination and McNary forced Naphen to retire from the race. As McNary controlled the apparatus of the district's Democratic party Naphen decided to quietly drop out of the race rather than after a fight.

== Death ==
He died in Boston, June 8, 1905.

== Footnotes ==
U.S. House of Representatives
Preceded by Samuel J. Barrows	Member of the U.S. House of Representatives from Massachusetts's 10th congressional district March 4, 1899 – March 3, 1903	Succeeded by William S. McNary
