= Bela Marsh =

American publisher (1797–1869)

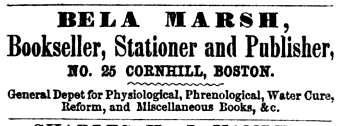
Advertisement for "Bela Marsh ... depot for physiological, phrenological, water cure, reform, and miscellaneous books, &c." 1852

Bela Marsh (1797-1869) was a publisher and bookseller in Boston, Massachusetts, in the 19th century. Authors under his imprint included Spiritualists and abolitionists such as John Stowell Adams, Adin Ballou, Warren Chase, Lysander Spooner, and Henry Clarke Wright. Marsh kept offices on Washington Street (ca.1820-1832), Cornhill (ca.1847-1852), Franklin Street (ca.1854-1856), and Bromfield Street (ca.1858-1868).

Among his business partners were Nahum Capen, Gardner P. Lyon, T.H. Webb, and George W. Williams. He belonged to the Massachusetts Charitable Mechanic Association and the Physiological Society.

Marsh was the defendant in the seminal copyright case, Folsom v. Marsh (C.C.D. Mass. 1841), for publishing a two-volume abridgment of George Washington's letters, where the Justice Joseph Story found he had infringed the copyright in the 12-volume set of the same edited by Jared Sparks.
