= Hanover Trust Company =

The Hanover Trust Company was a private American bank located in Boston, Massachusetts, that was in operation from 1916 until 1920. It was closed by the state bank commissioner due to its connection to fraudster Charles Ponzi.

== Early years ==
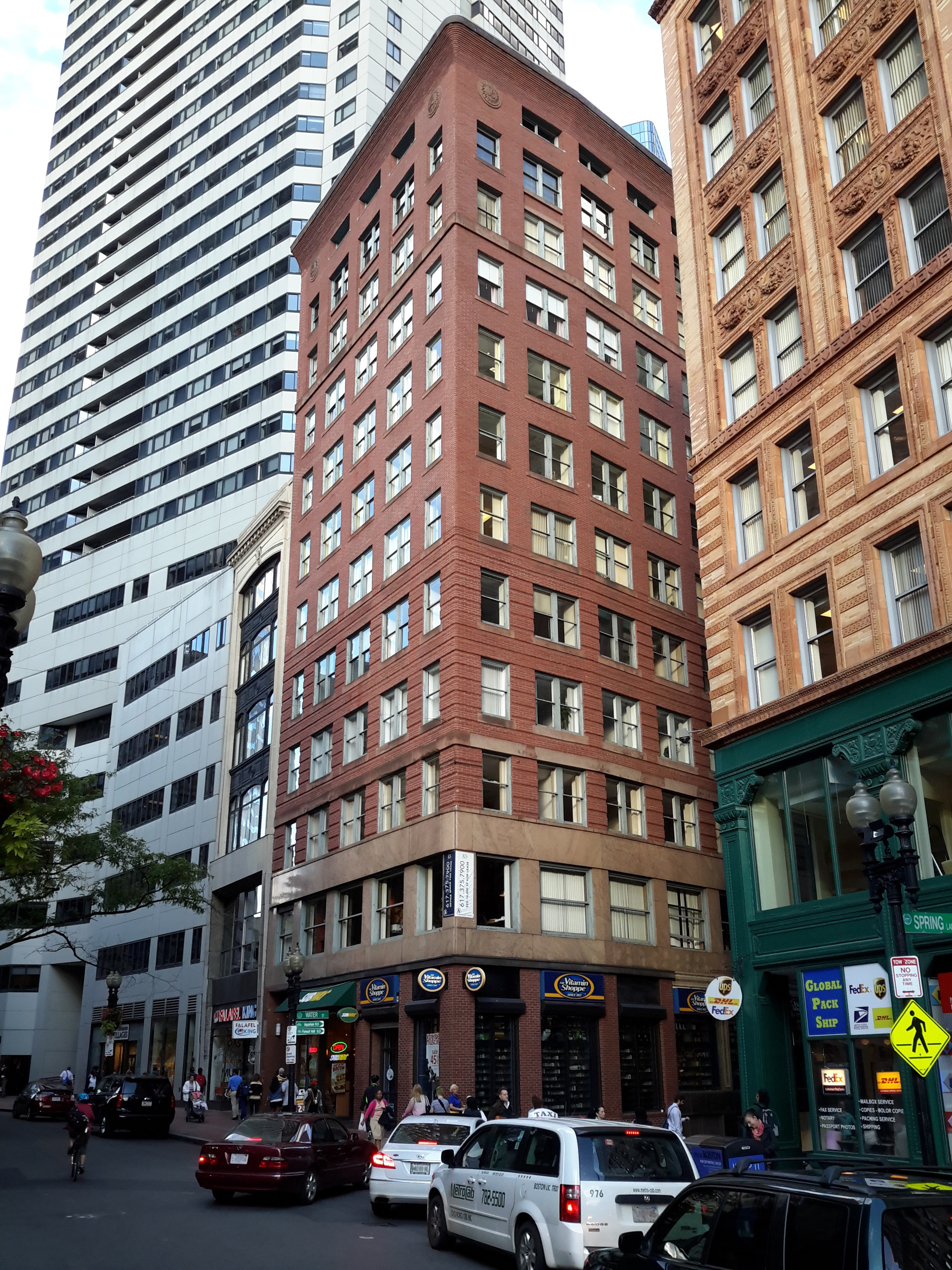
The Boston Journal Building in 2014

The Hanover Trust Company opened on May 1, 1916 in a new building on the corner of Hanover and Union Streets. The bank's first officers included Gabriel Stabile (president), William S. McNary (chairman), and Henry Chmielinski (treasurer). The bank stayed open until 11 pm on Saturdays to allow merchants to make late deposits.

In 1918, the company moved its headquarters to the first floor of the former Boston Journal Building in order to accommodate its expanded foreign exchange department. The Hanover Street location remained open as a branch of the bank. In 1919, the Hanover Trust Company expanded its space in the Journal Building and rebuilt its storefront.

Later that year, Henry Chmielinski was elevated to the presidency. At 37, he was the youngest bank president in Boston. By 1920, the bank had 8,780 depositors, many of whom were Polish immigrants who lived in South Boston.

== Ponzi and collapse ==
In 1919, the Hanover Trust Company turned down Charles Ponzi for a loan of $2,000 for his International reply coupon scheme. At its June 1919 meeting, he was introduced to the bank's officers by "leading Italians of Boston", according to McNary. He opened an account and began acquiring shares in the bank. According to McNary, Ponzi attempted to purchase a controlling interest in the bank, but was rebuffed.

On July 26, 1920, The Boston Post started a series of articles critical of Ponzi's scheme that caused a panic run on his businesses. Towards the end of the run, he began paying with checks drawn on the Hanover Trust Company. He ran up an overdraft of $441,000. On August 9, 1920, Massachusetts Bank Commissioner Joseph C. Allen ordered the bank not to honor any more checks drawn by Ponzi. Two days later, he seized control of the bank on the grounds that many of its loans were "excessive and beyond the legal limit" and of "bad or of very doubtful value". He told reporters that he feared the bank's capital was "very badly impaired and is probably wiped out completely". On September 15, 1920, the Massachusetts Governor's Council voted to drop the Hanover Trust Company from the list of state depositories.

Massachusetts Attorney General J. Weston Allen personally conducted a grand jury investigation into the Hanover Trust Company. The investigation was dropped after Allen alleged that the jury had been tampered with. McNary, Chmielinski, and Walter G. Conway, a New York clothier whose business McNary and Chmielinski was involved in, were found to be in contempt of court for sending letters to members of the special grand jury.

The liquidation of the bank's assets was overseen by the bank commissioner and Fitz-Henry Smith Jr. The Boston Journal Building was sold Charles M. Storey for $640,000. A 50% dividend was paid out to savings depositors on December 19, 1921. The remaining 50% as well as 100% of Christmas club savings were paid on September 25, 1922. Commercial depositors received 68.4%. Their first dividend was paid in June 1922 and the final dividend was paid on December 22, 1930.
