= Thaddeus Mason Harris =

Thaddeus Mason Harris FAAAS
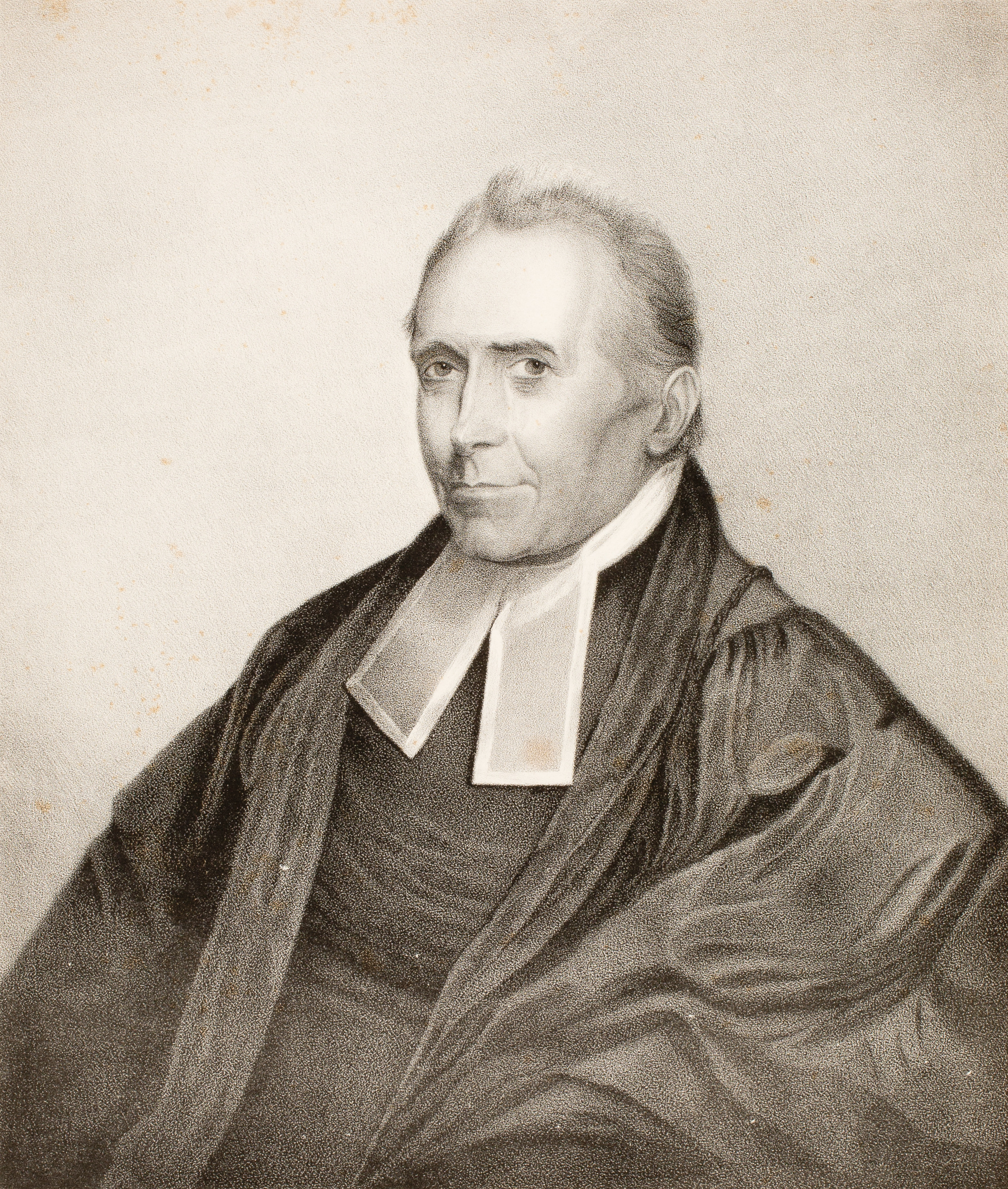
- Lithograph of Thaddeus Mason Harris, c. 1830
- Born: July 7, 1768; Charlestown, Province of Massachusetts Bay
- Died: April 3, 1842; Dorchester, Boston, Massachusetts
- Resting place: Dorchester North Burying Ground
- Education: Harvard University (1787)
- Children: Thaddeus William Harris

8th Minister of First Parish Church of Dorchester
- In office 1793–1836
- Preceded by: Rev. Moses Everett
- Succeeded by: Rev. Nathaniel Hall

Thaddeus Mason Harris (July 7, 1768 – April 3, 1842) was a Harvard librarian, Unitarian minister and author in the early 19th Century. One of his most noted books on theology was The Natural History of the Bible first published in Boston in 1793.

== Life ==
Harris was named after his maternal grandfather Thaddeus Mason, Harvard University class of 1728 and secretary to Jonathan Belcher. His father William Harris was killed fighting on the colonists' side in the American Revolutionary War. Harris was born in Charlestown, Massachusetts, but after his father's death he was sent to live on a farm in Sterling, Massachusetts. Harris went on to study at Harvard from which he graduated in 1787. After graduation from Harvard, he spent a year as a school teacher in Worcester, Massachusetts. At the end of his teaching stint in Worcester, Harris was offered an appointment as secretary to George Washington, but contracted smallpox, and his recovery time prevented him from taking the post.

He moved to Cambridge in 1789 to start his training for a theology degree at Harvard. He became the librarian of Harvard in 1791 and then was appointed the minister of the First Parish Church of Dorchester on Meeting House Hill in Dorchester, Massachusetts. In 1802 he traveled to Ohio, then part of the frontier, and later publishing a book on the journey.

He was elected a Fellow of the American Academy of Arts and Sciences in 1806. Harris was also a founding member of the American Antiquarian Society in 1812, and served as corresponding secretary from 1812–1831, and as secretary of foreign correspondence from 1831–1832. The Antiquarian Society holds original copies of a significant number of Harris's published works, as well as some manuscript items from his personal papers. He received a Doctorate of Theological Studies from Harvard in 1813.

He resigned as First Parish Church minister in 1836 and died April 3, 1842 in Dorchester. He is buried in the Dorchester North Burying Ground in Uphams Corner, Dorchester.

Harris's son Thaddeus William Harris would also serve as a librarian at Harvard and be one of the leading American naturalists in the first half of the 19th century. Thaddeus Harris was a long-standing member and frequent visitor to the Boston Athenæum private library and Nathaniel Hawthorne once claimed to have encountered his ghost there.

== Works ==
His publications include:

- Journal of a Tour into the Territory Northwest of the Alleghany Mountains (1805)
- The Natural History of the Bible (1820)
- Biographical Memorials of James Oglethorpe (1841)
