= William S. McNary =

American politician

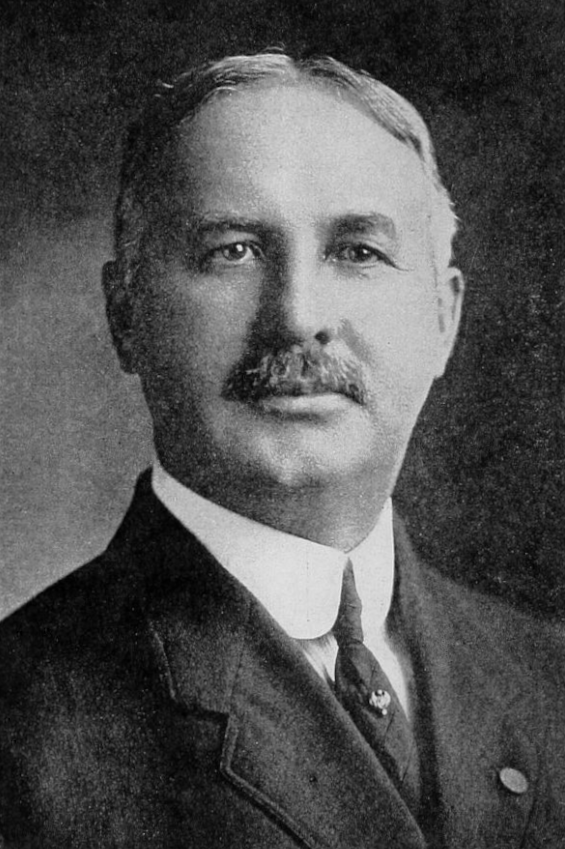

Member of the U.S. House of Representatives from Massachusetts's 10th district
- In office March 4, 1903 – March 3, 1907
- Preceded by: Henry F. Naphen
- Succeeded by: Joseph F. O'Connell

Member of the Massachusetts State Senate
- In office 1891–1892
- In office 1889–1890

Member of the Massachusetts House of Representatives from the 15th Suffolk district
- In office 1900–1902

Member of the Boston Common Council from Ward 15
- In office 1886–1887

Chairperson of the Massachusetts Democratic Party
- In office 1901–1904
- Preceded by: Christopher T. Callahan
- Succeeded by: John J. Flaherty

Personal details
- Born: March 29, 1863 Abington, Massachusetts
- Died: June 26, 1930 (aged 67) Boston, Massachusetts
- Party: Democratic
- Spouse: Albertine A. Martin
- Children: Helen McNary, William S. McNary, Jr.
- Education: Boston English High School
- Profession: Journalist, Furniture Dealer

William Sarsfield McNary (March 29, 1863 – June 26, 1930) was an American Democratic politician who served two terms as a U.S. representative from Boston, Massachusetts, and exercised tremendous influence over the Massachusetts Democratic Party.

== Early years ==
McNary was born in Abington, Massachusetts, McNary attended the public schools of Abington and graduated from the Boston English High School.

After graduation, McNary was a reporter and managing editor of The Boston Commercial Bulletin from 1880 to 1892.

McNary engaged in the insurance business and a dealt in real estate.

== Entry into politics ==
McNary served as member of the City of Boston Common Council in 1887 and 1888.

McNary served in the Massachusetts House of Representatives from 1889 to 1890 and the Massachusetts Senate from 1891 to 1892. As State Senator, McNary served as an alternative delegate to the 1892 Democratic National Convention.

In 1893, Robert Grant resigned his position on the Boston Water Board and McNary was appointed to fill the vacancy in July. He served until 1894.

=== Failed congressional runs ===
In 1892, McNary secured the Democratic nomination for Massachusetts's 10th congressional district, centered on the heavily Irish Catholic industrial neighborhoods of South Boston, Roxbury, and Dorchester.

The district was one of the most Democratic in the overwhelmingly Republican state. However, State Senator Michael McEttrick, running as an independent Democrat, won the race in a three-way contest against McNary and Republican Harrison Atwood.

In 1894, McNary again was secured the Democratic Party nomination to challenge McEttrick, but Atwood was the victor in another three-way contest.

=== Return to state politics ===
In 1898, McNary was elected secretary of the Massachusetts Democratic State Committee.

In 1900, McNary returned to the Massachusetts House of Representatives and was elected Chairman of the Massachusetts Democratic Party. McNary was elected a delegate to the 1900 and 1904 Conventions.

== U.S. Representative ==
=== Elections ===
In 1902, incumbent Irish-born Representative Henry F. Naphen hoped to run again, but McNary used his position as party chair to force Naphen into retirement. With McNary in control of the party apparatus, Naphen decided to quietly drop out of the race rather than after a fight. With the nomination secure, McNary won an easy victory over Republican William W. Towle by a plurality of 6,195 votes.

In 1904, McNary defeated Republican nominee J. B. Crawford by 6,471 votes. He retired in 1906.

In 1910, McNary challenged incumbent Democratic Congressman Joseph F. O'Connell for his old seat in Congress. However, McNary finished third in the primary, which was won by Boston City Councilor James Michael Curley.

== Later career ==
After retiring from Congress, McNary continued his business pursuits in Boston, Massachusetts. He formed The Drake and Hershey Company, a company that dealt in furniture. In 1915, McNary was one of the founders of the Hanover Trust and served as one of its directors.

In 1912, Governor Eugene Foss appointed McNary to the Massachusetts Harbor and Land Commission. McNary served as its chairman for four years. McNary was also an associate member of the Boston Port Directors for two years.

In 1916, Governor Samuel McCall appointed McNary as a member of the Waterways and Public Lands Commission.

McNary was chairman of the Hanover Trust Company from the time it was founded in 1916 until 1920, when it was closed by the state banking commissioner due to its connection with Charles Ponzi.

== Death and burial ==
McNary died in Boston on June 26, 1930, and was interred in St. Joseph's Cemetery, West Roxbury, Massachusetts.

== Bibliography ==
- A Catalogue of the City Councils of Boston, 1822–1908, Roxbury, 1846–1867, Charlestown 1847-1873 and of The Selectmen of Boston, 1634-1822 also of Various Other Town and Municipal officers, Boston, MA: City of Boston Printing Department, (1909) pp. 276–277.
- Bacon, Edwin M. (1916), The Book of Boston: Fifty Years' Recollections of the New England Metropolis, Boston, MA: Book of Boston Co., p. 193
- Bridgman, Arthur Milnor.: A Souvenir of Massachusetts Legislators (1901) pp. 180–181.
- Official Congressional Directory of William S. McNary from 1904
- Official Congressional Directory of William S. McNary from 1906
- United States Congress. "William S. McNary (id: M000584)". Biographical Directory of the United States Congress.

Party political offices
Preceded by Christopher T. Callahan	Chairman of the Massachusetts Democratic Party; 1901–1904	Succeeded by John J. Flaherty
U.S. House of Representatives
Preceded by Henry F. Naphen	Member of the U.S. House of Representatives from Massachusetts's 10th congressional district March 4, 1903 – March 3, 1907	Succeeded by Joseph F. O'Connell
