= Dorchester Pot =

Victorian artefact interpreted as ancient to support fringe theories

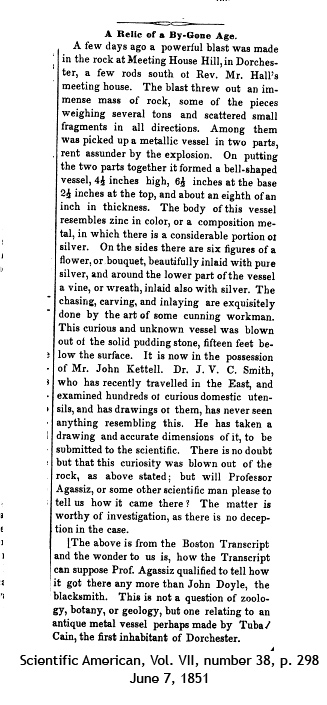
Scientific American article about Dorchester pot. Note the tongue-in-cheek reference to "Tubal Cain", who was said to be the first blacksmith (Genesis 4:19-24)

The Dorchester Pot was a metal vase-like object that was recovered in two pieces after an explosion used to break up rock at Meeting House Hill, in Dorchester, Massachusetts in 1851. According to text reprinted from the Boston Transcript, a local paper, in the June 5, 1852 Scientific American, the two pieces were found, loose among debris thrown out by the explosion. Apparently, it was inferred from the locations of the two pieces of this pot among the explosion debris that this pot had been blasted from solid puddingstone (conglomerate), which is part of the Roxbury Conglomerate, from about 10 feet below the surface of Meeting House Hill. The story has been used by creationists and fringe theorists as evidence that conventional models of geology or the length of the human presence on earth are wrong. Mainstream commentators identify it as a Victorian era candlestick or pipe holder.

== Geological context ==
The Roxbury Conglomerate, from which this pot is alleged to have come, has been dated as having accumulated between 570 and 593 million years ago and during the Ediacaran Period. It accumulated at the bottom of a deep rift basin, which was filled with marine water, within submarine fan and slope environments. Metamorphism has significantly altered the Roxbury Conglomerate to sub-greenschist facies and created within it a well-developed and closely spaced slaty cleavage that is oriented approximately perpendicular to bedding. Tectonism has also flattened, stretched, indented, and fractured the pebbles and associated matrix of the Roxbury Conglomerate to the point that it often has the appearance of flow structure.

== The pot ==
The bell-shaped vessel was described as being about 4.5 inches (11 cm) high, 6.5 inches (17 cm) in diameter at the base and 2.5 inches (6.4 cm) in diameter at the top. The body of this object was said to resemble zinc alloyed with silver in color. Its description said that "On the sides there are six figures of a flower, or bouquet, beautifully inlaid with pure silver, and around the lower part of the vessel a vine, or wreath, inlaid also with silver." The primary source of information about this object, provides neither any picture of nor age estimate for the Dorchester Pot.

== Fringe theories ==
The Dorchester Pot is often discussed as an out-of-place artifact by various popular books and articles about unsolved mysteries, alternative science, and different types of creationism. As part of a short description, an image purporting to be of the Dorchester Pot appears on page 46 of the 1985 Reader's Digest Association book Mysteries of the Unexplained. They do not provide any estimate of the age of the Dorchester Pot. The source that they credit for their photograph of the Dorchester Pot is Brad Steiger's Worlds Before Our Own.

The photograph is also used in the Falun Gong website "PureInsight", which provides without any explanation an age of 100,000 years for this artifact. Michael Cremo, a well-known Hindu creationist, claims that the Dorchester Pot is evidence for the "presence of artistic metal workers in North America over 600 million years ago." Some Young Earth creationists regard the Dorchester Pot as having been manufactured by an ancient civilization that predated the Deluge.

== Mainstream views ==
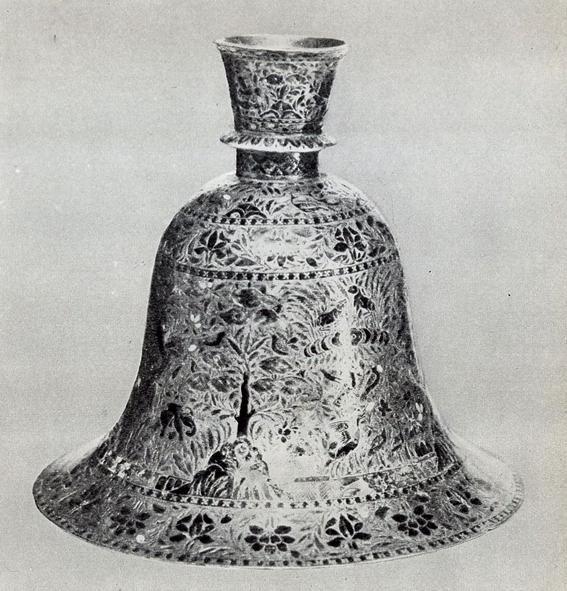
19th-century pipe holder from India, Shivaji Maharaj Vastu Sangrahalaya

Mainstream archaeologists argue that the Dorchester Pot is neither Ediacaran in age nor even from an ancient, lost civilization. They identify it as being a recognizable historic artifact.

Archaeologists Keith Fitzpatrick-Matthews and James Doeser, whose website Bad Archaeology examines fringe archaeology, state that "it is difficult to understand why anyone might take this report seriously" and also identifies the object as "clearly a candlestick of obviously Victorian style... why would anyone in 1852 believe that it was more than a few years old?"

Writing in 1964, the Italian debunker Biagio Catalano argued that the "vase" was actually almost identical, as in both shape and decorations, to an Indian pipe-holder stored at the Prince of Wales Museum (now known as Chhatrapati Shivaji Maharaj Vastu Sangrahalaya) in Bombay.
