= Joseph F. O'Connell =

American politician

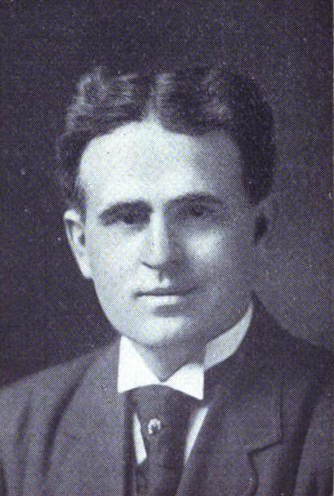
- O'Connell as U.S. Representative c. 1908

Member of the U.S. House of Representatives from Massachusetts's 10th district
- In office March 4, 1907 – March 3, 1911
- Preceded by: William S. McNary
- Succeeded by: James Michael Curley

Personal details
- Born: Joseph Francis O'Connell; December 7, 1872 Dorchester, Massachusetts
- Died: December 10, 1942 (aged 70) Boston, Massachusetts
- Party: Democratic
- Spouse: Marietta Lenahan
- Children: Joseph F. O'Connell, Jr., Lenahan O'Connell, Frederick P. O'Connell
- Education: Boston College; Harvard Law School
- Profession: Attorney
- Website: O'Connell & O'Connell

Joseph Francis O'Connell (December 7, 1872 – December 10, 1942) was an American lawyer, academic, and politician who served as a U.S. representative from Boston, Massachusetts from 1907 to 1911.

== Early life and education ==
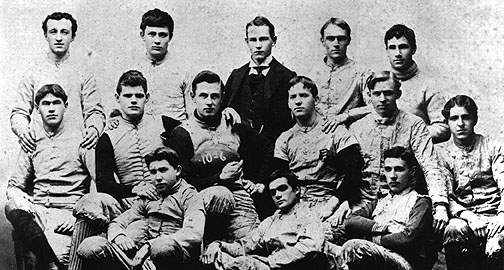
1893 Boston College football team

Born in Boston, Massachusetts, O'Connell attended the Mather School of Boston and prepared for college at St. Mary's Parochial School. He graduated from Boston College in 1893. While at Boston College, O'Connell and Joseph Drum helped create the first Boston College football team. O'Connell graduated from Harvard University Law School in 1896, was admitted to the Suffolk County bar in 1897, and commenced the practice of law in Boston.

== U.S. Representative ==
O'Connell was elected as a Democrat to the Sixtieth and Sixty-first Congresses (March 4, 1907 - March 3, 1911). In 1908, he was re-elected by just 4 votes over former Boston City Clerk J. Mitchel Galvin.

He was an unsuccessful candidate for renomination in 1910. In a three-way primary with former Representative William S. McNary and Boston City Councilor James Michael Curley, O'Connell came in second behind Curley.

== Later career ==
After his defeat in 1910, O'Connell resumed the practice of law in Boston and remained active in politics. He served as a delegate to the 1912 Democratic National Convention.

In 1914, O'Connell was appointed to the National Conference on Uniform State Laws by Governor David I. Walsh. He was re-appointed by each succeeding governor and served until his death.

In May 1917, O'Connell was elected to serve as a member of the Massachusetts Constitutional Convention, representing the 12th congressional district. The convention convened on June 6, 1917 and adjourned on August 13, 1919.

O'Connell served as a delegate to the 1920 Democratic National Convention.

In 1923, O'Connell served as member of the State commission to revise the charter of the city of Boston in 1923.

O'Connell unsuccessfully ran for United States Senate in 1930 and Mayor of Boston in 1933.

== Personal life ==
On November 23, 1910, O'Connell married Marasita Lenahan, daughter of his former Congressional colleague John T. Lenahan, at St. Mary's Church in Wilkes-Barre, Pennsylvania. The couple had 11 children.

He was Professor of Law and vice president of the board of trustees of Suffolk Law School in Boston.

== Death ==
O'Connell died in Boston on December 10, 1942, three days after his 70th birthday and was interred at St. Joseph's Cemetery in West Roxbury, Massachusetts.

U.S. House of Representatives
Preceded by William S. McNary	Member of the U.S. House of Representatives from Massachusetts's 10th congressional district March 4, 1907 – March 3, 1911	Succeeded by James Michael Curley
