= Meeting House Hill =

Neighborhood in Boston, United States

Coordinates: 42.3070426°N 71.061995°W

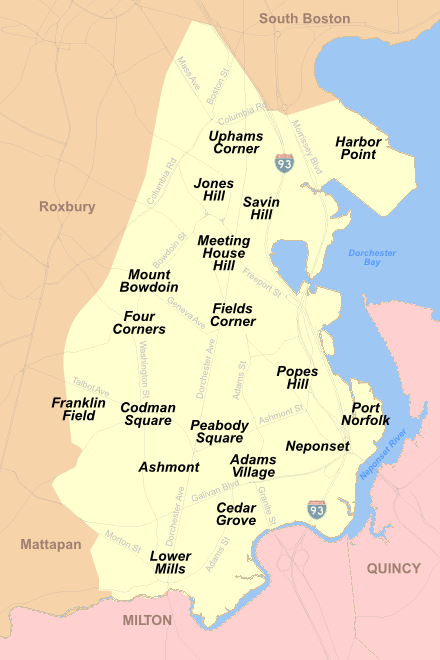
Map showing the locations of Dorchester neighborhoods, including Meeting House Hill. (Note: Harbor Point is another name for Columbia Point.)

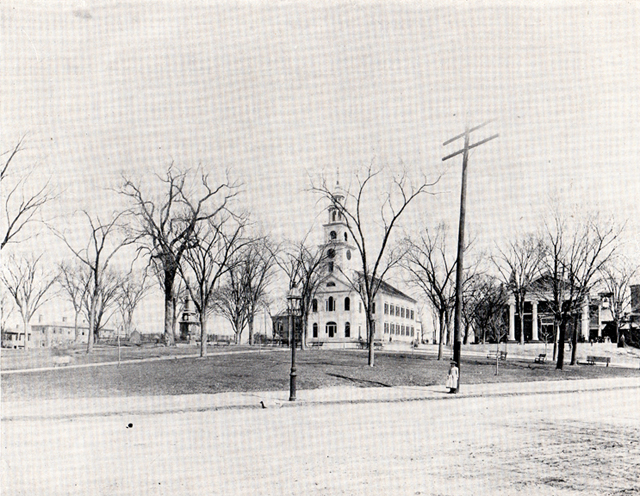
Meeting House Hill in 1895. First Parish Church, center; Lyceum Hall, right.

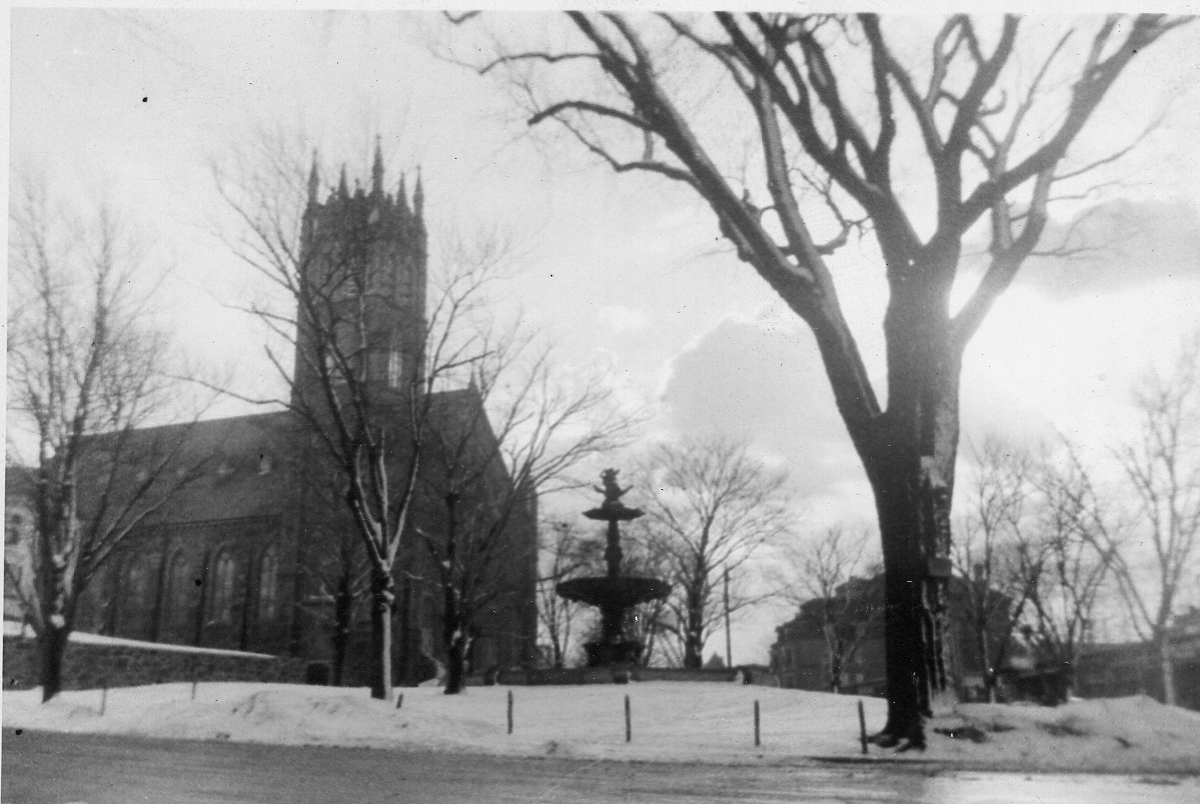
St. Peter's Church and Lyman Memorial Fountain, 1941.

Meeting House Hill is one of the oldest sections of Boston's historic Dorchester neighborhood. It is the site of the First Parish Church (est. 1631) and the Mather School (est. 1639), the oldest public elementary school in North America. Located immediately to the north of Fields Corner, it is within walking distance of the Fields Corner and Savin Hill MBTA stations.

== History ==
=== Early America ===
Meeting House Hill was settled in the 17th century by Puritans who arrived on the Mary and John. It was originally called Rocky Hill, after the puddingstone outcroppings along its eastern slope. Most of the earliest homes in Dorchester were built on Savin Hill and Allens Plain (now the intersection of Pond, Cottage, and Pleasant Streets), but by 1668 there were at least two homesteads and a schoolhouse on the lower slope of Rocky Hill. Both the First Parish Church and the Mather School, named for its pastor, were originally located on Allens Plain. In 1673, oxen were used to move the church to the top of what came to be known as Meeting House Hill. The Mather School was rebuilt near the church in 1694.

The First Parish Church has been rebuilt several times, and became a Unitarian church in the early 19th century under Reverend Thaddeus Mason Harris. The current structure was built in 1897. The church overlooks a small triangular park, originally called Dorchester Common, now named for the late pastor Reverend James K. Allen. A granite monument to Dorchester's fallen Civil War soldiers was erected there in 1867.

Coppen Square, a small green at the corner of Bowdoin and Quincy Streets, was originally named Eaton Square after Percival Eaton, whose family kept a tavern there from the time of the American Revolution to the Civil War. Wagoners assembled at the tavern on the eve of the Fortification of Dorchester Heights. Coppen/Eaton Square is also the site of the Lyman Memorial Fountain, commissioned in the 19th century by Nahum Capen in honor of Boston mayor Theodore Lyman Jr. The fate of the original fountain, which was larger and more ornate than the one that eventually replaced it, remains a mystery.

=== 19th century ===
From 1804 to 1846, Mrs. Judith Foster Saunders (b. 1772, Gloucester, Massachusetts; d. 1841, Boston) and Miss Clementina Beach (b. 1775, Bristol, England; d. 1855, Boston) ran an academy for young ladies at the corner of Adams and East Streets. They founded the school with the assistance of Saunders's cousin, the noted women's rights advocate and essayist Judith Sargent Murray. The girls were tutored in "Reading, Writing, English Grammar, Arithmetic, Plain Sewing, Embroidery, Tambour, French Language, Painting, and Geography, including the use of the Globes." The school became known for the girls' exquisite embroideries, which are included in private collections and museums including the Museum of Fine Arts Boston and the Winterthur Museum. The original building still stands at 34 Adams Street.

Lyceum Hall, next door to the First Parish Church, was an important center of the community for many years. The Greek Revival-style public meeting hall was built in 1838 and dedicated in 1840. The Lyceum hosted lectures, dances, school classes, and other public gatherings. Local women's abolition groups met there, and it served as a recruiting depot for the Union Army during the Civil War. It became a special needs school in 1891, and was demolished in 1955.

In the mid-19th century, thousands of Irish Catholics came to Boston, many settling in Dorchester. In 1872, less than 20 years after St. Gregory's Church was burned to the ground by Know-Nothing rioters, Bishop John Joseph Williams authorized the building of Saint Peter's Church on Bowdoin Street to serve the growing immigrant population. Father Peter Ronan was the parish's first pastor; he said his first mass in Lyceum Hall in October of that year. Ronan moved into a nearby cottage once occupied by "Mad Jack" Percival, one of the first commanders of the U.S.S. Constitution. The corner-stone of Saint Peter's Church was laid in 1873; it was dedicated in 1874, and finishing touches were added in 1891. Designed in the Gothic Revival style by noted church architect Patrick Keely, the church was built from puddingstone excavated from the site. It once had as many as 22,000 members. In the 1980s the steeple was found to be structurally unsound, and was removed.

Many of the buildings in the area were constructed in the 19th century. Several homes near the First Parish Church date back to the Federal Period. The brick building at the corner of Winter and Bowdoin Streets is the former site of Shepard's Bakery, built by Otis Shepard in 1820; the bakery became famous for its "'Lection cakes" sold in the Town Hall on election days, and was kept in the Shepard family until 1907. The many triple-deckers in the area date back to the late 19th and early 20th centuries, when Boston's population was rapidly expanding. The Italianate, Georgian Revival, Queen Anne, and Colonial Revival styles are also represented. The firehouse at 7 Parish Street, housing Engine 17 and Ladder 7, was established circa 1870; the current structure was built in 1928.

=== 20th century and later ===
The City of Boston acquired the Capen family estate, "Mount Ida", in 1912, and converted part of it into an 11-acre public park. Designed by the Olmsted Brothers, the sons of Frederick Law Olmsted, Ronan Park is named for Father Peter Ronan, the first pastor of Saint Peter's Church. It commands one of the best views of Boston Harbor of any vantage point in Dorchester.

Over the centuries, the demographics of Meeting House Hill have shifted. The original homogeneous English Protestant community gave way to Irish Catholics in the late 19th century, and other ethnic groups in the late 20th century. The area is now home to residents of primarily African-American, Cape Verdean, Hispanic, West Indian, and Vietnamese ancestry. A diverse selection of restaurants and markets can be found in the Bowdoin/Geneva area. To celebrate their heritage, residents hold an annual Multicultural Festival each summer in Ronan Park.

== Geography ==
The top of Meeting House Hill is the highest point in Dorchester. The Imagist poet Amy Lowell wrote a poem describing the view of the "blue bay" from Meeting House Hill, and many local artists have painted the view from its summit. The Impressionist painter Childe Hassam, who grew up on Olney Street, enthused about the area:

"Dorchester was a most beautiful and pleasant place for a boy to grow up and go to school—from Meeting House Hill and Milton Hill looking out on Dorchester Bay and Boston Harbor with the white sails and the blue water of our clear and radiant North American weather. ... if you like as fair as the isles of Greece. ... and white houses often of very simple and good architecture juxtaposed to it all. Some of the white churches were actual masterpieces of architecture, and the white church on Meeting House Hill as I look back on it was no exception. ... I as a very young boy looked at this New England church and without knowing it appreciated partly its great beauty as it stood there then against one of our radiant North American clear blue skies."

== Notable residents ==
- Isabel Barrows (1845–1913), the first American woman ophthalmologist and the first woman employed by the U.S. State Department
- Samuel J. Barrows (1845–1909), U.S. Representative and minister of the First Parish Church
- Nahum Capen (1804–1886), writer, editor, publisher; inventor of the outside letterbox collection system; owner of the "Mount Ida" estate, for which Mount Ida Road is named
- Patrick Collins (1844–1905), U.S. Representative and Mayor of Boston
- Abigail Adams Eliot (1892–1992), leading authority on early childhood education
- Margaret Foley (1875–1957), labor organizer and suffragist
- Thaddeus Mason Harris (1793–1835), Harvard librarian, author, and minister of the First Parish Church
- Thaddeus William Harris (1795–1856), Harvard librarian, entomologist, and botanist
- Childe Hassam (1859–1935), Impressionist painter
- "Mad Jack" Percival (1779–1862), naval officer and war hero; namesake of Percival Street
- Mary J. Safford (1834–1891), one of the first female gynecologists in the United States

== See also ==
- The Dorchester Pot, an archaeological artifact found on Meeting House Hill
