= Nahum Capen =

- Born: April 1, 1804; Canton, Massachusetts, U.S.
- Died: January 9, 1886 (aged 81)
- Occupations: Writer, editor, bookseller, and publisher
- Known for: Introduction of the outside letterbox collection system in the U.S. Postal Service
- Notable work: History of Democracy
- Title: Postmaster of Boston (1857–1861)

Nahum Capen (April 1, 1804, Canton, Massachusetts – January 9, 1886) was a writer, editor, bookseller and publisher in Boston.

== Biography ==
After education in his hometown, Canton, Massachusetts, he went to Boston and at age 21 went into the publishing and bookselling business as one of the three partners, along with Bela Marsh and Gardner P. Lyon, in the firm of Marsh, Capen & Lyon. In 1832 Capen met Dr. Spurzheim in Boston, became an enthusiast for phrenology and founded the Boston Phrenological Society. Capen was an editor and author as well as a publisher and frequently contributed to newspapers and magazines. He edited the Massachusetts State Record from 1847 to 1851 and was the editor-in-chief of the Annals of Phrenology.

He wrote several books, of which the most famous is perhaps the History of Democracy. He was, by appointment from President Buchanan, the Postmaster of Boston from 1857 to 1861. As Postmaster, Capen introduced the outside letterbox collection system, the first such system in the U.S. Postal Service. The Ronan Park area on Meeting House Hill was once part of Nahum Capen's estate Mount Ida.
