= Samuel J. Barrows =

American politician (1845–1909)

Samuel June Barrows
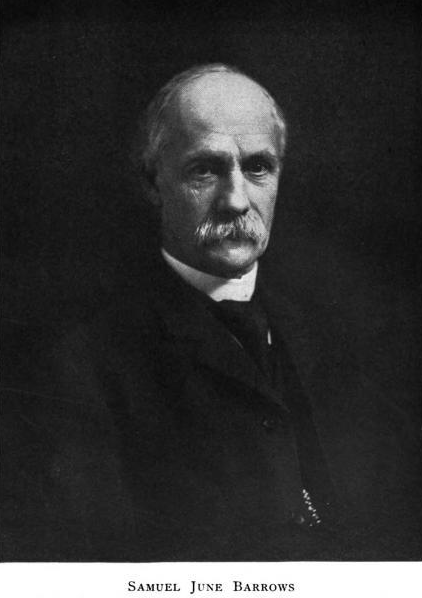

Member of the U.S. House of Representatives from Massachusetts's 10th district
- In office March 4, 1897 – March 3, 1899
- Preceded by: Harrison H. Atwood
- Succeeded by: Henry F. Naphen

Personal details
- Born: May 26, 1845 New York, New York, U.S.
- Died: April 21, 1909 (aged 63) New York, New York, U.S.
- Party: Republican
- Spouse: Katherine Isabel Hayes Chapin
- Children: Mabel Hay Barrows (m. Henry Raymond Mussey)
- Education: Harvard Divinity School, B.D. 1874

Samuel June Barrows (May 26, 1845 – April 21, 1909) was an American Republican politician who served one term as a U.S. representative from Boston, Massachusetts.

== Early life and education ==
Barrows was born in New York City to a strict Baptist family. After his father's death, Barrows was sent to school until he became ill around the age of 7 or 8. His doctor recommended that he leave school. Barrows' mother, Jane Weekes Barrow, sent him to work for a printing press owned by Richard Hoe, a cousin of Barrows' late father. He learned to be a messenger and telegrapher, as well as learning shorthand.

He tried to enlist in the United States Navy during the American Civil War but was rejected because of poor health. Barrows was then admitted to a hydropathic sanitarium for treatment and became the personal secretary of the presiding doctor.

Finding a calling to be a minister, he attended the Harvard Divinity School in 1871. While at Harvard, he was the Boston correspondent of the New York Tribune.

== Career ==
After graduating, Barrows served for four years as minister of the First Parish on Meeting House Hill in Dorchester, Massachusetts, and then was editor of the Unitarian publication The Christian Register for the next sixteen years.

He went with the Yellowstone Expedition of 1873, under the command of General Stanley, and with the Black Hills Expedition in 1874, commanded by General Custer. In 1873, he took part in the Battle of the Tongue River.

=== United States Congress ===
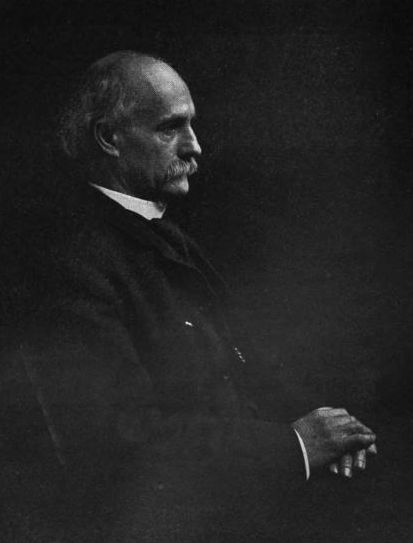
Samuel J. Barrows

Barrows was elected as a Republican to the 55th United States Congress (March 4, 1897 – March 3, 1899).

He was an advocate for women's suffrage, African American rights, assimilation of Native Americans and prison reform. On the international stage, he was an activist for ending hunger. One of his first actions in Congress was to send ships carrying grain to India to feed the starving. In his later years, he served as executive secretary of the Russian Famine Relief Commission.

Barrows promoted legislation that would remove Native Americans from reservations, believing that cultural assimilation would lead to equality. As a pacifist, he bitterly opposed the Spanish–American War.

He was an unsuccessful candidate for reelection in 1898 to the Fifty-sixth Congress.

=== New York Prison Association ===
After a failed nomination for Librarian of Congress, Barrows served as the Corresponding Secretary of the New York Prison Association from 1899 to 1909. In this role, he successfully advocated for juvenile courts, parole, probation, indeterminate sentences, and improved prison conditions. He argued forcefully against capital punishment and the fee system.

Barrows was the American representative to the International Prison Congress of 1895, 1900, and 1905, and president-elect of the 1910 congress before his death.

== Personal life ==
He met his future wife, Isabel Barrows, during his stay at the sanitarium. She was a medical student there.

During his stay at the sanitarium, Samuel picked up the nickname "June," derived from his sunny personality. He used this as his middle name for the rest of his life.

Barrows had a wide array range of interests and talents including musical composition and singing oratorios, studying the Greeks (he wrote The Isles and Shires of Greece), metal crafting, writing poetry, camping (he and his wife Isabella wrote one of the first books on the subject, The Shaybacks in Camp: Ten Summers under Canvas), travel, and foreign languages. He spoke three languages, read two, and was in the process of learning another at the time of his death.

== Death ==
Barrows died on April 21, 1909, of pneumonia, in New York City's Presbyterian Hospital. His remains were cremated and the ashes placed in a private burying ground near Georgeville, Quebec, Canada.

== Footnotes ==
U.S. House of Representatives
Preceded by Harrison H. Atwood	Member of the U.S. House of Representatives from Massachusetts's 10th congressional district March 4, 1897 – March 3, 1899	Succeeded by Henry F. Naphen
