= Max Schede =

German surgeon (1844–1902)

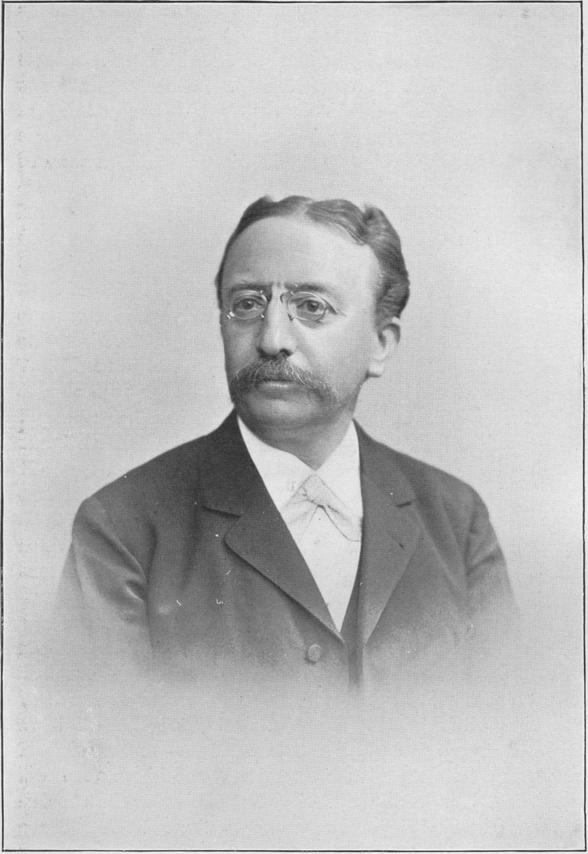
Max Schede (1844-1902)

Max Schede (7 January 1844 – 31 December 1902) was a German surgeon born in Arnsberg.

Schede studied medicine at the Universities of Halle, Heidelberg and Zurich, obtaining his medical doctorate in 1866. After serving as a doctor in the Austro-Prussian War, he became an assistant to Richard von Volkmann (1830-1889) at Halle. During the Franco-Prussian War, he was in charge of a Feldlazaretts. In 1875, he appointed head of the surgical department at Friedrichshain Hospital in Berlin, and from onward 1880, he practiced surgery at St. Georg Hospital in Hamburg.

At Hamburg he was a catalyst towards the construction of Eppendorf Hospital, becoming head of its surgical department in 1888. In 1895 he was chosen professor of surgery at the University of Bonn. Schede was a pioneer of antisepsis in Germany.

In 1890 he introduced a surgical procedure called thoracoplasty, an operation involving resection of the thorax for treatment of chronic empyema. His name is associated with the "Schede method", also known as "Schede's clot", a procedure that involves scraping off dead tissue in bone necrosis, allowing the cavity to fill with blood, then covering it with gauze and rubber.

In 1874 he was a co-founder of the journal "Zentralblatt für Chirurgie".

== Selected writings ==
- Meine Erfahrungen über Nierenexstirpationen, 1899 – On extirpation of the kidneys.
- Die angeborene Luxation des Hüftgelenkes, 1900 – Congenital dislocation of the hip.
