= The Mather School =

Coordinates: 42.308210°N 71.061250°W

Location
- 24 Parish Street; Dorchester, Massachusetts; United States

Information
- Type: Public school
- Motto: First and Finest
- Established: June 9, 1639; 387 years ago
- School district: Boston Public Schools
- Principal: Hai Son
- Assistant Principal: Nilsa Reis
- Faculty: 43
- Grades: K0–6
- Gender: Coeducational
- Enrollment: 473 (2024-2025)
- Campus: Urban
- Colors: Orange and Blue
- Mascot: Mather Bee
- Affiliation: Boston Public Schools
- Website: www.matherelementary.com

The Mather School is the oldest public elementary school in North America. It is located in the Dorchester region of Boston, Massachusetts and was named after Richard Mather. Mather was an English-born American Congregational minister who emigrated to Boston and settled in Dorchester in 1635.

On June 9 [O.S. May 20] 1639 The Dorchester Town Records reads the following:

"It is ordered that the 20th of May 1639, that there shalbe a rent paid of 20ls yeerely foreur imposed upon Tomsons Iland to bee payd p euy p'son that hat p'prtie in the said Iland according to the p'portion that any such p'son shall fro tyme to tyem injoy and posesse there, and this towards the mayntenance of a schoole in Dorchestr this rent of 20ls yeerlyl to bee payd to such a schoolemaster as shall undertake to teach english latin and other tongues and also writing...."

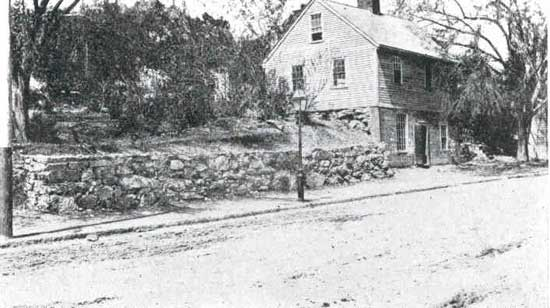
Photo of the oldest School House still standing (in 1913). In 1798 the town voted to sell the old school and build a new one of brick on Meeting House Hill.

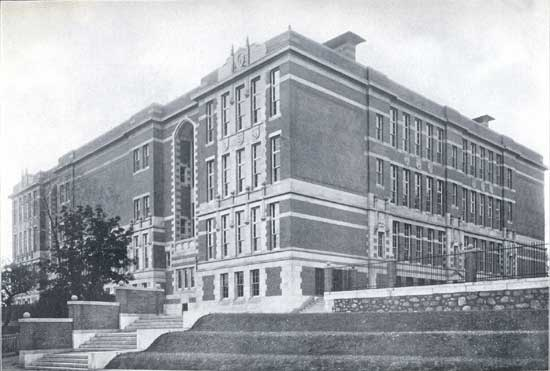
The Mather School in 1905

The first building was a one room schoolhouse and was located on what had been known as "Settlers' Street," near the corner of the present Pleasant and Cottage Streets. It served until 1694 when a contract was made with John Trescot to build a house twenty feet long and nineteen feet wide, with a ground floor, a chamber above, with a flight of stairs, and a chimney. The contract required the building to be boarded and clapboarded; to be filled up between the studs; to be fully covered with boards and shingles. The site of this building is supposed to be the hill near the meeting-house, on what is now known as Winter Street.

The successor of this first school is the Mather School located at Meeting House Hill, the second building of that name. The previous building, erected in 1856, was located on the same site where the fire station is now. It was renamed the Edward Southworth School when the new Mather School was built in 1905, and has since been demolished.

The Mather School, located on Parish Street just a few yards away from the original location, is operating for students of the Dorchester district spanning grades K–5. The school's mission is proficiency with support for all in reading, writing and math. Other classes offered are music, art, physical education, science, library and computers. Additional programs include tutoring, mentoring and nutrition education. The school has a culturally diverse student and staff body with seven specialty classes and a well equipped playground. The principal as of the 2021–22 school year is Hai Son.

== See also ==
- Boston Latin School
