= Thaddeus William Harris =

American physician (1795–1856)

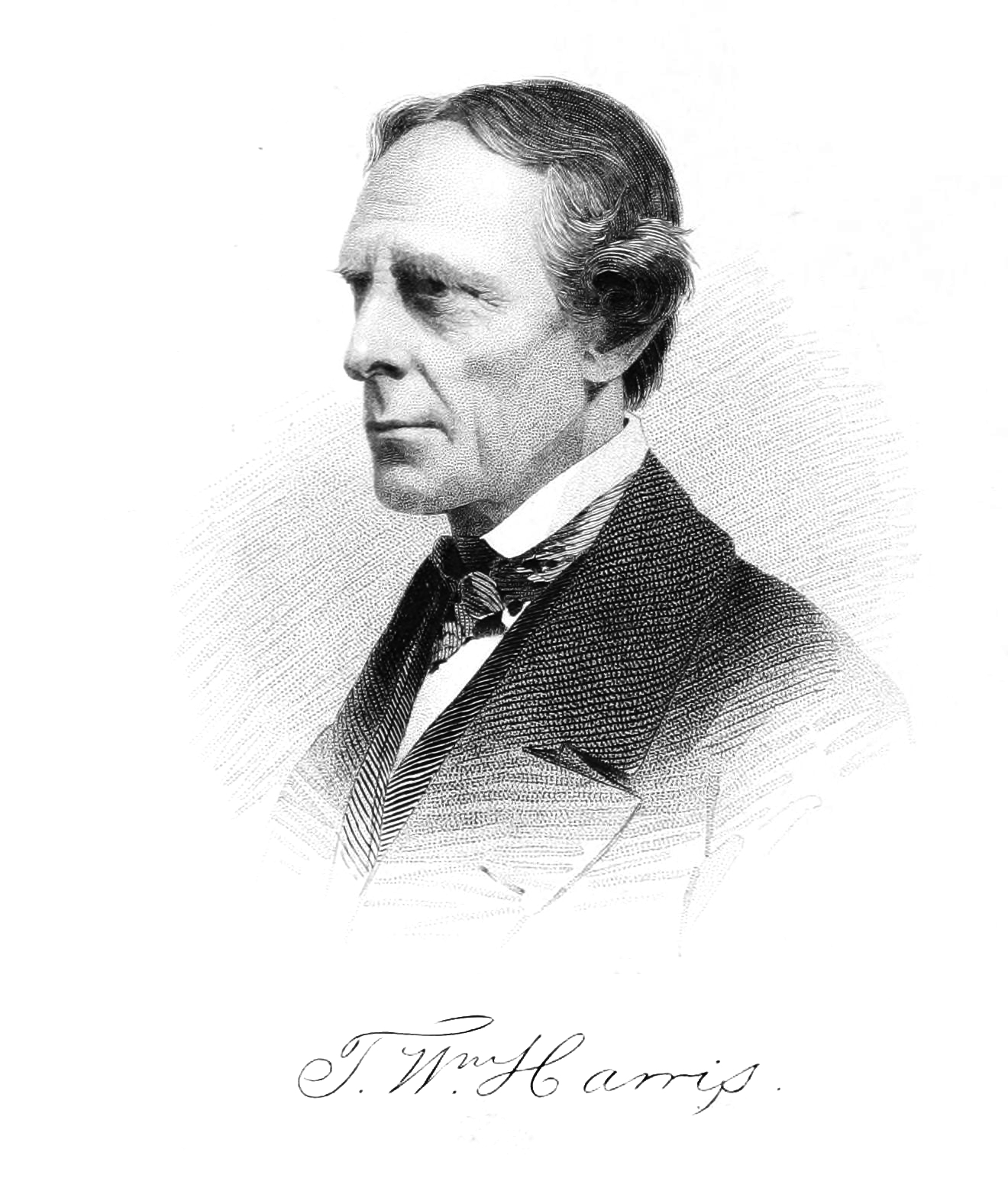
- Born: November 12, 1795; Dorchester, Boston, Massachusetts, US
- Died: January 16, 1856 (aged 60); Cambridge, Massachusetts, US
- Occupations: entomologist; botanist

Thaddeus William Harris (November 12, 1795 – January 16, 1856) was an American entomologist and librarian. His focus on insect life cycles and interactions with plants was influential in broadening American entomological studies beyond a narrow taxonomic approach. He was an early agricultural entomologist and served as a mentor and role model for others in this new field. For 25 years Harris served as the librarian of Harvard University where oversaw the rapid growth of the library and introduced one of the earliest American library card catalogs.

== Life and career ==
Thaddeus William Harris was born in Dorchester, Massachusetts on November 12, 1795. His father, Thaddeus Mason Harris, was a Unitarian minister who served at the church on Meeting House Hill and had also for a time served as librarian of Harvard. Harris himself received his undergraduate degree at Harvard in 1815, and then went on to study medicine there, receiving his M.D. in 1820. He went into medical practice with Amos Holbrook until 1831, first in Milton and then in Dorchester, Massachusetts. In 1824 he married Catherine Holbrook, a daughter of his medical partner. Thaddeus and Catherine had 12 children.

Harris became interested in entomology while still a student at Harvard where he attended the natural history lectures of William D. Peck. After graduation he spent much of his spare time studying insects. His first publication, "Upon the Natural History of the Salt-marsh Caterpillar", appeared in 1823 in the Massachusetts Agricultural Repository. His early work demonstrated a commitment to understanding the life history of insects and a focus on insects that were injurious to agriculture. By 1836 he had published thirty-three papers, mostly in agricultural or horticultural journals (especially the New England Farmer). While his published works focused on agricultural entomology, his prolific correspondence with other entomologists was more often related to insect classification and other technical aspects. In 1837 Harris was appointed by the Massachusetts Commission on the Zoological and Botanical Survey to prepare a report on the insects of Massachusetts. The results, A Treatise on Some of the Insects of New England, Which Are Injurious to Vegetation, was published in 1842. A second edition appeared in 1852, and a third, illustrated edition was issued posthumously in 1862.

In 1831 Harris became the librarian of Harvard. He replaced Benjamin Peirce who had just died in this position. Harris' study of insects was a result of his having interacted with William D. Peck while a student at Harvard. Harris lectured on various topics related to his work as a naturalist while he was Harvard librarian, and originated the Harvard Natural History Society for the students. In 1837 he was appointed one of the commissioners for a zoological and botanical survey of Massachusetts, the result of which was his Systematic Catalogue of the Insects of Massachusetts in which 2,350 species are enumerated. He sought a permanent appointment to the faculty in 1842, but the position was given to Asa Gray instead.

He was one of the founders of the Massachusetts Horticultural Society. He was elected a Fellow of the American Academy of Arts and Sciences in 1827.

== Bibliography ==
- Elliott, Clark A. (2000). "Harris, Thaddeus William". American National Biography. Oxford University Press. doi:10.1093/anb/9780198606697.article.1300704.
- Elliott, Clark A. (2008). Thaddeus William Harris (1795-1856). Bethlehem: Lehigh University Press. ISBN 978-0-934223-91-1. OCLC 141187944.
- Mallis, Arnold (1971). American Entomologists. Rutgers University Press. pp. 25–33.
- Potter, Alfred Claghorn; Bolton, Charles Knowles (1897). The Librarians of Harvard College 1667-1877. Cambridge Library of Harvard University. p. 39.
- Sorensen, W. Conner (1995). Brethren of the Net, American Entomology, 1840-1880. University of Alabama Press.
- Sterling, Keir B., ed. (1997). "Harris, Thaddeus William". Biographical Dictionary of American and Canadian Naturalists and Environmentalists. Greenwood Press.
