= National Register of Historic Places listings in Franklin County, Georgia =

This is a list of properties and districts in Franklin County, Georgia that are listed on the National Register of Historic Places (NRHP).

This National Park Service list is complete through NPS recent listings posted May 1, 2026.

== Current listings ==
	Name on the Register	Image	Date listed	Location	City or town	Description
1	Adams House		September 1, 1983 (#83000199)	Hartwell Rd. 34°25′52″N 83°05′37″W	Lavonia	
2	William Ariail House	William Ariail House	November 7, 1996 (#96001297)	GA 51, approximately .25 mi. SE of the Banks-Franklin County line 34°21′54″N 83°23′05″W	Carnesville	
3	Ayers-Little Boarding House	Ayers-Little Boarding House	April 16, 2008 (#08000292)	121 Athens St. 34°22′11″N 83°14′01″W	Carnesville	Frame one- and one-half-story house located at the southeastern corner of the courthouse square
4	Baty School		November 7, 1996 (#96001302)	GA 198, approximately .25 mi. N of jct. with GA 59; 34°21′40″N 83°16′53″W	Carnesville	
5	Beasley House		September 1, 1983 (#83000200)	75 Grogan St. 34°26′11″N 83°06′08″W	Lavonia	
6	Bellamy Historic District		November 7, 1996 (#96001304)	GA 51, approximately 2.75 mi. NW of jct. with I-85; 34°22′17″N 83°21′55″W	Carnesville	
7	John R. and Mary Bond House		November 7, 1996 (#96001301)	GA 59, approximately .5 mi. NE of jct. with GA 51; 34°20′50″N 83°18′29″W	Carnesville	
8	Bond-Baker-Carter House		September 11, 1986 (#86002403)	Address Restricted	Royston	
9	Brown-Kennedy House		November 7, 1996 (#96001303)	GA 59, approximately 1 mi. NE of jct. with GA 51; 34°21′03″N 83°18′02″W	Carnesville	
10	Burton House		September 1, 1983 (#83000201)	Augusta Rd. 34°25′57″N 83°06′27″W	Lavonia	
11	Cannon-McDaniel House		September 1, 1983 (#83000202)	126 West Ave. 34°26′01″N 83°07′00″W	Lavonia	
12	Canon Commercial Historic District		August 1, 1985 (#85001681)	Depot St. between Bond Ave. & Broad St. 34°20′46″N 83°06′36″W	Canon	
13	Cason House		September 1, 1983 (#83000203)	60 Grogan St. 34°26′11″N 83°06′13″W	Lavonia	
14	Cheek House	Cheek House	September 1, 1983 (#83000204)	38 Hartwell Rd. 34°26′02″N 83°06′05″W	Lavonia	
15	Crawford-Shirley House		September 1, 1983 (#83000205)	100 Augusta Rd. 34°25′41″N 83°06′22″W	Lavonia	
16	Cromer's Mill Covered Bridge	Cromer's Mill Covered Bridge	August 17, 1976 (#76000619)	8 mi. S of Carnesville at Nails Creek; 34°16′29″N 83°15′57″W	Carnesville	
17	Fisher House		September 1, 1983 (#83000206)	221 Hartwell Rd. 34°25′59″N 83°05′57″W	Lavonia	
18	Franklin County Courthouse	Franklin County Courthouse	September 18, 1980 (#80001069)	Courthouse Sq. 34°22′12″N 83°14′05″W	Carnesville	
19	Hamilton Historic District	Hamilton Historic District	November 7, 1996 (#96001300)	GA 51, approximately .5 mi. NW of jct. with I-85; 34°20′54″N 83°19′49″W	Carnesville	
20	Historic Churches of Canon Historic District	Historic Churches of Canon Historic District	August 1, 1985 (#85001680)	Broad St. at Canon Ave. 34°20′41″N 83°06′35″W	Canon	
21	Jones Street Residential Historic District		September 1, 1983 (#83000207)	Jones, Baker, and Old Carnesville Rd. 34°26′16″N 83°06′32″W	Lavonia	
22	Keese House	Keese House	September 1, 1983 (#83000208)	4 Burgess St. 34°25′57″N 83°06′34″W	Lavonia	
23	Kidd House		September 1, 1983 (#83000209)	222 Hartwell Rd. 34°25′56″N 83°06′00″W	Lavonia	
24	Killingsworth Farm		September 1, 1983 (#83000210)	Hartwell Rd. 34°25′54″N 83°05′27″W	Lavonia	
25	Lavonia-Carnegie Library	Lavonia-Carnegie Library	September 1, 1983 (#83000211)	Hartwell Rd. 34°26′05″N 83°06′14″W	Lavonia	
26	Lavonia Commercial Historic District	Lavonia Commercial Historic District	September 1, 1983 (#83000212)	Jones, Augusta, Vickery, Grogan, Bowman Sts. 34°26′10″N 83°06′24″W	Lavonia	
27	Lavonia Cotton Mill	Lavonia Cotton Mill	September 1, 1983 (#83000213)	Main St. 34°25′45″N 83°06′08″W	Lavonia	
28	Lavonia Roller Mill	Lavonia Roller Mill	September 1, 1983 (#83000214)	E. Main St. 34°26′01″N 83°06′17″W	Lavonia	
29	McConnell Historic District	McConnell Historic District	November 7, 1996 (#96001299)	GA 51, approximately 2.5 mi. NW of jct. with I-85; 34°22′00″N 83°21′13″W	Carnesville	
30	McMurray House		September 1, 1983 (#83000215)	Hartwell Rd. 34°25′59″N 83°06′03″W	Lavonia	
31	Pure Oil Service Station		September 1, 1983 (#83000216)	56 West Ave. 34°26′07″N 83°06′28″W	Lavonia	
32	Queen House		September 1, 1983 (#83000217)	Hartwell Rd. 34°25′54″N 83°05′25″W	Lavonia	
33	Royston Commercial Historic District	Royston Commercial Historic District	September 5, 1985 (#85001969)	Along Church and Railroad Sts. 34°17′12″N 83°06′37″W	Royston	
34	Southern Cotton Oil Co.	Southern Cotton Oil Co.	September 1, 1983 (#83000218)	W. Main St. 34°26′00″N 83°06′20″W	Lavonia	
35	Stevenson House and Brickyard		September 1, 1983 (#83000219)	Hartwell Rd. 34°26′02″N 83°06′08″W	Lavonia	
36	Stovall Homeplace		September 1, 1983 (#83000220)	114 West Ave. 34°25′48″N 83°07′02″W	Lavonia	
37	Stovall-Purcell House		September 1, 1983 (#83000221)	110 West Ave. 34°26′00″N 83°06′54″W	Lavonia	
38	Strange-Duncan House	Strange-Duncan House	November 7, 1996 (#96001298)	GA 51, approximately .75 mi. E of the Franklin-Banks County line 34°22′16″N 83°22′48″W	Carnesville	
39	Vandiver House		September 1, 1983 (#83000222)	Main St. 34°26′28″N 83°06′36″W	Lavonia	
40	Vickery House		September 1, 1983 (#83000223)	Grogan St. 34°26′10″N 83°06′15″W	Lavonia	
41	Vickery Street Historic District		September 1, 1983 (#83000224)	Vickery St. 34°26′28″N 83°06′23″W	Lavonia	
42	Walnut Hill Historic District	Walnut Hill Historic District	November 7, 1996 (#96001296)	GA 51, approximately 1 mi. NW of jct. with I-85; 34°21′23″N 83°20′34″W	Carnesville	
43	West Avenue-Roberts Street Residential Historic District		September 1, 1983 (#83000225)	Between Mason and Jones Sts. 34°26′05″N 83°06′36″W	Lavonia	
44	Yow House	Yow House	September 1, 1983 (#83000226)	109 Hartwell Rd. 34°26′01″N 83°06′02″W	Lavonia	Home of Georgia Governor Ernest Vandiver
