= Ayden =

Ayden may refer to:

== Places ==
- Ayden, North Carolina
- Ayden Historic District
- Ayden-Grifton High School

== People ==
- Ayden (given name)

== See also ==
- Adyen, a Dutch payment company
