= Vickery House =

Vickery House may refer to:

in the United States (by state then city)

- Fields Place-Vickery House, Dahlonega, Georgia, listed on the National Register of Historic Places (NRHP) in Lumpkin County
- Gulley-Vickery-Blackwell House, Hartwell, Georgia, listed on the NRHP in Hart County, Georgia
- Horton-Vickery House, Hartwell, Georgia, listed on the NRHP in Hart County, Georgia
- Vickery House (Lavonia, Georgia), listed on the NRHP in Franklin County, Georgia
- Capt. David Vickery House, Taunton, Massachusetts, listed on the NRHP in Bristol County, Massachusetts
- Vickery-Baylies House, Taunton, Massachusetts, listed on the NRHP in Bristol County, Massachusetts
- Richard Vickery House, Waxahachie, Texas, listed on the NRHP in Ellis County, Texas

== People ==
- Vickery House, a priest convicted of sexual assault: see Anglican Communion sexual abuse cases

== See also ==
- McMullan-Vickery Farm, Hartwell, Georgia, listed on the NRHP in Hart County, Georgia
- Vickery Building, Augusta, Maine, listed on the NRHP in Kennebec County
