= Leila Ross Wilburn =

American architect

- Born: November 8, 1885; Macon, Georgia, US
- Died: November 12, 1967 (aged 82)
- Education: Agnes Scott College
- Occupation: Architect

Leila Ross Wilburn (1885–1967) was an early 20th-century architect, one of the first women in Georgia to enter that profession.

== Early life ==
Leila Ross Wilburn was born in Macon, Georgia. She was the first of five children of Joseph Gustavus Wilburn and Leila Ada Ross. Her father was a bookkeeper while her mother was a graduate of Wesleyan Female College in Macon who had studied at the Philadelphia Academy of Fine Arts.

In the midst of the economic depression of 1895, her family moved to Atlanta. From 1902 to 1904, Wilburn attended Agnes Scott Institute where she studied liberal arts and science. She also took private lessons in architectural drawing.

After graduating college, Wilburn traveled around the country to study the emerging Arts and Crafts movement and created a library of 5,000 photographs of inspiring homes.

In 1906-1907, she apprenticed with B. R. Padgett and Son, a firm specializing in residences. She received most of her training with Padgett and became the South's second female architect (the first was Henrietta Dozier). Her first commission at Padgett was a three-story building that became the YMCA gymnasium at Georgia Military Academy (now Woodward Academy).

== Career as an independent architect ==
In 1909, Wilburn opened her own firm. She focused on home design which was considered the most appropriate field of architecture for a woman. Fittingly, she opened her office not in the Candler Building, where architects' offices were concentrated, but in the Peters Building, occupied by realtors and developers.

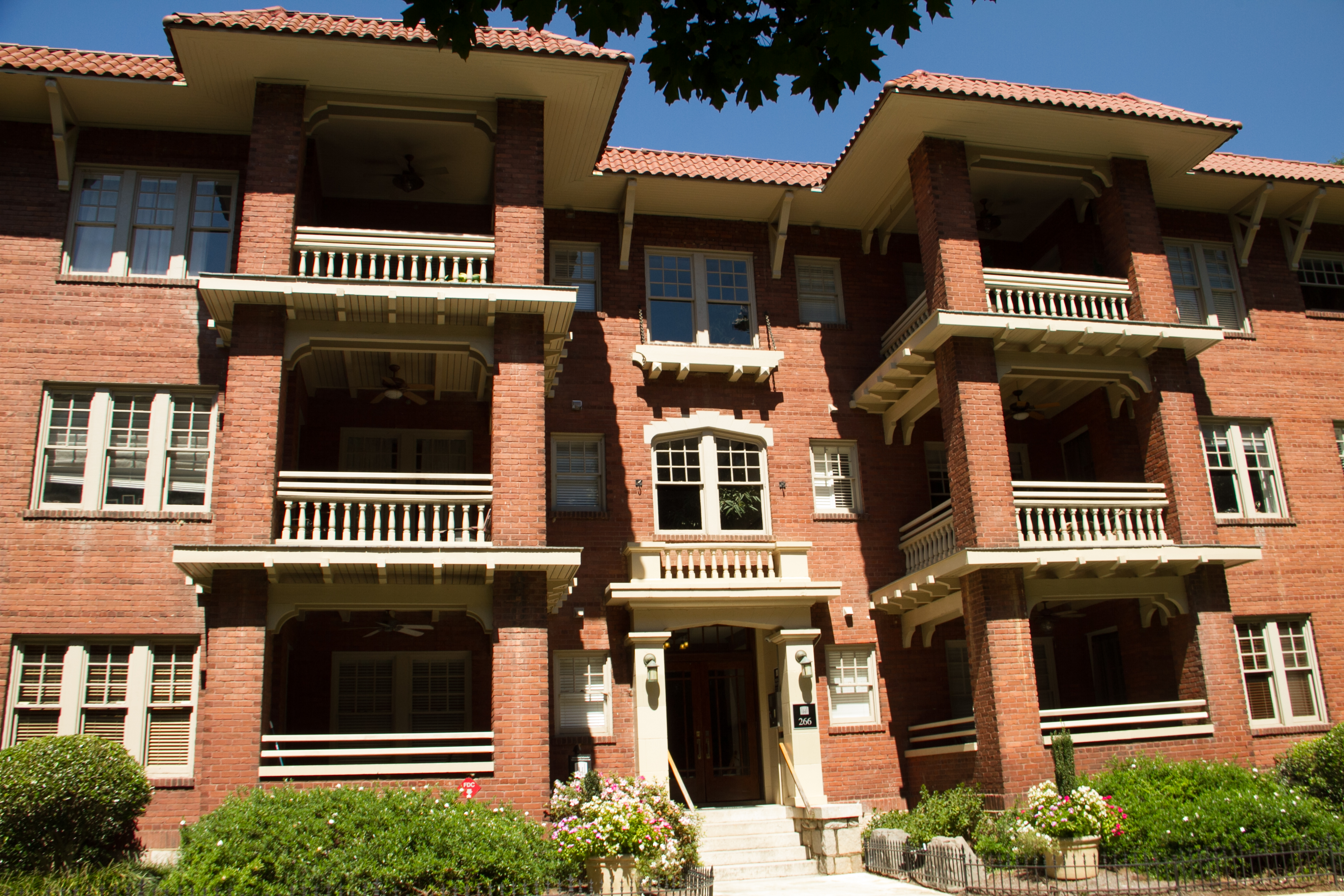
Piedmont Park Apartments (now Wilburn House condominiums) in Atlanta, designed by Leila Ross Wilburn and listed on the National Register of Historic Places.

Rather than catering to wealthy clients, Wilburn marketed her residential designs to the middle class through a series of plan books. This was a propitious choice as Atlanta's suburbs were expanding and there was a need for new apartment buildings in the city. Thanks to her location in the Peters Building, she developed close ties with contractors, builders, and developers, who bought her plan books and her plans and built her houses by the hundreds. Her plan books allowed middle class buyers to benefit from her expertise without having to pay the fees of a professional architect.

Beginning with Southern Homes and Bungalows in 1914, Wilburn’s published nine plan books. She is the only female architect known to have published plan books. In her first plan book, Wilburn emphasized "homes suitable for the climatic conditions of the Southeast" featuring porches, verandas, sun porches and sleeping porches. Stock plans cost $25 to $40, while custom plans cost upwards of $100.

Wilburn is most associated with Craftsman style homes, but she also created plan books of brick, ranch and colonial homes.

Wilburn touted her home making expertise as a woman, writing: “Being a woman I feel that I may know the little things that should go in it to make living in the house a pleasure to the entire family.” However, Wilburn did not necessarily encourage other women to enter the field. She felt that the long training and low initial pay meant that architecture was only a good choice for women committed to a long professional career.

During World War I Wilburn worked as a civilian for the War Department in 1918 at Fort McPherson, in southwest Atlanta, and in World War II she served as an engineering draftsman.

== Later life and death ==
Wilburn practiced as an architect until her death in 1967. She is buried in Decatur Cemetery.

== Legacy ==
According to architectural historian Robert Craig, Wilburn is Georgia's most prolific architect. She designed at least eighty houses, twenty apartment buildings and twenty-four duplexes in Atlanta. Many of the homes in the MAK Historic District in Decatur were also designed by Wilburn. Wilburn homes can also be seen in Florida, North Carolina, South Carolina, Mississippi, and Michigan.

Every May, the City of Decatur and the Decatur Preservation Commission hand out the Leila Ross Wilburn Award for individuals or organizations that promote preservation and/or excellence in design.

The Leila Ross Wilburn Papers at the Atlanta Historical Society document over 300 sets of house plans drawn by Wilburn.

In 2018, Sarah J. Boykin and Susan M. Hunter published a survey of the southern homes built from Wilburn’s plan books, examining Wilburn’s architectural legacy and her achievements as a plan book architect. The University of Georgia Press described Wilburn's work as "appealing, historic homes and represent some of the richest examples of southern vernacular architecture to emerge from the plan book tradition."

== Works ==
Works include (attribution):

- Horner Houses, 304 and 308 N. Fisher St. Burlington, NC (Wilburn, Leila Ross), NRHP-listed
- Hedrick-Ashley House, 310 S. 10th Ave., Lanett, Alabama (Wilburn, Leila Ross), 1916, Design No. 564, Page 48-49, Southern Homes And Bungalows, (built on custom plans)
- Kidd House, 222 Hartwell Rd. Lavonia, GA (Wilburn, Leila Ross), NRHP-listed
- Martin Historic District, Along both sides of GA 17 and the Norfolk Southern RR tracks Martin, GA (Wilburn, Leila Ross), NRHP-listed
- Piedmont Park Apartments, 266 11th St. Atlanta, GA (Wilburn, Leila Ross), NRHP-listed
- Piedmont and Third Condominiums, previously known as The Chatham Court, 690 Piedmont Ave. Atlanta, GA (Wilburn, Leila Ross), NRHP-listed
- Alexander Stephens Skelton House, 214 Athens St. Hartwell, GA (Wilburn, Leila Ross), NRHP-listed
- One or more works in Ayden Historic District, roughly bounded by Verna St., Peachtree St., E. College St. and Planters St. Ayden, NC (Wilburn, Leila Ross), NRHP-listed
- One or more works in Collins Avenue Historic District, Collins Ave. Acworth, GA (Wilburn, Leila Ross), NRHP-listed
- One or more works in Greenville Street-LaGrange Street Historic District, LaGrange, Ninnons, Greenville, Powell, Reese, Powell and Buchanan Sts. Newnan, GA (Wilburn, Leila Ross), NRHP-listed
- One or more works in West Avenue-Roberts Street Residential Historic District, Between Mason and Jones Sts. Lavonia, GA (Wilburn, Leila Ross), NRHP-listed
- One or more works in Winnona Park Historic District, Roughly bounded by E. College Ave., Avery St., S. Columbia Dr., and Mimosa Dr. Decatur, GA (Wilburn, Leila Ross), NRHP-listed
- [Candler Park] 1234 Mclendon Avenue NE, Atlanta, GA 30307
- [Virginia Highland] 1102 Saint Charles Pl NE, Atlanta, GA 30306
- [Morningside] 1319 Northview Ave NE, Atlanta, GA 30306
- [Historic Druid Hills] 923 Springdale Road, Atlanta, GA 30307
- Sherman House, 16870 Co Rd 32, Summerdale, AL, 36580; constructed 1937 from plan #5668 in Homes in Good Taste. (Wilburn, Leila Ross)
- Reed House, 3080 Atlanta Rd SE, Smyrna, GA 30080; circa 1910

== Honors ==
In 1961, Wilburn was welcomed into the Society of American Registered Architects, an honor which is reflected in the fact that the membership certificate at the time still read, “Having given evidence of his qualifications....”

Wilburn was inducted as a Georgia Woman of Achievement in 2003 as "one of the pioneering women architects in the United States".
