= Player to be named later =

Unnamed MLB player involved in an exchange of players between teams

In Major League Baseball, a player to be named later (PTBNL) is an unnamed player involved in exchange or "trade" of players between teams. The terms of a trade are not finalized until a later date, most often following the conclusion of the season.

Postponing a trade's final conditions or terms is often done for several reasons. First, the team receiving the PTBNL might not be certain which position they want to fill, so this type of deal gives them more time to figure it out. Second, this type of arrangement gives the team receiving the PTBNL more time to evaluate the available talent on the other team. Also, when a trade takes place during August, a player must clear waivers before he can be traded; the PTBNL concept allows the player's original team to make an attempt to have him clear waivers then finalize the deal, or (if the player cannot clear waivers) wait until the end of the season to trade him.

Before 2015, newly-drafted players could not be traded until one year after being drafted. Some players who were ineligible to be traded were instead listed as players to be named later, and were only named once eligible to be traded, such as Trea Turner, who played in the San Diego Padres organization for months even as it was considered an "open secret" that he would be the player to be named later in a trade with the Washington Nationals. In 2015, the rules were changed to allow for players to be traded after the conclusion of the World Series following the draft in which they were selected and a restriction was added to prohibit a player not eligible to be traded at the time of the transaction from being the player to be named later.

When a PTBNL transaction occurs, the negotiating teams usually agree on a list of five to ten players that the PTBNL will ultimately be chosen from.

The deal must close within six months of the conclusion of the rest of the trade. If the teams can't agree on who the player will be, then they will agree on a price to be paid instead of a player. It is possible that a player could end up being traded for himself, as has happened four times in MLB history.

The PTBNL is generally a minor league player or a journeyman major leaguer. Very few PTBNLs are of known star quality at the time of the trade; however, some minor league PTBNLs have gone on to be productive in the majors, including Michael Brantley, Jeremy Bonderman, Scott Podsednik, Coco Crisp, Marco Scutaro, Moisés Alou, Jason Schmidt, Gio González, David Ortiz, and Trea Turner.

== Notable PTBNLs ==
=== Hall of Famers ===
==== David Ortiz ====
On September 13, 1996, future Hall of Famer David Ortiz was traded from the Seattle Mariners to the Minnesota Twins as the player to be named later to complete an earlier transaction for Dave Hollins.

==== Dave Winfield and the 1994 strike ====
Dave Winfield, a Baseball Hall of Famer, near the end of his career, was included in a PTBNL trade complicated by the 1994 strike.

While a member of the Minnesota Twins, Winfield was traded on August 31, 1994, to the Cleveland Indians for a PTBNL. Under the terms and conditions of the trade, if Winfield appeared in 16 or more games with the Indians, the Twins would receive a Class AA-level PTBNL, but if he played between one and 15 games the PTBNL would be Class A-level.

However, the strike led to the season eventually being canceled with no further games played. To settle the trade, Cleveland paid Minnesota a token sum of $100, and the Indians' general manager took the Twins' general manager out to dinner and picked up the dinner tab (official sources list the transaction as Winfield having been sold by the Twins to the Indians).

=== All-Stars ===
Several players who were a PTBNL have gone on to make an MLB All-Star roster:

- Moisés Alou
- Michael Brantley
- Scott Brosius
- Gio González
- Ted Lilly
- Jesse Orosco
- David Ortiz
- Scott Podsednik
- Jason Schmidt
- Marco Scutaro
- Trea Turner
- Dmitri Young
- David Fry
- Drew Pomeranz

=== Players traded for themselves ===
Four players in MLB history were traded for a PTBNL, then subsequently traded back to their original teams, thus being players that were traded for themselves:

- Harry Chiti was traded to the 1962 New York Mets from the Cleveland Indians for a PTBNL. However, the teams could not agree on a final deal, so the Mets traded Chiti back to Cleveland.
- Brad Gulden was traded from the New York Yankees to the Seattle Mariners in 1980 for a PTBNL, then in May 1981 Seattle traded him back to the Yankees.
- In 1987, Dickie Noles was traded from the Chicago Cubs to the Detroit Tigers for a PTBNL. As with Chiti, the teams could not agree on a final deal, and Noles was traded back to the Cubs.
- On July 22, 2005, John McDonald was traded from the Toronto Blue Jays to the Detroit Tigers for a PTBNL. McDonald was subsequently re-acquired by Toronto on November 10, 2005, in a cash transaction completing the trade.

== In popular culture ==
In the movie Bull Durham, Kevin Costner's character Crash Davis introduces himself to his new manager as "I'm the player to be named later".

== In other sports ==
In the National Hockey League, future considerations work in a similar fashion to PTBNLs, except that heavily conditional draft picks are usually traded instead of cash, because the NHL allows teams to trade draft picks, but not to trade players or draft picks for cash.

In the National Basketball Association, the equivalent is a top-55 protected second round pick (there are only 60 picks in the NBA draft, so this is the maximum allowable protection) or the rights to a player, usually playing for an overseas team, whom the team drafted some time ago but does not intend to sign to an NBA contract. The team trading the player also receives a trade exception, or salary credit to be utilized in a future trade, worth the guaranteed salary of the player.

== See also ==
- Major League Baseball transactions
