= Eric Blount =

American gridiron football player (born 1970)

Profile
- Position: Running back

Personal information
- Born: September 22, 1970 (age 56); Ayden, North Carolina, U.S.
- Listed height: 5 ft 9 in (1.75 m)
- Listed weight: 192 lb (87 kg)

Career information
- High school: Ayden-Grifton
- College: North Carolina
- NFL draft: 1992: 8th round, 220th overall pick

Career history
- 1992–1993: Phoenix Cardinals
- 1994–1997: Edmonton Eskimos
- 1998: Winnipeg Blue Bombers
- 1999: Toronto Argonauts
- 1999: Montreal Alouettes
- 2001–2002: Winnipeg Blue Bombers

Awards and highlights
- CFL All-Star (1998); CFL East All-Star (1998)
- Stats at Pro Football Reference

Eric Blount (born September 22, 1970) is an American former all-star running back in the Canadian Football League (CFL) and National Football League (NFL).

A North Carolina Tar Heel in college, Blount was drafted by and played two seasons with the Phoenix Cardinals. He primarily returned kicks in the NFL. In 1994, he signed with the Edmonton Eskimos and rushed for 1091 yards that season. After two more years with the Esks he starred with the Winnipeg Blue Bombers in 1998, being named an all-star; he led the league in total yards (3816, 2nd best in CFL history), punt return yards (1051), kickoff return yards (1695, a CFL record at the time), rushed for 599 yards, and added 339 more yards on 45 caught passes. He also played 4 regular season games with the Toronto Argonauts and 3 regular season games with the Montreal Alouettes, both in 1999.

On September 15, 1995, against Winnipeg at Edmonton, Blount scored 5 touchdowns, a team record and one short of the CFL record.
