= JH Rose High School =

American public school in North Carolina

J.H. Rose High School

Location
- 600 West Arlington Boulevard; Greenville, North Carolina 27834; United States; 35°35′38″N 77°23′02″W

Information
- Other names: J.H. Rose; Rose
- Type: Public
- Motto: Dedicated To Excellence In Education
- Established: 1957 (69 years ago)
- School district: Pitt County Schools
- CEEB code: 341650
- NCES School ID: 370001202142
- Principal: Dr. Nydra Jones
- Teaching staff: 78.54 (on an FTE basis)
- Grades: 9–12
- Enrollment: 1,565 (2023–2024)
- Student to teacher ratio: 19.93
- Colors: Kelly green, Columbia blue, and white
- Nickname: Rampants
- Website: jhr.pitt.k12.nc.us

Junius H. Rose High School (known colloquially as J.H. Rose or Rose) is a public high school in Greenville, North Carolina, United States. It is part of the Pitt County Schools district.

== History ==
J.H. Rose High School was established in 1957 on South Elm Street, in Greenville, North Carolina. Students that made up the original student body came from the former Greenville High School in downtown Greenville. Students from the former historically black C.M. Eppes High School were integrated in during the late 1960s and early 1970s. The school moved to its present location on Arlington Boulevard in 1992.

J.H. Rose High School was named after Junius Harris Rose (1892–1972). Junius, who went by "June", began his career in education as the principal of a high school in Kinston, North Carolina where afterwards, he transferred to a job at Bethel High School, before volunteering to serve in the U.S. Army during World War I. Following that, he was the Superintendent of Greenville, North Carolina City Schools from 1920 to 1967.

== Athletics ==
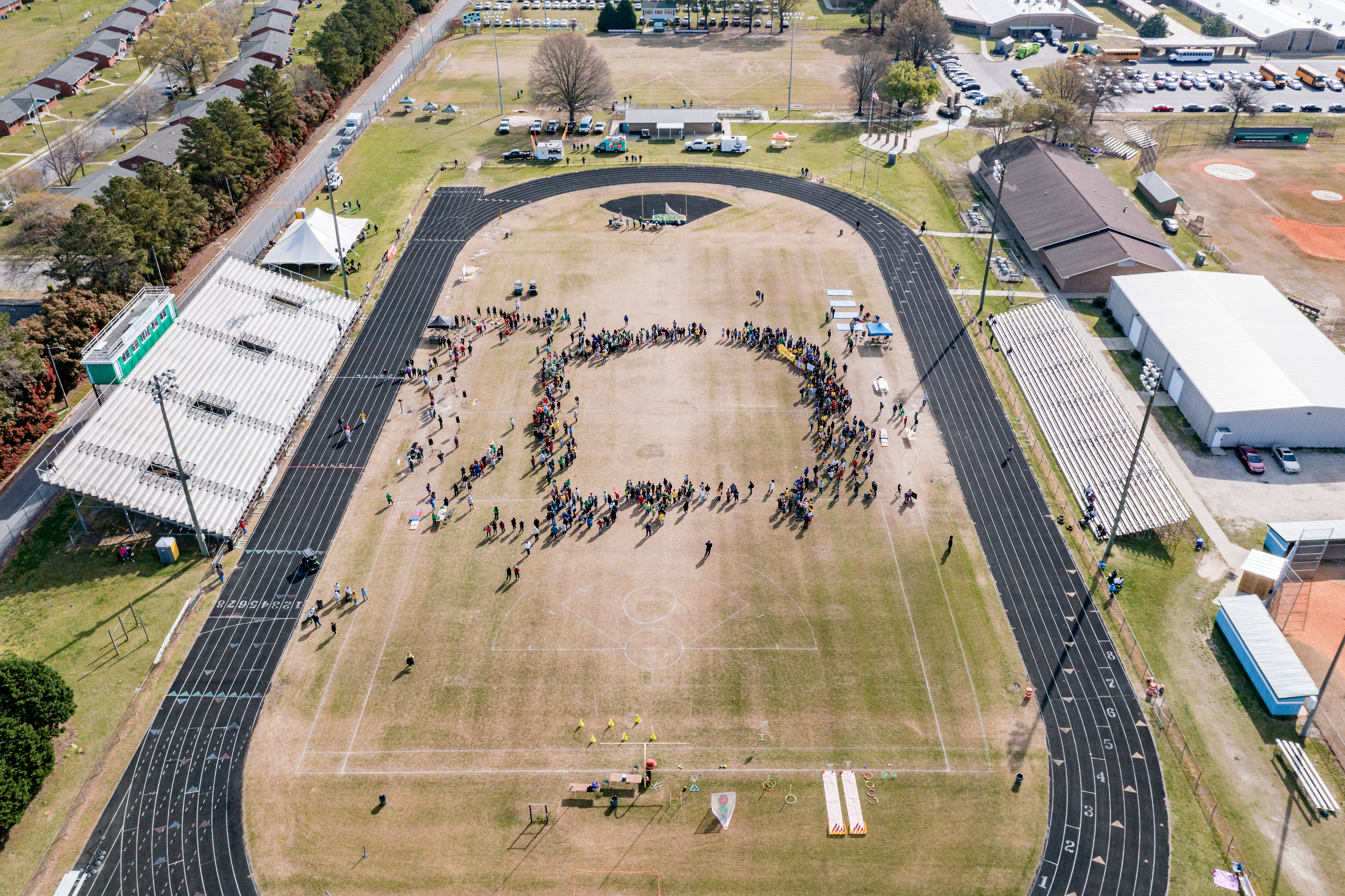
J.H. Rose High School stadium

J.H. Rose sports teams are known as the Rampants. The school is a member of the North Carolina High School Athletic Association (NCHSAA).

The school had a notable 4A state championship streak in American football, spanning four straight years from 2003 to 2006. They were also 4A American football state champions in 1975. The J.H. Rose baseball team has won five 4A state championships, winning in 1997, 1999, 2003, 2004, and 2008. They were the 3A baseball state champions in 2021.

The Rampant boys golf team won the 3A team state championship in 2022, led by the individual state champion Luke Mosely, where they finished 17 strokes ahead of state runner-up Terry Sanford High School. The Rampant girls golf team were the All Classes state champions in 1988 and 2000.

J.H. Rose's volleyball team were 4A state champions in 2008, 2009, and 2014.

== Notable alumni ==
- Clayton McCullough - manager for the Miami Marlins
- Jamie Brewington – MLB pitcher
- Andre Brown – NFL running back
- Derek Cox – former NFL cornerback
- Carlester Crumpler – NFL tight end
- Brian Farkas – State House Representative in the North Carolina General Assembly representing NC State House District 09
- William Frizzell – NFL cornerback
- Michael Harrington – soccer player
- Whit Haydn – magician
- Kelly Heath – MLB second baseman
- Al Hunter – NFL running back, primarily known as being the first player to enter the NFL through the supplemental draft
- Kristi Overton Johnson – former water skiing world champion
- Tim Longest – member of the North Carolina House of Representatives
- Will MacKenzie – professional golfer who played on the PGA Tour
- Lee Norris – actor
- Petey Pablo – rapper
- Doug Paschal – NFL running back
- Tommy Paul – professional tennis player
- Lauren Perdue – American swimmer, gold medalist in the 4×200-meter freestyle relay at the 2012 Summer Olympics
- Cornell Powell – NFL wide receiver
- Harold Randolph – CFL linnebacker
- Caroline Shaw – violinist, singer, composer
- Tom Smith – musician
- Troy Smith – NFL wide receiver
- Kentavius Street – NFL defensive end
- Joe West – MLB umpire
- Jermaine Williams – NFL running back
- Jonathan Williams – NFL and CFL running back
