= Kentavius Street =

American football player (born 1996)

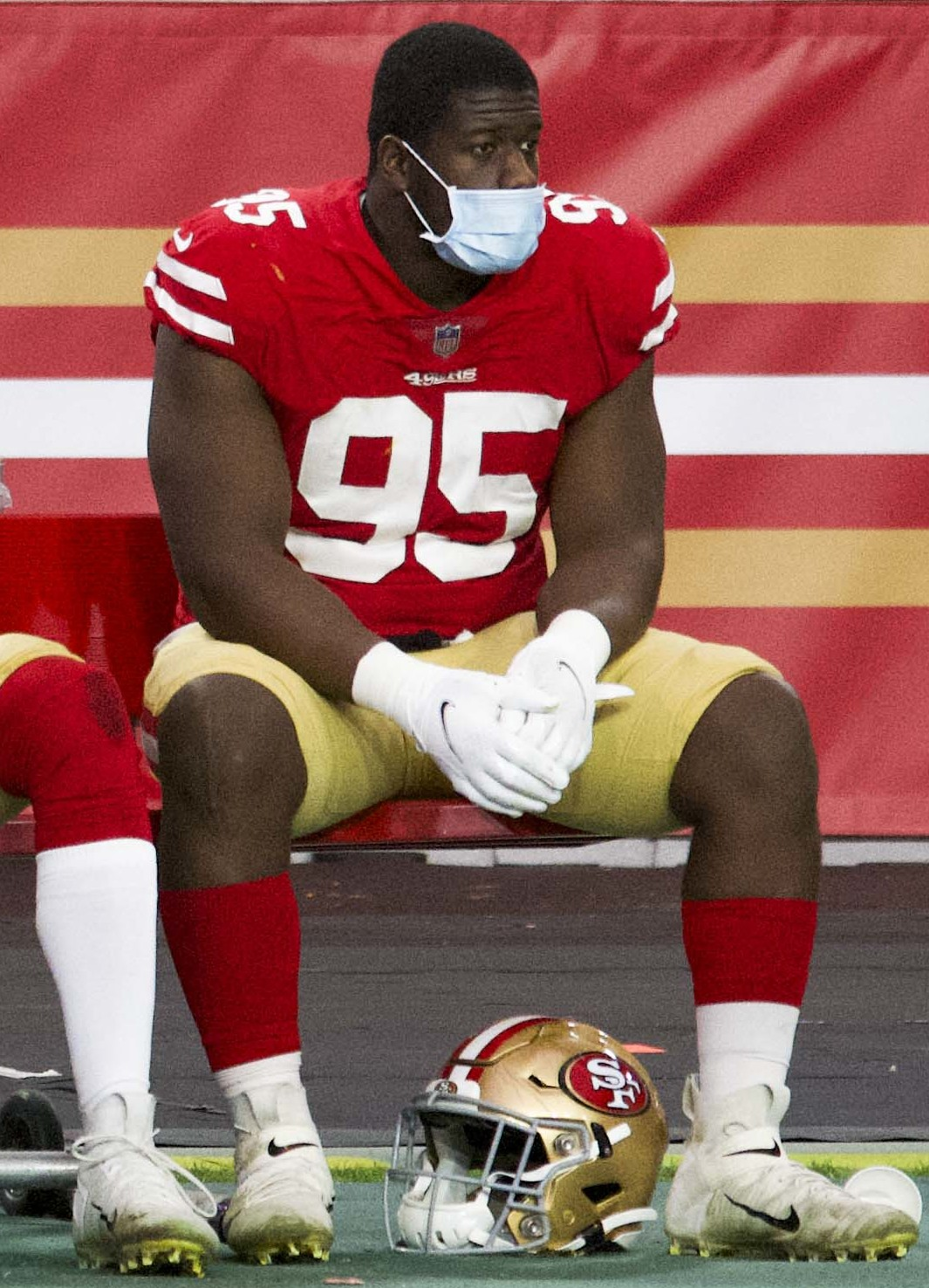
- Street with the San Francisco 49ers in 2020

No. 93 – Chicago Bears
- Position: Defensive tackle
- Roster status: Injured reserve

Personal information
- Born: May 8, 1996 (age 30); Douglas, Georgia, U.S.
- Listed height: 6 ft 2 in (1.88 m)
- Listed weight: 315 lb (143 kg)

Career information
- High school: J.H. Rose (Greenville, North Carolina)
- College: NC State (2014–2017)
- NFL draft: 2018: 4th round, 128th overall pick

Career history
- San Francisco 49ers (2018–2021); New Orleans Saints (2022); Philadelphia Eagles (2023); Atlanta Falcons (2023–2025); Chicago Bears (2026–present)

Career NFL statistics as of 2025
- Total tackles: 125
- Sacks: 10.5
- Forced fumbles: 1
- Fumble recoveries: 1
- Pass deflections: 2
- Stats at Pro Football Reference

Kentavius Rakevian Street (born May 8, 1996) is an American professional football defensive tackle for the Chicago Bears of the National Football League (NFL). He played college football for the NC State Wolfpack.

== Early life and college career ==
Street played defensive end and tight end at Junius H. Rose High School in Greenville, North Carolina. A 4-star defensive end recruit, Street committed to NC State to play college football over offers from Auburn, Clemson, Florida, Georgia, LSU, Miami, and Ole Miss, among others.

Street played for NC State from 2014-2017. After being used in a backup and rotational role as a freshman, he was a three-year starter along the defensive line from his sophomore through senior seasons. In 50 career games at NC State, Street recorded 119 total tackles, nine sacks, two forced fumbles, and four fumble recoveries.

Street was invited to, and participated in, the 2018 NFL Scouting Combine, and also participated in NC State’s pro day alongside defensive line teammates Bradley Chubb, BJ Hill, and Justin Jones.

On April 4, 2018, Street tore his ACL during a private pre-draft workout for the New York Giants, raising questions among scouts surrounding his draft stock as he would be unable to play during his rookie season.

== Professional career ==
Pre-draft measurables
Height	Weight	Arm length	Hand span	Wingspan	40-yard dash	10-yard split	20-yard split	Bench press
6 ft 2 1/4 in (1.89 m)	280 lb (127 kg)	32 7/8 in (0.84 m)	10 1/4 in (0.26 m)	6 ft 6 3/4 in (2.00 m)	4.87 s	1.67 s	2.79 s	28 reps
All values from NFL Combine

=== San Francisco 49ers ===
Despite the torn ACL suffered weeks before the draft, Street was selected by the San Francisco 49ers in the fourth round (128th overall) of the 2018 NFL draft. He was placed on the reserve/non-football injury list on September 1, 2018 due to his torn ACL, and did not play at all as a rookie accordingly.

On September 1, 2019, Street was placed on injured reserve after another knee injury required arthroscopic surgery. He was designated for return from injured reserve on December 4, 2019, and began practicing with the team again. He was activated on December 14, 2019. He was placed back on injured reserve on January 10, 2020. Without Street, the 49ers reached Super Bowl LIV, but lost 31–20 to the Kansas City Chiefs. He was placed on the active/physically unable to perform list at the start of training camp on July 28, 2020, and added back to the active roster seven days later.

=== New Orleans Saints ===
On March 18, 2022, Street signed with the New Orleans Saints.

=== Philadelphia Eagles ===
On March 30, 2023, Street signed with the Philadelphia Eagles on a one–year deal.

=== Atlanta Falcons ===
On October 31, 2023, Street, along with a 2025 seventh-round pick, was traded to the Atlanta Falcons in exchange for a 2024 sixth-round pick. He re-signed with the team on March 18, 2024.

On August 26, 2025, Street was released by the Falcons as part of final roster cuts and re-signed to the practice squad the next day. He was promoted to the active roster on November 14.

=== Chicago Bears ===
On March 13, 2026, Street signed a one-year contract with the Chicago Bears. He started seven of the first eight games, recording a sack before suffering a knee injury in Week 8 that resulted in him being placed on injured reserve on November 4.
