= Troy Smith (wide receiver) =

American football player (born 1977)

No. 19
- Position: Wide receiver

Personal information
- Born: July 30, 1977 (age 49); Greenville, North Carolina, U.S.
- Listed height: 6 ft 1 in (1.85 m)
- Listed weight: 193 lb (88 kg)

Career information
- High school: J.H. Rose (Greenville)
- College: East Carolina
- NFL draft: 1999: 6th round, 201st overall pick

Career history
- Philadelphia Eagles (1999)

Career NFL statistics
- Receptions: 1
- Receiving yards: 14
- Stats at Pro Football Reference

Troy Smith (born July 30, 1977) is an American former professional football player who was a wide receiver in the National Football League (NFL). He played college football for the East Carolina Pirates and was selected by the Philadelphia Eagles in the sixth round of the 1999 NFL draft and later tore his ligament in his leg on a 14-yard reception thrown by Koy Detmer in a game. His leg could not be healed, which forced him to discontinue play in the NFL.

He played basketball and football at Junius H. Rose High School and continued playing both sports at East Carolina University (basketball in his freshman year and football in his sophomore, junior, and senior years).

Pre-draft measurables
Height	Weight	Arm length	Hand span	40-yard dash	10-yard split	20-yard split	20-yard shuttle	Three-cone drill	Vertical jump	Broad jump
6 ft 1 in (1.85 m)	194 lb (88 kg)	31 in (0.79 m)	8 1/4 in (0.21 m)	4.63 s	1.62 s	2.68 s	4.24 s	7.25 s	35.5 in (0.90 m)	9 ft 4 in (2.84 m)
All values from NFL Combine

He is now the head coach of the Hope Middle School Mustangs football team in Greenville, North Carolina, the same town where he was born and raised.
