= Jonathan Williams (running back, born 1988) =

American gridiron football player (born 1988)

No. 23
- Position: Running back

Personal information
- Born: August 21, 1988 (age 38); Smithfield, North Carolina, U.S.
- Listed height: 6 ft 1 in (1.85 m)
- Listed weight: 210 lb (95 kg)

Career information
- High school: J.H. Rose (Greenville, North Carolina)
- College: East Carolina (2007–2010)
- NFL draft: 2011: undrafted

Career history
- 2011: Cincinnati Bengals*
- 2013: Calgary Stampeders
- 2014: Ottawa Redblacks
- * Offseason or practice squad member only
- Stats at CFL.ca

Jonathan Edward Williams (born August 21, 1988) is an American former professional football player who was a running back in the Canadian Football League (CFL) with the Calgary Stampeders and Ottawa Redblacks. He played college football at East Carolina University, and signed with the Cincinnati Bengals as an undrafted free agent.

== Early life ==
Williams played high school football at Junius H. Rose High School in Greenville, North Carolina. He helped the Rampants complete back-to-back 16–0 seasons, winning the Class 4A State Championships both years as a junior and senior. He earned all-conference and all-area honors in 2005 and 2006 and was a third-team All-America selection as a senior by EA Sports.

== College career ==
Williams played for the East Carolina Pirates from 2007 to 2010. He finished his college career with 1,415 rushing yards and 16 rushing touchdowns.

== Professional career ==
Williams was signed by the Cincinnati Bengals on July 28, 2011, after going undrafted in the 2011 NFL draft. He was released by the Bengals on August 23, 2011.

Williams signed with the Calgary Stampeders on June 23, 2013. He was released by the Stampeders on October 2, 2013.

Williams was signed to the Ottawa Redblacks' practice roster on September 15, 2014. He was promoted to the active roster on September 25, 2014. He was named CFL Offensive Player of the Week for Week 15 of the 2014 CFL season for recording 180 rushing yards, two rushing touchdowns and two receptions for 49 yards. Williams became a free agent after the 2014 season.
