= Canon, Georgia =

- City
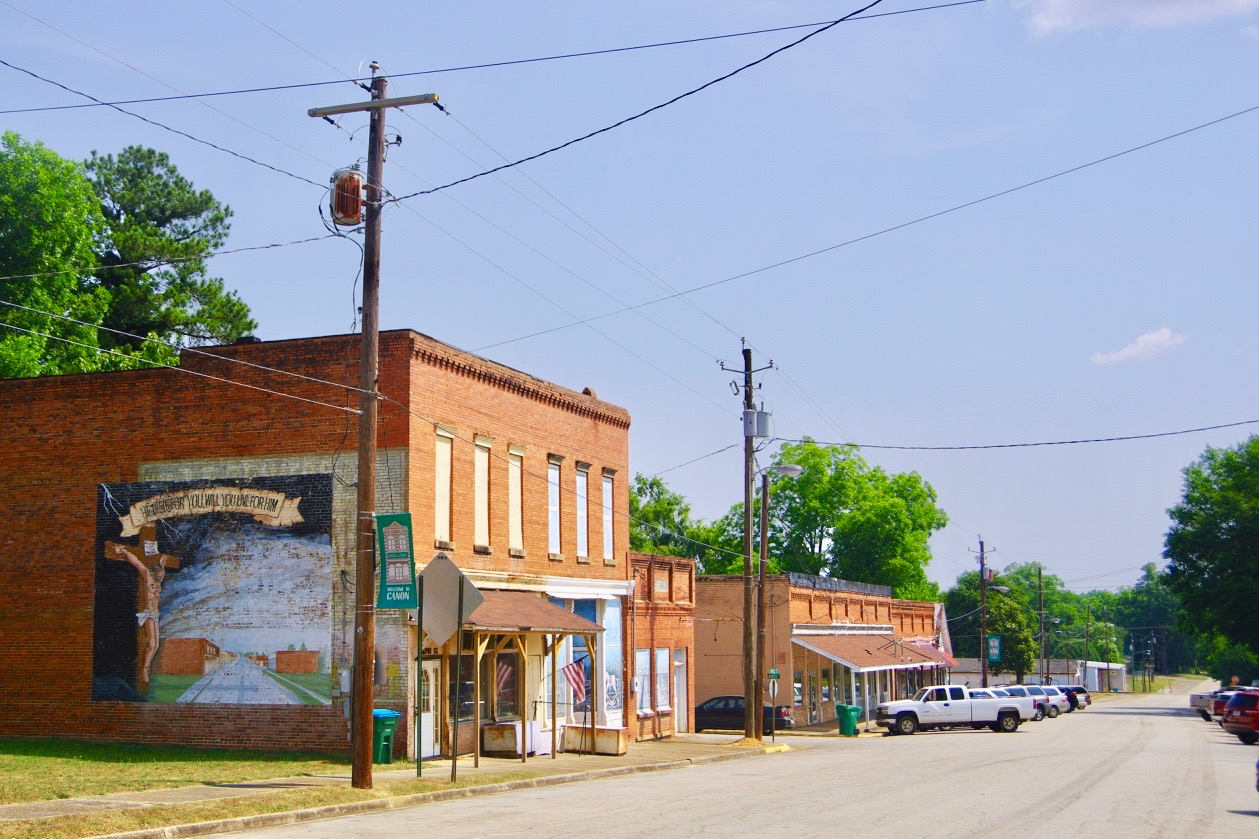
- Depot Street

- Location in Franklin County and the state of Georgia
- Coordinates: 34°20′44″N 83°6′31″W
- Country: United States
- State: Georgia
- Counties: Franklin, Hart

Area
  - Total: 3.13 sq mi (8.10 km^{2})
  - Land: 3.12 sq mi (8.08 km^{2})
  - Water: 0.0077 sq mi (0.02 km^{2})
- Elevation: 920 ft (280 m)

Population (2020)
  - Total: 643
  - Density: 206.0/sq mi (79.54/km^{2})
- Time zone: UTC−05:00 (Eastern (EST))
  - Summer (DST): UTC−04:00 (EDT)
- ZIP Code: 30520
- Area code: 706
- FIPS code: 13-12932
- GNIS feature ID: 0354984
- Website: cityofcanon.com

Canon is a city in Franklin and Hart counties in the U.S. state of Georgia. As of the 2020 census, Canon had a population of 643.

== History ==
Canon was originally called "West Bowersville", and under the latter name was laid out in 1875. The Georgia General Assembly incorporated the place as the "Town of Canon" in 1902, with the town corporate limits extending in a one-mile radius from the intersection of Broad and Depot streets.

== Geography ==
Canon is located in eastern Franklin County and western Hart County at 34°20′44″N 83°06′31″W. Georgia State Routes 17 and 51 pass through the center of town. SR 17 leads south 4 miles (6 km) to Royston, while SR 51 leads southwest by an indirect route 10 miles (16 km) to Sandy Cross. The two highways together lead northeast 2.5 miles (4.0 km) to Bowersville.

According to the United States Census Bureau, Canon has a total area of 3.1 square miles (8.1 km^{2}), of which 0.01 square miles (0.02 km^{2}), or 0.19%, is water.

== Demographics ==
Historical population
Census	Pop.	Note	%±
1910	728		—
1920	1,132		55.5%
1930	568		−49.8%
1940	496		−12.7%
1950	596		20.2%
1960	626		5.0%
1970	709		13.3%
1980	704		−0.7%
1990	737		4.7%
2000	755		2.4%
2010	804		6.5%
2020	643		−20.0%
U.S. Decennial Census

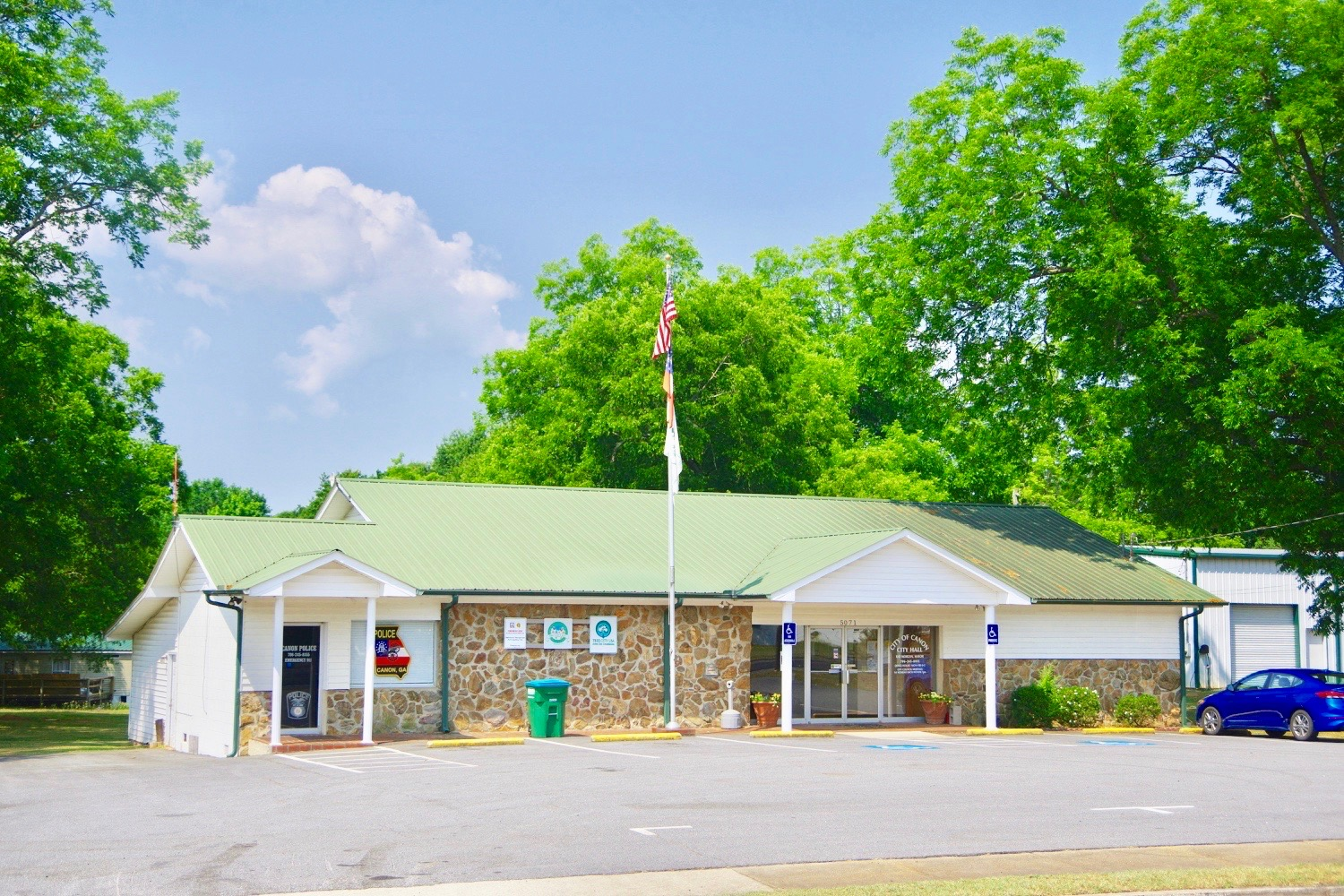
City hall

As of the census of 2000, there were 755 people, 315 households, and 221 families residing in the city. The population density was 237.5 inhabitants per square mile (91.7/km^{2}). There were 361 housing units at an average density of 113.5 per square mile (43.8/km^{2}). The racial makeup of the city was 94.97% White, 2.52% African American, 0.13% Native American, 0.26% Asian, 0.66% from other races, and 1.46% from two or more races. Hispanic or Latino of any race were 1.19% of the population.

There were 315 households, out of which 27.9% had children under the age of 18 living with them, 52.7% were married couples living together, 12.1% had a female householder with no husband present, and 29.8% were non-families. 27.3% of all households were made up of individuals, and 11.4% had someone living alone who was 65 years of age or older. The average household size was 2.40 and the average family size was 2.88.

In the city, the population was spread out, with 22.1% under the age of 18, 9.7% from 18 to 24, 26.5% from 25 to 44, 28.1% from 45 to 64, and 13.6% who were 65 years of age or older. The median age was 38 years. For every 100 females, there were 93.6 males. For every 100 females age 18 and over, there were 94.1 males.

The median income for a household in the city was $21,845, and the median income for a family was $24,375. Males had a median income of $25,446 versus $18,375 for females. The per capita income for the city was $12,855. About 22.2% of families and 26.6% of the population were below the poverty line, including 33.0% of those under age 18 and 25.2% of those age 65 or over.

== Notable person ==
- Ernest Vandiver, Georgia governor from 1959 to 1963
- Crash Davis, American professional baseball player whose name inspired that of the main character of the 1988 movie Bull Durham.

== See also ==
- Canon Commercial Historic District
- Historic Churches of Canon Historic District
