= Piedmont Park Apartments =

- U.S. National Register of Historic Places
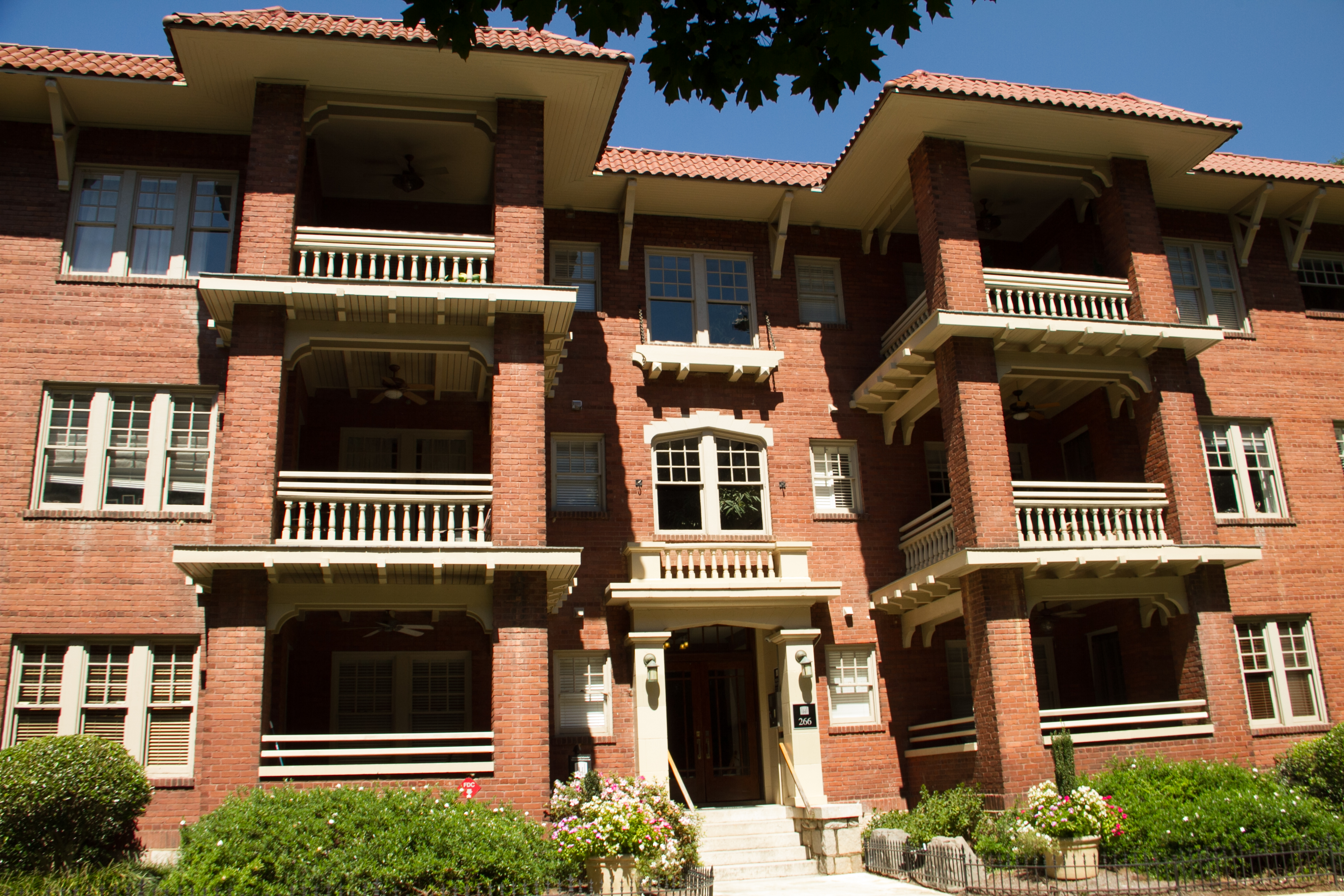

- Location within Atlanta
- Location: 266 11th St., N.E., Atlanta, Georgia
- Coordinates: 33°46′58″N 84°22′43″W
- Built: 1911
- Architect: Leila Ross Wilburn
- Architectural style: Craftsman
- NRHP reference No.: 03001104
- Added to NRHP: October 28, 2003

The Piedmont Park Apartments (known today as Wilburn House condominiums) in Midtown Atlanta, Georgia was built in 1911 and was designed by Leila Ross Wilburn, Georgia's first female architect.

The building is listed on the National Register of Historic Places, and is also designated as a historic building by the City of Atlanta.

== Construction ==
The building was designed by Wilburn in the Craftsman style popular in the early 1900s.

== History ==
The apartments were generally middle-class in nature and remained that way from first occupancy through the 1990s. In 2000, the building was restored and sold as condominiums along with two new neighboring buildings, all comprising the newly named three-building Wilburn House condominiums.
