= Demetrius Edwards =

American martial artist

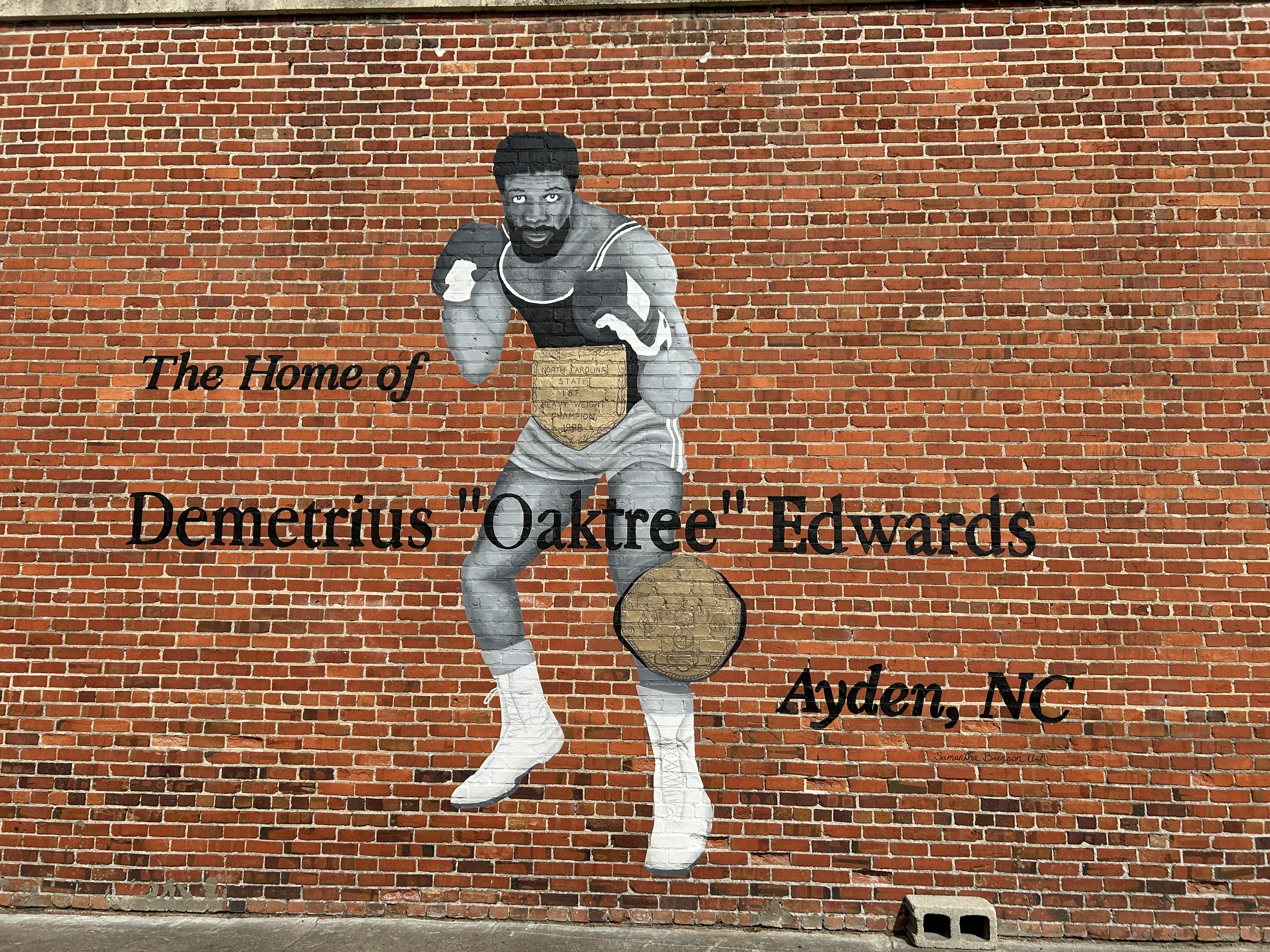
- A mural honoring Edwards in Ayden, North Carolina
- Other name: "Oaktree"
- Education: Ayden-Grifton High School
- Occupations: Boxer; Kickboxer; Karate-ka

Demetrius "Oaktree" Edwards is an American former boxer, kickboxer, and karate-ka. He is known for having been the Professional Karate Association World Heavyweight Champion and the International Boxing Federation North Carolina Heavyweight Champion.

== Biography ==
Demetrius Edwards is from Ayden, North Carolina. He grew up watching Bruce Lee films, which inspired him to become a fighter. He graduated from Ayden-Grifton High School in 1973. While in high school, he wrestled and played football. After graduation he joined the Washington Redskins. Four weeks after joining the team, he was attacked by a mugger. While defending himself, Edwards broke the mugger's neck, paralyzing him for life. Edwards was exonerated of any crime, but the event affected him deeply, and he quit football and returned to Ayden. He later learned of full contact karate and began training with Bill McDonald.

On August 12, 1981, he fought his first heavyweight match against Professional Karate Association World Heavyweight Champion Ross Scott, knocking him out and claiming the title for himself. The fight was broadcast on Sportsworld and had 20 million viewers; it was the highest-rated Sportsworld segment of the season. Edwards was given the nickname "Oaktree" in reference to his ability to take many hits and stand firm like an oak tree. In 1982, Edwards fought an exhibition match against Steve Shepherd and lost. He claimed that his loss was caused by him exhausting himself in losing twenty pounds to match Shepherd's weight before the fight. He published an open letter in the martial arts magazine Kick Illustrated challenging Shepherd to a rematch with the stipulation that he not have to lose any weight. He was International Boxing Federation North Carolina Heavyweight Champion in 1988.

A rumor states that Edwards broke the ribs of Mike Tyson in a sparring match, although this may be an urban legend. After retiring from martial arts, Edwards moved back to Ayden. There he teaches kickboxing to children. In 2025, a mural depicting Edwards was painted in Ayden to honor him.
