= Lavonia Commercial Historic District =

Historic district in Georgia, United States

- U.S. National Register of Historic Places
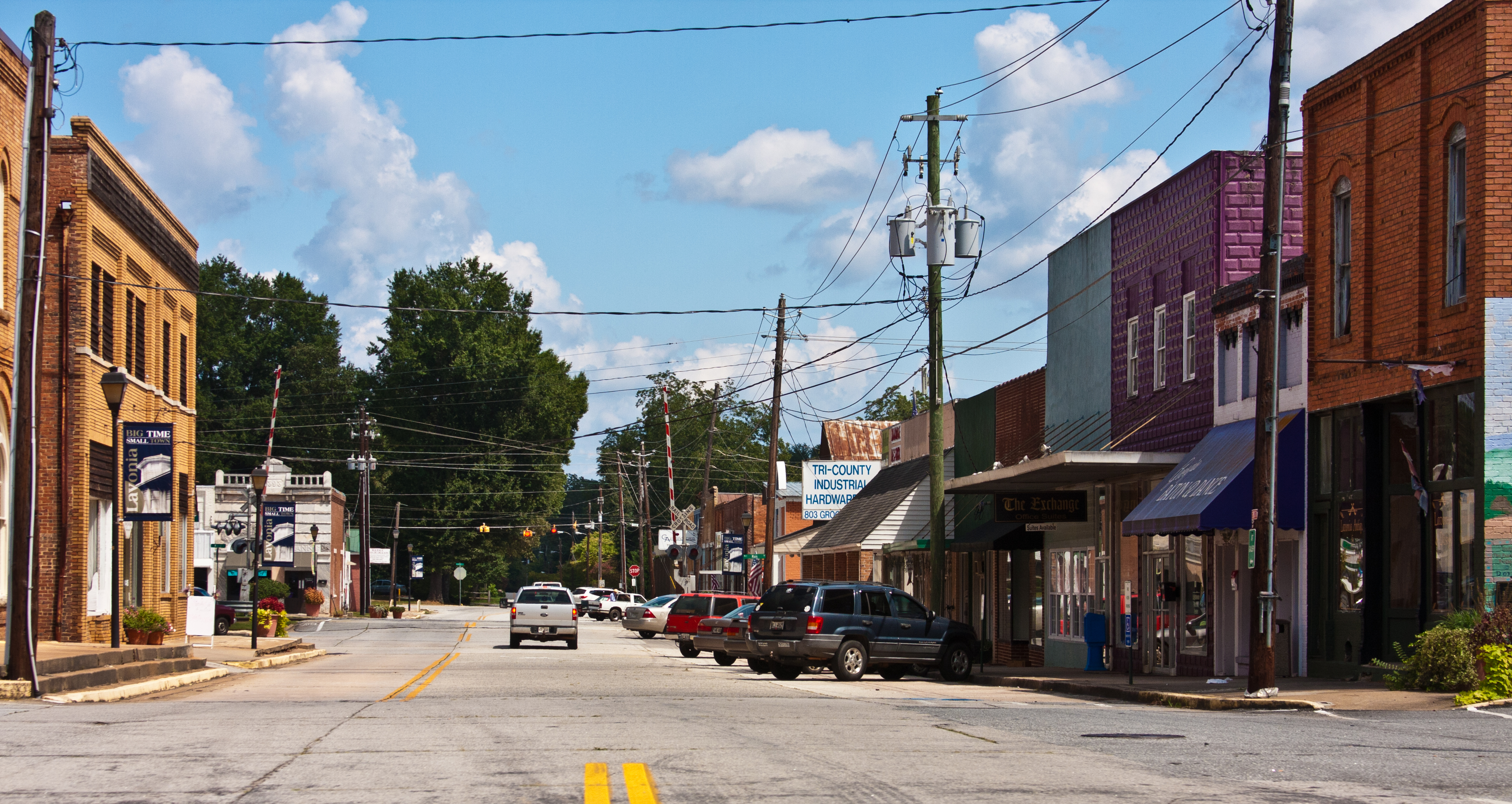

- Location within Georgia
- Location: Jones, Augusta, Vickery, Grogan, Bowman Sts., Lavonia, Georgia
- Coordinates: 34°26′10″N 83°06′24″W
- Area: 16.5 acres (6.7 ha)
- MPS: Lavonia MRA
- NRHP reference No.: 83000212
- Added to NRHP: September 1, 1983

The Lavonia Commercial Historic District in Lavonia, Georgia, is a 16.5-acre (6.7 ha) historic district which was listed on the National Register of Historic Places in 1983. The listing included 18 contributing buildings.

It includes the historic commercial center of Lavonia, mostly one- and two-story brick commercial buildings.

== Gallery ==
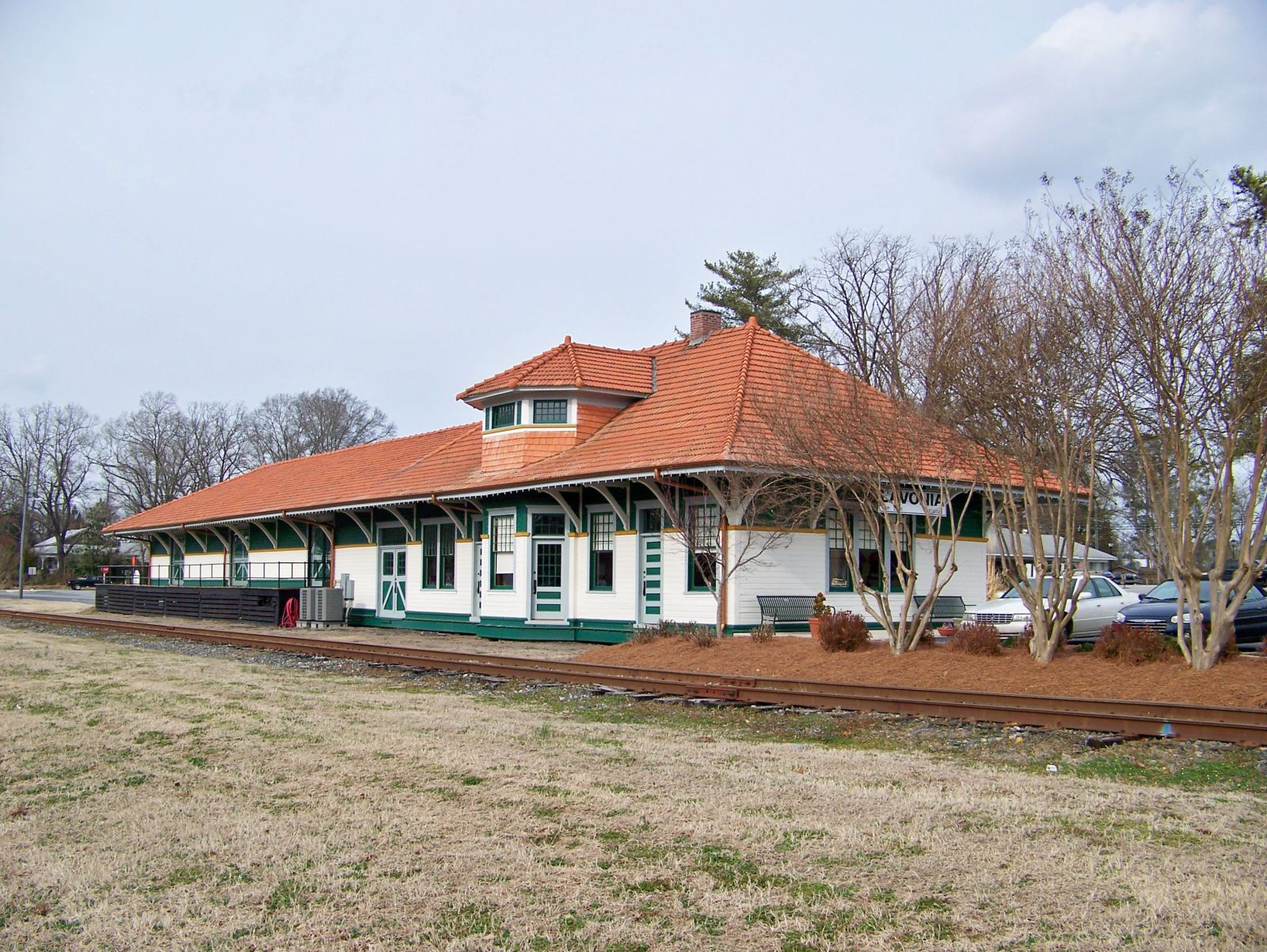
Lavonia Train Depot

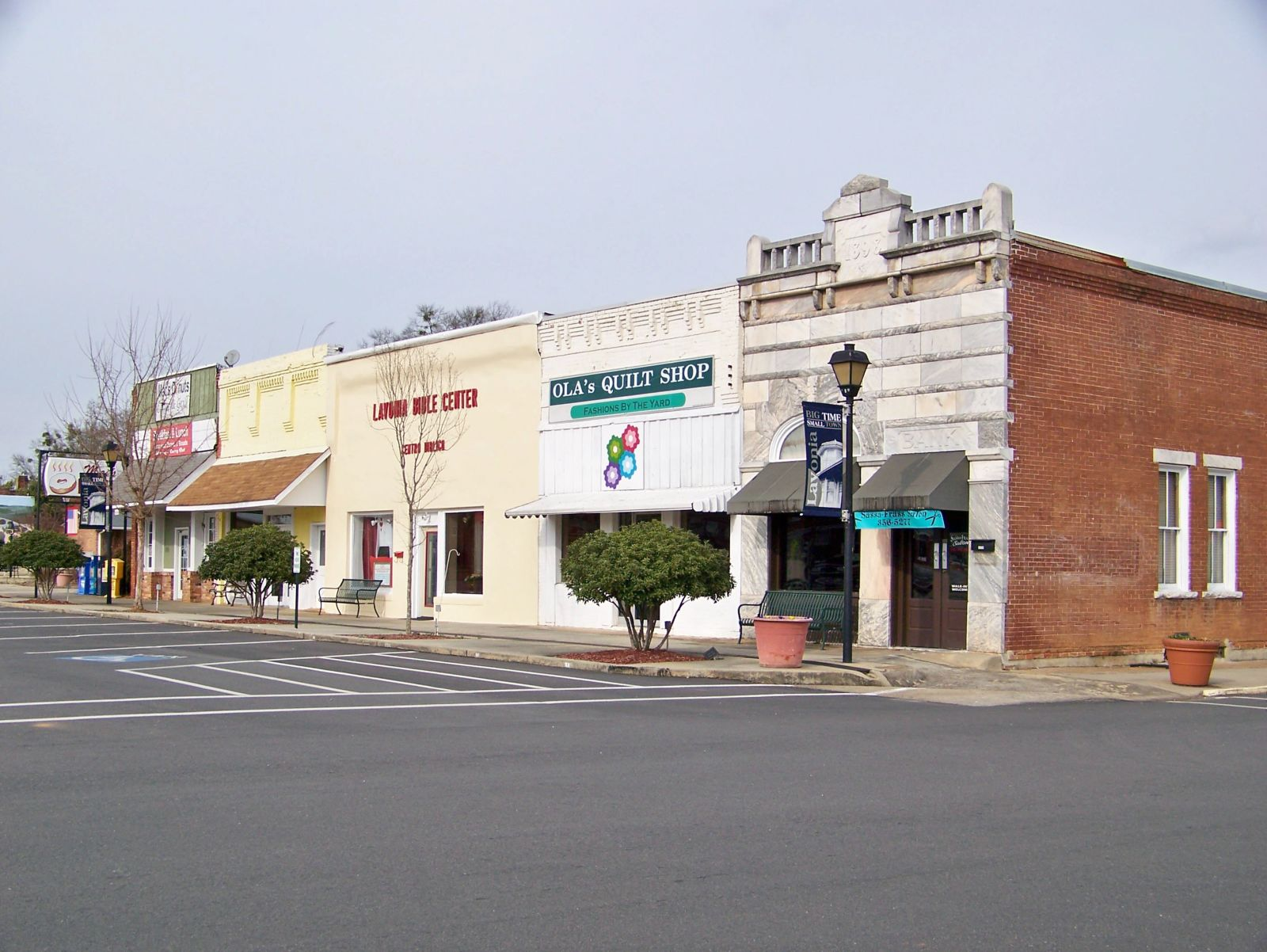
E. Main Street Businesses
