= Pitt County Schools =

School district in North Carolina, United States

Coordinates: 35.6130°N 77.3986°W

Location
- Pitt County, North Carolina United States

District information
- Type: Public
- Grades: PreK–12
- Superintendent: Steve M. Lassiter, Jr.

Students and staff
- Students: 23,487
- Teachers: 1,632.6 (on FTE basis)
- Student–teacher ratio: 14.4:1

Other information
- Website: www.pitt.k12.nc.us

Pitt County Schools is a school system located in Pitt County, North Carolina. The central office is located in Greenville. It operates one pre-kindergarten school, 16 elementary schools, six K–8, seven middle schools and six high schools.

The district includes the entire county.

== Schools ==
=== High schools ===
- Ayden-Grifton High School
- D. H. Conley High School
- Early College High School
- Farmville Central High
- Innovation Early College High
- Junius H. Rose High School
- North Pitt High School
- South Central High School

=== Middle schools ===
- A G Cox Middle
- Ayden Middle
- C M Eppes Middle
- E B Aycock Middle
- Farmville Middle
- H B Sugg Elementary
- Hope Middle
- Wellcome Middle

=== Elementary schools ===
- Ayden Elementary
- Belvoir Elementary
- Bethel Elementary
- Chicod
- Creekside Elementary
- Eastern Elementary
- Elmhurst Elementary
- Falkland Elementary
- G R Whitfield
- Grifton
- Lakeforest Elementary
- Northwest Elementary
- Pactolus
- Ridgewood Elementary
- Sam D Bundy Elementary
- South Greenville Elementary
- Stokes
- W H Robinson Elementary
- Wahl Coates Elementary
- Wintergreen Primary
- Wintergreen Intermediate

=== Other ===
- Vidant Health (1-12)
