= Crash Davis =

American baseball player (1919–2001)

- Second baseman
- Born: July 14, 1919; Canon, Georgia, U.S.
- Died: August 31, 2001 (aged 82); Greensboro, North Carolina, U.S.
- Batted: Right Threw: Right

MLB debut
- June 5, 1940, for the Philadelphia Athletics

Last MLB appearance
- September 20, 1942, for the Philadelphia Athletics

MLB statistics
- Batting average: .230
- Home runs: 2
- Runs batted in: 43
- Stats at Baseball Reference

Teams
- Philadelphia Athletics (1940–1942)

Lawrence Columbus "Crash" Davis (July 14, 1919 – August 31, 2001) was an American professional baseball player whose name inspired that of the main character of the 1988 movie Bull Durham.

== Early life and baseball career ==
Born in Canon, Georgia, and raised in Gastonia, North Carolina, Davis earned the nickname "Crash" at age 14, when he collided with a teammate when chasing down a fly ball.

In 1935, Davis was a member of the Gastonia Post 23 American Legion baseball team that won the American Legion national championship. As a member of Gastonia High School's baseball team, he helped them in winning the 1937 North Carolina Class A state title.

He played collegiate baseball at Duke University, where he excelled as a middle infielder and was captain of the baseball team. He was also a member of the Chi Phi fraternity.

After graduating from Duke, Davis played three seasons for the Philadelphia Athletics, batting .230 in 148 games.

== Later life ==
He was drafted into the United States Navy in 1942 amid World War II, and was assigned to Harvard University, where he helped run the NROTC program. Davis also coached Harvard's baseball and squash teams. His rate was Chief Petty Officer (Athletic Specialist). His main post was at the entrance to Eliot House.

When he was discharged from the Navy in 1946, Davis returned to Durham to begin graduate school at Duke and play for the Durham Bulls, then a part of the Carolina League. Davis would play in the minor leagues, with teams including the Reidsville Luckies and the Raleigh Capitals, until 1952.

After Bull Durham was released, Davis became a minor celebrity. He befriended the director of the film, Ron Shelton, and Shelton gave him a bit part in his movie Cobb about controversial baseball player Ty Cobb.

Sometime during the mid 1950s, Davis began working for the textile conglomerate Burlington Industries at their Gastonia Plant and advanced to become the Personnel Manager for the Domestics Division in Greensboro, North Carolina, until his retirement in the mid-1980s.

== Death ==
Davis died on August 31, 2001, from complications of stomach cancer, at the age of 82.
