= Ayden, North Carolina =

- Town
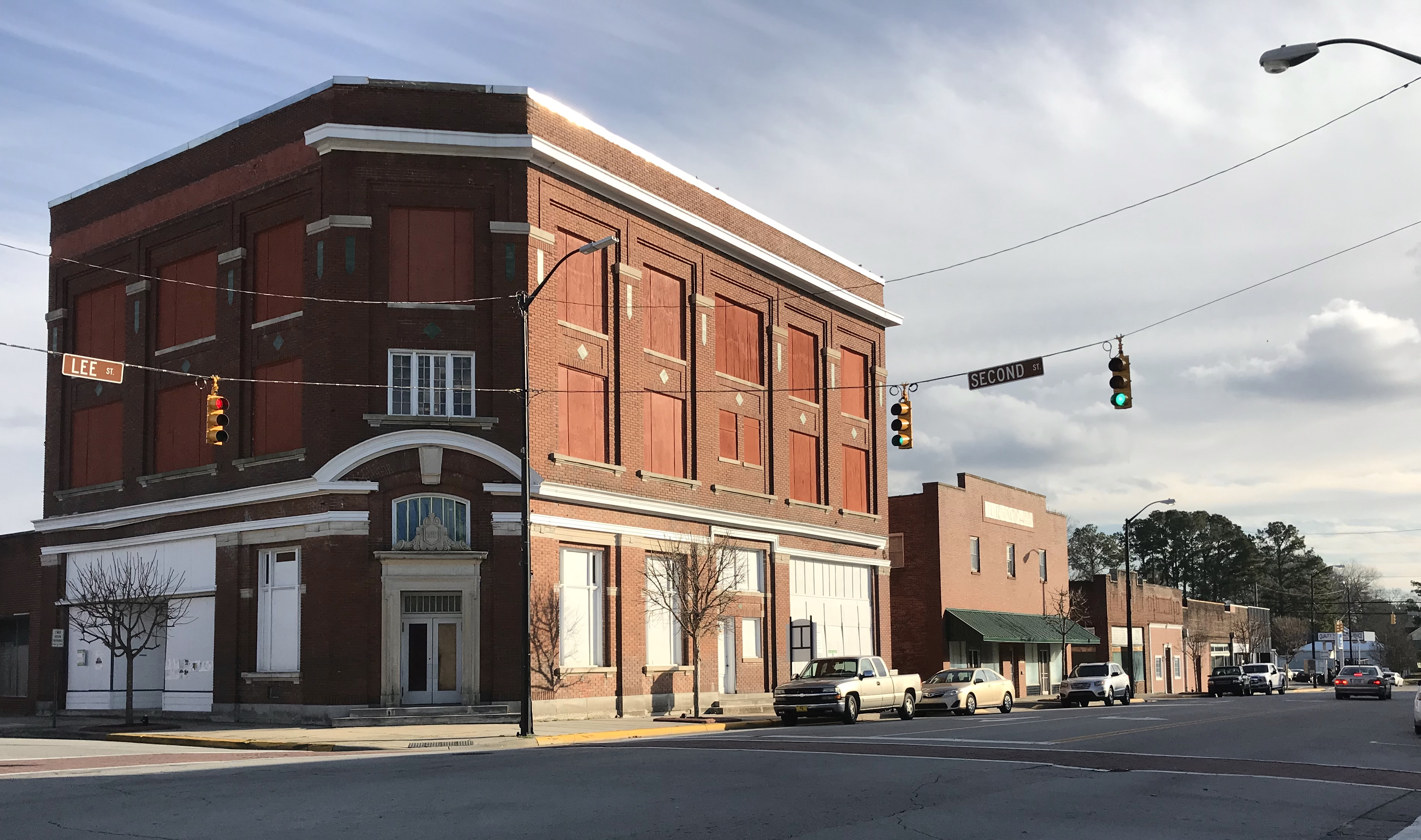
- Lee Street in Ayden

- Flag Seal
- Motto: "A great place to visit, a better place to live." "A vibrant community with hometown charm"
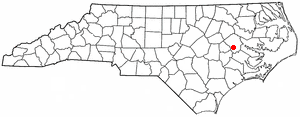
- Location of Ayden, North Carolina
- Coordinates: 35°28′10″N 77°25′00″W
- Country: United States
- State: North Carolina
- County: Pitt

Government
  - Mayor: Ivory Mewborn

Area
  - Total: 3.81 sq mi (9.88 km^{2})
  - Land: 3.81 sq mi (9.88 km^{2})
  - Water: 0 sq mi (0.00 km^{2})
- Elevation: 59 ft (18 m)

Population (2020)
  - Total: 4,977
  - Density: 1,304.9/sq mi (503.83/km^{2})
- Time zone: UTC-5 (Eastern (EST))
  - Summer (DST): UTC-4 (EDT)
- ZIP code: 28513
- Area code: 252
- FIPS code: 37-02840
- GNIS feature ID: 2405193
- Website: https://www.ayden.com/

Ayden is a town in Pitt County, North Carolina, United States. The population was 4,977 at the 2020 census. The town is a part of the Greenville Metropolitan Area of North Carolina's Inner Banks region.

Ayden has a total area of 3.84 square miles, all of which is land.

== History ==
In 1891, William Henry Harris asked the Atlantic Coast Line Railroad to build a railroad depot on a portion of his farm in order to create a village. A 40-acre (160,000 m^{2}) parcel of land was divided into residential lots surrounding the depot in "Harristown", with Harris owning every other lot. Within the next several years, lots were sold and homes built. Businesses began to open up to support the new residents, and on February 3, 1891, the town was incorporated as "Ayden." Within a few years, the Carolina Christian College and the Free Will Baptist Seminary were established. By 1919, Ayden had full-time electricity supplied by the Ayden municipal light plant. In 1922, the Mutual Building and Loan Association of Ayden was organized to help families obtain mortgages to build homes in Ayden.

After experiencing difficult times during the Great Depression, and after the Second World War, the town began to grow. To accommodate the growth, commercial, cultural, religious, and other establishments were opened within and around Ayden. The community is still growing today, due to the continued development of Greenville as an industrial and economic center for eastern North Carolina.

The Ayden Historic District was listed on the National Register of Historic Places in 1994.

== Demographics ==
Historical population
Census	Pop.	Note	%±
1900	557		—
1910	990		77.7%
1920	1,673		69.0%
1930	1,607		−3.9%
1940	1,884		17.2%
1950	2,282		21.1%
1960	3,108		36.2%
1970	3,450		11.0%
1980	4,361		26.4%
1990	4,740		8.7%
2000	4,622		−2.5%
2010	4,932		6.7%
2020	4,977		0.9%
U.S. Decennial Census

=== 2020 census ===
Ayden racial composition
Race	Number	Percentage
White (non-Hispanic)	2,618	52.6%
Black or African American (non-Hispanic)	1,832	36.8%
Native American	20	0.4%
Asian	85	1.7%
Two or More Races	245	4.9%
Hispanic or Latino	483	9.7%

As of the 2020 census, Ayden had a population of 4,977. The median age was 42.1 years. 23.9% of residents were under the age of 18 and 21.3% of residents were 65 years of age or older. For every 100 females there were 80.1 males, and for every 100 females age 18 and over there were 73.9 males age 18 and over.

96.6% of residents lived in urban areas, while 3.4% lived in rural areas.

There were 2,206 households in Ayden, of which 31.2% had children under the age of 18 living in them. Of all households, 32.1% were married-couple households, 16.7% were households with a male householder and no spouse or partner present, and 44.9% were households with a female householder and no spouse or partner present. About 35.7% of all households were made up of individuals and 17.9% had someone living alone who was 65 years of age or older.

There were 2,516 housing units, of which 12.3% were vacant. The homeowner vacancy rate was 2.6% and the rental vacancy rate was 6.8%. As of the 2020 census, there were 1,230 families residing in the town.

=== 2000 census ===
As of the census of 2000, there were 4,622 people, 1,936 households, and 1,217 families residing in the town. The population density was 1,994.5 inhabitants per square mile (770.1/km^{2}). There were 2,067 housing units at an average density of 892.0 per square mile (344.4/km^{2}). The racial makeup of the town was 47.64% White, 49.52% African American, 0.17% Native American, 0.19% Asian, 0.04% Pacific Islander, 1.32% from other races, and 1.10% from two or more races. Hispanic or Latino of any race were 2.21% of the population.

There were 1,936 households, out of which 7.6% had children under the age of 18 living with them, 12% had children under the age of 18 living with them, 8% had children under the age of 18 living with them, 38.4% were married couples living together, 20.3% had a female householder with no husband present, and 12.6% were non-families. 33.1% of all households were made up of individuals, and 17.8% had someone living alone who was 65 years of age or older. The average household size was 2.36 and the average family size was 3.02.

In the town, the population was spread out, with 25.6% under the age of 18, 7.4% from 18 to 24, 25.8% from 25 to 44, 23.4% from 45 to 64, 17.7% who were 65 years of age or older. For every 100 females, there were 78.9 males. For every 100 females aged 18 and over, there were 70.3 males.

The median income for a household in the town was $24,004, and the median income for a family was $34,808. Males had a median income of $30,991 versus $22,305 for females. The per capita income for the town was $14,505. About 21.0% of families and 26.3% of the population were below the poverty line, including 32.4% of those under age 18 and 34.1% of those age 65 or over.

== Government structure ==
Ayden has used the council-manager form of government since 1957. Under this form of government, the Town Board of Commissioners is the final authority of most matters related to managing the government. The Town Board employs a Town Manager to oversee the day-to-day operations of the town. The mayor acts as the official head of the government and spokesperson of the Board. The mayor presides at all meetings of the Board and signs all documents authorized by the Board.

The Mayor Pro-Tem is selected by each new board and assumes all duties and responsibilities of the mayor in their absence. The mayor and Town Board, together, are responsible for establishing the policies for the general operation of the town. The Town Board adopts ordinances, resolutions, budgets, authorizes contracts, and approves the financing of all town operations. The Board also appoints the Town Manager and Town Attorney, along with members of various boards and commissions.

== Education ==
Education in Ayden is administered by the Pitt County Schools System. The three schools located in Ayden include Ayden Elementary School (AES), Ayden Middle School, and Ayden-Grifton High School. Higher education is provided by Pitt Community College, located between Ayden and Greenville. East Carolina University is located in downtown Greenville.

== Local events ==
The Ayden Collard Festival is held the week immediately following Labor Day in September. The annual event started in 1975 and includes a Collard Queen contest which has been renamed as the Miss Ayden contest, sporting events, rides, live music, food, and a parade.

== Notable people ==
- Eric Blount, gridiron football player
- Demetrius Edwards a.k.a. "Oak Tree", boxer and kickboxer
- Loonis McGlohon, jazz musician
- Lawrence Quincy Mumford, Librarian of Congress
- Timothy Reeder, physician and politician in the North Carolina House of Representatives
