= Ayden Historic District =

Historic district in North Carolina, United States

- U.S. National Register of Historic Places
- U.S. Historic district
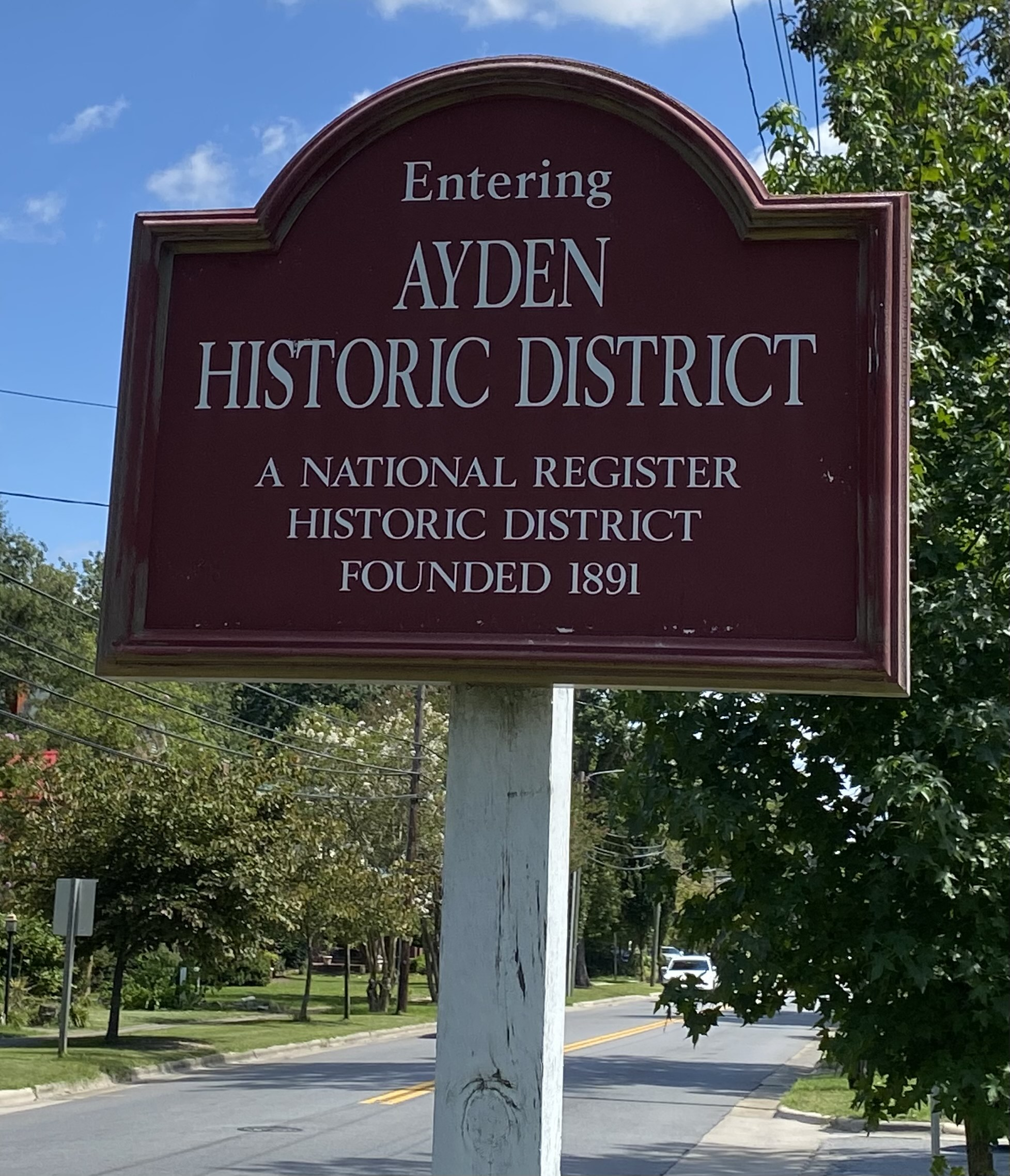

- Location within North Carolina Location within the United States
- Location: Roughly bounded by Verna St., Peachtree St., E. College St. and Planters St., Ayden, North Carolina
- Coordinates: 35°28′09″N 77°25′13″W
- Area: 146 acres (59 ha)
- Built: 1890
- Architect: Benton & Benton Associates; Wilburn, Leila Ross
- Architectural style: Bungalow/Craftsman, Late 19th and 20th Century Revivals, Late Victorian
- NRHP reference No.: 94001026
- Added to NRHP: August 26, 1994

The Ayden Historic District is a national historic district located at Ayden, Pitt County, North Carolina. The 146-acre (59 ha) district encompasses 319 contributing buildings and six contributing structures in the town of Ayden. It includes buildings dated from the late-19th to mid-20th century and notable examples of Bungalow / American Craftsman, Colonial Revival, and Queen Anne architecture. Notable buildings include the original Ayden Town Hall (1915), Turnage Brothers Building (c. 1914), Moore House (c. 1890), John Stanley Hart House (c. 1893), Thelbert Worthington House (1930) designed by Leila Ross Wilburn, Ayden Baptist Church (1941), the Lloyd and Lillian Turnage House (1923) and Ayden Methodist Church (1926) designed by Benton & Benton Associates, Zion Chapel Free Will Baptist Church (1924), and Mount Olive Baptist Church (c. 1915).

Turnage Bros. was a farm equipment business.

It was listed on the National Register of Historic Places in 1994.
