= Historic Churches of Canon Historic District =

Historic district in Georgia, United States

- U.S. National Register of Historic Places
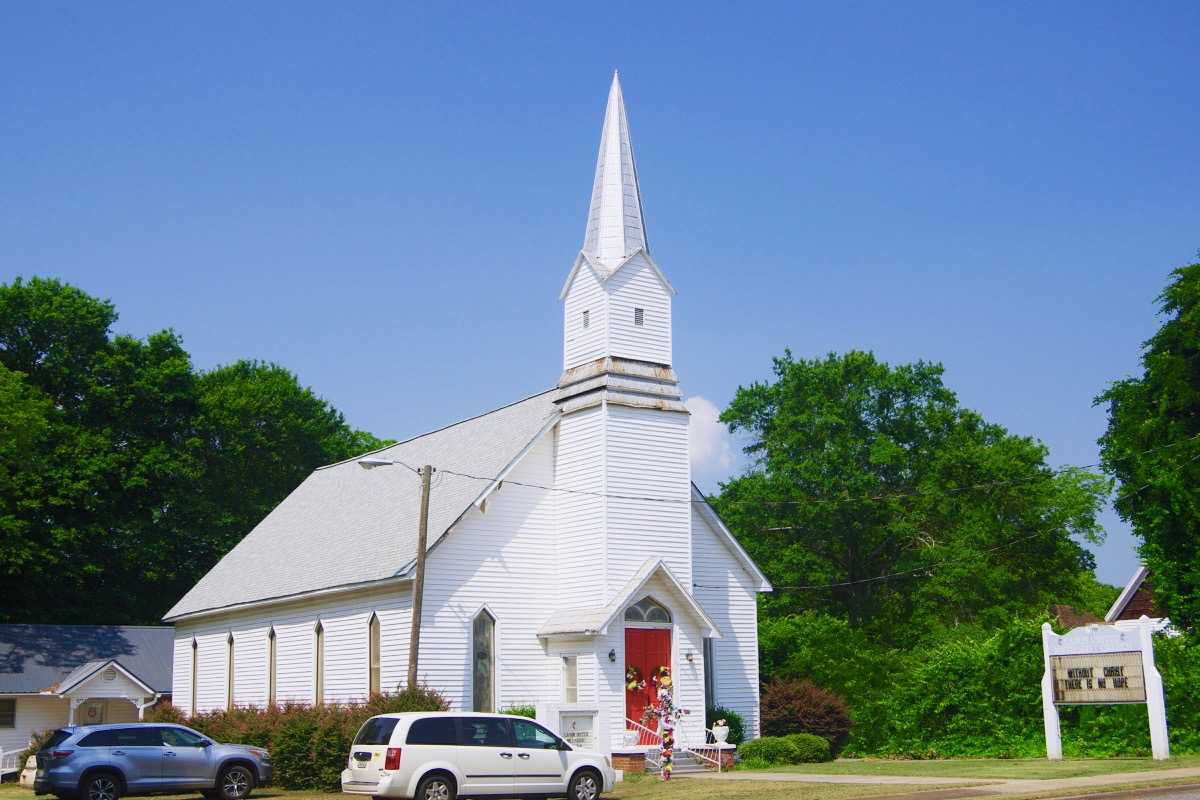

- Location within Georgia
- Location: Broad St. at Canon Ave., Canon, Georgia
- Coordinates: 34°20′41″N 83°06′35″W
- Area: 2 acres (0.81 ha)
- Architect: Fleming, James
- Architectural style: Gothic Revival
- NRHP reference No.: 85001680
- Added to NRHP: August 1, 1985

The Historic Churches of Canon Historic District in Canon, Georgia is a historic district, 2 acres (0.81 ha) in size, which was listed on the National Register of Historic Places in 1985. The listing included three contributing buildings.

It covers three wood-framed churches: Canon Baptist Church, Canon Universalist Church, and Canon Methodist Church.

== See also ==
- Canon Commercial Historic District
