= Jones Street Residential Historic District =

Historic district in Georgia, United States

- U.S. National Register of Historic Places
- Location within Georgia
- Location: Jones, Baker, and Old Carnesville Rd., Lavonia, Georgia
- Coordinates: 34°26′16″N 83°06′32″W
- Area: 9 acres (3.6 ha)
- Architectural style: Classical Revival, Late Victorian, Plantation Plain
- MPS: Lavonia MRA
- NRHP reference No.: 83000207
- Added to NRHP: September 1, 1983

The Jones Street Residential Historic District in Lavonia, Georgia, is a 9 acres (3.6 ha) historic district which was listed on the National Register of Historic Places in 1983. The listing included 14 contributing buildings, all residences.
