= Vickery Street Historic District =

Historic district in Georgia, United States

- U.S. National Register of Historic Places
- Location within Georgia
- Location: Vickery St., Lavonia, Georgia
- Coordinates: 34°26′28″N 83°06′23″W
- Area: 23 acres (9.3 ha)
- Architectural style: Mixed (more than two styles from different periods)
- MPS: Lavonia MRA
- NRHP reference No.: 83000224
- Added to NRHP: September 1, 1983

The Vickery Street Historic District in Lavonia, Georgia is a 23 acres (9.3 ha) historic district which was listed on the National Register of Historic Places in 1983. The listing included 34 contributing buildings.

It includes about four blocks on both sides of Vickery Street and one building on Thomas Street, mostly single-family wood-framed houses. Also included are two churches, one commercial building, and a house built of decorative concrete blocks. The most elaborate is the Queen Anne-style Knox-Maret-Tribble-Roberts Residence, at Vickery and Rainbow Drive. It has a three-story tower with fish-scale shingles and a conical roof, bargeboards, and a porch with decorative elements.
