= Vickery-Baylies House =

Historic house in Massachusetts, United States

- U.S. National Register of Historic Places
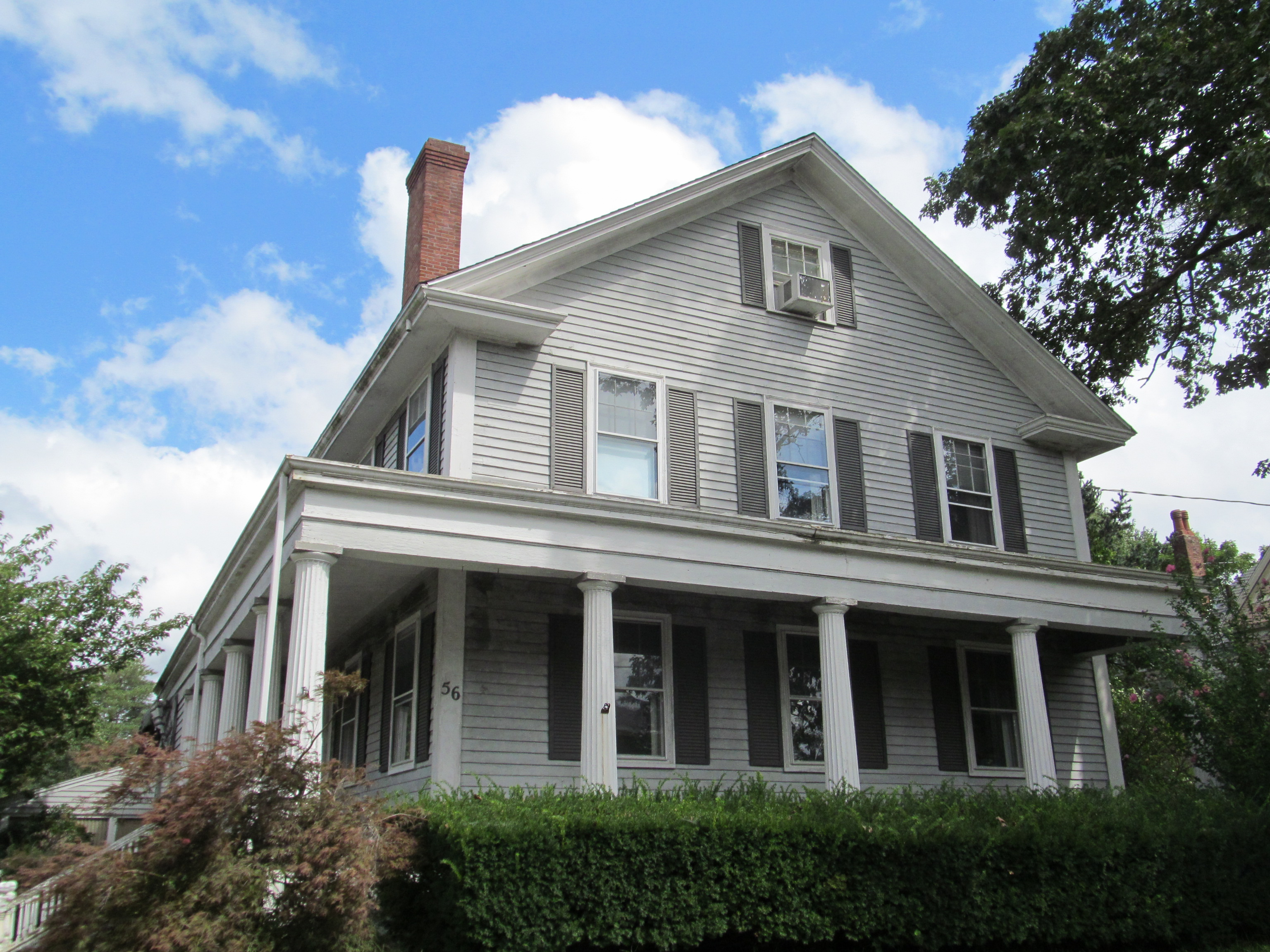
- Vickery-Baylies House, September 2012

- Location within Massachusetts Location within the United States
- Location: 56 Summer St., Taunton, Massachusetts
- Coordinates: 41°53′59″N 71°5′15″W
- Built: 1830
- Architectural style: Greek Revival
- MPS: Taunton MRA
- NRHP reference No.: 84002252
- Added to NRHP: July 5, 1984

The Vickery-Baylies House is a historic house located at 56 Summer Street in Taunton, Massachusetts.

== Description and history ==
The 2 1/2-story, wood-framed house was built in 1830, most likely by one of the city's local mill owners. The house is one of only two large-scale Greek Revival houses (the other is the Tisdale-Morse House) to survive from that period. Charles Vickery, whose family owned it for much of the second half of the 19th century, was the son of a ship's captain, and a merchant and banker in the city.

The house was listed on the National Register of Historic Places on July 5, 1984.

== See also ==
- National Register of Historic Places listings in Taunton, Massachusetts
