= Bellamy Historic District =

Historic district in Georgia, United States

- U.S. National Register of Historic Places
- Location within Georgia
- Nearest city: Carnesville, Georgia
- Coordinates: 34°22′17″N 83°21′55″W
- Area: 200 acres (81 ha)
- Architectural style: Queen Anne, double pen
- MPS: Old Federal Road in Georgia's Banks and Franklin Counties MPS
- NRHP reference No.: 96001304
- Added to NRHP: November 7, 1996

The Bellamy Historic District, in Franklin County, Georgia near Carnesville, Georgia, is located on GA 51, approximately 2.75 mi. NW of junction with I-85. It is a 200 acres (81 ha) historic district which was listed on the National Register of Historic Places in 1996. The listing included 14 contributing buildings.

It includes double pen architecture and Queen Anne architecture.

It includes the Richard Bellamy Log House, built c. 1800, a clapboard-covered one-story log house which is about 26 by 18 feet (7.9 m × 5.5 m) in plan.
