= Royston Commercial Historic District =

- U.S. National Register of Historic Places
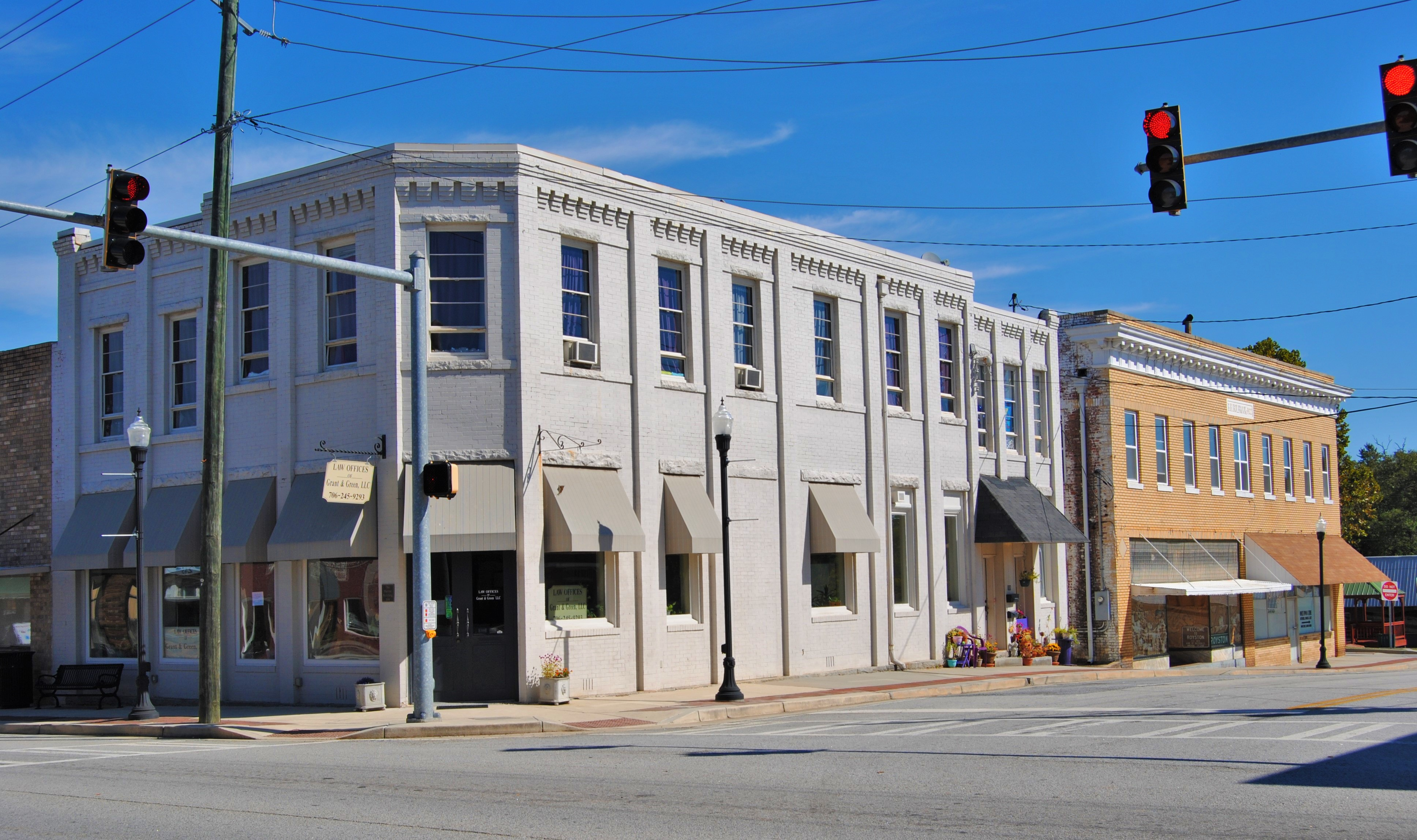

- Location within Georgia
- Location: Along Church and Railroad Sts., Royston, Georgia
- Coordinates: 34°17′12″N 83°06′37″W
- Area: 6 acres (2.4 ha)
- Built by: Multiple
- Architectural style: Chicago, Late Victorian, Commercial
- NRHP reference No.: 85001969
- Added to NRHP: September 5, 1985

The Royston Commercial Historic District is a historic district in Royston, Georgia which was listed on the National Register of Historic Places in 1985.

The 6 acres (2.4 ha) listed area included 33 contributing buildings, which are mostly one- and two-story brick commercial structures with party walls.

It runs between north-south Church Street on the west and the Southern Railroad tracks on the east.

Among the most distinctive are the "Dorough Building (Carter Hardware), an extremely intact late Victorian structure with a fine corbeled cornice, an intact metal storefront, and a completely intact interior including a pressed metal ceiling and the P.C. Scarboro Building, a finely-detailed, early Ford dealership with a tiled pent roof supported by prominent brackets."
