= Canon Commercial Historic District =

Historic district in Georgia, United States

- U.S. National Register of Historic Places
- U.S. Historic district
- Location within Georgia
- Location: Depot St. between Bond Ave. & Broad St., Canon, Georgia
- Nearest city: Athens, Georgia
- Coordinates: 34°20′46″N 83°06′36″W
- Area: 4.5 acres (1.8 ha)
- Built: 1879
- Built by: Bowers, W.F.; Bowers, Job
- Architectural style: Colonial Revival, Greek Revival, Georgian Revival
- NRHP reference No.: 85001681
- Designated HD: August 1, 1985

The Canon Commercial Historic District in Canon, Georgia is a 4.5 acres (1.8 ha) historic district which was listed on the National Register of Historic Places in 1985. The listing included eight contributing buildings.

It includes the Canon Hotel, a two-story Georgian Revival-style building. and the W.F. Bowers Building, a one-story brick building built in the early 1890s, which, in 1985, had a "deteriorated Greek Revival-style porch at the Depot Street level that is supported by square brick columns. The central portal has a glass transom and a segmental arch and is flanked by a window on each side and four square brick wall pilasters. The porch has square wood columns and a wooden balustrade supported by square brick pillars."

== See also ==
- Historic Churches of Canon Historic District
