= Kidd House (Lavonia, Georgia) =

Historic house in Georgia, United States

- U.S. National Register of Historic Places
- Location within Georgia Location within the United States
- Location: 222 Hartwell Rd., Lavonia, Georgia
- Coordinates: 34°25′56″N 83°6′0″W
- Area: 4 acres (1.6 ha)
- Built: 1919
- Architect: Wilburn, Leila Ross
- Architectural style: Bungalow/Craftsman
- MPS: Lavonia MRA
- NRHP reference No.: 83000209
- Added to NRHP: September 1, 1983

The Kidd House in Lavonia, Georgia, also known as Kidd Residence, was built in 1919. It is a 1 1/2-story bungalow house with Craftsman interior details. It was designed by architect Leila Ross Wilburn.

In a survey of historic resources in Lavonia, the house with its pecan grove were found to be significant architecturally "as one of the most elaborate examples of Craftsman/Bungalow design" in the area, and also as an example of a small farmstead in the city, and also for its association with C.A. Kidd, Sr.

It was listed on the National Register of Historic Places in 1983.
