= McConnell Historic District =

Historic district in Georgia, United States

- U.S. National Register of Historic Places
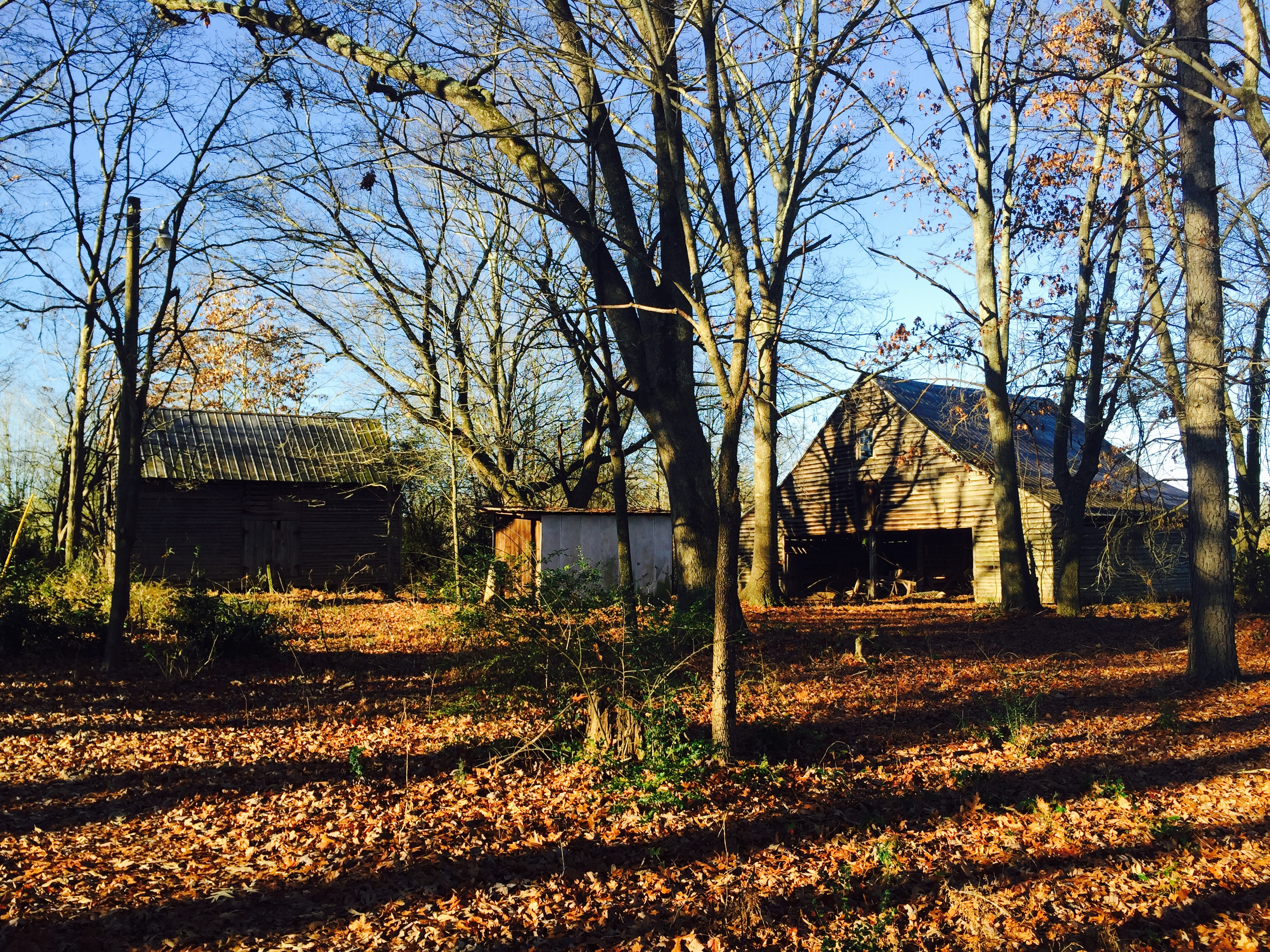
- Outbuildings in the district

- Location within Georgia
- Nearest city: Carnesville, Georgia
- Coordinates: 34°22′00″N 83°21′13″W
- Area: 125 acres (51 ha)
- Built: 1880
- Architectural style: Double pen
- MPS: Old Federal Road in Georgia's Banks and Franklin Counties MPS
- NRHP reference No.: 96001299
- Added to NRHP: November 7, 1996

The McConnell Historic District, in Franklin County, Georgia near Carnesville, Georgia, is a rural crossroads community located on GA 51, approximately 2.5 mi. northwest of its junction with I-85. It is a 125 acres (51 ha) historic district which was listed on the National Register of Historic Places in 1996. The listing included 30 contributing buildings and two contributing structures.

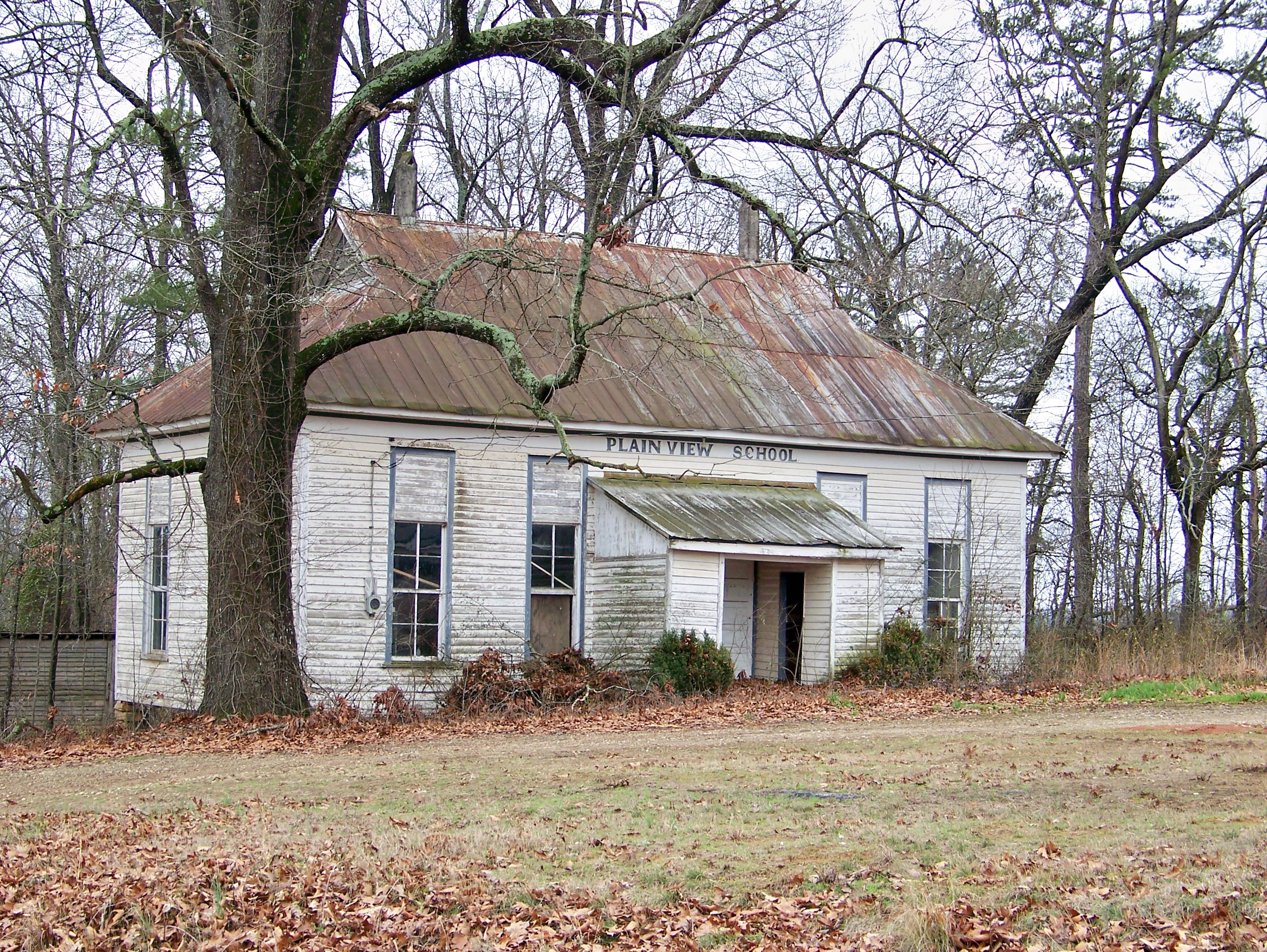
Plainview School

It includes the Plain View School and the McConnell-Richardson-Bellamy House.
