= Vickery House (Lavonia, Georgia) =

- U.S. National Register of Historic Places
- Location within Georgia
- Location: Grogan St., Lavonia, Georgia
- Coordinates: 34°26′10″N 83°06′15″W
- Area: less than one acre
- Built: c.1900
- MPS: Lavonia MRA
- NRHP reference No.: 83000223
- Added to NRHP: September 1, 1983

The Vickery House in Lavonia, Georgia, also known as the Shirley House, is a historic house built around 1900–1905. It was listed on the National Register of Historic Places in 1983.

It was built for C.W. Vickery, a merchant and the founder of the Vickery Bank.
