= West Avenue – Roberts Street Residential Historic District =

Historic district in Georgia, United States

- U.S. National Register of Historic Places
- Location within Georgia
- Location: Between Mason and Jones Sts., Lavonia, Georgia
- Coordinates: 34°26′05″N 83°06′36″W
- Area: 20 acres (8.1 ha)
- Architect: Wilburn, Leila Ross; Multiple
- Architectural style: Bungalow/craftsman, Late Victorian
- MPS: Lavonia MRA
- NRHP reference No.: 83000225
- Added to NRHP: September 1, 1983

The West Avenue – Roberts Street Residential Historic District in Lavonia, Georgia is a 20 acres (8.1 ha) historic district which was listed on the National Register of Historic Places in 1983. The listing included 23 contributing buildings (houses) and a contributing site (a city park).

The houses are mostly brick Craftsman bungalows or wood-frame Victorian cottages. The Judge Allen house at the corner of Roberts Street and Augusta Road, a one-a-half-story house, is one of the most distinguished. It has multiple gables, with dentil molding in the front gable, and fanlight windows.
