= North Carolina's 7th House district =

American legislative district

North Carolina's 7th State House of Representatives district
Representative
Matthew Winslow; R–Youngsville
- Demographics: 59% White; 24% Black; 11% Hispanic; 1% Asian; 4% Multiracial
- Population (2024): 89,390

North Carolina's 7th House district is one of 120 districts in the North Carolina House of Representatives. It has been represented by Republican Matthew Winslow since 2021.

== Geography ==
Since 2025, the district has included all of Franklin County, as well as part of Vance County. The district overlaps with the 11th Senate district.

== District officeholders ==
=== Multi-member district ===
Representative	Party	Dates	Notes	Representative	Party	Dates	Notes	Representative	Party	Dates	Notes	Representative	Party	Dates	Notes	Counties
District created January 1, 1967.
Thorne Gregory (Scotland Neck)	Democratic	January 1, 1967 – January 1, 1971	Redistricted from the Halifax County district.	J. A. Everett (Palmyra)	Democratic	January 1, 1967 – January 1, 1973	Redistricted to the 6th district.									1967–1973; All of Halifax and Martin counties.
C. Kitchin Josey (Scotland Neck)	Democratic	January 1, 1971 – January 1, 1973	Redistricted to the 6th district.	J. A. Everett (Palmyra)	Democratic	January 1, 1967 – January 1, 1973	Redistricted to the 6th district.									1967–1973; All of Halifax and Martin counties.
Julian Fenner (Rocky Mount)	Democratic	January 1, 1973 – January 1, 1975	Redistricted from the 14th district.	John Edwin Davenport (Nashville)	Democratic	January 1, 1973 – January 1, 1979		Larry Eagles (Tarboro)	Democratic	January 1, 1973 – January 1, 1977	Redistricted from the 14th district.	A. Hartwell Campbell (Wilson)	Democratic	January 1, 1973 – June 30, 1979	Resigned to accept appointment to the North Carolina Utilities Commission.	1973–1983; All of Nash, Edgecombe, and Wilson counties.
Allen Barbee (Spring Hope)	Democratic	January 1, 1975 – January 1, 1983	Redistricted to the 8th district.	John Edwin Davenport (Nashville)	Democratic	January 1, 1973 – January 1, 1979		Larry Eagles (Tarboro)	Democratic	January 1, 1973 – January 1, 1977	Redistricted from the 14th district.	A. Hartwell Campbell (Wilson)	Democratic	January 1, 1973 – June 30, 1979	Resigned to accept appointment to the North Carolina Utilities Commission.	1973–1983; All of Nash, Edgecombe, and Wilson counties.
Allen Barbee (Spring Hope)	Democratic	January 1, 1975 – January 1, 1983	Redistricted to the 8th district.	John Edwin Davenport (Nashville)	Democratic	January 1, 1973 – January 1, 1979		Jim Ezzell (Rocky Mount)	Democratic	January 1, 1977 – January 1, 1981		A. Hartwell Campbell (Wilson)	Democratic	January 1, 1973 – June 30, 1979	Resigned to accept appointment to the North Carolina Utilities Commission.	1973–1983; All of Nash, Edgecombe, and Wilson counties.
Allen Barbee (Spring Hope)	Democratic	January 1, 1975 – January 1, 1983	Redistricted to the 8th district.	Roger Bone (Rocky Mount)	Democratic	January 1, 1979 – January 1, 1983	Redistricted to the 8th district.	Jim Ezzell (Rocky Mount)	Democratic	January 1, 1977 – January 1, 1981		A. Hartwell Campbell (Wilson)	Democratic	January 1, 1973 – June 30, 1979	Resigned to accept appointment to the North Carolina Utilities Commission.	1973–1983; All of Nash, Edgecombe, and Wilson counties.
Allen Barbee (Spring Hope)	Democratic	January 1, 1975 – January 1, 1983	Redistricted to the 8th district.	Roger Bone (Rocky Mount)	Democratic	January 1, 1979 – January 1, 1983	Redistricted to the 8th district.	Jim Ezzell (Rocky Mount)	Democratic	January 1, 1977 – January 1, 1981		Vacant		June 30, 1979 – May 20, 1980		1973–1983; All of Nash, Edgecombe, and Wilson counties.
Allen Barbee (Spring Hope)	Democratic	January 1, 1975 – January 1, 1983	Redistricted to the 8th district.	Roger Bone (Rocky Mount)	Democratic	January 1, 1979 – January 1, 1983	Redistricted to the 8th district.	Jim Ezzell (Rocky Mount)	Democratic	January 1, 1977 – January 1, 1981		Jeanne Fenner (Wilson)	Democratic	May 20, 1980 – January 1, 1983	Appointed to finish Hartwell's term. Redistricted to the 8th district.	1973–1983; All of Nash, Edgecombe, and Wilson counties.
Allen Barbee (Spring Hope)	Democratic	January 1, 1975 – January 1, 1983	Redistricted to the 8th district.	Roger Bone (Rocky Mount)	Democratic	January 1, 1979 – January 1, 1983	Redistricted to the 8th district.	Josephus Mavretic (Tarboro)	Democratic	January 1, 1981 – January 1, 1983	Redistricted to the 8th district.	Jeanne Fenner (Wilson)	Democratic	May 20, 1980 – January 1, 1983	Appointed to finish Hartwell's term. Redistricted to the 8th district.	1973–1983; All of Nash, Edgecombe, and Wilson counties.

=== Single-member district ===
Representative	Party	Dates	Notes	Counties
Frank Ballance (Warrenton)	Democratic	January 1, 1983 – January 1, 1987	Retired.	1983–1993; Parts of Warren, Halifax, and Martin counties.
Thomas Hardaway (Enfield)	Democratic	January 1, 1987 – January 1, 1993	Retired.	1983–1993; Parts of Warren, Halifax, and Martin counties.
Dock Brown (Weldon)	Democratic	January 1, 1993 – January 1, 1995	Retired.	1993–2003; Parts of Nash, Edgecombe, Halifax, and Martin Counties.
L. W. Locke (Halifax)	Democratic	January 1, 1995 – January 1, 1997	Retired.	1993–2003; Parts of Nash, Edgecombe, Halifax, and Martin Counties.
Thomas Hardaway (Enfield)	Democratic	January 1, 1997 – January 15, 2000	Resigned.	1993–2003; Parts of Nash, Edgecombe, Halifax, and Martin Counties.
Vacant		January 15, 2000 – February 4, 2000		1993–2003; Parts of Nash, Edgecombe, Halifax, and Martin Counties.
John Hall (Scotland Neck)	Democratic	February 4, 2000 – March 17, 2005	Appointed to finish Hardaway's term. Died.	1993–2003; Parts of Nash, Edgecombe, Halifax, and Martin Counties.
John Hall (Scotland Neck)	Democratic	February 4, 2000 – March 17, 2005	Appointed to finish Hardaway's term. Died.	2003–2013; Parts of Nash and Halifax counties.
Vacant		March 17, 2005 – April 5, 2005		2003–2013; Parts of Nash and Halifax counties.
Ed Jones (Enfield)	Democratic	April 5, 2005 – January 23, 2007	Appointed to finish Hall's term. Resigned to accept appointment to the State Senate.	2003–2013; Parts of Nash and Halifax counties.
Vacant		January 23, 2007 – January 24, 2007		2003–2013; Parts of Nash and Halifax counties.
Angela Bryant (Rocky Mount)	Democratic	January 24, 2007 – January 4, 2013	Appointed to finish Jones' term. Resigned to accept appointment to the State Senate.	2003–2013; Parts of Nash and Halifax counties.
Angela Bryant (Rocky Mount)	Democratic	January 24, 2007 – January 4, 2013	Appointed to finish Jones' term. Resigned to accept appointment to the State Senate.	2013–2019; Parts of Franklin and Nash counties.
Vacant		January 4, 2013 – January 9, 2013		2013–2019; Parts of Franklin and Nash counties.
Bobbie Richardson (Wood)	Democratic	January 9, 2013 – January 1, 2019	Appointed to finish Bryant's term. Lost re-election.	2013–2019; Parts of Franklin and Nash counties.
Lisa Stone Barnes (Spring Hope)	Republican	January 1, 2019 – January 1, 2021	Retired to run for State Senate.	2019–2023; All of Franklin County. Part of Nash County.
Matthew Winslow (Youngsville)	Republican	January 1, 2021 – Present	Retiring.	2019–2023; All of Franklin County. Part of Nash County.
Matthew Winslow (Youngsville)	Republican	January 1, 2021 – Present	Retiring.	2023–2025; All of Franklin County. Part of Granville County.
Matthew Winslow (Youngsville)	Republican	January 1, 2021 – Present	Retiring.	2025–Present; All of Franklin County. Part of Vance County.

== Election results ==
=== 2024 ===
North Carolina House of Representatives 7th district general election, 2024
Party	Candidate	Votes	%
Republican	Matthew Winslow (incumbent)	27,099	55.32%
Democratic	Jesse Goslen	20,655	42.17%
Libertarian	Gavin Bell	1,231	2.51%
Total votes		48,985	100%
Republican hold			

=== 2022 ===
North Carolina House of Representatives 7th district general election, 2022
Party	Candidate	Votes	%
Republican	Matthew Winslow (incumbent)	24,137	100%
Total votes		24,137	100%
Republican hold			

=== 2020 ===
North Carolina House of Representatives 7th district general election, 2020
Party	Candidate	Votes	%
Republican	Matthew Winslow	26,166	58.97%
Democratic	Phil Stover	18,208	41.03%
Total votes		44,374	100%
Republican hold			

=== 2018 ===
North Carolina House of Representatives 7th district Republican primary election, 2018
Party	Candidate	Votes	%
Republican	Lisa Stone Barnes	2,203	70.54%
Republican	Glen Bradley	920	29.46%
Total votes		3,123	100%

North Carolina House of Representatives 7th district general election, 2018
Party	Candidate	Votes	%
Republican	Lisa Stone Barnes	18,352	58.00%
Democratic	Bobbie Richardson (incumbent)	13,289	42.00%
Total votes		31,641	100%
Republican gain from Democratic			

=== 2016 ===
North Carolina House of Representatives 7th district general election, 2016
Party	Candidate	Votes	%
Democratic	Bobbie Richardson (incumbent)	23,329	67.81%
Republican	William Duke Hancock II	11,072	32.19%
Total votes		34,401	100%
Democratic hold			

=== 2014 ===
North Carolina House of Representatives 7th district general election, 2014
Party	Candidate	Votes	%
Democratic	Bobbie Richardson (incumbent)	18,628	100%
Total votes		18,628	100%
Democratic hold			

=== 2012 ===
North Carolina House of Representatives 7th district Democratic primary election, 2012
Party	Candidate	Votes	%
Democratic	Angela Bryant (incumbent)	9,417	83.51%
Democratic	William Duke Hancock II	1,859	16.49%
Total votes		11,276	100%

North Carolina House of Representatives 7th district general election, 2012
Party	Candidate	Votes	%
Democratic	Angela Bryant (incumbent)	27,761	100%
Total votes		27,761	100%
Democratic hold			

=== 2010 ===
North Carolina House of Representatives 7th district general election, 2010
Party	Candidate	Votes	%
Democratic	Angela Bryant (incumbent)	12,544	100%
Total votes		12,544	100%
Democratic hold			

=== 2008 ===
North Carolina House of Representatives 7th district Democratic primary election, 2008
Party	Candidate	Votes	%
Democratic	Angela Bryant (incumbent)	10,928	76.29%
Democratic	Jean Reaves	3,396	23.71%
Total votes		14,324	100%

North Carolina House of Representatives 7th district general election, 2008
Party	Candidate	Votes	%
Democratic	Angela Bryant (incumbent)	22,928	100%
Total votes		22,928	100%
Democratic hold			

=== 2006 ===
North Carolina House of Representatives 7th district general election, 2006
Party	Candidate	Votes	%
Democratic	Ed Jones (incumbent)	7,264	100%
Total votes		7,264	100%
Democratic hold			

=== 2004 ===
North Carolina House of Representatives 7th district general election, 2004
Party	Candidate	Votes	%
Democratic	John Hall (incumbent)	17,714	100%
Total votes		17,714	100%
Democratic hold			

=== 2002 ===
North Carolina House of Representatives 7th district Democratic primary election, 2002
Party	Candidate	Votes	%
Democratic	John Hall (incumbent)	5,596	68.34%
Democratic	Bryan S. Franklin	2,593	31.66%
Total votes		8,189	100%

North Carolina House of Representatives 7th district general election, 2002
Party	Candidate	Votes	%
Democratic	John Hall (incumbent)	11,941	100%
Total votes		11,941	100%
Democratic hold			

=== 2000 ===
North Carolina House of Representatives 7th district general election, 2000
Party	Candidate	Votes	%
Democratic	John Hall (incumbent)	14,004	100%
Total votes		14,004	100%
Democratic hold			
