= Allen Barbee =

American politician (1910–2004)

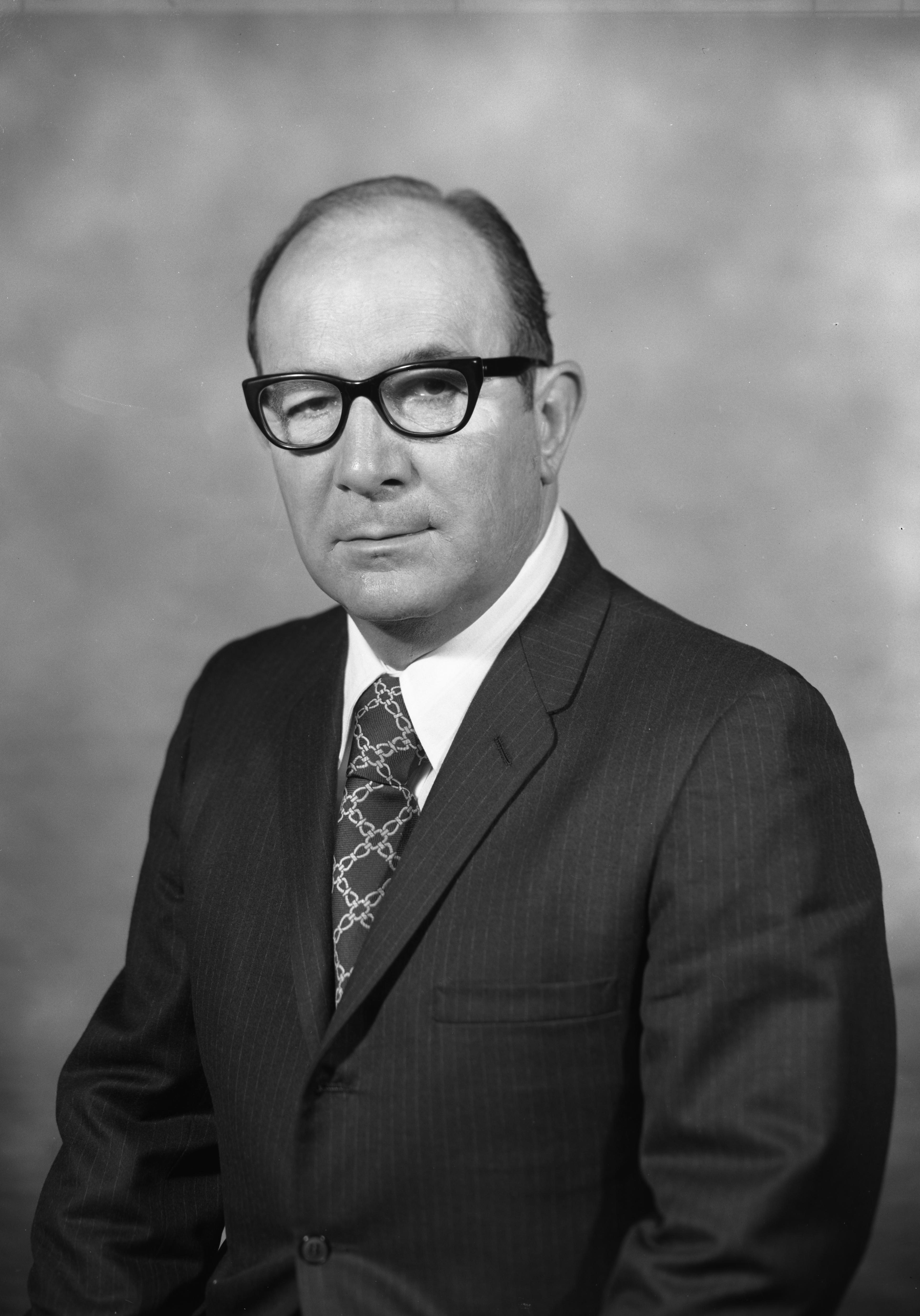
- Official portrait, 1971

Member of the North Carolina House of Representatives
- In office 1975–1987
- Preceded by: Julian B. Fenner
- Succeeded by: Roy Cooper
- Constituency: 7th district (1975‍–‍1983); 8th district (1983‍–‍1985); 72nd district (1985‍–‍1987)
- In office 1961–1973
- Preceded by: Tim Valentine
- Succeeded by: John Ed Davenport
- Constituency: Nash County (1961‍–‍1967); 14th district (1967‍–‍1973)

Speaker pro tempore of the North Carolina House of Representatives
- In office January 14, 1981 – February 5, 1985
- Speaker: Liston B. Ramsey
- Preceded by: H. Horton Rountree
- Succeeded by: Jack Hunt

Mayor of Spring Hope
- In office 1952–1960
- Preceded by: Theo Easom
- Succeeded by: Jimmy Pearce

Personal details
- Born: Allen Cromwell Barbee; December 18, 1910 Spring Hope, North Carolina, United States
- Died: February 11, 2004 (aged 93) Rocky Mount, North Carolina, United States
- Party: Democratic
- Spouse: Mabel Dixon (m. 1942)
- Alma mater: University of North Carolina
- Occupation: Farmer; businessman; politician

Military service
- Branch/service: United States Army; Army Air Forces
- Years of service: 1942‍–‍1946
- Rank: Captain
- Battles/wars: World War II; European theater

Allen Cromwell Barbee (December 18, 1910 – February 11, 2004) was an American politician.

Barbee was one of eight children born to John Lucian Barbee and Deborah Vester Barbee. He graduated from Spring Hope High School in Spring Hope, North Carolina and received a football scholarship to the University of North Carolina at Chapel Hill. Barbee founded the local newspaper, the Spring Hope Enterprise in 1947. Politically, Barbee was affiliated with the Democratic Party. He was active in municipal politics for nine years as a member of the Spring Hope Town Board and mayor of the town. He won his first election to the North Carolina House of Representatives in November 1960, and left the office to contest the Democratic nomination for the 1972 North Carolina lieutenant gubernatorial election, which went to Jim Hunt. Barbee returned to the state house after winning the 1974 state legislative elections, and served continuously through 1987, when he was defeated by Roy Cooper in the Democratic primary. He died on February 11, 2004, at the age of 93.

North Carolina House of Representatives
Preceded by Tim Valentine	Member of the North Carolina House of Representatives from Nash County; 1961–1967	Succeeded by Constituency abolished
Preceded by Constituency established	Member of the North Carolina House of Representatives from the 14th district 1967–1973; Served alongside: Joseph Elliott Eagles, Julian Baker Fenner, Larry P. Eagles	Succeeded by Jonas Melvin Gardner; Barney Paul Woodard
Preceded by Julian Baker Fenner	Member of the North Carolina House of Representatives from the 7th district 1975–1983; Served alongside: Larry P. Eagles, John Edwin Davenport, Arthur Hartwell Campbell, Jim Ezzell, Roger Wayne Bone, Josephus Mavretic, Jeanne Tucker Fenner	Succeeded by Frank Ballance
Preceded by Sam Bundy; Ed Nelson Warren	Member of the North Carolina House of Representatives from the 8th district 1983–1985; Served alongside: Josephus Mavretic, Thomas Hill Matthews, Jeanne Tucker Fenner	Succeeded by Josephus Mavretic
Preceded by Constituency established	Member of the North Carolina House of Representatives from the 72nd district 1985–1987	Succeeded by Roy Cooper
