= Bobbie Richardson =

American politician

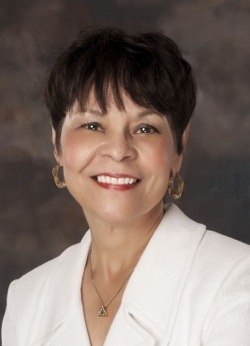

Chair of the North Carolina Democratic Party
- In office February 27, 2021 – February 11, 2023
- Preceded by: Wayne Goodwin
- Succeeded by: Anderson Clayton

Member of the North Carolina House of Representatives from the 7th district
- In office January 9, 2013 – January 1, 2019
- Preceded by: Angela Bryant
- Succeeded by: Lisa Stone Barnes

Personal details
- Born: December 25, 1949 (age 76) Wood, North Carolina, U.S.
- Party: Democratic
- Education: North Carolina Central University (BA, MA); University of North Carolina, Chapel Hill (PhD)

Bobbie J. Richardson (born December 25, 1949) is an American politician. She is the former Chair of the North Carolina Democratic Party, former First Vice Chair of the North Carolina Democratic Party and a former Democratic member of the North Carolina House of Representatives. She was appointed to represent the 7th District (which includes portions of Franklin and Nash counties) in January 2013 after then-state representative Angela Bryant was appointed to complete the unexpired term of late state senator Edward Jones. Richardson is a retired educator and administrator, with 35 years of experience as an educator in North Carolina public schools. She earned her undergraduate and master's degrees from North Carolina Central University in Durham and her doctorate from the University of North Carolina at Chapel Hill. Richardson is African-American.

On November 24, 2020, Richardson announced her candidacy to succeed Wayne Goodwin as the Chair of the North Carolina Democratic Party via social media and email. She was elected on February 27, 2021, becoming the first Black person in that position.

On February 11, 2023, Richardson lost re-election as Chair of the North Carolina Democratic Party to Anderson Clayton, a 25 year old activist from Roxboro, by a margin of 272-223.

North Carolina House of Representatives
Preceded by Angela Bryant	Member of the North Carolina House of Representatives from the 7th district 2013–2019	Succeeded by Lisa Stone Barnes
Party political offices
Preceded by Wayne Goodwin	Chair of the North Carolina Democratic Party; 2021–2023	Succeeded by Anderson Clayton
