= 2004 North Carolina's 1st congressional district special election =

North Carolina's 1st congressional district special election, 2004
- July 20, 2004
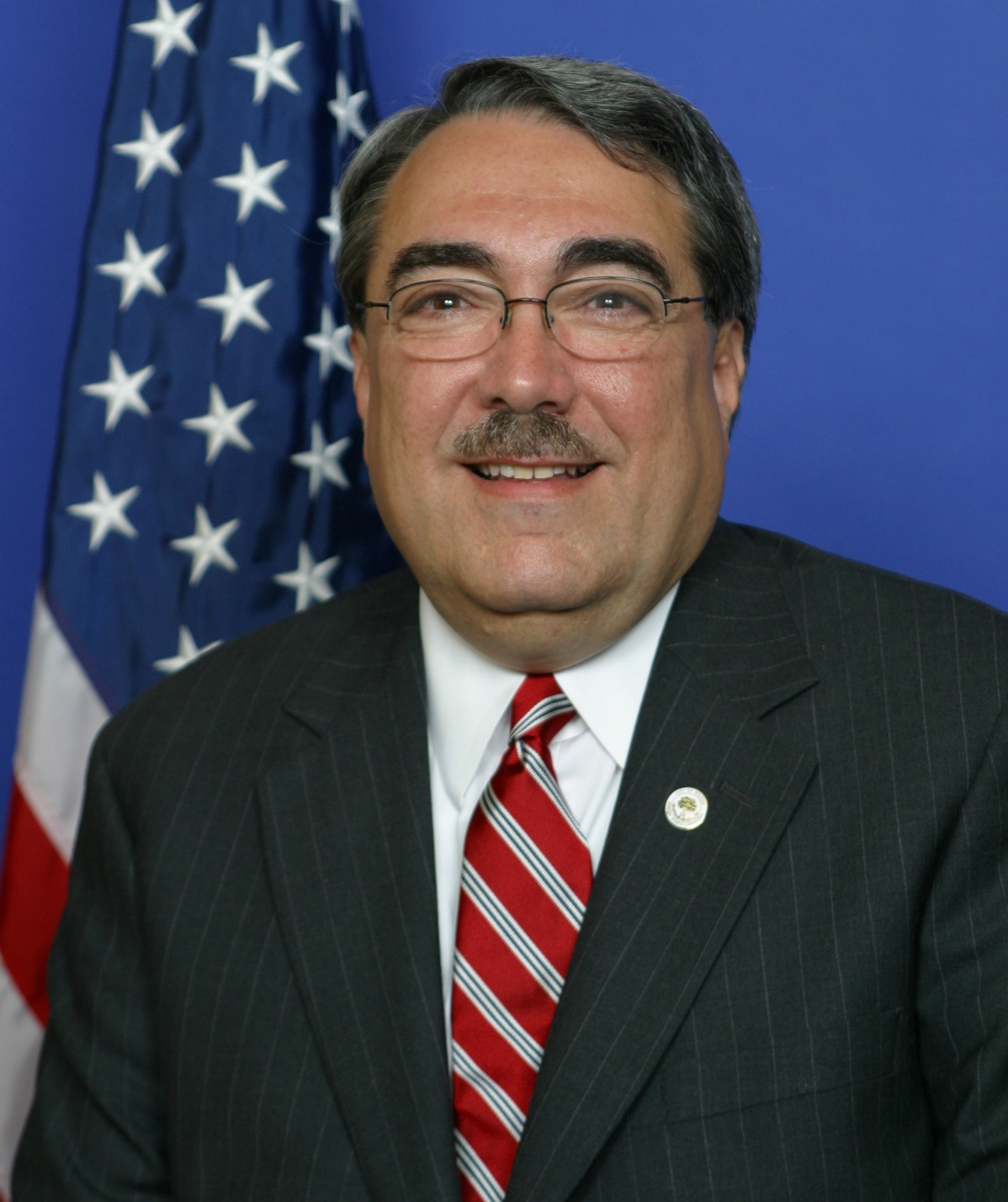

Nominee	G. K. Butterfield	Greg Dority
Party	Democratic	Republican
Popular vote	48,567	18,491
Percentage	71.15%	27.09%
- County results Butterfield: 50–60% 60–70% 70–80% 80–90%
Representative before election
Frank Ballance
Democratic
Elected Representative
G. K. Butterfield
Democratic

The 2004 United States House of Representatives special election in North Carolina's 1st congressional district was held on July 20, 2004, to select the successor to Frank Ballance (D) who resigned due to health concerns and ongoing investigations which would ultimately culminate in criminal convictions on charges of committing money laundering and mail fraud. The election was won by a wide margin by former State Supreme Court Associate Justice G. K. Butterfield.

Republicans did not seriously contest this election given the strong Democratic tilt of the district, which has not elected a Republican to the United States House of Representatives since Reconstruction nor been represented by a moderate to conservative Representative since 1992 when Walter B. Jones, Sr. (D), the father of former 3rd District Representative Walter B. Jones, Jr. (R) died.

== Party primaries ==
Each party held a nominating convention to choose their nominee for the special election. Democrats nominated Superior Court Judge and former State Supreme Court Associate Justice G. K. Butterfield, while Republicans chose security consultant Greg Dority. Butterfield overwhelmingly won the election to fill out the rest of Ballance's unexpired term. On the same day, he and Dority both won their respective parties' primaries and would face each other again in the November general election, which Butterfield would win.

== Election results ==
Special election results
Party	Candidate	Votes	%
Democratic	G. K. Butterfield	48,567	71.15
Republican	Greg Dority	18,491	27.09
Libertarian	Thomas I. Eisenmenger	1,201	1.76
Total votes		68,259	100.00
Democratic hold			
