= Josephus L. Mavretic =

American politician

Josephus Mavretic
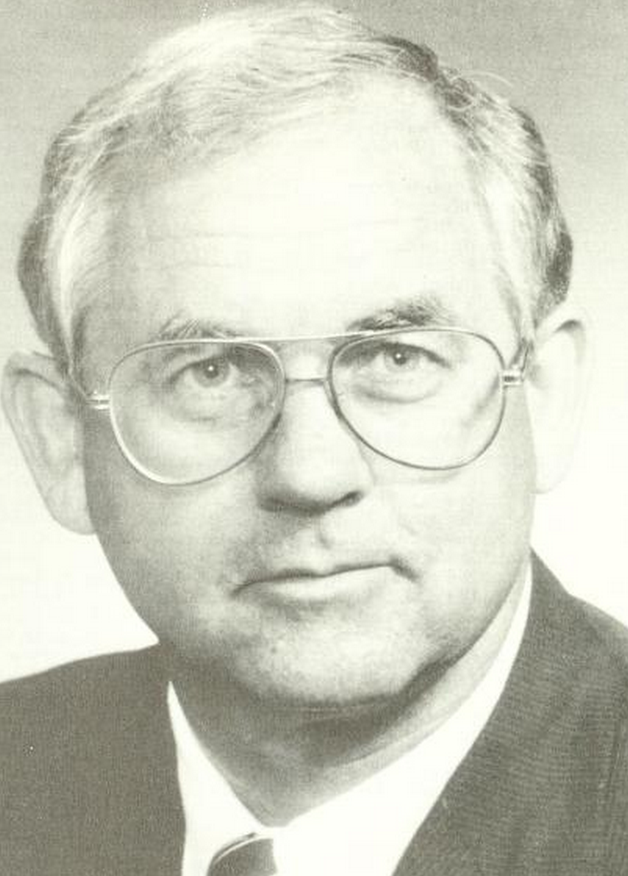

Speaker of the North Carolina House of Representatives
- In office January 1, 1989 – January 1, 1991
- Preceded by: Liston Ramsey
- Succeeded by: Dan Blue

Member of the North Carolina House of Representatives
- In office January 1, 1981 – January 1, 1995
- Preceded by: Jim Ezzell
- Succeeded by: Edward Norris Tolson
- Constituency: 7th District (1981-1983); 8th District (1983-1993); 71st District (1993-1995)

Personal details
- Born: July 29, 1934 (age 92) Powells Point, North Carolina, U.S.
- Party: Democratic
- Spouse: Laura Kranifeld
- Children: 1
- Education: University of North Carolina, Chapel Hill (AB); George Washington University (MS); Naval War College
- Occupation: Soldier (lieutenant colonel, USMC, Ret.)

Military service
- Allegiance: United States
- Branch/service: United States Marine Corps
- Years of service: 1956–1977
- Rank: Lieutenant Colonel

Josephus Lyman "Joe" Mavretic (born July 29, 1934) is a former Democratic public official and military veteran from North Carolina. Born in Currituck County, he made his career as a Marine, graduating from the Naval War College and becoming a Marine fighter pilot, retiring at the rank of lieutenant colonel. Mavretic had served 300 combat missions in Vietnam and recorded 3,000 hours of flight time.

He retired from the Marines and returned to his home state. He came from a Democratic family and community, and he ran successfully for the North Carolina House of Representatives as a Democrat in 1980. He succeeded Jim Ezzell. In spite of his party label, he admired President Ronald Reagan and was willing to buck his party on several issues.

Mavretic became nationally known when he led a bipartisan coalition to remove Liston Ramsey from the position of Speaker of the House. He then served in that position from 1989 to 1990.

He left the legislature in 1995 and retired to private life. He is now a panelist on the television news talk show NC Spin.

North Carolina House of Representatives
Preceded by Jim Ezzell	Member of the North Carolina House of Representatives from the 7th district 1981–1983; Served alongside: Allen Barbee, Roger Wayne Bone, Jeanne Tucker Fenner	Succeeded by Frank Ballance
Preceded by Sam Bundy; Ed Nelson Warren	Member of the North Carolina House of Representatives from the 8th district 1983–1993; Served alongside: Allen Barbee, Thomas Hill Matthews, Jeanne Tucker Fenner (1983–1985)	Succeeded by Linwood Eborn Mercer
Preceded by William W. Lewis	Member of the North Carolina House of Representatives from the 71st district 1993–1995	Succeeded by Edward Norris Tolson
Political offices
Preceded by Liston Ramsey	Speaker of the North Carolina House of Representatives; 1989–1991	Succeeded by Dan Blue
