= Bermudian Americans =

Americans of Bermudian birth or descent

Total population
- 8,500 (2019)

Regions with significant populations
- New York, Massachusetts, Pennsylvania, Ohio, Michigan, Illinois, Wisconsin, Delaware, Maryland, Virginia, Kentucky, North Carolina, Georgia and Florida; Smaller numbers in parts of the country including New Jersey, Rhode Island, Connecticut, Minnesota, Texas, Washington, Colorado and California

Languages
- English (American and Bermudian)

Religion
- Christianity

Bermudian Americans are Americans of full or partial Bermudian ancestry.

== Notable people ==
- Sasha Allen, singer and actress
- G. K. Butterfield, member of the United States House of Representatives
- Michael Douglas, actor and film producer
- Stephen Hopkins, Mayflower passenger
- Norman Lewis, painter, scholar, and teacher
- Andy Newmark, session drummer
- Albert Alexander Smith, artist
- Eugenius Harvey Outerbridge, chair of the Port Authority of New York and New Jersey
- Reggie Pearman, American middle distance runner
- Edgar Toppin, historian
- B. Dylan Hollis, social media personality and baker

== See also ==
- Bermuda–United States relations
