= Raymond Smith Jr. =

American politician from North Carolina

Raymond Smith
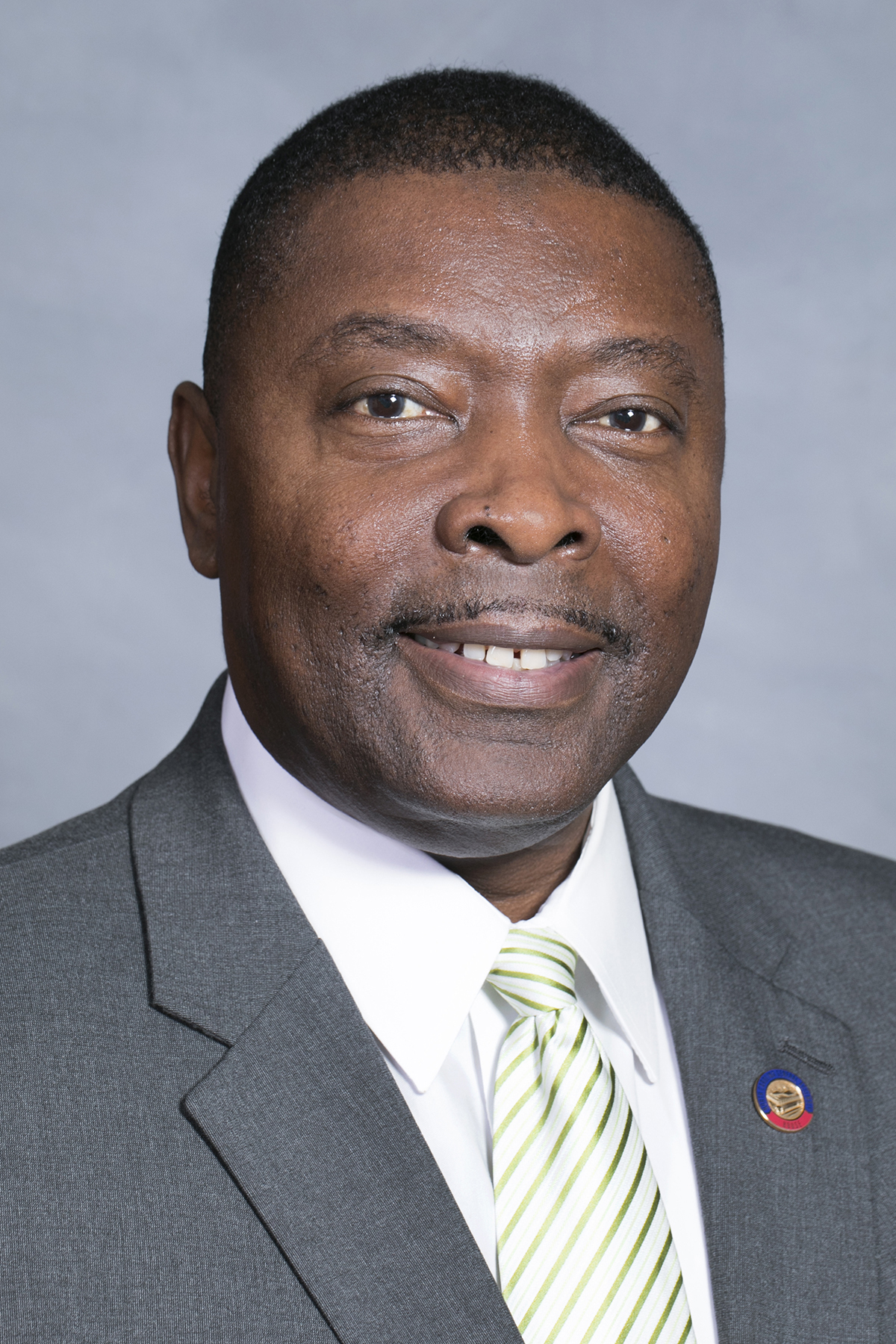
- Official portrait, 2019

Member-elect of the U.S. House of Representatives from North Carolina's 3rd district
- Assuming office January 3, 2027
- Succeeding: Greg Murphy

Member of the North Carolina House of Representatives from the 21st district
- In office January 1, 2019 – January 1, 2023
- Preceded by: Larry Bell
- Succeeded by: John Bell (redistricted)

Personal details
- Born: Raymond Edward Smith Jr. October 15, 1961 (age 65) Goldsboro, North Carolina, U.S.
- Party: Democratic
- Spouse: Cortrina
- Education: North Carolina Agricultural and Technical State University (BA); North Carolina Central University (MPA); Fayetteville State University (EdD)
- Website: State House website; Campaign website

Raymond Edward Smith Jr. (born October 15, 1961) is an American politician and Army veteran who served in the North Carolina House of Representatives for the 21st district from 2019 to 2023. He ran for Congress as the Democratic nominee for North Carolina's 3rd congressional district in the 2026 election and narrowly defeated incumbent Republican Greg Murphy in an upset.

== Career ==
Smith served in the United States Army during the Persian Gulf War, and then worked in local and state government, and served on the Wayne County Board of Education before he won the election to the state legislature on November 6, 2018, as the nominee of the Democratic Party. He secured fifty-three percent of the vote while Republican Robert Freeman Sr. secured forty-seven percent. He was re-elected in 2020.

In 2022, Smith challenged incumbent state senator Toby Fitch in the Democratic primary for North Carolina's 4th Senate district. Smith lost the primary, winning 45.5% of the vote to Fitch's 54.5%.

== Committee assignments ==
=== 2021–2022 session ===
- Education - Community Colleges
- Local Government
- Federal Relations and American Indian Affairs
- Finance
- Homeland Security, Military, and Veterans Affairs
- LGBTQ+ Rights and Restrictions

=== 2019–2020 session ===
- House Appropriations on Health and Human Services
- Appropriations
- Homeland Security, Military, and Veterans Affairs
- Transportation

== Electoral history ==
=== 2018 ===
2018 North Carolina House of Representatives 21st district election
Primary election
| Party | Candidate | Votes | % |
|---|---|---|---|
| Democratic | Raymond Smith Jr. | 1,511 | 53.17% |
| Democratic | Eugene Pearsall | 1,331 | 46.83% |
| Total votes | | 2,842 | 100% |
General election
| Democratic | Raymond Smith Jr. | 12,041 | 52.65% |
| Republican | Robert E. Freeman | 10,829 | 47.35% |
| Total votes | | 22,870 | 100% |
| Democratic hold | | | |

=== 2020 ===
2020 North Carolina House of Representatives 21st district election
| Party | Candidate | Votes | % |
|---|---|---|---|
| Democratic | Raymond Smith Jr. (incumbent) | 17,632 | 53.00% |
| Republican | Brent Heath | 15,633 | 47.00% |
| Total votes | | 33,265 | 100% |
| Democratic hold | | | |

=== 2022 ===
2022 North Carolina Senate election 4th district election
| Party | Candidate | Votes | % |
|---|---|---|---|
| Democratic | Toby Fitch (incumbent) | 6,994 | 54.48% |
| Democratic | Raymond Smith Jr. | 5,843 | 45.52% |
| Total votes | | 12,837 | 100% |

=== 2023 ===
2023 Goldsboro mayoral election
| Party | Candidate | Votes | % |
|---|---|---|---|
| Nonpartisan | Charles Gaylor | 2,076 | 49.94% |
| Nonpartisan | Raymond Smith Jr. | 2,070 | 49.80% |
| Write-in | | 11 | 0.26% |
| Total votes | | 4,157 | 100% |

=== 2024 ===
2024 North Carolina Senate 4th district general election
| Party | Candidate | Votes | % |
|---|---|---|---|
| Republican | Buck Newton (incumbent) | 55,389 | 55.12% |
| Democratic | Raymond Smith Jr. | 45,096 | 44.88% |
| Total votes | | 100,485 | 100% |
| Republican hold | | | |

=== 2026 ===
2026 North Carolina's 3rd congressional district Primary
| Party | Candidate | Votes | % |
|---|---|---|---|
| Democratic | Raymond Smith Jr. | 23,552 | 56.65% |
| Democratic | Allison Jaslow | 18,020 | 43.35% |
| Total votes | | 41,572 | 100% |

2026 North Carolina's 3rd congressional district General Election
| Party | Candidate | Votes | % |
|---|---|---|---|
| Democratic | Raymond Smith Jr. | 118,488 | 49.4% |
| Republican | Greg Murphy | 118,195 | 49.3% |
| Libertarian | Daniel Cavender | 3,007 | 1.3% |
| Total votes | | | 100% |

U.S. House of Representatives
| Preceded by Greg Murphy | Member of the U.S. House of Representatives from North Carolina's 3rd congressional district Taking office 2027 | Elect |
