= G.K. Butterfield Transportation Center =

Bus station in Greenville, North Carolina

General information
- Location: 600 South Pitt Street; Greenville, North Carolina; United States
- Coordinates: 35.61020°N 77.37728°W
- Owner: City of Greenville
- Bus stands: 12
- Bus operators: GREAT
- Connections: Amtrak Thruway; Greyhound Lines; ECU Transit

Construction
- Structure type: At-grade
- Parking: 205 spaces
- Cycle facilities: Bicycle racks
- Accessible: Yes
- Architect: Jacobs
- Architectural style: Postmodern

Other information
- Station code: Amtrak: GRN

History
- Opened: August 9, 2018
Location

The G.K. Butterfield Transportation Center is a bus station located in Greenville, North Carolina, United States. Named after U.S. Representative George Kenneth Butterfield Jr., it serves as a bus terminus for the Greenville Area Transit (GREAT) and provides intercity bus service via Amtrak Thruway and Greyhound Lines.

== Location ==
The facility takes one whole city block in Uptown Greenville, bounded by Bonners Lane, Clark, 8th, and Pitt streets. Surrounding it are various businesses, breweries and apartment complexes, while the Randy D. Doub Courthouse, Sheppard Memorial Library, and Greenville City Hall are within a short walking distance.

== History ==
Construction on the facility began in November, 2016 by Thomas Construction Company Enterprises; at an estimated cost of $8 million, 10% of which was paid by the city of Greenville. On November 14, 2017, the Greenville City Council voted unanimously to name the new facility after G.K. Butterfield, who played a vital role of securing 90% of the funding through Federal funds. On August 8, 2018, a ribbon-cutting ceremony took place with G.K. Butterfield on-hand to cut the ribbon; the facility officially began the following day at 6:25am.

The facility achieved LEED certification in 2020 and won the WoodWorks 2022 Wood Design Regional Excellence award.

== Services ==
The two-story facility is owned and operated by the City of Greenville; it is open Monday–Saturday and provides tickets/information, restrooms, conference rooms, and a waiting area. Outside, there are 12 bus bays, six dedicated to GREAT and the other six for Amtrak Thruway, Greyhound Lines, and ECU Transit. Adjacent to the facility is a 205-space surface parking lot, which offers free same-day parking.

Amtrak Thruway service connects with the Carolinian and Palmetto, via Wilson station; Bus #6090 departs at 11:57am and Bus #6089 arrives at 3:45pm.
