= G. K. Butterfield =

American politician (born 1947)

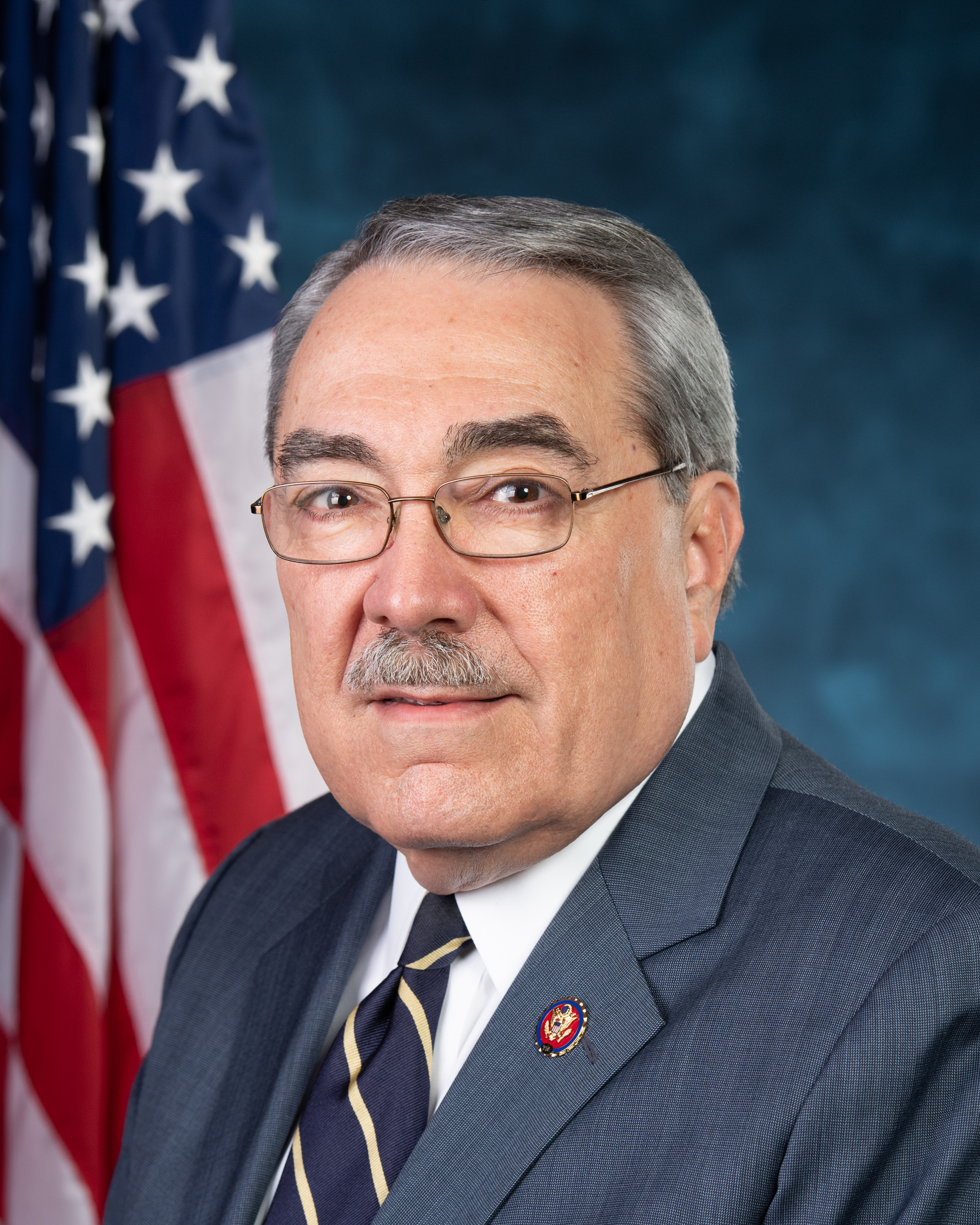
- Official portrait, 2019

House Democratic Senior Chief Deputy Whip
- In office January 3, 2021 – December 30, 2022
- Leader: Nancy Pelosi
- Preceded by: John Lewis
- Succeeded by: Jan Schakowsky

Chair of the Congressional Black Caucus
- In office January 3, 2015 – January 3, 2017
- Preceded by: Marcia Fudge
- Succeeded by: Cedric Richmond

Member of the U.S. House of Representatives from North Carolina's 1st district
- In office July 20, 2004 – December 30, 2022 (Note: Butterfield's official service begins on the date of the special election, while he was not sworn in until July 21, 2004.)
- Preceded by: Frank Ballance
- Succeeded by: Don Davis

Associate Justice of the North Carolina Supreme Court
- In office February 5, 2001 – January 1, 2003
- Appointed by: Mike Easley
- Preceded by: I. Beverly Lake Jr.
- Succeeded by: Edward Thomas Brady

Personal details
- Born: George Kenneth Butterfield Jr. April 27, 1947 (age 79) Wilson, North Carolina, U.S.
- Party: Democratic
- Spouse: Jean Farmer (m. 1971; div. 1991)
- Children: 3
- Education: North Carolina Central University (BA, JD)

Military service
- Branch/service: United States Army
- Years of service: 1968–1970
- Rank: Specialist
- Butterfield's voice Butterfield supporting legislation to extend federal recognition to the Lumbee Tribe of North Carolina. Recorded November 1, 2021

George Kenneth Butterfield Jr. (born April 27, 1947) is an American lawyer, lobbyist, and retired politician who served as the U.S. representative for North Carolina's 1st congressional district from 2004 to 2022. A member of the Democratic Party, he was first elected in a special election after the resignation of Frank Ballance.

His district was in the state's northeastern corner, which included all or parts of 19 counties. A longtime advocate of civil rights, Butterfield was appointed an associate justice of the North Carolina Supreme Court by Governor Mike Easley in 2001, retaining the position until 2003. He was a member of the Congressional Black Caucus and served as its chair from 2015 to 2017.

In November 2021, Butterfield announced that he would not run for re-election in 2022. On December 30, 2022, Butterfield resigned from his position to take up a lobbying position.

== Early life and education ==
G. K. Butterfield was born and raised in the then segregated city of Wilson, North Carolina. Butterfield came from a prominent black family with a long history in North Carolina. Both of Butterfield's parents were mixed-race Americans. His maternal grandfather, Rev Fred Davis, was a child of a former slave (Judah Davis) and a white man (Joe Davis). His mother, Addie, taught elementary school for 48 years in some of North Carolina's poorest communities. She was keenly focused on ensuring that her students learned to read. Butterfield's father, Dr. G. K. Butterfield Sr., was an immigrant from Bermuda. As a graduate of Meharry Medical College, he practiced dentistry for 50 years in the poor, segregated community of East Wilson. In the late 1940s, he helped found the Wilson Branch of the NAACP in order to register black voters in the county. In 1953, he became the first African American elected to the city council in Wilson and the first black elected official in eastern North Carolina since Reconstruction.

Butterfield graduated from Charles H. Darden High School in Wilson. He went on to earn a Bachelor of Arts in political science and sociology from North Carolina Central University (NCCU), a historically black university. During his time at NCCU, Butterfield was active in voter registration activism, including coordinating voter registration drives in Durham and organizing a student march from the State Capitol in Raleigh to the Wilson County Courthouse to draw attention to the importance of voter registration. After completing his bachelor's degree, Butterfield attended the NCCU School of Law, receiving a Juris Doctor degree in 1974.

During his junior year at NCCU, Butterfield was drafted into the United States Army and stationed at Fort Bragg Army installation in Fayetteville. He served from 1968 to 1970 and was honorably discharged, and he returned to NCCU to complete his undergraduate degree.

In describing his racial identity as a black man, he has pointed to his African heritage, as a direct descendant of enslaved people. He grew up in racially segregated North Carolina, living in "East Wilson", where he attended black schools. He spent his childhood as a firsthand witness to the disenfranchisement of his black community originating as part of a targeted campaign to remove his father from the Board of Aldermen. He is the former chair of the Congressional Black Caucus.

== Judicial career ==
After completing law school, Butterfield began a 14-year legal career as a civil rights attorney, practicing across eastern North Carolina. During this time, he developed his reputation, winning several voting-rights cases.

In 1988, Butterfield was elected Resident Superior Court judge in judicial district 7BC. Beginning on January 1, 1989, and for the next 12 years, he presided over civil and criminal court in 46 North Carolina counties. In February 2001, Governor Mike Easley appointed him to the North Carolina Supreme Court. In 2002, Butterfield lost his seat on the Supreme Court, but he returned to the Superior Court bench by special appointment of Governor Easley. He served in that position until his retirement in May 2004 to run for the U.S. House of Representatives.

== U.S. House of Representatives ==
=== Elections ===
==== 2004 special ====
Butterfield was first elected to the House of Representatives in a special election on July 20, 2004, to fill the seat of Frank Ballance, who had resigned due to health issues. He assumed office on July 21, 2004. He defeated Republican nominee Greg Dority and Libertarian Party nominee Tom Eisenmenger. Butterfield was sworn into office on July 21, 2004.

On July 20, 2004, Butterfield won the Democratic primary, entitling him to run in the November general election. Running against Dority again, he won his first full term with 64% of the popular vote.

==== 2006 ====
Butterfield was unopposed for reelection in 2006.

==== 2008 ====
Butterfield defeated Dean Stephens with 70.28% of the vote.

==== 2010 ====
Butterfield defeated Republican nominee Ashley Woolard with 59.31% of the vote.

==== 2012 ====
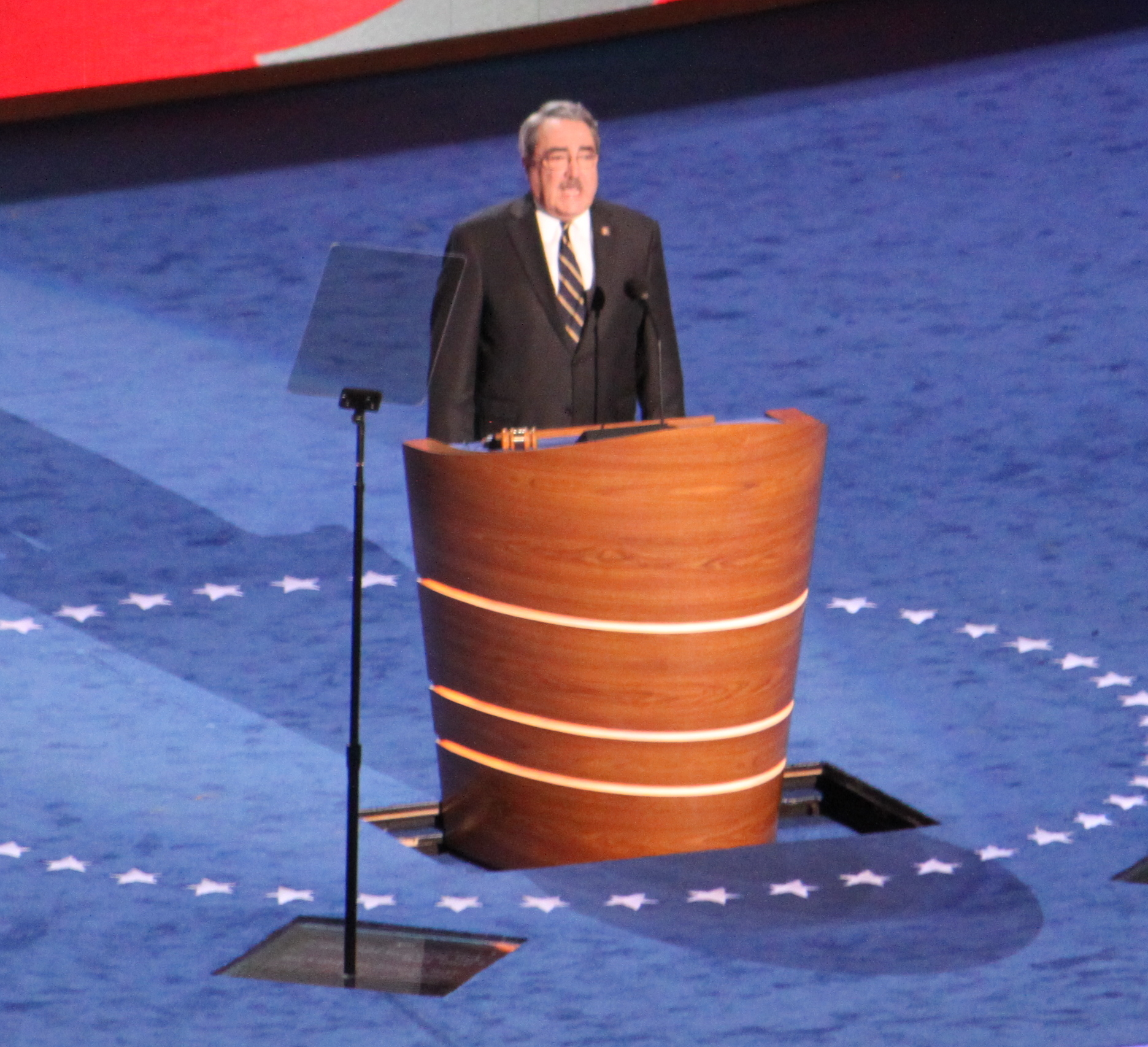
Butterfield speaking at the 2012 Democratic National Convention

Butterfield defeated Republican Pete DiLauro with 75.32% of the vote.

==== 2014 ====
Butterfield defeated Republican Arthur Rich with 73.38% of the vote.

==== 2016 ====
Butterfield defeated Republican H. Powell Dew Jr. with 68.62% of the vote.

==== 2018 ====
Butterfield defeated Republican Roger W. Allison with 69.85% of the vote.

==== 2020 ====
Butterfield defeated Republican Sandy Smith with 54.18% of the vote.

=== Committee assignments ===
- Committee on Energy and Commerce
  - Subcommittee on Communications and Technology
  - Subcommittee on Energy
  - Subcommittee on Health
- Committee on House Administration
  - Subcommittee on Elections

=== Caucus memberships ===
- Congressional Arts Caucus
- Congressional Black Caucus (first vice chair for the 113th United States Congress; chair for the 114th United States Congress)
- United States Congressional International Conservation Caucus
- Congressional Motorcycle Safety Caucus
- Congressional Out-of-Poverty Caucus

Butterfield served on the House Committee on Energy and Commerce, and formerly served on the House Armed Services Committee and the House Agriculture Committee. He was the Region VIII representative on the House Democratic Steering and Policy Committee.

Beginning in 2007, in the 110th Congress, Butterfield was chosen to serve as one of eight Chief Deputy Whips for the House Democratic Caucus. Chief Deputy Whips assist in the formulation of Democratic policy and ensure the passage of legislation by maintaining good communication with members. He was appointed to this position by Speaker Nancy Pelosi and Majority Whip Jim Clyburn.

=== Political positions ===
As a member of the House Committee on Energy and Commerce, Butterfield advocated for the American Clean Energy and Security Act. He supports "a market-based approach to capping carbon emissions" and wants to broaden the United States' sources of energy. On his website, Butterfield stresses the need to find more clean and domestic sources of energy.

A strong supporter of civil rights, Butterfield advocated renewal of the Voting Rights Act and "introduced a bill calling for the Capitol Visitor Center to acknowledge the slave labor used to build the Capitol."

Originally endorsing John Edwards for the 2008 Democratic Party presidential nomination, Butterfield endorsed Barack Obama in January 2008.

In 2009, Butterfield introduced the Don't Let the Bed Bugs Bite Act "to assist states in carrying out inspections of lodging facilities, train inspection personnel, contract with a commercial exterminator; educate owners and staff at lodging facilities." He also passed H.R. 4252 "[t]o amend the Small Business Act to change the net worth amount under the small business program for socially and economically disadvantaged individuals from $750,000 to $978,722, and for other purposes."

Butterfield supported the Affordable Care Act, and worked with the Energy and Commerce Committee to help write the legislation. During the discussion of the bill in Congress, he complained about the lack of cooperation from Republicans.

Butterfield supports increasing taxes for higher-income families while decreasing taxes for middle- and low-income families. Although he is an advocate for using government stimulus in order to improve the economy, he wants to reduce government regulations on the private sector.

In 2008, Planned Parenthood gave Butterfield an 80% rating. In 2009, Butterfield supported the interests of NARAL Pro-Choice America 100% of the time. He identifies as pro-choice on abortion, and especially supports legalized abortion when the life of the woman is in danger or if the pregnancy is a result of rape or incest. He called the day that the Supreme Court overturned Roe v. Wade a "sad day".

Butterfield has repeatedly voted against defining marriage as being between one man and one woman, voting against the Marriage Protection Act of 2004 and constitutional marriage amendments in 2004 and 2006. He has voted to ban job discrimination based on sexual orientation, and in 2010 voted for the repeal of Don't Ask Don't Tell.

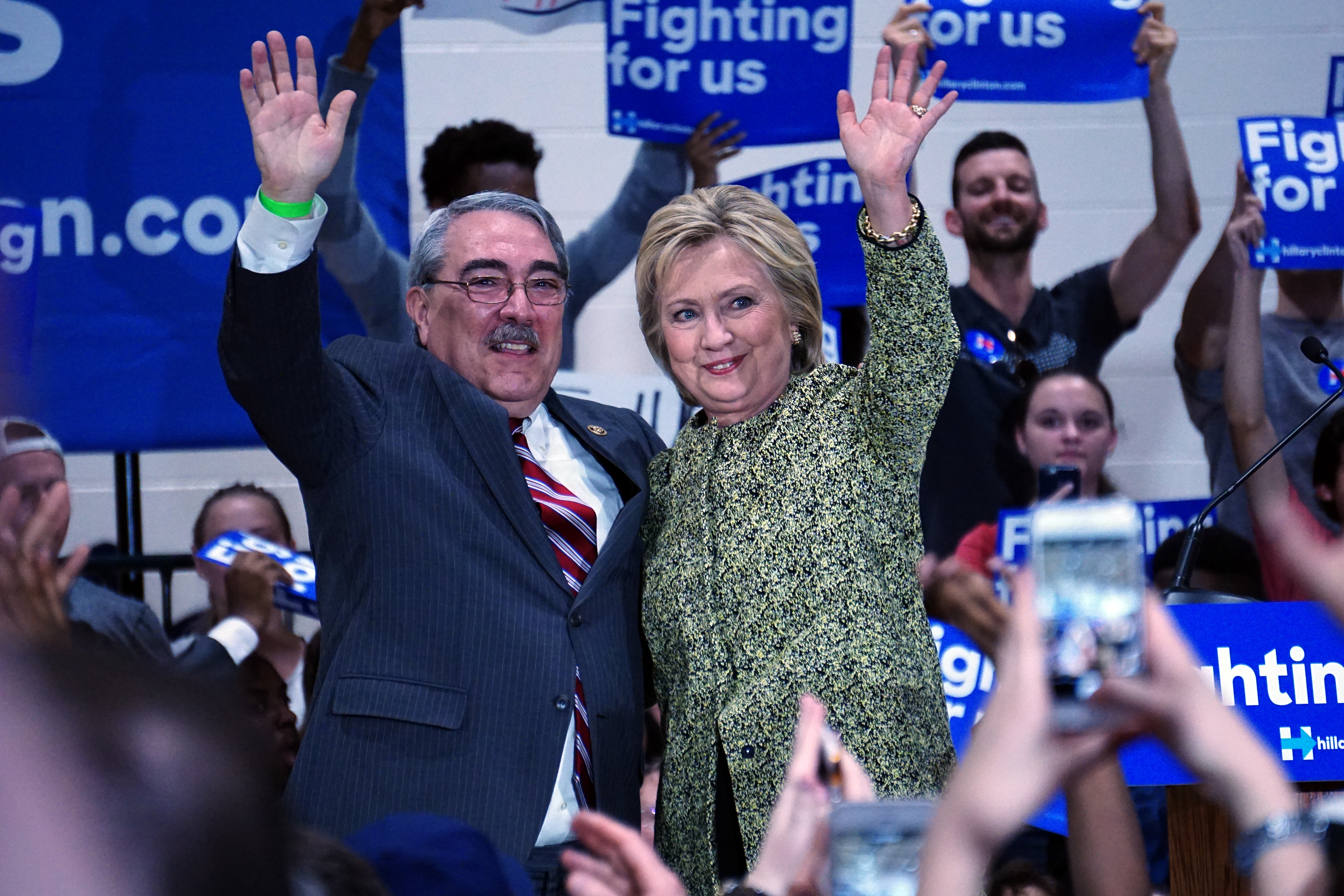
Butterfield and Hillary Clinton at Hillside High School in Durham, North Carolina, March 2016

Butterfield voted in 2008 against the Troubled Asset Relief Program (TARP) $700 billion bailout of the financial industry and the $14 billion rescue package for the auto industry.

In 2011, he voted to extend expiring provisions of the PATRIOT Act and in favor of the National Defense Authorization Act (NDAA) for Fiscal Year 2012.

In 2012, Butterfield introduced legislation that would require more input from the public before tolls are introduced on roads. The legislation was in response to the "No toll on I-95" group, a Roanoke Rapids-based group that opposes instating a toll on I-95. Opponents of the toll argue that it leads to double taxation, and say it is the first time that "the federal government has put tolls on an existing interstate."

In April 2012, Butterfield accompanied Obama to the University of North Carolina at Chapel Hill to speak about extending the interest rates on federal loan programs for many undergraduate students. Butterfield expressed concern with the pending expiration, saying: "Allowing the current interest rates to expire would burden students with additional debt, prolong their ability to kick start their careers, and send the message that it is more important to cut taxes for the wealthy than educational expenses for our young people."

On July 23, 2014, Butterfield introduced House Joint Resolution 120, approving the location of a memorial to commemorate the more than 5,000 slaves and free black persons who fought for independence in the American Revolution.

As of 2022, Butterfield had voted with President Joe Biden's stated position 100% of the time, according to FiveThirtyEight.

== Post-political career ==
As of 2026, Butterfield was a lobbyist with McGuireWoods.

== Personal life ==
Butterfield has three daughters. As of 2022, he was a member of the Jackson Chapel First Missionary Baptist Church in Wilson, North Carolina. As of 2018, he served on the Board of Visitors for the North Carolina Central University School of Law and as a Trustee of Gallaudet University. He is a member of Sigma Pi Phi fraternity, Gamma Sigma chapter and a member of Groove Phi Groove. In 2017, the City of Greenville named its new transit center, the G.K. Butterfield Transportation Center, in his honor. In 2024, a segment of Interstate 95 and the Wilson train station were also named in his honor.

== Electoral history ==
North Carolina Supreme Court Associate Justice (Butterfield seat) election, 2002
Party	Candidate	Votes	%
Republican	Edward Thomas Brady	1,159,476	53.88%
Democratic	G. K. Butterfield (incumbent)	992,603	46.12%
Total votes		2,152,079	100%
Republican gain from Democratic			

2004 North Carolina's 1st congressional district election
Party	Candidate	Votes	%
Democratic	G. K. Butterfield	137,667	63.98
Republican	Greg Dority	77,508	36.02
Total votes		215,175	100
Democratic hold			

2006 North Carolina's 1st congressional district election
Party	Candidate	Votes	%
Democratic	G. K. Butterfield (incumbent)	82,510	100
Total votes		82,510	100
Democratic hold			

2008 North Carolina's 1st congressional district election
Party	Candidate	Votes	%
Democratic	G. K. Butterfield (incumbent)	192,765	70.28
Republican	Dean Stephens	81,506	29.72
Total votes		274,271	100
Democratic hold			

2010 North Carolina's 1st congressional district election
Party	Candidate	Votes	%
Democratic	G. K. Butterfield (incumbent)	103,294	59.31
Republican	Ashley Woolard	70,867	40.69
Total votes		174,161	100
Democratic hold			

2012 North Carolina's 1st congressional district election
Party	Candidate	Votes	%
Democratic	G. K. Butterfield (incumbent)	254,644	75.32
Republican	Pete DiLauro	77,288	22.86
Libertarian	Darryl Holloman	6,134	1.81
Total votes		338,066	99.9
Democratic hold			

2014 North Carolina's 1st congressional district election
Party	Candidate	Votes	%
Democratic	G. K. Butterfield (incumbent)	154,333	73.38
Republican	Arthur Rich	55,990	26.62
Total votes		210,323	100
Democratic hold			

2016 North Carolina's 1st congressional district election
Party	Candidate	Votes	%
Democratic	G. K. Butterfield (incumbent)	240,661	68.62
Republican	H. Powell Dew Jr.	101,567	28.96
Libertarian	Joseph John Summerell	8,259	2.4
Total votes		346,830	99.98
Democratic hold			

2018 North Carolina's 1st congressional district election
Party	Candidate	Votes	%
Democratic	G. K. Butterfield (incumbent)	190,457	69.9
Republican	Roger Allison	82,218	30.2
Total votes		272,675	100.0
Democratic hold			

2020 North Carolina's 1st congressional district election
Party	Candidate	Votes	%
Democratic	G. K. Butterfield (incumbent)	188,870	54.2
Republican	Sandy Smith	159,758	45.8
Total votes		348,618	100.0
Democratic hold			

== See also ==
- List of African-American United States representatives
- North Carolina Democratic Party

Legal offices
Preceded by I. Beverly Lake Jr.	Associate Justice of the North Carolina Supreme Court; 2001–2003	Succeeded by Edward Thomas Brady
U.S. House of Representatives
Preceded by Frank Ballance	Member of the U.S. House of Representatives from North Carolina's 1st congressional district 2004–2022	Succeeded by Don Davis
Preceded by Marcia Fudge	Chair of the Congressional Black Caucus; 2015–2017	Succeeded by Cedric Richmond
Party political offices
Preceded by Cedric Richmond as House Democratic Assistant to the Majority Whip	House Democratic Senior Chief Deputy Whip; 2021–2022; Served alongside: Jan Schakowsky	Succeeded by Jan Schakowsky
Preceded by Jan Schakowsky	House Democratic Senior Chief Deputy Whip; 2021–2022; Served alongside: Jan Schakowsky	Succeeded by Jan Schakowsky
U.S. order of precedence (ceremonial)
Preceded by Mike McIntyre as Former U.S. Representative	Order of precedence of the United States as Former U.S. Representative	Succeeded by Bill Gradison as Former U.S. Representative
