= Angela Bryant =

American politician from North Carolina

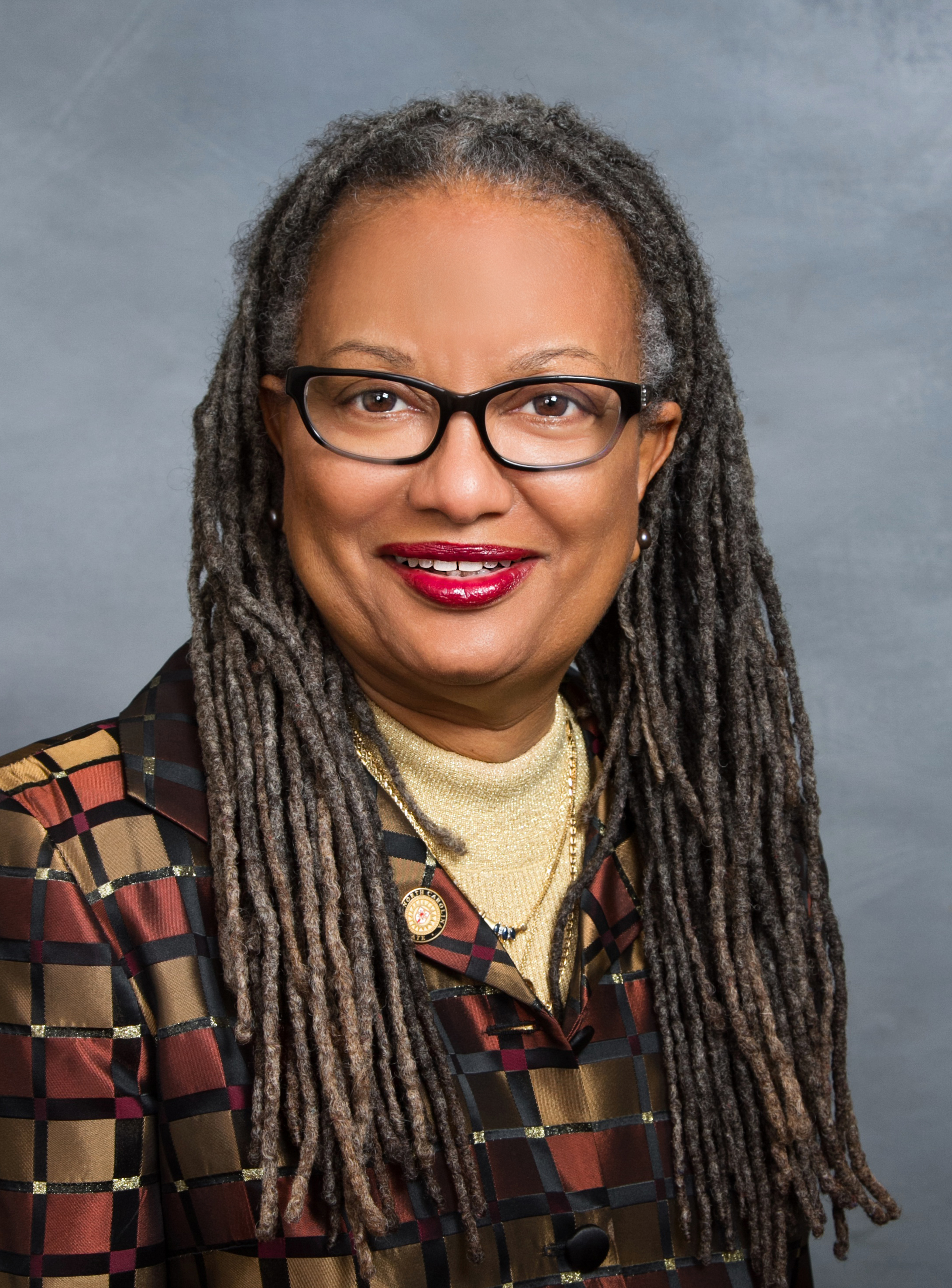
- Official portrait, 2013

Member of the North Carolina Senate from the 4th district
- In office January 7, 2013 – March 2018
- Preceded by: Ed Jones
- Succeeded by: Toby Fitch

Member of the North Carolina House of Representatives from the 7th district
- In office January 24, 2007 – January 4, 2013
- Preceded by: Ed Jones
- Succeeded by: Bobbie Richardson

Personal details
- Born: December 9, 1951 (age 74) Rocky Mount, North Carolina
- Party: Democratic
- Occupation: Attorney, business consultant

Angela R. Bryant (born December 9, 1951) is an American Democratic politician who currently serves as a member of the North Carolina Post-Release Supervision and Parole Commission (a full-time position). From 2007 through 2018, she served in the North Carolina General Assembly.

Bryant represented the 7th district in the North Carolina House of Representatives starting with her appointment in 2007 to fill a vacancy caused by the resignation of Ed Jones upon his appointment to the state Senate. She was re-elected in 2008, 2010, and 2012. In 2013, she was selected by a committee of local Democrats and then appointed by Governor Pat McCrory (who was required to accept the local committee's selection), to fill the seat of state Sen. Ed Jones, who had died after being re-elected in the 2012 general election. She represented District 4 in the North Carolina Senate (including constituents in Halifax, Nash, Vance, Warren, and Wilson counties).

North Carolina House of Representatives
Preceded by Ed Jones	Member of the North Carolina House of Representatives from the 7th district 2007-2013	Succeeded by Bobbie Richardson
North Carolina Senate
Preceded by Ed Jones	Member of the North Carolina Senate from the 4th district 2013-2018	Succeeded by Toby Fitch
