= Robert Lee Holloman =

American politician (1953–2007)

Member of the North Carolina Senate from the 4th district
- In office January 1, 2003 – January 8, 2007
- Preceded by: Frank Ballance (Redistricting)
- Succeeded by: Ed Jones

Personal details
- Party: Democratic

Robert Lee Holloman (1953 – January 8, 2007) was a Democratic member of the North Carolina General Assembly who represented the state's fourth Senate district, including constituents in Bertie, Chowan, Gates, Halifax, Hertford, Northampton, and Perquimans counties. Holloman lived in Ahoskie, North Carolina and was a pastor at Nebo Missionary Baptist Church in Murfreesboro. Holloman died in January 2007 after being elected in November 2006 to his third term in the state Senate. He died one day after his fellow Hertford County legislator, Howard J. Hunter, Jr. Robert Lee Holloman was the son of Daraious and Beatrice Vaughan Holloman.

== Notes ==
North Carolina Senate
Preceded by Patrick Ballantine	Member of the North Carolina Senate from the 4th district 2003–2007	Succeeded by Ed Jones
