= Toby Fitch =

American politician

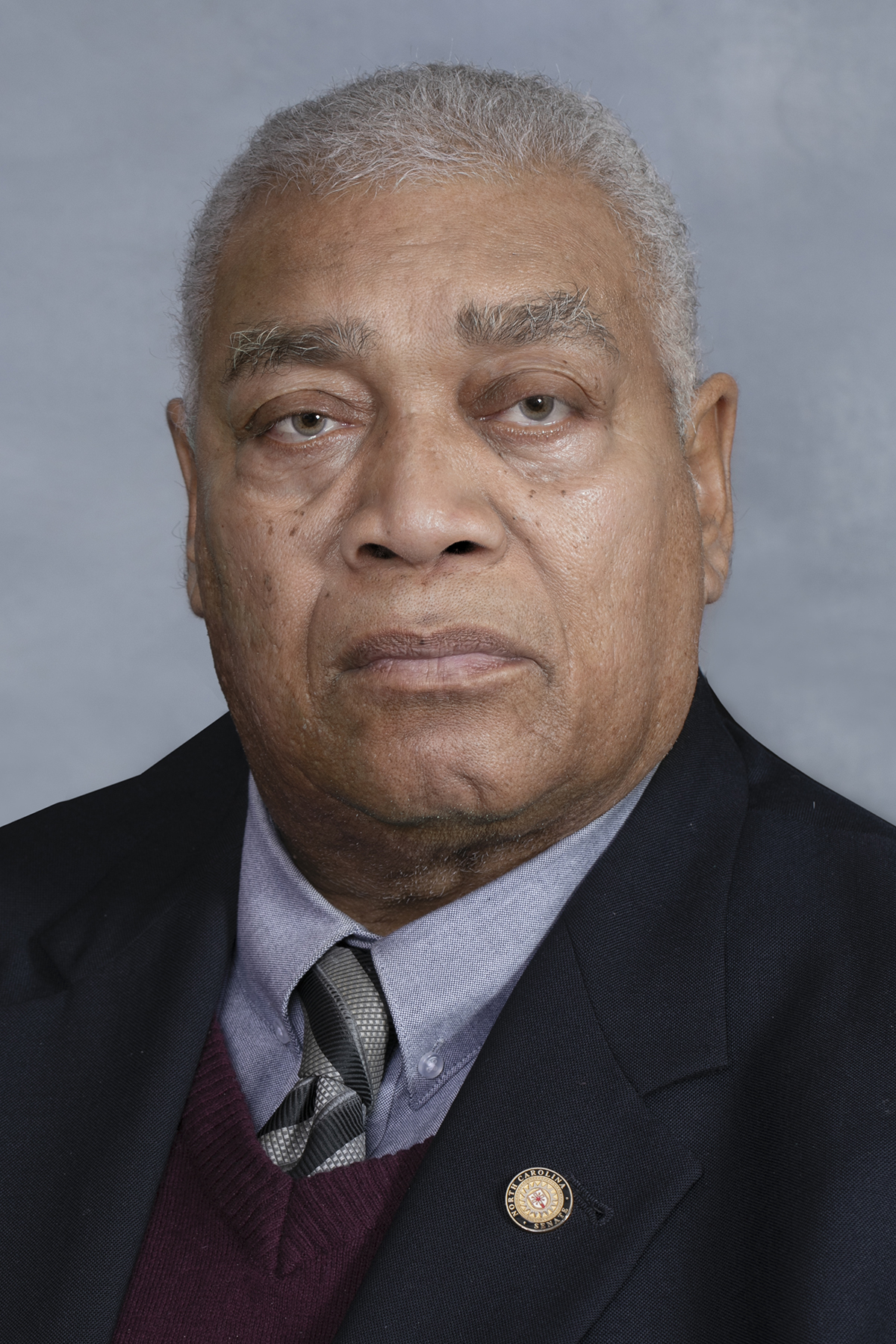
- Official portrait, 2019

Member of the North Carolina Senate from the 4th district
- In office March 23, 2018 – January 1, 2023
- Preceded by: Angela Bryant
- Succeeded by: Buck Newton

Member of the North Carolina House of Representatives from the 70th district
- In office January 1, 1985 – December 29, 2001
- Preceded by: Constituency established
- Succeeded by: Shelly Willingham

Personal details
- Born: Milton Frederick Fitch Jr. October 20, 1946 (age 80) Wilson, North Carolina, U.S.
- Party: Democratic
- Education: North Carolina Central University (BS, JD)
- Occupation: Judge, attorney

Milton Frederick "Toby" Fitch Jr. (born October 20, 1946) is a Democratic former member of the North Carolina State Senate. He is a retired North Carolina Superior Court Judge, serving from 2002 to 2018. Fitch also served in the North Carolina House of Representatives from 1985 to 2001 (70th district), prior to serving as a judge.

== Electoral history ==
=== 2022 ===
North Carolina Senate 4th district Democratic primary election, 2022
| Party | Candidate | Votes | % |
|---|---|---|---|
| Democratic | Toby Fitch (incumbent) | 6,994 | 54.48% |
| Democratic | Raymond Smith Jr. | 5,843 | 45.52% |
| Total votes | | 12,837 | 100% |

=== 2020 ===
North Carolina Senate 4th district general election, 2020
| Party | Candidate | Votes | % |
|---|---|---|---|
| Democratic | Toby Fitch (incumbent) | 51,384 | 57.16% |
| Republican | Sammy Davis Webb | 38,514 | 42.84% |
| Total votes | | 89,898 | 100% |
| Democratic hold | | | |

=== 2018 ===
North Carolina Senate 4th district general election, 2018
| Party | Candidate | Votes | % |
|---|---|---|---|
| Democratic | Toby Fitch (incumbent) | 36,471 | 57.77% |
| Republican | Richard Scott | 25,391 | 40.22% |
| Libertarian | Jesse Shearin | 1,264 | 2.00% |
| Total votes | | 63,126 | 100% |
| Democratic hold | | | |

=== 2010 ===
North Carolina Superior Court 7B district general election, 2010
| Candidate | Votes | % |
|---|---|---|
| Toby Fitch (incumbent) | 7,763 | 100% |
| Total votes | 7,763 | 100% |

=== 2002 ===
North Carolina Superior Court 7B district general election, 2002
| Candidate | Votes | % |
|---|---|---|
| Toby Fitch (incumbent) | 6,517 | 100% |
| Total votes | 6,517 | 100% |

=== 2000 ===
North Carolina House of Representatives 70th district general election, 2000
| Party | Candidate | Votes | % |
|---|---|---|---|
| Democratic | Toby Fitch (incumbent) | 13,033 | 100% |
| Total votes | | 13,033 | 100% |
| Democratic hold | | | |

North Carolina House of Representatives
| Preceded by Constituency established | Member of the North Carolina House of Representatives from the 70th district 1985-2001 | Succeeded by Shelly Willingham |
North Carolina Senate
| Preceded by Angela Bryant | Member of the North Carolina Senate from the 4th district 2018-present | Incumbent |
