= Kanika Brown =

American politician

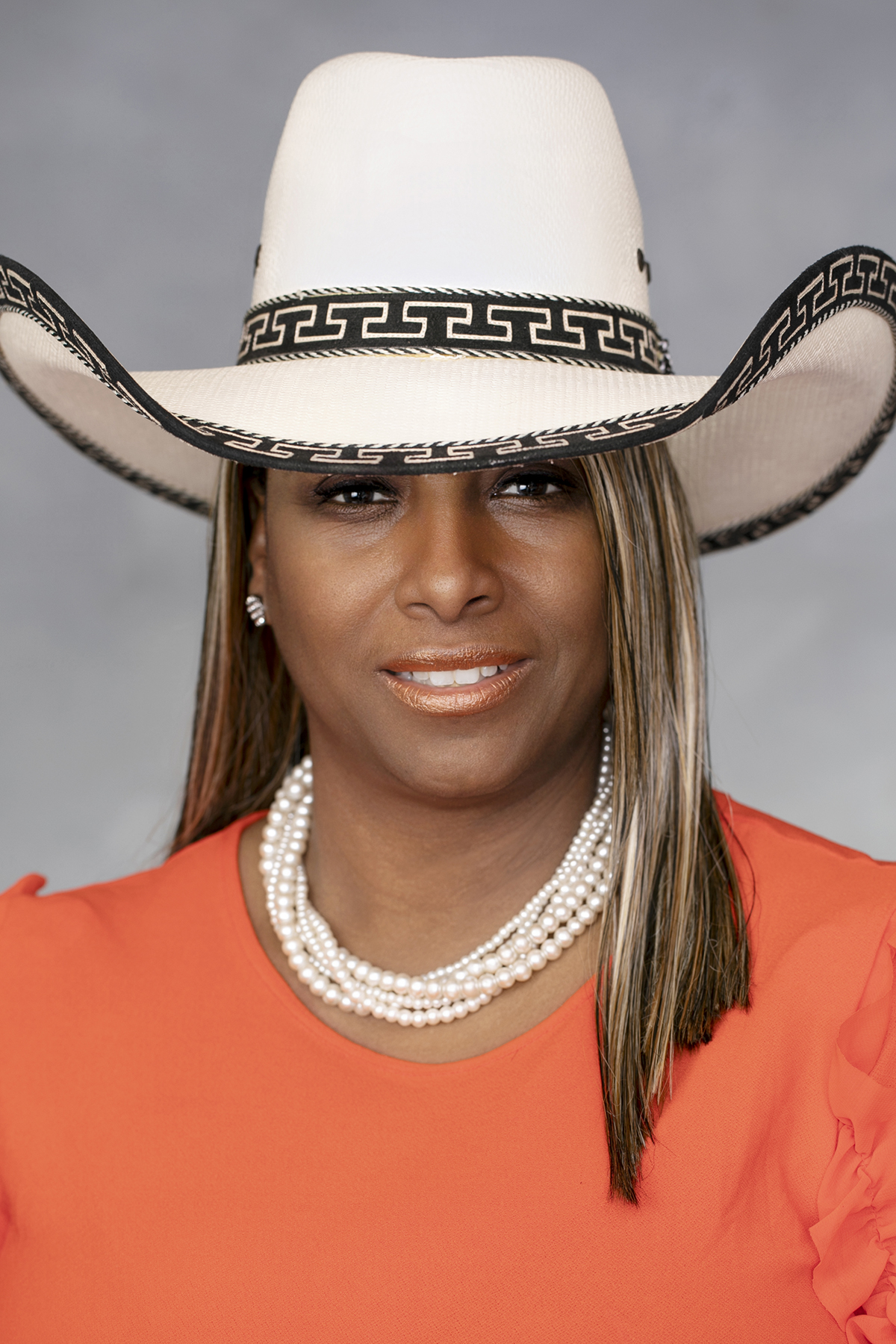

Member of the North Carolina House of Representatives from the 71st district
- Incumbent
- Assumed office January 1, 2023
- Preceded by: Evelyn Terry

Personal details
- Party: Democratic

Kanika Shevon Brown is an American politician. She has been a Democratic member of the North Carolina House of Representatives for 71st district (parts of Forsyth County) since 2023. She originally ran in 2020 against then incumbent Evelyn Terry but lost in the Democratic primary. However, in 2022, she ran for the same seat once again and won against two other opponents, one being Evelyn Terry's husband Frederick Terry. She's a member of the Progressive House Caucus.

== Committee assignments ==
=== 2023-2024 session ===
- Appropriations
- Appropriations - General Government
- Agriculture
- Alcoholic Beverage Control
- Commerce

== Electoral history ==
=== 2022 ===
North Carolina House of Representatives 71st district general election, 2022
| Party | Candidate | Votes | % |
|---|---|---|---|
| Democratic | Kanika Brown | 18,196 | 100% |
| Total votes | | 18,196 | 100% |
| Democratic hold | | | |

North Carolina House of Representatives 71st district Democratic primary election, 2022
| Party | Candidate | Votes | % |
|---|---|---|---|
| Democratic | Kanika Brown | 2,336 | 47.85% |
| Democratic | Frederick N. Terry | 1,871 | 38.32% |
| Democratic | David M. Moore | 675 | 13.83% |
| Total votes | | 4,882 | 100% |

=== 2020 ===
North Carolina House of Representatives 71st district Democratic primary election, 2020
| Party | Candidate | Votes | % |
|---|---|---|---|
| Democratic | Evelyn Terry (incumbent) | 7,224 | 64.64% |
| Democratic | Kanika Brown | 3,952 | 35.36% |
| Total votes | | 11,176 | 100% |

North Carolina House of Representatives
| Preceded by Evelyn Terry | Member of the North Carolina House of Representatives from the 71st district 2023–Present | Incumbent |
