= Anderson Clayton =

American political activist

Chair of the North Carolina Democratic Party
- Incumbent
- Assumed office February 11, 2023
- Preceded by: Bobbie Richardson

Personal details
- Born: Roxboro, North Carolina, U.S.
- Party: Democratic
- Education: Appalachian State University (BA)

Anderson Clayton is an American political activist who serves as the current chair of the North Carolina Democratic Party. Elected at 25 years old, Clayton is the youngest chair of a state political party in the U.S.

== Early life ==
Clayton grew up in Roxboro, North Carolina and attended Appalachian State University. She graduated in 2019 with majors in journalism and political science.

== Career ==
Clayton's political work began with registering voters while an undergraduate at Appalachian State University. As a sophomore, she was elected Student Body President and served from 2017-2018.

After graduating, she worked on the congressional campaign of Kathy Manning. In the 2020 election cycle, she worked in Iowa as a field organizer for the presidential campaigns of Kamala Harris and Elizabeth Warren, and then for the Senate campaign of Amy McGrath in Kentucky.

After the 2020 election cycle, Clayton returned to Roxboro, North Carolina and was elected the chair of the Person County Democratic Party in 2021.

In February 2023, Clayton was elected to a two-year term as chair of the North Carolina Democratic Party, defeating incumbent Bobbie Richardson in a second round of voting. Under her leadership, the North Carolina Democratic Party has run candidates in all 50 North Carolina Senate districts and 118 out of 120 North Carolina House of Representatives districts in the 2024 cycle. She was overwhelmingly re-elected for another 2-year term in 2025.

In addition to her work for the North Carolina Democratic Party, Clayton is also employed as a broadband analyst with non-profit Rural Innovation Strategies.

Party political offices
Preceded by Bobbie Richardson	Chair of the North Carolina Democratic Party; 2023–present	Incumbent
