= North Carolina's 71st House district =

American legislative district

North Carolina's 71st State House of Representatives district
Representative
Kanika Brown; D–Winston-Salem
- Demographics: 46% White; 27% Black; 19% Hispanic; 2% Asian; 4% Multiracial
- Population (2024): 87,650

North Carolina's 71st House district is one of 120 districts in the North Carolina House of Representatives. It has been represented by Democrat Kanika Brown since 2023.

== Geography ==
Since 2003, the district has included part of Forsyth County. The district overlaps with the 32nd Senate district.

== District officeholders ==
Representative	Party	Dates	Notes	Counties
District created January 1, 1985.
Larry E. Etheridge (Wilson)	Republican	January 1, 1985 – January 1, 1991		1985–1993; Parts of Wilson and Nash counties.
William W. Lewis (Wilson)	Republican	January 1, 1991 – January 1, 1993		1985–1993; Parts of Wilson and Nash counties.
Josephus Mavretic (Tarboro)	Democratic	January 1, 1993 – January 1, 1995	Redistricted from the 8th district.	1993–2003; Parts of Nash, Edgecombe, Pitt, and Wilson counties.
Edward Norris Tolson (Pinetops)	Democratic	January 1, 1995 – January 1, 1997		1993–2003; Parts of Nash, Edgecombe, Pitt, and Wilson counties.
Joe Tolson (Pinetops)	Democratic	January 1, 1997 – January 1, 2003	Redistricted to the 23rd district.	1993–2003; Parts of Nash, Edgecombe, Pitt, and Wilson counties.
Larry Womble (Winston-Salem)	Democratic	January 1, 2003 – January 1, 2013	Redistricted from the 66th district. Retired.	2003–Present; Part of Forsyth County.
Evelyn Terry (Winston-Salem)	Democratic	January 1, 2013 – January 1, 2023	Retired.	2003–Present; Part of Forsyth County.
Kanika Brown (Winston-Salem)	Democratic	January 1, 2023 – Present		2003–Present; Part of Forsyth County.

== Election results ==
=== 2024 ===
North Carolina House of Representatives 71st district general election, 2024
Party	Candidate	Votes	%
Democratic	Kanika Brown (incumbent)	31,755	100%
Total votes		31,755	100%
Democratic hold			

=== 2022 ===
North Carolina House of Representatives 71st district Democratic primary election, 2022
Party	Candidate	Votes	%
Democratic	Kanika Brown	2,336	47.85%
Democratic	Frederick N. Terry	1,871	38.32%
Democratic	David M. Moore	675	13.83%
Total votes		4,882	100%

North Carolina House of Representatives 71st district general election, 2022
Party	Candidate	Votes	%
Democratic	Kanika Brown	18,196	100%
Total votes		18,196	100%
Democratic hold			

=== 2020 ===
North Carolina House of Representatives 71st district Democratic primary election, 2020
Party	Candidate	Votes	%
Democratic	Evelyn Terry (incumbent)	7,224	64.64%
Democratic	Kanika Brown	3,952	35.36%
Total votes		11,176	100%

North Carolina House of Representatives 71st district general election, 2020
Party	Candidate	Votes	%
Democratic	Evelyn Terry (incumbent)	28,471	100%
Total votes		28,471	100%
Democratic hold			

=== 2018 ===
North Carolina House of Representatives 71st district general election, 2018
Party	Candidate	Votes	%
Democratic	Evelyn Terry (incumbent)	18,242	72.67%
Republican	Scott Arnold	6,861	27.33%
Total votes		25,103	100%
Democratic hold			

=== 2016 ===
North Carolina House of Representatives 71st district general election, 2016
Party	Candidate	Votes	%
Democratic	Evelyn Terry (incumbent)	25,414	100%
Total votes		25,414	100%
Democratic hold			

=== 2014 ===
North Carolina House of Representatives 71st district general election, 2014
Party	Candidate	Votes	%
Democratic	Evelyn Terry (incumbent)	12,536	76.63%
Republican	Kris McCann	3,824	23.37%
Total votes		16,360	100%
Democratic hold			

=== 2012 ===
North Carolina House of Representatives 71st district Democratic primary election, 2012
Party	Candidate	Votes	%
Democratic	Evelyn Terry	3,463	51.34%
Democratic	Everette Witherspoon	3,282	48.66%
Total votes		6,745	100%

North Carolina House of Representatives 71st district general election, 2012
Party	Candidate	Votes	%
Democratic	Evelyn Terry	23,545	77.94%
Republican	Kris McCann	6,664	22.06%
Total votes		30,209	100%
Democratic hold			

=== 2010 ===
North Carolina House of Representatives 71st district general election, 2010
Party	Candidate	Votes	%
Democratic	Larry Womble (incumbent)	9,503	100%
Total votes		9,503	100%
Democratic hold			

=== 2008 ===
North Carolina House of Representatives 71st district general election, 2008
Party	Candidate	Votes	%
Democratic	Larry Womble (incumbent)	21,583	90.02%
Libertarian	Bobby Richmond	2,393	9.98%
Total votes		23,976	100%
Democratic hold			

=== 2006 ===
North Carolina House of Representatives 71st district general election, 2006
Party	Candidate	Votes	%
Democratic	Larry Womble (incumbent)	7,101	100%
Total votes		7,101	100%
Democratic hold			

=== 2004 ===
North Carolina House of Representatives 71st district general election, 2004
Party	Candidate	Votes	%
Democratic	Larry Womble (incumbent)	15,840	86.93%
Libertarian	Lynn Haggerty	2,381	13.07%
Total votes		18,221	100%
Democratic hold			

=== 2002 ===
North Carolina House of Representatives 71st district Republican primary election, 2002
Party	Candidate	Votes	%
Republican	Mac Weatherman	1,348	82.85%
Republican	Charona Turner Remillard	279	17.15%
Total votes		1,627	100%

North Carolina House of Representatives 71st district general election, 2002
Party	Candidate	Votes	%
Democratic	Larry Womble (incumbent)	9,662	66.11%
Republican	Mac Weatherman	4,571	31.28%
Libertarian	Lynn Haggerty	382	2.61%
Total votes		14,615	100%
Democratic hold			

=== 2000 ===
North Carolina House of Representatives 71st district general election, 2000
Party	Candidate	Votes	%
Democratic	Joe Tolson (incumbent)	12,915	63.30%
Republican	Wade Ellison	7,489	36.70%
Total votes		20,404	100%
Democratic hold			
