= Evelyn Terry =

American politician (born 1943)

Representative Evelyn Terry
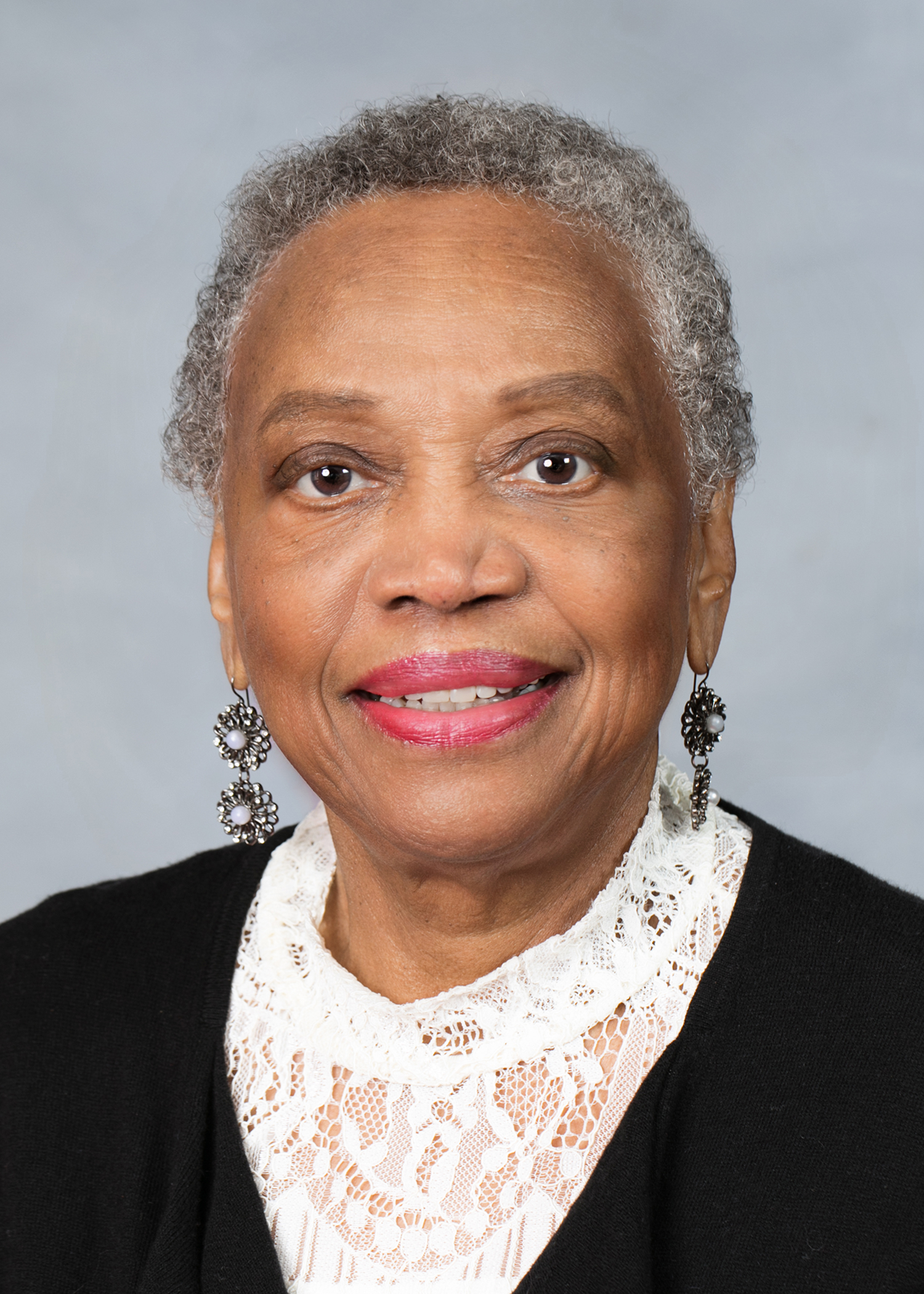

Member of the North Carolina House of Representatives from the 71st district
- In office January 1, 2013 – January 1, 2023
- Preceded by: Larry Womble
- Succeeded by: Kanika Brown

Personal details
- Born: September 14, 1943 (age 83)
- Party: Democratic
- Education: Johnson C. Smith University (BA); Appalachian State University (MA)
- Occupation: Retired educator

Evelyn Abrams Terry (born September 14, 1943) is an American politician from North Carolina. She was first elected to the North Carolina House of Representatives in 2012. A member of the Democratic party, she represented the 71st district (including constituents in southern Forsyth County) from 2013 to 2023. Terry previously served on the Winston-Salem city council from 2005 to 2009.

== Committee assignments ==
=== 2021-2022 session ===
- Appropriations
- Appropriations - Health & Human Services
- Education - Universities (Vice Chair)
- Commerce
- Environment
- Select Committee on An Education System for North Carolina's future

=== 2019-2020 session ===
- Appropriations
- Appropriations - Health and Human Services
- Commerce
- Environment
- Health
- Homelessness, Foster Care, and Dependency

=== 2017-2018 session ===
- Appropriations
- Appropriations - Transportation
- Homelessness, Foster Care, and Dependency (Vice Chair)
- Commerce and Job Development
- Environment
- Ethics

=== 2015-2016 session ===
- Appropriations
- Appropriations - Transportation
- Commerce and Job Development
- Ethics
- Banking
- Children, Youth and Families
- Judiciary IV
- Transportation

=== 2013-2014 session ===
- Appropriations
- Commerce and Job Development
- Transportation
- Agriculture
- Elections

== Electoral history ==
=== 2020 ===
In 2020, she defeated Kanika Brown in the Democratic primary. She was unopposed in the general election.

North Carolina House of Representatives 71st district Democratic primary election, 2020
Party	Candidate	Votes	%
Democratic	Evelyn Terry (incumbent)	7,224	64.64%
Democratic	Kanika Brown	3,952	35.36%
Total votes		11,176	100%

North Carolina House of Representatives 71st district general election, 2020
Party	Candidate	Votes	%
Democratic	Evelyn Terry (incumbent)	28,471	100%
Total votes		28,471	100%
Democratic hold			

=== 2018 ===
Terry was easily re-elected to a 4th term in 2018 with just under 73% of the vote over Republican nominee Scott Arnold.

North Carolina House of Representatives 71st district general election, 2018
Party	Candidate	Votes	%
Democratic	Evelyn Terry (incumbent)	18,242	72.67%
Republican	Scott Arnold	6,861	27.33%
Total votes		25,103	100%
Democratic hold			

=== 2016 ===
Terry was unopposed in both the primary and general elections in 2016.

North Carolina House of Representatives 71st district general election, 2016
Party	Candidate	Votes	%
Democratic	Evelyn Terry (incumbent)	25,414	100%
Total votes		25,414	100%
Democratic hold			

=== 2014 ===
Terry didn't face a primary challenger in 2012. She defeated Republican nominee Kris McCann in a rematch, only slightly under performing her 2012 election performance.

North Carolina House of Representatives 71st district general election, 2014
Party	Candidate	Votes	%
Democratic	Evelyn Terry (incumbent)	12,536	76.63%
Republican	Kris McCann	3,824	23.37%
Total votes		16,360	100%
Democratic hold			

=== 2012 ===
In 2012, Terry sought the open NC House seat being vacated by fellow Democrat Larry Womble. She narrowly defeated Everette Witherspoon in the Democratic primary and then easily defeated Republican nominee Kris McCann in the general election.

North Carolina House of Representatives 71st district Democratic primary election, 2012
Party	Candidate	Votes	%
Democratic	Evelyn Terry	3,463	51.34%
Democratic	Everette Witherspoon	3,282	48.66%
Total votes		6,745	100%

North Carolina House of Representatives 71st district general election, 2012
Party	Candidate	Votes	%
Democratic	Evelyn Terry	23,545	77.94%
Republican	Kris McCann	6,664	22.06%
Total votes		30,209	100%
Democratic hold			

North Carolina House of Representatives
Preceded by Larry Womble	Member of the North Carolina House of Representatives from the 71st district 2013–2023	Succeeded by Kanika Brown
