= Sam D. Bundy =

American politician from North Carolina (1906–1983)

Member of the North Carolina House of Representatives 8th district (1971–1983) 9th district (1983)
- In office January 1971 – January 19, 1983
- Preceded by: David Edward Reid Jr.
- Succeeded by: Walter B. Jones Jr.

Personal details
- Born: Samuel David Bundy; July 19, 1906 Farmville, North Carolina, U.S.
- Died: January 19, 1983 (aged 76) Raleigh, North Carolina, U.S.
- Cause of death: Heart attack
- Resting place: Forest Hills Cemetery, Raleigh, North Carolina, U.S.
- Party: Democratic
- Spouse: Bettie Elizabeth Spencer (m. 1936)
- Parent(s): James Turner Bundy; Huldah Jane Gay
- Education: Farmville High School
- Alma mater: Duke University; East Carolina University
- Profession: Politician, educator

Samuel David Bundy (July 19, 1906 – January 19, 1983) was an American politician and educator who served in the North Carolina House of Representatives, representing the 8th legislative district of North Carolina as a Democrat from 1971 to 1983. He also briefly represented the 9th legislative district of North Carolina until his death.

== Early life and education ==
Bundy was born in Farmville, North Carolina on July 19, 1906, to James Turner Bundy and Huldah Jane Gay. He graduated from Farmville High School in 1923. In 1927, Bundy received his bachelor's degree from Duke University. In 1948, he received his master's degree from East Carolina University.

== Career ==
Bundy served as principal of Sam D. Bundy Elementary School in Farmville, North Carolina.

Bundy served in the North Carolina House of Representatives from 1971 to 1983, representing the 8th (and later 9th) legislative district of North Carolina as a Democrat. Bundy represented the district alongside H. Horton Rountree and later Ed Warren.

Walter B. Jones Jr. was unanimously chosen by a four-member committee representing the counties of Greene and Pitt to fill the vacancy caused by Bundy's death in office.

== Personal life and death ==
Bundy married Bettie Elizabeth Spencer in Seaboard, North Carolina on December 26, 1936.

Bundy died at the age of 76 in a hospital in Raleigh, North Carolina after suffering a heart attack at a hotel restaurant. He was interred in Forest Hills Cemetery, located in Raleigh.

North Carolina House of Representatives
Preceded by David Edward Reid Jr.	Member of the North Carolina House of Representatives from the 8th district 1971–1983; Served alongside: H. Horton Rountree, Ed Warren	Succeeded by Josephus L. Mavretic; Allen Barbee; Thomas Hill Matthews; Jeanne Tucker Fenner
Preceded by Richard Ralph Grady; Martin Lancaster	Member of the North Carolina House of Representatives from the 9th district 1983; Served alongside: Ed Warren	Succeeded by Walter B. Jones Jr.
