= John Edwin Davenport =

American politician (1928–2024)

John Ed Davenport

Member of the North Carolina House of Representatives from the 7th district
- In office 1973–1979
- Preceded by: Allen Barbee
- Succeeded by: Roger W. Bone

Personal details
- Born: John Edwin Davenport; April 28, 1928
- Died: July 24, 2024 (aged 96)
- Party: Democratic
- Education: University of North Carolina; University of North Carolina School of Law

John Edwin Davenport (April 28, 1928 – July 24, 2024) was an American politician. He served as a Democratic member of the North Carolina House of Representatives.

== Life and career ==
Davenport was born on April 28, 1928. He attended the University of North Carolina and the University of North Carolina School of Law. Davenport served in the North Carolina House of Representatives from 1973 to 1979. He died on July 24, 2024, at the age of 96.
