= Edward Jones (North Carolina politician) =

American politician from North Carolina

Ed Jones
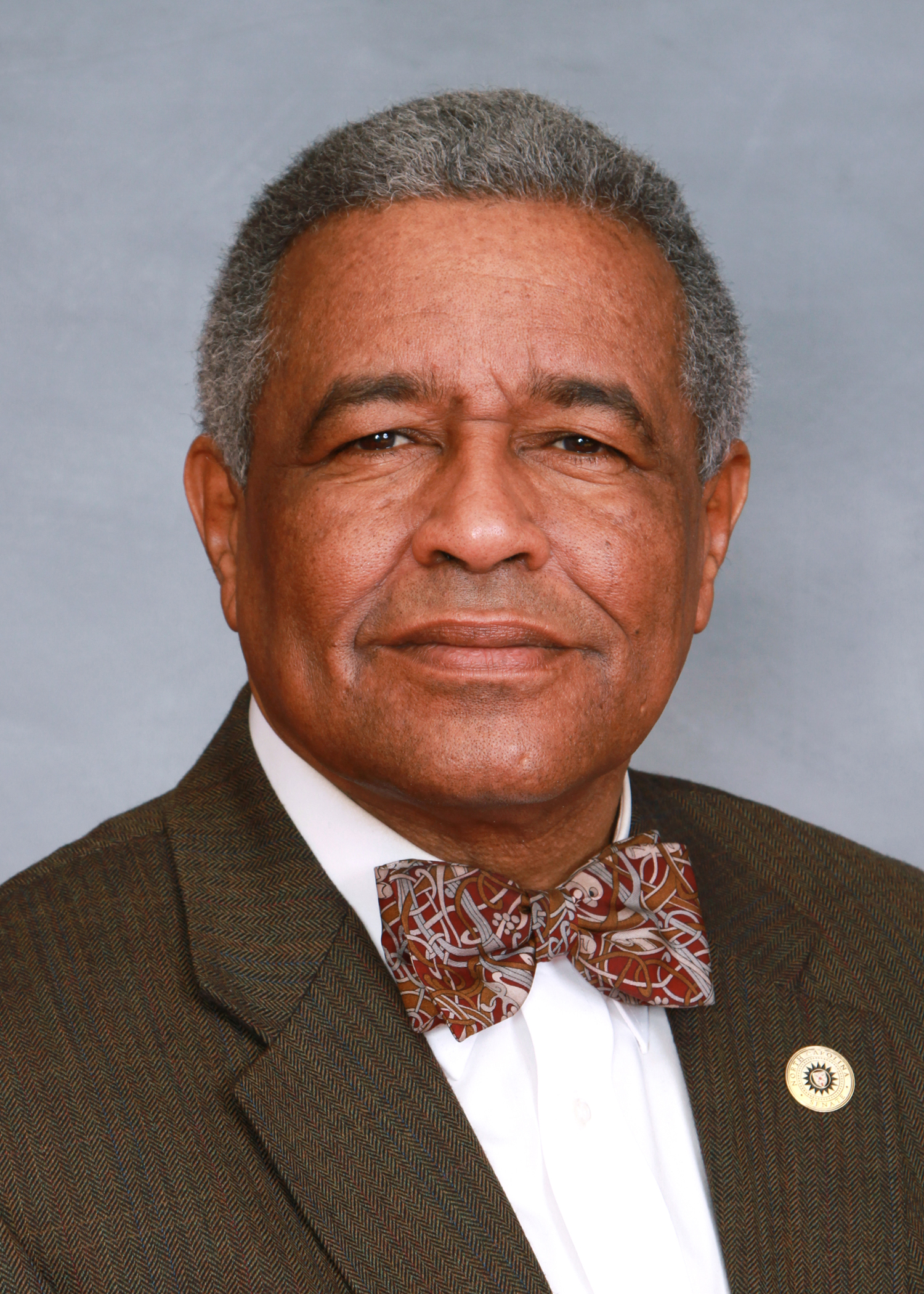
- Official portrait, 2011

Member of the North Carolina Senate from the 4th district
- In office January 23, 2007 – December 14, 2012
- Preceded by: Robert Holloman
- Succeeded by: Angela Bryant

Member of the North Carolina House of Representatives from the 7th district
- In office April 5, 2005 – January 23, 2007
- Preceded by: John Hall
- Succeeded by: Angela Bryant

Personal details
- Born: Edward Walter Jones; March 11, 1950
- Died: December 14, 2012 (aged 62) Halifax County, North Carolina
- Party: Democratic
- Spouse: Mary Ann Holden
- Education: Western Piedmont Community College
- Occupation: Police officer

Edward Walter Jones (March 11, 1950 – December 14, 2012) was a North Carolina Democratic politician who represented the state's 4th Senate district (including Bertie, Chowan, Gates, Halifax, Hertford, Northampton, and Perquimans counties) in the North Carolina Senate.

Jones served in the U.S. Army's 82nd Airborne Division and graduated from Western Piedmont Community College with a degree in police science. He served for 30 years as a state trooper with the North Carolina Highway Patrol and after his retirement served as chief of police in Enfield, North Carolina.

== Political career ==
Jones entered local politics when he was elected Mayor of Enfield. In 2005, he was appointed to the North Carolina House of Representatives to fill the vacancy caused by the death of state Rep. John D. Hall. He was elected by voters in the 7th district (Halifax and Nash counties) to a regular term in November 2006. But between his election to a full term and the opening of the legislative session in January 2007, state senator Robert L. Holloman died. Local Democratic Party leaders nominated Jones to fill Holloman's seat on January 18, 2007. Jones immediately resigned his House seat and was appointed by Governor Mike Easley to the Senate on January 23. Easley then appointed Angela R. Bryant to Jones's seat in the House. Jones was elected and re-elected to the Senate in 2008, 2010, and 2012. But one month after winning a new term in the 2012 election, Jones died at the age of 62, after suffering from pancreatic cancer. He died in Halifax County, North Carolina. A five-mile portion of US Highway 301 from the Edgecombe/Halifax County line through the Town of Enfield was renamed the "Senator Edward W. Jones Highway" in March 2018.

== Family ==
Jones was married to Mary Ann Holden of Wendell, North Carolina; they had two daughters.

North Carolina House of Representatives
Preceded by John Hall	Member of the North Carolina House of Representatives from the 7th District; 2005-2007	Succeeded by Angela Bryant
North Carolina Senate
Preceded by Robert Holloman	Member of the North Carolina Senate from the 4th district 2007–2012	Succeeded by Angela Bryant
