= Frank Ballance =

American politician and attorney (1942–2019)

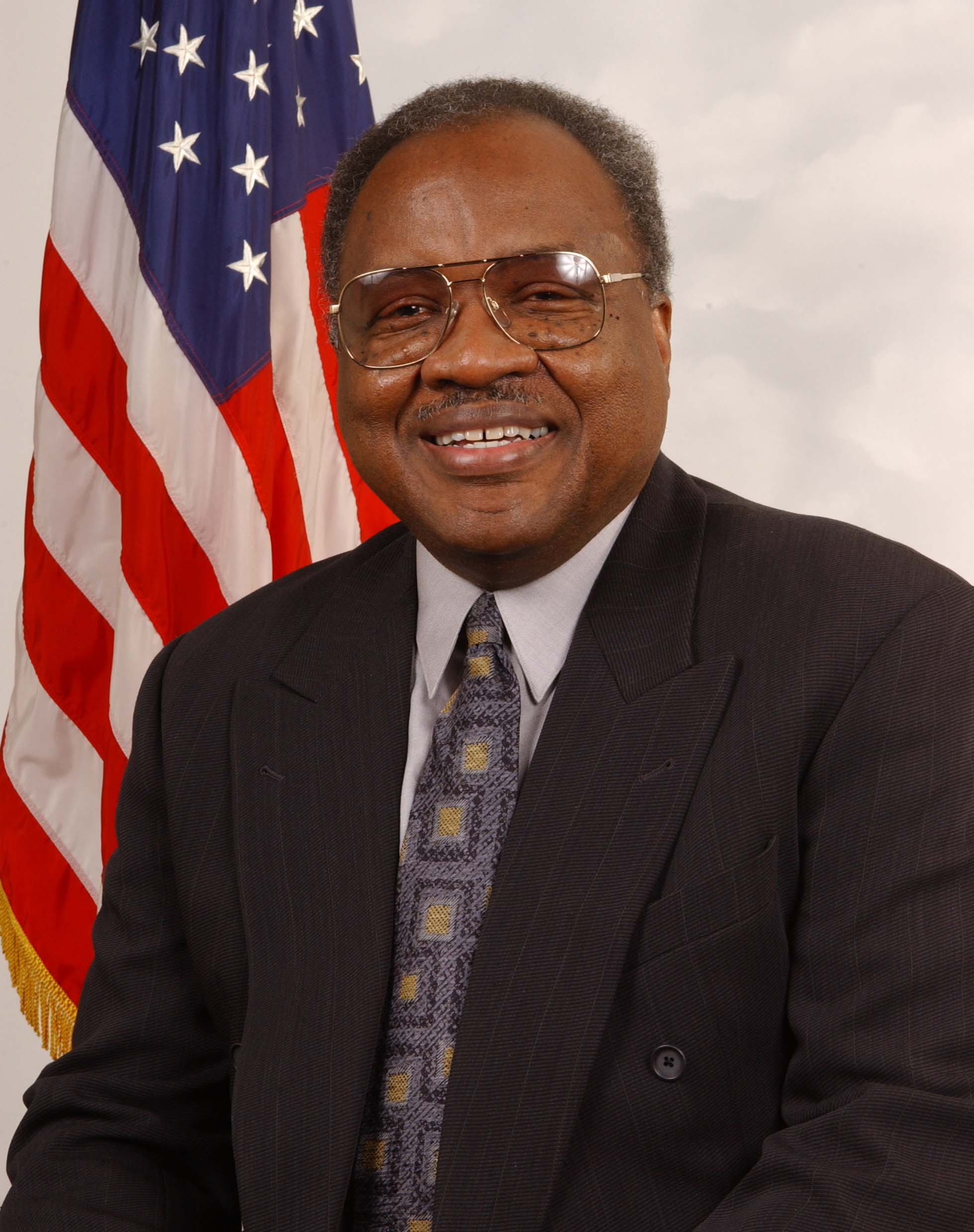
- Official portrait, 2002

Member of the U.S. House of Representatives from North Carolina's 1st district
- In office January 3, 2003 – June 8, 2004
- Preceded by: Eva Clayton
- Succeeded by: G. K. Butterfield

Member of the North Carolina Senate from the 2nd district
- In office January 1, 1989 – January 1, 2003
- Preceded by: Monk Harrington
- Succeeded by: Robert Lee Holloman (Redistricting)

Member of the North Carolina House of Representatives from the 7th district
- In office January 1, 1983 – January 1, 1987
- Preceded by: John Church; Thomas Ellis; William Watkins (Redistricting)
- Succeeded by: Thomas Hardaway

Personal details
- Born: Frank Winston Ballance Jr. February 15, 1942 Windsor, North Carolina, U.S.
- Died: February 22, 2019 (aged 77) Raleigh, North Carolina, U.S.
- Party: Democratic
- Spouse: Bernadine Smallwood (m. 1969)
- Children: 3
- Education: North Carolina Central University (BS, JD)

Military service
- Branch/service: United States Army
- Years of service: 1968–1971
- Unit: North Carolina National Guard

Frank Winston Ballance Jr. (February 15, 1942 – February 22, 2019) was an American politician and attorney who was a Democratic member of the United States House of Representatives from 2003 to 2004, representing North Carolina's 1st congressional district before resigning from his seat due to health issues.

In November 2004, Ballance pleaded guilty to one count of conspiracy to commit mail fraud and money laundering, and was sentenced to four years in prison, two years supervised release, and fined $10,000.

== Background ==
Ballance was born in Windsor, North Carolina. He graduated from W. S. Etheridge High School in 1959 and attended North Carolina Central University, earning a bachelor's degree in 1963 and a Juris Doctor degree in 1965.

After law school, Ballance briefly served as a faculty member of the South Carolina State University School of Law before entering private practice in 1966. He served in the North Carolina National Guard Reserve from 1968 to 1971.

== Political career ==
Ballance was first elected to the House of the state legislature in 1983 and served until 1986. In 1988, he was elected to the North Carolina Senate; that same year, he had served as chair of the Guilford County chapter of the NAACP. Ballance served in the state senate until 2002, including as deputy president pro tempore from 1997 to 2002. He was appointed to the Board of Trustees for both North Carolina Central University and Elizabeth City State University.

=== Congress ===
Ballance ran for and was elected to, the United States House of Representatives from North Carolina's 1st congressional district in 2002. After election to Congress, he served as the president of the 108th Congress's Democratic freshman class. Ballance served on the House Agriculture Committee and the House Small Business Committee.

On June 8, 2004, Ballance resigned from his seat due to health issues after being diagnosed with myasthenia gravis. Ballance's successor, G. K. Butterfield, was elected in a special election on July 20.

== Criminal convictions ==
On September 2, 2004, Ballance was indicted on federal charges including money laundering, mail fraud, and conspiracy to commit mail fraud. The charges arose after allegations were made that Ballance took $2.3 million in state funds he secured as a State Senator for the John A. Hyman Memorial Youth Foundation and used the cash for the enrichment of himself, his family, and his church.

On November 9, 2004, a plea agreement was reached under which Frank Ballance pleaded guilty to one count of conspiracy to commit mail fraud and money laundering. In January 2005, he was disbarred from the practice of law in the state of North Carolina. On October 12, 2005, he was sentenced to four years in prison, two years supervised release, and fined $10,000. He began serving his sentence at the medium-security federal prison in Butner, North Carolina, on December 30, 2005. According to the Federal Bureau of Prisons, he was released from prison in June 2009.

His son, Garey Ballance, a state district judge in Guilford County, North Carolina, was also charged. In addition, Garey Ballance was also charged in the indictment with income tax evasion. Garrey Ballance was convicted, served in prison and was disqualified from becoming a judge again.

== Personal life and death ==
Ballance married Bernadine Smallwood in 1969, and together, they had three children. Ballance died on February 22, 2019, from surgical complications at a Raleigh hospital.

== Federal electoral history ==
2002 North Carolina's 1st congressional district election
Party	Candidate	Votes	%
Democratic	Frank W. Ballance Jr.	93,157	63.74
Republican	Greg Dority	50,907	34.83
Libertarian	Mike Ruff	2,093	1.43
Total votes		146,157	100
Democratic hold			

== See also ==
- List of African-American United States representatives
- List of American federal politicians convicted of crimes
- List of federal political scandals in the United States

North Carolina House of Representatives
Preceded by Allen Barbee; Roger Bone; Jeanne Fenner; Josephus Mavretic	Member of the North Carolina House of Representatives from the 7th district 1983–1987	Succeeded by Thomas Hardaway
North Carolina Senate
Preceded by Monk Harrington	Member of the North Carolina Senate from the 2nd district 1989–2003	Succeeded by Scott Thomas
U.S. House of Representatives
Preceded by Eva Clayton	Member of the U.S. House of Representatives from North Carolina's 1st congressional district 2003–2004	Succeeded by G. K. Butterfield
