= North Carolina's 4th Senate district =

American legislative district

North Carolina's 4th State Senate district
Senator
Buck Newton; R–Wilson
- Demographics: 48% White; 34% Black; 13% Hispanic; 1% Asian; 4% Multiracial
- Population (2023): 216,675

North Carolina's 4th Senate district is one of 50 districts in the North Carolina Senate. It has been represented by Republican Buck Newton since 2023.

== Geography ==
Since 2023, the district has included all of Wilson, Wayne, and Greene counties. The district overlaps with the 4th, 10th, 12th, and 24th state house districts.

== District officeholders since 1967 ==
=== Multi-member district ===
Senator	Party	Dates	Notes	Senator	Party	Dates	Notes	Counties
Julian Russell Allsbrook (Roanoke Rapids)	Democratic	January 1, 1967 – January 1, 1973	Redistricted from the 8th district. Redistricted to the 6th district.	Herbert Vinson Bridgers (Tarboro)	Democratic	January 1, 1967 – January 1, 1969		1967–1973; All of Halifax, Edgecombe, Martin, and Pitt counties.
Julian Russell Allsbrook (Roanoke Rapids)	Democratic	January 1, 1967 – January 1, 1973	Redistricted from the 8th district. Redistricted to the 6th district.	Vernon White (Winterville)	Democratic	January 1, 1969 – January 1, 1973	Redistricted to the 6th district.	1967–1973; All of Halifax, Edgecombe, Martin, and Pitt counties.

=== Single-member district ===
Senator	Party	Dates	Notes	Counties
George Rountree III (Wilmington)	Republican	January 1, 1973 – January 1, 1975		1973–1983; All of New Hanover and Pender counties.
William Gray Smith (Wilmington)	Democratic	January 1, 1975 – January 1, 1979		1973–1983; All of New Hanover and Pender counties.
Benjamin David Schwartz (Wilmington)	Democratic	January 1, 1979 – January 1, 1981		1973–1983; All of New Hanover and Pender counties.
Julius Arnette Wright (Wilmington)	Republican	January 1, 1981 – January 1, 1983	Redistricted to the 7th district.	1973–1983; All of New Hanover and Pender counties.
Alexander Duke Guy (Jacksonville)	Democratic	January 1, 1983 – January 1, 1991		1983–1993; All of Onslow County.
B. Tommy Pollard (Jacksonville)	Republican	January 1, 1991 – January 1, 1993	Retired to run for Congress.	1983–1993; All of Onslow County.
John Codington (Wilmington)	Republican	January 1, 1993 – March 1, 1994	Died.	1993–2003; Parts of New Hanover, Pender, Onslow, and Carteret counties.
Vacant		March 1, 1994 – January 1, 1995		1993–2003; Parts of New Hanover, Pender, Onslow, and Carteret counties.
Patrick Ballantine (Wilmington)	Republican	January 1, 1995 – January 1, 2003	Redistricted to the 9th district.	1993–2003; Parts of New Hanover, Pender, Onslow, and Carteret counties.
Robert Holloman (Ahoskie)	Democratic	January 1, 2003 – January 8, 2007	Died.	2003–2005; All of Warren, Halifax, Northampton, Hertford, and Gates counties. Part of Vance County.
Robert Holloman (Ahoskie)	Democratic	January 1, 2003 – January 8, 2007	Died.	2005–2013; All of Halifax, Northampton, Bertie, Hertford, Gates, Chowan, and Perquimans counties.
Vacant		January 8, 2007 – January 23, 2007		2005–2013; All of Halifax, Northampton, Bertie, Hertford, Gates, Chowan, and Perquimans counties.
Ed Jones (Enfield)	Democratic	January 23, 2007 – December 14, 2012	Appointed to finish Holloman's term. Died.	2005–2013; All of Halifax, Northampton, Bertie, Hertford, Gates, Chowan, and Perquimans counties.
Vacant		December 14, 2012 – January 7, 2013		2005–2013; All of Halifax, Northampton, Bertie, Hertford, Gates, Chowan, and Perquimans counties.
Vacant		December 14, 2012 – January 7, 2013		2013–2019; All of Vance, Warren, and Halifax counties. Parts of Nash and Wilson counties.
Angela Bryant (Rocky Mount)	Democratic	January 7, 2013 – March 17, 2018	Appointed to finish Jones's term. Resigned.	2013–2019; All of Vance, Warren, and Halifax counties. Parts of Nash and Wilson counties.
Vacant		March 17, 2018 – March 23, 2018		2013–2019; All of Vance, Warren, and Halifax counties. Parts of Nash and Wilson counties.
Toby Fitch (Wilson)	Democratic	March 23, 2018 – January 1, 2023	Appointed to finish Bryant's term. Lost re-election.	2013–2019; All of Vance, Warren, and Halifax counties. Parts of Nash and Wilson counties.
Toby Fitch (Wilson)	Democratic	March 23, 2018 – January 1, 2023	Appointed to finish Bryant's term. Lost re-election.	2019–2023; All of Halifax, Edgecombe, and Wilson counties.
Buck Newton (Wilson)	Republican	January 1, 2023 – Present		2023–Present; All of Wilson, Wayne, and Greene counties.

== Election results ==
=== 2024 ===
North Carolina Senate 4th district general election, 2024
Party	Candidate	Votes	%
Republican	Buck Newton (incumbent)	55,389	55.12%
Democratic	Raymond Smith Jr.	45,096	44.88%
Total votes		100,485	100%
Republican hold			

=== 2022 ===
North Carolina Senate 4th district Democratic primary election, 2022
Party	Candidate	Votes	%
Democratic	Toby Fitch (incumbent)	6,994	54.48%
Democratic	Raymond Smith Jr.	5,843	45.52%
Total votes		12,837	100%

North Carolina Senate 4th district Republican primary election, 2022
Party	Candidate	Votes	%
Republican	Buck Newton	8,728	67.61%
Republican	Joe Democko	4,181	32.39%
Total votes		12,909	100%

North Carolina Senate 4th district general election, 2022
Party	Candidate	Votes	%
Republican	Buck Newton	38,638	57.51%
Democratic	Toby Fitch (incumbent)	28,543	42.49%
Total votes		67,181	100%
Republican gain from Democratic			

=== 2020 ===
North Carolina Senate 4th district general election, 2020
Party	Candidate	Votes	%
Democratic	Toby Fitch (incumbent)	51,384	57.16%
Republican	Sammy Davis Webb	38,514	42.84%
Total votes		89,898	100%
Democratic hold			

=== 2018 ===
North Carolina Senate 4th district general election, 2018
Party	Candidate	Votes	%
Democratic	Toby Fitch (incumbent)	36,471	57.77%
Republican	Richard Scott	25,391	40.22%
Libertarian	Jesse Shearin	1,264	2.00%
Total votes		63,126	100%
Democratic hold			

=== 2016 ===
North Carolina Senate 4th district Democratic primary election, 2016
Party	Candidate	Votes	%
Democratic	Angela Bryant (incumbent)	24,063	81.19%
Democratic	James E. Mills	5,576	18.81%
Total votes		29,639	100%

North Carolina Senate 4th district general election, 2016
Party	Candidate	Votes	%
Democratic	Angela Bryant (incumbent)	56,584	67.67%
Republican	Richard Scott	27,038	32.33%
Total votes		83,622	100%
Democratic hold			

=== 2014 ===
North Carolina Senate 4th district general election, 2014
Party	Candidate	Votes	%
Democratic	Angela Bryant (incumbent)	37,590	65.50%
Republican	Richard Scott	19,796	34.50%
Total votes		57,386	100%
Democratic hold			

=== 2012 ===
North Carolina Senate 4th district general election, 2012
Party	Candidate	Votes	%
Democratic	Ed Jones (incumbent)	63,666	72.32%
Republican	Warren Scott Nail	24,363	27.68%
Total votes		88,029	100%
Democratic hold			

=== 2010 ===
North Carolina Senate 4th district Democratic primary election, 2010
Party	Candidate	Votes	%
Democratic	Ed Jones (incumbent)	14,000	82.41%
Democratic	Tee Ferguson	2,988	17.59%
Total votes		16,988	100%

North Carolina Senate 4th district Republican primary election, 2010
Party	Candidate	Votes	%
Republican	Rich Halbert	984	52.93%
Republican	Warren Scott Nail	875	47.07%
Total votes		1,859	100%

North Carolina Senate 4th district general election, 2010
Party	Candidate	Votes	%
Democratic	Ed Jones (incumbent)	29,169	62.55%
Republican	Rich Halbert	17,464	37.45%
Total votes		46,633	100%
Democratic hold			

=== 2008 ===
North Carolina Senate 4th district general election, 2008
Party	Candidate	Votes	%
Democratic	Ed Jones (incumbent)	57,429	100%
Total votes		57,429	100%
Democratic hold			

=== 2006 ===
North Carolina Senate 4th district general election, 2006
Party	Candidate	Votes	%
Democratic	Robert Holloman (incumbent)	19,091	69.67%
Republican	Kenneth R. "Ken" Chandler	8,312	30.33%
Total votes		27,403	100%
Democratic hold			

=== 2004 ===
North Carolina Senate 4th district Democratic primary election, 2004
Party	Candidate	Votes	%
Democratic	Robert Holloman (incumbent)	8,846	47.35%
Democratic	Patricia Ferguson	5,560	29.76%
Democratic	Sammy D. Webb	4,278	22.90%
Total votes		18,684	100%

North Carolina Senate 4th district general election, 2004
Party	Candidate	Votes	%
Democratic	Robert Holloman (incumbent)	44,249	100%
Total votes		44,249	100%
Democratic hold			

=== 2002 ===
North Carolina Senate 4th district Democratic primary election, 2002
Party	Candidate	Votes	%
Democratic	Robert Holloman	8,142	31.61%
Democratic	Robert B. Partin	6,950	26.99%
Democratic	Ronnie C. Reaves	5,133	19.93%
Democratic	Clinton G. "T-Bone" Alston	3,040	11.80%
Democratic	Charles J. Worth	2,490	9.67%
Total votes		25,755	100%

North Carolina Senate 4th district general election, 2002
Party	Candidate	Votes	%
Democratic	Robert Holloman	28,336	84.11%
Libertarian	Tom Eisenmenger	5,352	15.89%
Total votes		33,688	100%
Democratic hold			

=== 2000 ===
North Carolina Senate 4th district Republican primary election, 2000
Party	Candidate	Votes	%
Republican	Patrick Ballantine (incumbent)	10,620	69.87%
Republican	Leroy Sullivan	4,580	30.13%
Total votes		15,200	100%

North Carolina Senate 4th district general election, 2000
Party	Candidate	Votes	%
Republican	Patrick Ballantine (incumbent)	47,469	65.27%
Democratic	Louise McColl	25,258	34.73%
Total votes		72,727	100%
Republican hold			
