= John D. Hall (politician) =

American politician

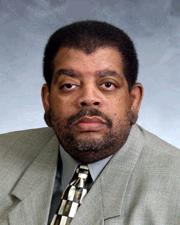
Rep. John Hall

John Douglas Hall (January 18, 1957 – March 17, 2005) was an American politician, and a Democratic member of the North Carolina General Assembly. He represented the state's seventh House district, including constituents in Halifax and Nash counties. A radio station owner from Scotland Neck, North Carolina, Hall graduated from Scotland Neck High School in 1975 and went to Lenoir Community College. Hall served on the Halifax County Board of Commissioners and on the Scotland Neck City Council. Hall served 3.5 terms in the state House. He died while serving on March 17, 2005. North Carolina Governor Mike Easley appointed Ed Jones to fulfill the remainder of Hall's two-year term.
