= Jack Hunt (politician) =

American politician (1922–2020)

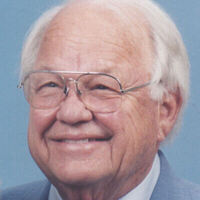
- Jack Hunt

Member of the North Carolina House of Representatives
- In office 1973–1995

Personal details
- Born: November 27, 1922 Lattimore, North Carolina
- Died: May 27, 2020 (aged 97)
- Party: Democratic Party
- Spouse: Ruby Hunt

John Jackson Hunt (November 27, 1922 – May 27, 2020) was an American politician who served as a member of the North Carolina House of Representatives from 1973 to 1995.

== Background ==
Hunt was born in Lattimore, North Carolina, he was the fourth and last child of Robert Lee and Alma (née Harrill) Hunt. He graduated from Lattimore High school in 1939. He served in the United States Army from 1943 to 1948 and from 1950 to 1952 and was commissioned a major. He graduated with a bachelor's degree from Wake Forest University in 1943 and with a degree in dentistry from Emory University in 1948. He was a dentist, a farmer, and a building materials supplier. Hunt was a Democrat.
