= Edgar Toppin =

American historian

Edgar Allan Toppin
- Born: January 22, 1928; Harlem, New York, United States
- Died: December 8, 2004 (aged 76); Ettrick, Virginia, United States
- Education: Howard University, B.A. (1949), M.A. (1950) History; Northwestern University, Ph.D. History (1955)
- Occupations: Professor, Author, Historian
- Employer(s): Virginia State University; Dean of the Graduate School (1979–1993); Professor of History (1964–2003); Virginia Commonwealth University Visiting Professor of History (1993–2003)
- Known for: A distinguished scholar, numerous publications in intellectual, business, American and African-American history
- Board member of: Colonial Williamsburg Foundation (1982–1996); National Park Service (1975–1980); Association for the Study of Afro-American Life and History, President – (1974–1976); Virginia Historical Society (1989–1994); Black History Museum and Cultural Center (19XX–19XX); National Historical Publications and Records Commission (1972–1978)
- Spouse: Antionette Toppin
- Children: Edgar Allan Toppin, Jr. (1954–1971); Avis Bent; Louise Toppin

Edgar Allan Toppin, Sr. (January 22, 1928 – December 8, 2004) was an African-American professor of history, and an author who specialized in Civil War, Reconstruction and African-American history. He spent the majority of his 40+ year teaching career at Virginia State University, and wrote ten books on the subjects of American and African-American history. He served on several historical boards including the National Park Service, Colonial Williamsburg Foundation and Association for the Study of Afro-American Life and History, the later serving as president. As president, he was instrumental in turning Black History Week into Black History Month in 1976.

== Early years ==
He was born in Harlem, New York to immigrants Maude Catherine Joel (Bermuda) and Vivien Leopold Toppin (Grenada). He was the second of six children; Lucille, George, Mary, Sammy, Eleanor (in birth order). Named after writer Edgar Allan Poe, he had a passion for reading and learning. He would often escape to the roof of his apartment building on 114th Street and read in order to nurture his yearning for knowledge. His family was poor, and growing up during the Great Depression was especially hard. His wardrobe of white shirts and navy blue pants was a symbol of poverty so recognizable that "when you walked into a place, people could spot you a mile away," he recalls.

At age 16, he attended New York City College and after one semester, enrolled at Howard University on scholarship. He received his B.A. 1949 and M.A. 1950 in History and was a member of Alpha Phi Alpha fraternity, Beta Chapter (Spring 1948). He went on to study at Northwestern University earning his Ph.D. in History in 1955 and was named a William Randolph Hearst Fellow and a John Hay Whitney Opportunity Fellow.

== Teaching career ==
In 1964, Toppin began his teaching career at Virginia State University (VSU). In the mid-1960s, he created Americans from Africa, an educational 30 lesson television course, that aired on Richmond's public TV station and was later aired across the country. In 1966, Toppin was the first African-American member admitted to the Virginia Historical Society and in 1989, would become the first African-American member of the board of trustees.

Toppin played an integral role in turning Black History Week into Black History Month in 1976 while serving as President of the Association for the Study of Afro-American Life and History. In 1975, he was the first African American appointed to the National Park Service's Advisory Board on National Parks, Historic Sites, Buildings, and Monuments and later served on the board of Colonial Williamsburg. Back at Virginia State University, he was he was appointed Dean of the Graduate School in 1979 and later served as provost and vice president of academic affairs of the university from 1987 to 1989.

In 1992, Toppin was honored in the Dominion series Strong Men & Women - Excellence in Leadership that honors African-American "positive role models and demonstrate leadership in their chosen field" and "someone whose achievements have made an imprint upon some facet of national or local life". The series has honored such individuals as Colin Powell, Mae Jemison, Michael Jordan, Thurgood Marshall, Maya Angelou, Oprah Winfrey and Reginald Lewis (a former student of his). In December 1999, the Surry County, Virginia, Historical Society and Museums called Dr. Toppin, "one of the greatest living authorities on African-American history. [who] spoke on the Civil War and the little understood post-war period of Reconstruction".

On December 8, 2004, Toppin died of heart failure at the age of 76. He is buried at Blandford Cemetery in Petersburg, Virginia, beside his son, Edgar Toppin, Jr. Toppin once said, "I hope people would remember me for my humaneness, for being kindly to both colleagues, staff and students; for seeing the worth and potential in each person, no matter who it is or their background." In 2005, VSU established the Edgar A. Toppin Endowment Fund.

== Publications ==
- Edgar A. Toppin, "Negro Emancipation in Historic Retrospect: Ohio, the Negro Suffrage Issue in Postbellum Ohio Politics", Journal of Human Relations, XI, 1963, 232–246
- Edgar A. Toppin, "Humbly They Served: The Black Brigade in the Defense of Cincinnati", Journal of Negro History, XLVIII, 1963, 75–97. (About the Black Brigade of Cincinnati.)
- Lavinia G Dobler and Edgar A. Toppin, Pioneers and patriots: the lives of six Negroes of the Revolutionary era, Garden City, N.Y.: Doubleday, 1965. OCLC 310488.
- Drisko, Carol F and Edgar A. Toppin, The Unfinished March the History of the Negro in the United States Reconstruction to World War I , New York, 1967. ISBN 0-385-04705-3
- Edgar A. Toppin, Blacks in America: then and now. Illustrations by Gene Langley. Boston: The Christian Science Publishing Society, 1969. ISBN B0007DECN6
- Edgar A. Toppin, A Mark Well Made: The Negro contribution to American culture, Chicago: Rand McNally, 1969
- Edgar A. Toppin, A Biographical History of Blacks in America Since 1528, New York: David McKay Company, Inc., 1971. ISBN 978-0-679-30014-4
- Edgar A. Toppin, The Black American in United States History, Boston: Allyn and Bacon, Inc., 1973. ISBN 978-0-205-03303-4
- The World and Its People: The United States and Its Neighbors, Silver Burdett, 1982. ISBN 978-0-382-02833-5
- Edgar A. Toppin, Opening day centennial: A century of service at Virginia State University, 1883 to 1983, CPS Systems, Virginia State University, 1983
- Virginia History and Government, 1850 to the present, Silver Burdett, 1986. ISBN 978-0-382-08116-3
- Val Arnsdorf, Timothy Helmus, Norman Pounds, Edgar A. Toppin, The United States Yesterday And Today, Silver Burdett, 1988, ISBN 0-382-08409-8
- Edgar A. Toppin, Setting the Record Straight: African American History, Colonial Williamsburg (Spring 1990): 10–12
- Edgar A. Toppin, Loyal Sons and Daughters: Virginia State University 1882 to 1992, Norfolk: Pictorial Heritage Publishing Company, 1992. ISBN 978-1-880373-00-2
- Edgar A. Toppin, African Americans in the Confederacy, in Encyclopedia of the Confederacy, 1993, pg. 4–9
- Edgar A. Toppin, Scott, Emmett Jay, American National Biography. February 2000.
- Edgar A. Toppin, "Ulysses Simpson Grant", in Melvin I. Urofsky (ed.), The American Presidents, New York: Garland Pub., 2000, p. 185.

== Other work ==
- Edgar Toppin and Benjamin Quarles, The black man in the Civil War, Format: [Sound recording], discussion of the impact of emancipation, the black desire to fight against slavery, and the influence of Frederick Douglass in assisting black participation in the war.
- Edgar A. Toppin and John Hope Franklin, Reconstruction & the black codes, discussion of the reconstruction. Format: [sound recording]: Author: Toppin, Edgar Allan, Publisher: North Hollywood, CA: Center for Cassette Studies, Date: c1971.

== Awards and honors ==
- named Distinguished Virginian by Gov. Linwood Holton
- 1992, Strong Men & Women – Excellence in Leadership Honoree, Dominion
- 1994, Scholar Awards, Virginia Social Science Association
- 1995, Outstanding Faculty Award for teaching excellence, Virginia State Council of Higher Education
- 2003, distinguished professor emeritus, Virginia State University
