= Jim Ezzell =

American politician

James Earl Ezzell Jr. (6 September 1936 – 30 January 1991) was an American politician from North Carolina.

Ezzell was physically disabled from birth and could not walk without the use of mobility aids, frequently utilizing crutches or a motorized cart. Before running for public office, Ezzell was a solicitor. Politically, Ezzell was a Democrat from Nash County who served in the North Carolina House of Representatives from 1977 to 1981, and as a member of the North Carolina Senate from 1985 to his death. In his first term as a state representative, he expressed opposition to the death penalty in cases of rape. Ezzell died in a single-car road incident on 30 January 1991, when the vehicle he was driving struck a bridge abatement near downtown Raleigh. He was ejected from the vehicle, which rolled onto him. His wife Patsy, was a passenger, and not severely injured.
