= McLawhorn =

McLawhorn is a surname. Notable people with the surname include:

- Charles McLawhorn (1927–2000), American politician
- Marian N. McLawhorn (fl. 1998–2013), American politician
- Troy McLawhorn (born 1968), American musician, songwriter, and record producer
