= American Gothic (1995 TV series) =

American horror television series

- Genre: Horror; Supernatural; Drama
- Created by: Shaun Cassidy
- Starring: Gary Cole; Lucas Black; Paige Turco; Brenda Bakke; Sarah Paulson; Jake Weber; Nick Searcy
- Composer: Joseph LoDuca
- Country of origin: United States
- Original language: English
- No. of seasons: 1
- No. of episodes: 22

Production
- Executive producers: Sam Raimi; Robert Tapert
- Producers: Shaun Cassidy; Steve DeJarnatt; David Eick; David Kemper; Edward Ledding
- Cinematography: Ernest Holzman (pilot only); Stephen McNutt
- Editors: Pietro Scalia (pilot only); Chris Innis; Brian L. Chambers; Tom Moore; Bob Murawski (title sequence & recaps)
- Camera setup: Single-camera
- Running time: 45 minutes
- Production companies: Renaissance Pictures; Universal Television

Original release
- Network: CBS
- Release: September 22, 1995 – July 11, 1996

American Gothic is an American horror television series created by Shaun Cassidy and starring Gary Cole, Lucas Black, Paige Turco, Brenda Bakke, Sarah Paulson, Jake Weber, and Nick Searcy. It focuses on a small South Carolina town ruled by a sheriff who uses demonic powers to control residents. The series features a number of recurring and non-recurring guest stars, including Bruce Campbell, Amy Steel, Pat Hingle, Evan Rachel Wood, Veronica Cartwright, and Danny Masterson.

Executive-produced by Sam Raimi and Rob Tapert, the series first aired on CBS on September 22, 1995, and was cancelled after a single season on July 11, 1996. The series received positive reviews and has been regarded as a cult classic.

== Plot ==
The story takes place in the fictional town of Trinity, South Carolina, and revolves around Caleb Temple and the town's corrupt sheriff, Lucas Buck. Though appearing affable and charismatic, Sheriff Buck is a murderous rapist whose power base is backed by apparent supernatural powers, which he generally uses to manipulate people to "fulfill their potential" and make life-changing choices (usually for evil).

Caleb Temple is a normal child whose paternity masks a horrific secret: Lucas Buck is his biological father, having raped his mother in front of Caleb's older sister Merlyn. The horror of watching her mother being sexually assaulted caused Merlyn to become severely emotionally traumatized and withdrawn from the rest of the world, made even worse when her mother committed suicide after giving birth to Caleb.

During the pilot episode of the series, Sheriff Buck murders Merlyn in cold blood and manipulates Caleb's "father" into committing suicide in order to eliminate Caleb's family and claim his biological son for his own. The newly arrived Dr. Crower begins to uncover the sheriff's role in the deaths of Merlyn and Merlyn's father and with help from Caleb's out-of-town cousin Gail Emory, struggles to prevent Lucas from corrupting young Caleb. They are aided in part by Merlyn's ghost, who personally appears before Caleb throughout the series in order to try to keep him from Buck's corrupt grasp.

== Cast of characters ==
=== Main cast ===
- Gary Cole as Lucas Buck, the local sheriff who holds fear over the town of Trinity and uses occult forces to manipulate residents. He seeks to adopt Caleb, his biological son, and raise him in his image. Cole appears in all 22 episodes.
- Lucas Black as Caleb Temple, an orphan often tempted by Lucas, his biological father, to join him, but, with help from the ghost of his sister, Merlyn, he usually does the right thing. Black appears in all 22 episodes.
- Paige Turco as Gail Emory, a journalist who was raised in Trinity. Her parents died in a mysterious fire in the Trinity newspaper editing room. She returns to Trinity to take care of her cousin Caleb and to uncover the truth about her parents' deaths. Turco appears in all episodes except "Potato Boy", "Resurrector", and "Inhumanitas".
- Brenda Bakke as Selena Coombs, a promiscuous local schoolteacher who dates Lucas, and who assists him in his endeavours. Bakke appears in all episodes, except "Strong Arm of the Law", "The Beast Within", and "Strangler".
- Sarah Paulson as Merlyn Temple, Caleb's sister who is murdered by Lucas, but occasionally appears to Caleb in the form of a ghost to guide him in the right direction and away from Lucas Buck. Paulson appears in all episodes, except "Strong Arm of the Law", "The Beast Within", "Ring of Fire", and "Doctor Death Takes a Holiday".
- Jake Weber as Matt Crower, a Harvard-trained doctor and outsider to Trinity with a shady past. He takes Caleb in after the death of Caleb's father. Weber appears in all episodes except "Inhumanitas", "Learning to Crawl", "Echo of Your Last Goodbye", "Strangler", "Triangle", "The Buck Stops Here", and "Requiem".
- Nick Searcy as Ben Healy, Lucas's subservient deputy who is fearful of his superior. Searcy appears in all episodes, except "Damned If You Don't", "Meet the Beetles", "To Hell and Back", and "Rebirth".

=== Recurring cast ===
- Chris Fennell as Boone Mackenzie
- John Mese as Dr. Billy Peale
- Alex Van as Deputy Floyd
- Lynda Clark as Rita Barber
- Tina Lifford as Loris Holt
- Michael Burgess as Dr. Daniel Truelane
- Robin Mullins as Nurse Stacie Erichfreund
- Amy Dawn Anderson as Nurse
- Sarah Lynn Moore as Mrs. Carol Russell
- Troy Simmons as Josh Davenport
- Evan Rachel Wood as Rose Russell
- Tammy Christine Arnold as Judith Temple

Note: The character of Dr. Billy Peale (John Mese) was a late addition to the series, intended to be a regular character to replace Dr. Matt Crower as a more formidable adversary to Lucas Buck. He was added to the opening credits in the episode "Doctor Death Takes a Holiday", in which Dr. Crower is written out. Producer Shaun Cassidy stated in interviews that Dr. Crower would have returned had the show been renewed for a second season.

== Episodes ==
CBS originally aired American Gothic in a differing sequence than the production order and omitted four episodes ("Potato Boy", "Ring of Fire", "Echo of Your Last Goodbye" and "Strangler") from its network broadcast. Subsequent, syndicated airings of the series reinstated these four episodes.

No.	Title	Directed by	Written by	Original release date	Prod. code	DVD order
1	"Pilot"	Peter O'Fallon	Shaun Cassidy	September 22, 1995	83587	001
Caleb Temple's 10th birthday turns nightmarish when his sister, Merlyn Temple, is killed and his father, Gage Temple, is the prime suspect. Gage's guilt seems confirmed when he commits suicide in his jail cell, leaving Caleb an orphan... except for the ghost of Merlyn. Caleb seems to find a father figure in Dr. Matt Crower, but this won't last if Sheriff Lucas Buck has any say in the matter. Guest starring: Sonny Shroyer as Gage Temple, Margo Moorer as Danielle Davenport, Lucius Houghton as Deputy Cammalous, Tammy Arnold as Judith Temple, McKenzie LaCross as 6 Yr. Old Merlyn, Leonard Watkins as Blind Man, Tamara Dow as Nurse Wendy, Storm Bear as Carnival Pirate
2	"A Tree Grows in Trinity"	Michael Katleman	Shaun Cassidy	September 29, 1995	K0601	002
Fleeing deep into the woods from Sheriff Lucas Buck, young Caleb takes refuge in an eerie, abandoned hunting lodge and is terrified when he discovers a dying man who has been tortured and is being held prisoner there. Also, Lucas sends a horrifying message to coroner Curtis Z. Webb via Webb's precious goat Eli. Guest starring: Arnold Vosloo as Rafael "SOL" Santo, Ron Perkins as Harlan Jeeters, David Lenthall as Dr. Curtis Z. Webb, Gina Stewart as Teapot, Eli the Goat as himself, Mert Hatfield as The Reverend, Sean Bridgers as Deputy #1, Charles McLawhorn as Albert, Dale Wright as Nurse, Charly Williams as Taylor Webb, Ralph Brownewell as Orderly #1
3	"Eye of the Beholder"	Jim Charleston	Story by : Shaun Cassidy & Judi Ann Mason; Teleplay by : Judi Ann Mason	October 6, 1995	K0602	003
Sheriff Buck calls in a favor from the local judge, Harrison Halpern who is overseeing Caleb's custody hearing, hoping to ensure his favored status, but he doesn't stop there. Guest starring: N'Bushe Wright as Cheryl Trulane, Bob Hannah as Judge Halpern, Rick Warner as Heywood Anderson, Grenoldo Frazier as Reverend Logan, Barry Bell as Gordy Wills, Maria Howell as Choir Soloist
4	"Damned If You Don't"	Lou Antonio	Michael R. Perry & Stephen Gaghan	October 10, 1995	K0604	004
Junkyard owner Carter Bowen panics when Sheriff Buck wants his teenage daughter, Poppy, to work for him as payback for an old favor. When he refuses, his life quickly begins to unravel and the past comes back to haunt him. Not only does the past haunt him, it helps destroy his wife Etta. Guest starring: Muse Watson as Wash Sutpen, Brigid Walsh as Poppy Bowen, Steve Rankin as Carter Bowen, Judy Simpson Cook as Etta Bowen, Barnaby Carpenter as T.J., John Henry Scott as Janitor, Donald S. Bland as Cooper, Juliet Cesario as Gail's Mother, Jana Drue as Young Gail
5	"Dead to the World"	James A. Contner	Robin Green, Mitchell Burgess, Shaun Cassidy, Michael R. Perry & Stephen Gaghan	October 13, 1995	K0605	005
Gail may have pushed Sheriff Buck too far when she accuses him of foul play in the death of his former girlfriend, who was with him just before her car mysteriously drove off a bridge. Lucas also has a horrific intervention when Waylon Flood is confronted by Ben for being abusive to his son and ex-wife. Guest starring: Helen Baldwin as Barbara Joy Flood, Barnaby Carpenter as T.J., Melissa McBride as Holly Gallager, Lee Norris as Benji Healy, Linda Pierce as Mrs. Gallagher, Scott Schumacher as Diver, Rachel Seidman-Lockamy as Charlotte, John Shearin as Waylon Flood, Debbie Yates as Louellen
6	"Meet the Beetles"	Michael Nankin	Teleplay by : Victor Bumbalo & David Chisholm; Story by : Shaun Cassidy & Victor Bumbalo & David Chisholm	October 20, 1995	K0603	007
When Jack Drey, a South Carolina state police lieutenant, throws his weight around in the investigation of the disappearance of his adulterous brother-in-law, Hack Weller, Sheriff Buck becomes wary. Drey suspects that Weller's obsession with Selena might have driven a vicious Buck to kill him. Guest starring: Bruce Campbell as Lt. Jack Drey, Keith Flippen as Ossie Spichtig, Mark Joy as Coach Fred Bender, David Lenthall as Dr. Curtis Z. Webb, Selden Smith as Lydia Constantine, Derin Altay as Betty Weller
7	"Strong Arm of the Law"	Mike Binder	Michael R. Perry & Stephen Gaghan	November 3, 1995	K0608	008
Sheriff Lucas Buck gets revenge, in his own chilling fashion, on four men who move to Trinity and set off a crime wave, causing the local residents to start losing faith in his control. Special Guest Star Richard Edson as Lowell Stokes Guest starring: Matt Craven as Barrett Stokes, Joseph Lindsey as Earl McKeever, Jim Gloster as Just Eddie, Richard Edson as Lowell Stokes, Dean Whitworth as Cecil Perkins, Aubrey Dollar as Janice, Mert Hatfield as Minister, Brian Fong as Paramedic, Maggie Klekas as Mourner #1, Sara Audrey Keeley as Mourner #2
8	"Rebirth"	James Frawley	Teleplay by : Victor Bumbalo & Robert Palm; Story by : Victor Bumbalo	January 3, 1996	K0610	011
Merlyn borrows an unborn child's spirit and reappears as Halle. Both Lucas and Caleb realize what has happened, and while Lucas tries to keep Merlyn in his world, Caleb knows she must return the spirit to the baby before it's too late. Guest starring: Danny Masterson as Ray, Amy Steel as Christy, Chris Blackwelder as Young Man, Kelly Mizell as Young Woman, Deborah K. Winstead as Nurse #1, Lanelle Markgraf as Nurse #2, Michael Mattison as Dead Head, Randell Haynes as Sourpuss
9	"Resurrector"	Elodie Keene	Shaun Cassidy, Michael R. Perry & Stephen Gaghan	January 10, 1996	K0614	013
Radio talk show host Mel Kirby approaches Lucas for help in bringing his show to television. When Lucas refuses, Mel and his co-anchor wife, Gloria, vow to ruin Lucas. Meanwhile, a depressed Caleb decides he wants to give Merlyn a second funeral enlisting Boone and Joney Keith to help. Guest starring: Greg Travis as Mel Kirby, Irene Ziegler as Gloria Kirby, Philip Loch as Lance Biggs, Andrea Powell as Jean Biggs, Craig Edwards as Technician
10	"Inhumanitas"	Bruce Seth Green	Stephen Gaghan & Michael R. Perry	January 17, 1996	K0615	014
Lucas may have corrupted the local priest, Father Tilden, and he may be able to take his revenge on townspeople who cross his path. But not even he can control the seemingly miraculous activities of the dead Merlyn, determined to make Lucas answer for his crimes. Lucas also seeks revenge against a lawyer who won a big settlement against the sheriff's department. Lucas also shows his softer side in helping old Bertie, a blind man. Guest starring: Pat Hingle as Father Tilden, Tim Grimm as W. Bryan Hudson, Ruth Reid as Barbara Hudson, Wayne DeHart as Bertie, Yvonne Graetzer as Female Realtor, Brandlyn Whitaker as Sue Ellen Hudson, Peter Townes as Frenchman
11	"The Plague Sower"	Mel Damski	Robert Palm	January 24, 1996	K0606	015
A sudden, mysterious bleeding illness quickly spreads through Trinity, causing death and devastation, as well as the arrival of a new doctor, Dr. Peele. As the townspeople fall victim to the plague, Matt suffers a breakdown and Lucas turns to Dr. Peele for help. Guest starring: Michael Harding as A.E. Tippett, Patt Noday as Reporter, Margo Moorer as Danielle Davenport, Joe Maggard as Townsperson #1, Haley Salyer as Woman, Dottie Grissom-Hardin as Young Woman, Gene Dann as Man, C.K. Bibby as Townsperson #2, John Henry Scott as Husband, Kay Joyner as Wife
12	"Doctor Death Takes a Holiday"	Doug Lefler	Victor Bumbalo	January 31, 1996	K0617	016
Dr. Matt decides to re-investigate the murder of Merlyn. He also is curious when a woman checks into his hospital as Mrs. Smith. She begins to tell Matt all about the evil of Lucas and how she wants to kill him. Guest starring: Veronica Cartwright as Angela, Will Leskin as Judge Streeter, Tamara Burnham as Charlotte Streeter, Nancy Saunders as Brenda, Amy Parrish as Nurse Sarah, Tyrone Hicks as Jojo, Henry Laurence as Elderly Man, Bill Roberson as Carl
13	"The Beast Within"	Michael Lange	Shaun Cassidy	July 3, 1996	K0611	010
Artie, Ben Healy's brother, holds-up a local store in Trinity for a cheap watch. Ben and Lucas respond to the robbery and Ben accidentally shoots Artie. Artie, injured but still conscious, takes Lucas hostage, including Caleb and Gail. Guest starring: Jeff Perry as Artie Healy, Rick Forrester as Salesman, Henry Laurence as Elderly Man, General Fermon Judd Jr. as Fireman
14	"To Hell and Back"	Oz Scott	Judi Ann Mason & Robert Palm	July 3, 1996	K0607	009
Dr. Matt struggles with his alcoholism and the death of his family. Lucas tries to push him over the edge by offering him a drink and forcing the bizarre memories of his wife and daughter. Guest starring: W. Morgan Sheppard as Mr. Emmett, Andi Carnick as Lily Crower, Robert Treveiler as Chester Langston, Megan Gallacher as Claire Crower, Laura Robbins as Doreen Langston, Charles McLawhorn as George, Michael Genevie as Dr. Portis Fields, Charlotte Hackman as Hannah, Charles Lucas as Bluesman, Erica Nashan as Nurse #1, Lanelle Rose as Nurse #2, Carlene Moore as Waitress, Lou Criscuolo as Cop #1, Mick McGovern as Cop #2
15	"Learning to Crawl"	Michael Lange	Teleplay by : David Kemper & Robert Palm; Story by : David Kemper	July 4, 1996	K0618	017
Lucas and Caleb forge a bond when facing matters of life and death. After Caleb is electrocuted and dies at the hospital, Lucas steps in and brings the boy back to life. Guest starring: Ted Raimi as Ted Parker, Stuart Greer as Cody Parker, Regan Forman as Jeri McIntyre, Wallace Merck as Rolston
16	"Triangle"	James Frawley	Jeff King & Robert Palm	July 10, 1996	K0619	020
Upon Gail's announcement, she faints in Lucas' office and is taken to the hospital where she is told that she is pregnant. Gail threatens to have an abortion and even attempts to kill herself because she knows that she is carrying the evil offspring of Lucas Buck. Guest starring: Deacon Dawson as Pilot, Russell Deats as Little Luke, James Frawley as Bartender
17	"The Buck Stops Here"	Lou Antonio	Steve De Jarnatt	July 10, 1996	K0623	021
Yancy can't find certain files and believes Lucas has them. Billy and Selena go to Lucas' house to look for the missing files and end up making love in Lucas' bed. Guest starring: Jim Antonio as Dr. Leslie Narone, Brent Jennings as Yancy Lydon, Dani Miller as Nurse, Lee Freeman as Doris Lydon, Dean Whitworth as Cecil Spurgeon, John Shearin as Waylon Flood, Wayne DeHart as Old Bertie
18	"Requiem"	Lou Antonio	Shaun Cassidy	July 11, 1996	K0624	022
Caleb is trying to find the full potential of his powers by attempting to kill Gail, leaving him sole heir of Lucas' will. But, when Lucas finds out what Caleb is up to, he attempts to save Gail. Lucas offers Dr. Narone a chilling ultimatum. Lucas and Caleb have an evil face-off. After the horrible incident that happened, Gail winds up at the hospital in a coma, and Lucas was very worried about Gail at that moment. During that time, Gail did recover and survived from being attacked from Caleb. Guest starring: Jim Antonio as Dr. Leslie Narone, Lindley Mayer as Ashley Narone, Don Henderson Baker as Grave Digger, Len Hathaway as Elderly Man, Diana Taylor as Businesswoman, Mary McMillan as Wealthy Woman, Craig Shoemaker
19	"Potato Boy"	Nick Marck	Michael Nankin	Unaired	K0609	006
Selena reaches out to Caleb and tries to help him with his schoolwork. She begins to spend extra time with him, which bothers Lucas. Selena also tries to reconcile with her father. Lucas also teaches Loris Holt a lesson when she tries to forbid Caleb from going out with him. Guest starring: John Bennes as Rev. Coombs, Trip Cogburn as Potato Boy, Zander Heinen as Potato Boy Vocalist (voice), Joe Inscoe as Dr. Perry
20	"Ring of Fire"	Lou Antonio	Michael R. Perry & Stephen Gaghan	Unaired	K0613	012
Through dreams and visions, Lucas allows Gail to learn bit by bit what happened to her parents. She learned that her father was abusing her and her mother was having an affair with Gage Temple, Caleb's father. Guest starring: Collin Wilcox Paxton as Mrs. Gardner, Sonny Shroyer as Gage Temple, Sandi Fix as Christine Emory (1975), John Keenan as Peter Emory (1975), Jana Drue as Young Gail, Dorothy Recasner Brown as Female Doctor, David Cutting as Toddler
21	"Echo of Your Last Goodbye"	Oz Scott	John Cork	Unaired	K0620	018
Candy leads Ben to a house, which turns out to be the place that Judith Temple used to help abandoned children. With Gail they discover drawings from the young children as well as several drawings of Lucas done with a great amount of love by Judith. Guest starring: Tanya Rollins as Tina, Julia Deane Howard as Cindy, D.L. Anderson as Allison, Tammy Arnold as Judith Temple
22	"Strangler"	Doug Lefler	Teleplay by : Michael R. Perry & Stephen Gaghan & Robert Palm; Story by : Michael R. Perry & Stephen Gaghan	Unaired	K0622	019
Lucas calls on the ghost of Albert DeSalvo, the "Boston Strangler", to come to Merlyn. Lucas leaves town to attend a convention, and DeSalvo decides to do more than just try to kill Merlyn. Guest starring: Gareth Williams as Albert DeSalvo, Amy Parrish as Nurse Sarah, Sean Bridgers as Policeman #1, Rachel Lewis as Nurse #2

== Home media ==
Universal Studios released the complete series of American Gothic on DVD as a Region 1 NTSC double-sided 3-disc set in the United States on October 25, 2005. A Region 2 PAL single-sided 6-disc set in Europe was released March 20, 2006.

The Region 1 and Region 2 DVD sets have the episodes in the same order (by air date as opposed to producer's intended order). The only exception is the German boxset (released October 5, 2007 by Koch Media Home Entertainment), which features all episodes in the intended order on seven DVDs. The orders are as follows:

Region 1 Release	Region 2 Release (UK)	Episodes	Region 2 Release (Germany)	Episodes
Disc 1, Side A	Disc 1	1. "Pilot" (46:48) # *; 2. "A Tree Grows in Trinity" (46:37); 3. "Eye of the Beholder" (46:54); 4. "Damned If You Don't" (45:58)	Disc 1	1. "Pilot" (44:43) # *; 2. "A Tree Grows in Trinity" (44:23); 3. "Eye of the Beholder" (44:46)
Disc 1, Side B	Disc 2	1. "Dead to the World" (45:17); 2. "Meet the Beetles" (45:53); 3. "Strong Arm of the Law" (44:17); 4. "Rebirth" (46:13)	Disc 2	1. "Damned If You Don't" (43:55); 2. "Dead To The World" (43:12); 3. "Potato Boy" (42:40)
Disc 2, Side A	Disc 3	1. "Resurrector" (46:06); 2. "Inhumanitas" (44:12); 3. "The Plague Sower" (45:56); 4. "Doctor Death Takes a Holiday" (45:32) *	Disc 3	1. "Meet The Beetles" (43:47); 2. "Strong Arm Of The Law" (42:16); 3. "To Hell And Back" (42:19) *
Disc 2, Side B	Disc 4	1. "The Beast Within" (44:35); 2. "To Hell and Back" (44:33) *; 3. "Learning to Crawl" (45:48) *; 4. "Triangle" (45:59) *	Disc 4	1. "The Beast Within" (42:20); 2. "Rebirth" (43:59); 3. "Ring Of Fire" (43:46) *
Disc 3, Side A	Disc 5	1. "The Buck Stops Here" (44:26) *; 2. "Requiem" (45:15) *; 3. "Potato Boy" (44:55)	Disc 5	1. "Resurrector" (43:57); 2. "Inhumanitas" (42:04); 3. "The Plague Sower" (43:45)
Disc 3, Side B	Disc 6	1. "Ring of Fire" (46:02) *; 2. "Echo of Your Last Goodbye" (46:03) *; 3. "Strangler" (44:11)	Disc 6	1. "Doctor Death Takes A Holiday" (43:16) *; 2. "Learning To Crawl" (43:37) *; 3. "Echo Of Your Last Goodbye" (43:44) *
# Bonus Materials include optional Audio Commentary for this episode. * Bonus Materials include non-integrated deleted and/or extended scene(s) for this episode.			Disc 7	1. "Strangler" (42:00); 2. "Triangle" (43:45) *; 3. "The Buck Stops Here" (42:12) *; 4. "Requiem" (42:58) *

== Reception ==
=== Critical response ===
American Gothic received mixed reviews from critics at the time of its release, with some declaring it one of the best new series of 1995, while others derided it for its violent content and "uneven" storylines.

In retrospect, Gary Cole said: "American Gothic was ahead of its time. Audiences were asked to root for the devil, a dark and sinister hero. Now there's nothing but anti-social, bad lead characters. Back then in the mid-90s we were always getting notes from the network about its being "interesting, but how do we root for this character?"

=== Accolades ===
Award/association	Year	Category	Recipient(s) and nominee(s)	Result	Ref.
Artios Award	1996	Outstanding Achievement in Dramatic Pilot Casting	Marc Hirschfeld; Michael A. Katcher; Meg Liberman	Nominated	
Cinema Audio Society Awards	1996	Outstanding Achievement in Sound Mixing for a Television Series	John Asman; Sam Black; David E. Fluhr; Richard Van Dyke (Note: For episode "Damned If You Don't".)	Nominated	
Primetime Emmy Awards	1996	Outstanding Individual Achievement in Sound Mixing for a Drama Series	John Asman; Sam Black; David E. Fluhr; Richard Van Dyke	Nominated	
Saturn Awards	1996	Best Genre Television Series	American Gothic	Nominated	
YoungStar Awards	1997	Best Performance by a Young Actor in a Drama TV Series	Lucas Black	Nominated	

== Ratings ==
Over the course of the series' first three episodes, American Gothic was watched by approximately 8 million viewers in the United States. Between September 18 and October 8, 1995, it ranked as the fifth most-viewed CBS series on television.

Beginning December 8, 1995, the series was shelved from its Friday night slot following a decline in ratings. The series returned to CBS as part of their Wednesday night programming on January 3, 1996.
