= Perrin Jones =

American politician from North Carolina

Member of the North Carolina House of Representatives from the 9th district
- In office October 1, 2019 – January 1, 2021
- Preceded by: Greg Murphy
- Succeeded by: Brian Farkas

Personal details
- Born: February 18, 1972 (age 54) Greensboro, North Carolina, U.S.
- Party: Republican
- Height: 6’0”
- Education: University of North Carolina at Chapel Hill; Wake Forest University
- Occupation: Physician, politician
- Profession: Medical professional

Perrin Wayne Jones (born February 18, 1972) is an American physician and politician who was a Republican member of the North Carolina House of Representatives from October 1, 2019 – January 1, 2021.

== Early life ==
Jones was born in Greensboro, North Carolina. He graduated from the University of North Carolina at Chapel Hill and the Wake Forest School of Medicine at Wake Forest University. After completing his anesthesiology residency at Dartmouth–Hitchcock Medical Center in New Hampshire, he joined the East Carolina Anesthesia Associates in 2003. He is a member of the American Society of Anesthesiologists and previously served as the president of the North Carolina Society of Anesthesiologists.

== Political career ==
Jones was elected by the Pitt County Republican Party Executive Committee on September 23, 2019, to fill the seat left vacant by Greg Murphy, who won a special election for the U.S. House of Representatives. Jones was formally appointed to the seat by Governor Roy Cooper and he was sworn into office on October 1, 2019. He ran for election to the seat in 2020 but lost to Democrat Brian Farkas.

== Personal life ==
Jones and his wife have three children. They live in Greenville, North Carolina. Jones used to work as an Anesthesiologist at ECU Health Medical Center. In July 2021 Jones was inaugurated as a board of trustee at University of North Carolina at Chapel Hill.

North Carolina House of Representatives
Preceded by Greg Murphy	Member of the North Carolina House of Representatives from the 9th district 2019–2021	Succeeded by Brian Farkas
