= Claire Kempner =

American politician

Member-elect of the North Carolina House of Representatives from the 9th district
- Assuming office January 2027
- Succeeding: Timothy Reeder

Personal details
- Party: Democratic

Claire Kempner is an American politician. A member of the Democratic Party, she is the member-elect for the 9th district of the North Carolina House of Representatives.
