= North Carolina's 9th House district =

American legislative district

North Carolina's 9th State House of Representatives district
Representative
Timothy Reeder; R–Ayden
- Demographics: 61% White; 25% Black; 9% Hispanic; 2% Asian; 3% Multiracial
- Population (2024): 87,938

North Carolina's 9th House district is one of 120 districts in the North Carolina House of Representatives. It has been represented by Republican Timothy Reeder since 2023.

== Geography ==
Since 2003, the district has included part of Pitt County. The district overlaps with the 5th Senate district.

== District officeholders ==
=== Multi-member district ===
Representative	Party	Dates	Notes	Representative	Party	Dates	Notes	Counties
District created January 1, 1967.
I. Joseph Horton (Snow Hill)	Democratic	January 1, 1967 – January 1, 1969	Redistricted from the Greene County district.	Guy Elliott (Kinston)	Democratic	January 1, 1967 – January 1, 1971	Redistricted from the Lenoir County district.	1967–1973; All of Greene, Lenoir, and Jones counties.
Daniel Lilley (Kinston)	Democratic	January 1, 1969 – January 1, 1973	Redistricted to the 3rd district.	Guy Elliott (Kinston)	Democratic	January 1, 1967 – January 1, 1971	Redistricted from the Lenoir County district.	1967–1973; All of Greene, Lenoir, and Jones counties.
Daniel Lilley (Kinston)	Democratic	January 1, 1969 – January 1, 1973	Redistricted to the 3rd district.	Harold Hardison (Deep Run)	Democratic	January 1, 1971 – January 1, 1973	Redistricted to the 3rd district and retired to run for the State Senate.	1967–1973; All of Greene, Lenoir, and Jones counties.
Nancy Chase (Eureka)	Democratic	January 1, 1973 – January 1, 1979	Redistricted from the 10th district.	W. P. "Bill" Kemp Jr. (Goldsboro)	Democratic	January 1, 1973 – January 1, 1975	Redistricted from the 10th district.	1973–1983; All of Wayne County.
Nancy Chase (Eureka)	Democratic	January 1, 1973 – January 1, 1979	Redistricted from the 10th district.	Henson Barnes (Goldsboro)	Democratic	January 1, 1975 – January 1, 1977	Retired to run for the State Senate.	1973–1983; All of Wayne County.
Nancy Chase (Eureka)	Democratic	January 1, 1973 – January 1, 1979	Redistricted from the 10th district.	Richard Grady (Seven Springs)	Democratic	January 1, 1977 – January 1, 1983	Redistricted to the 11th district.	1973–1983; All of Wayne County.
Martin Lancaster (Goldsboro)	Democratic	January 1, 1979 – January 1, 1983	Redistricted to the 11th district.	Richard Grady (Seven Springs)	Democratic	January 1, 1977 – January 1, 1983	Redistricted to the 11th district.	1973–1983; All of Wayne County.
Ed Warren (Greenville)	Democratic	January 1, 1983 – January 1, 1991	Redistricted from the 8th district. Retired to run for the State Senate.	Sam Bundy (Farmville)	Democratic	January 1, 1983 – January 19, 1993	Redistricted from the 8th district. Died.	1983–1993; All of Greene County. Part of Pitt County.
Ed Warren (Greenville)	Democratic	January 1, 1983 – January 1, 1991	Redistricted from the 8th district. Retired to run for the State Senate.	Vacant		January 19, 1983 – January 31, 1993		1983–1993; All of Greene County. Part of Pitt County.
Ed Warren (Greenville)	Democratic	January 1, 1983 – January 1, 1991	Redistricted from the 8th district. Retired to run for the State Senate.	Walter B. Jones Jr. (Farmville)	Democratic	January 31, 1983 – January 1, 1993	Appointed to finish Bundy's term. Redistricted to the single-member district and retired to run for Congress.	1983–1993; All of Greene County. Part of Pitt County.
Charles McLawhorn (Winterville)	Democratic	January 1, 1991 – January 1, 1993	Redistricted to the single-member district.	Walter B. Jones Jr. (Farmville)	Democratic	January 31, 1983 – January 1, 1993	Appointed to finish Bundy's term. Redistricted to the single-member district and retired to run for Congress.	1983–1993; All of Greene County. Part of Pitt County.

=== Single-member district ===
Representative	Party	Dates	Notes	Counties
Charles McLawhorn (Winterville)	Democratic	January 1, 1993 – January 1, 1995	Redistricted from the multi-member district. Lost re-election.	1993–2003; Parts of Greene and Pitt counties.
Henry Aldridge (Greenville)	Republican	January 1, 1995 – January 1, 1999	Lost re-election.	1993–2003; Parts of Greene and Pitt counties.
Marian McLawhorn (Grifton)	Democratic	January 1, 1999 – January 1, 2013	Lost re-election.	1993–2003; Parts of Greene and Pitt counties.
Marian McLawhorn (Grifton)	Democratic	January 1, 1999 – January 1, 2013	Lost re-election.	2003–Present; Parts of Pitt County.
Brian Brown (Greenville)	Republican	January 1, 2013 – October 6, 2015	Resigned.	2003–Present; Parts of Pitt County.
Vacant		October 6, 2015 – October 19, 2015		2003–Present; Parts of Pitt County.
Greg Murphy (Greenville)	Republican	October 19, 2015 – September 17, 2019	Appointed to finish Brown's term. Resigned to assume seat in Congress.	2003–Present; Parts of Pitt County.
Vacant		September 17, 2019 – October 1, 2019		2003–Present; Parts of Pitt County.
Perrin Jones (Greenville)	Republican	October 1, 2019 – January 1, 2021	Appointed to finish Murphy's term. Lost re-election.	2003–Present; Parts of Pitt County.
Brian Farkas (Greenville)	Democratic	January 1, 2021 – January 1, 2023	Lost re-election.	2003–Present; Parts of Pitt County.
Timothy Reeder (Ayden)	Republican	January 1, 2023 – Present		2003–Present; Parts of Pitt County.

== Election results ==
=== 2026 ===
North Carolina House of Representatives 9th district Democratic primary election, 2026
Party	Candidate	Votes	%
Democratic	Claire Kempner	4,797	67.21%
Democratic	Lenton Brown	2,340	32.79%
Total votes		7,137	100%

North Carolina House of Representatives 9th district general election, 2026
Party	Candidate	Votes	%
Republican	Timothy Reeder (incumbent)		
Democratic	Claire Kempner		
Total votes			100%

=== 2024 ===
North Carolina House of Representatives 9th district Democratic primary election, 2024
Party	Candidate	Votes	%
Democratic	Claire Kempner	3,624	70.95%
Democratic	Lenton Brown	1,484	29.05%
Total votes		5,108	100%

North Carolina House of Representatives 9th district Republican primary election, 2024
Party	Candidate	Votes	%
Republican	Timothy Reeder (incumbent)	6,919	78.70%
Republican	Tony Moore	1,873	21.30%
Total votes		8,792	100%

North Carolina House of Representatives 9th district general election, 2024
Party	Candidate	Votes	%
Republican	Timothy Reeder (incumbent)	26,888	55.95%
Democratic	Claire Kempner	21,173	44.05%
Total votes		48,061	100%
Republican hold			

=== 2022 ===
North Carolina House of representatives 9th district Republican primary election, 2022
Party	Candidate	Votes	%
Republican	Timothy Reeder	3,318	57.93%
Republican	Tony Moore	2,410	42.07%
Total votes		5,728	100%

North Carolina House of Representatives 9th district general election, 2022
Party	Candidate	Votes	%
Republican	Timothy Reeder	15,212	50.59%
Democratic	Brian Farkas (incumbent)	14,858	49.41%
Total votes		30,070	100%
Republican gain from Democratic			

=== 2020 ===
North Carolina House of representatives 9th district Democratic primary election, 2020
Party	Candidate	Votes	%
Democratic	Brian Farkas	5,466	62.34%
Democratic	Jake Hochard	3,302	37.66%
Total votes		8,768	100%

North Carolina House of representatives 9th district general election, 2020
Party	Candidate	Votes	%
Democratic	Brian Farkas	19,198	51.16%
Republican	Perrin Jones (incumbent)	18,329	48.84%
Total votes		37,527	100%
Democratic gain from Republican			

=== 2018 ===
North Carolina House of Representatives 9th district general election, 2018
Party	Candidate	Votes	%
Republican	Greg Murphy (incumbent)	17,234	59.96%
Democratic	Kris Rixon	11,510	40.04%
Total votes		28,744	100%
Republican hold			

=== 2016 ===
North Carolina House of representatives 9th district Democratic primary election, 2016
Party	Candidate	Votes	%
Democratic	Brian Farkas	5,394	61.63%
Democratic	Walter E. Gaskins	3,358	38.37%
Total votes		8,752	100%

North Carolina House of representatives 9th district general election, 2016
Party	Candidate	Votes	%
Republican	Greg Murphy (incumbent)	22,869	57.35%
Democratic	Brian Farkas	17,007	42.65%
Total votes		39,876	100%
Republican hold			

=== 2014 ===
North Carolina House of representatives 9th district Republican primary election, 2014
Party	Candidate	Votes	%
Republican	Brian Brown (incumbent)	3,134	71.68%
Republican	Ashley Bleau	1,238	28.32%
Total votes		4,372	100%

North Carolina House of representatives 9th district general election, 2014
Party	Candidate	Votes	%
Republican	Brian Brown (incumbent)	13,474	60.07%
Democratic	Uriah Ward	8,957	39.93%
Total votes		22,431	100%
Republican hold			

=== 2012 ===
North Carolina House of representatives 9th district Republican primary election, 2012
Party	Candidate	Votes	%
Republican	Brian Brown	3,702	60.43%
Republican	Jack Wall	2,424	39.57%
Total votes		6,126	100%

North Carolina House of representatives 9th district general election, 2012
Party	Candidate	Votes	%
Republican	Brian Brown	19,780	51.48%
Democratic	Marian McLawhorn (incumbent)	18,644	48.52%
Total votes		38,424	100%
Republican gain from Democratic			

=== 2010 ===
North Carolina House of representatives 9th district general election, 2010
Party	Candidate	Votes	%
Democratic	Marian McLawhorn (incumbent)	11,808	50.75%
Republican	Stan Larson	11,460	49.25%
Total votes		23,268	100%
Democratic hold			

=== 2008 ===
North Carolina House of representatives 9th district general election, 2008
Party	Candidate	Votes	%
Democratic	Marian McLawhorn (incumbent)	24,916	62.27%
Republican	Ginny Cooper	15,094	37.73%
Total votes		40,010	100%
Democratic hold			

=== 2006 ===
North Carolina House of representatives 9th district general election, 2006
Party	Candidate	Votes	%
Democratic	Marian McLawhorn (incumbent)	8,424	56.75%
Republican	Tony Moore	6,419	43.25%
Total votes		14,843	100%
Democratic hold			

=== 2004 ===
North Carolina House of representatives 9th district general election, 2004
Party	Candidate	Votes	%
Democratic	Marian McLawhorn (incumbent)	18,775	100%
Total votes		18,775	100%
Democratic hold			

=== 2002 ===
North Carolina House of Representatives District 9th district general election, 2002
Party	Candidate	Votes	%
Democratic	Marian McLawhorn (incumbent)	10,957	64.94%
Republican	Judy Eagle	5,715	33.87%
Libertarian	Deb Seksay	201	1.19%
Total votes		16,873	100%
Democratic hold			

=== 2000 ===
North Carolina House of Representatives 9th district Democratic primary election, 2000
Party	Candidate	Votes	%
Democratic	Marian McLawhorn (incumbent)	5,870	84.24%
Democratic	Robert Wheeler Jr.	1,098	15.76%
Total votes		6,968	100%

North Carolina House of Representatives 9th district general election, 2000
Party	Candidate	Votes	%
Democratic	Marian McLawhorn (incumbent)	14,167	54.81%
Republican	Wayne Holloman	11,683	45.20%
Total votes		25,850	100%
Democratic hold			
