= Judi Ann Mason =

American dramatist

- Born: February 2, 1955; Bossier City, Louisiana, United States
- Died: July 8, 2009 (aged 54); Los Angeles, California, USA
- Education: Grambling State University
- Occupations: Author, playwright, Producer, Film executive
- Writing career
- Period: 1975-2009
- Notable works: Livin' Fat, A Star Ain't Nothin' But a Hole in Heaven, The Cornbread Man, Good Times
- Notable awards: Norman Lear Award for Comedy; Lorraine Hansberry Playwriting Award

Judi Ann Mason (February 2, 1955 – July 8, 2009) was an American television writer, producer and playwright.

== Background ==
Mason was born in Bossier City, Louisiana on February 2, 1955. She excelled in English and became interested in playwrighting while in high school. Her professional writing career began while a drama student at Grambling State University.

== Career ==
While attending Grambling, she won the Norman Lear Award for comedy writing from the Kennedy Center for the Performing Arts for her play, Livin’ Fat. The following year she won the Lorraine Hansberry Playwriting Award for A Star Ain’t Nothin’ But A Hole In Heaven. The New York Times said that Mason had created "captivating characters" in her play, but that she had forfeited letting main character Pokie face the decision between romance and a better life, when the character's boyfriend ends up joining the war in Vietnam.

Mason was selected as one of Glamour Magazine's Top Ten College women in 1977, as was her friend Sheryl Lee Ralph, an actress.

Mason began her professional writing career in New York city where she was a member of the NEC (Negro Ensemble Company). She has taught playwriting and screenwriting at a number of colleges and universities for more than 20 years. In 2010 she was teaching screenwriting at Columbia College of Hollywood.

Her television writing credits include Good Times, Sanford and Son, A Different World, Beverly Hills, 90210, I'll Fly Away, American Gothic, Generations, and Guiding Light.

Her film credits include Sister Act 2: Back in the Habit. She is also renowned for Sophie and the Moonhanger, nominated for the Emmy Award/CableACE Award. Her stageplay credits include The Cornbread Man and Indigo Blues.

Mason counted Patti LaBelle, LaTanya Richardson, Jennifer Holliday and Jheryl Busby as personal friends. She is the one who gave Patti LaBelle her first acting credit on TV on the show A Different World.

She was a mother of two, daughter Mason Synclaire Williams and son Austin Barrett Williams. Mason died unexpectedly of a ruptured abdominal aorta on July 8, 2009.
