= Brian Farkas =

American politician

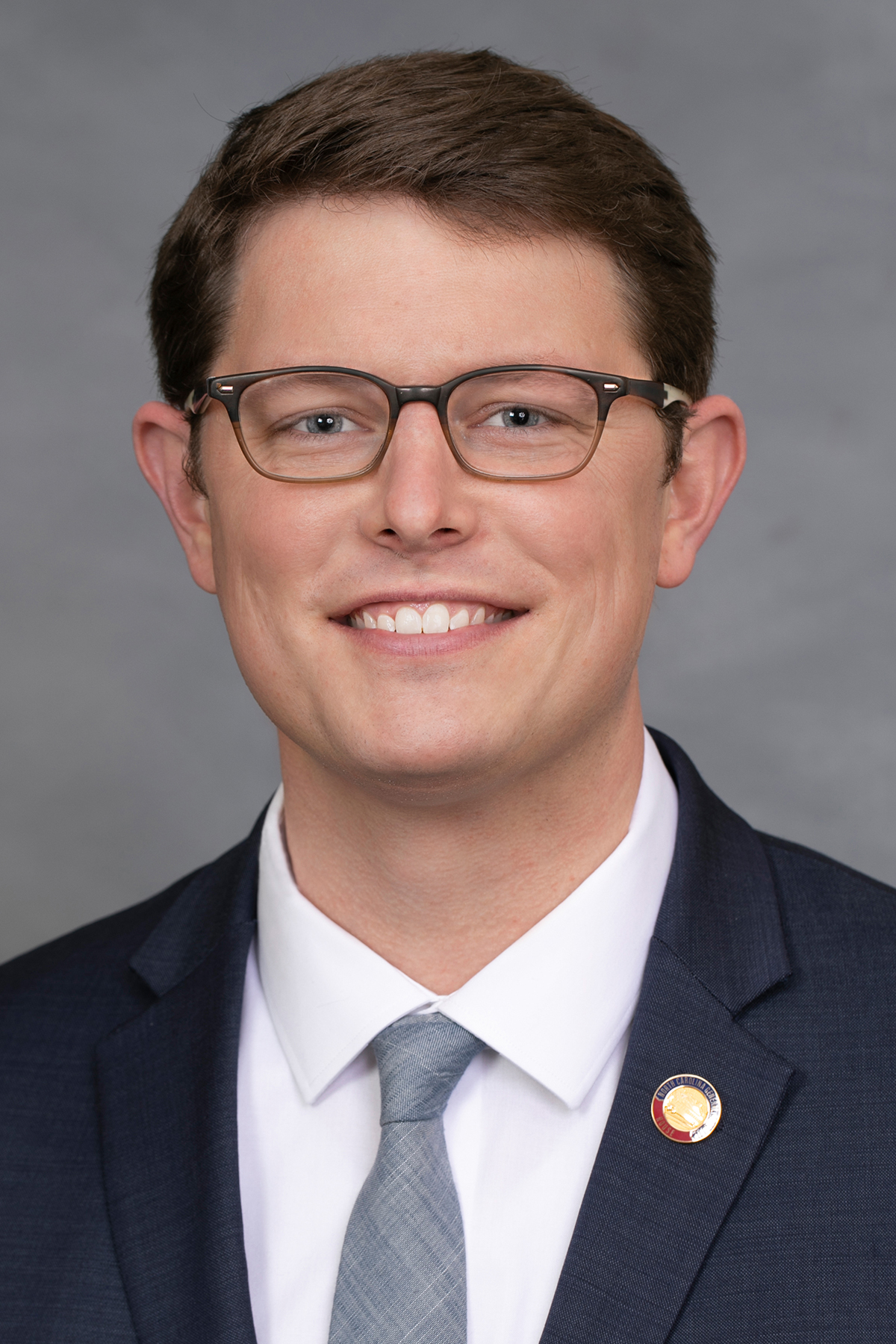
- Official portrait, 2021

Member of the North Carolina House of Representatives from the 9th district
- In office January 1, 2021 – January 1, 2023
- Preceded by: Perrin Jones
- Succeeded by: Timothy Reeder

Personal details
- Born: Brian Austin Farkas; August 14, 1987 (age 39)
- Party: Democratic
- Education: University of North Carolina at Charlotte (BA), University of North Carolina at Chapel Hill (MPA)
- Website: brianfarkas.com

Brian Austin Farkas (born August 14, 1987) is an American politician and former State Representative who served District 9 in the North Carolina House of Representatives.

== Early life and education ==
Farkas was raised in Pitt County, and attended J.H. Rose High School in Greenville. Following graduation, he attended the University of North Carolina at Charlotte, where he earned a Bachelor of Arts in political science, and a minor in Economics. Farkas worked for three years within the administrative division of the United States Attorney for the Western District of North Carolina from 2008 to 2011.

From 2011 to 2013, Farkas attended The University of North Carolina at Chapel Hill, where he earned a Master of Public Administration from the UNC School of Government. From 2012 to 2013, Farkas specialized in emergency management at the National Institute of Environmental Health Sciences, located in the Research Triangle Park.

In January 2014, Farkas joined a Greenville-based architecture firm as Director of Development and Client Relations. While working in the private sector, Farkas continued to volunteer with a number of local and state boards and commissions. From 2014 to 2017, Farkas served on the City of Greenville, North Carolina Public Transportation and Parking Commission, the last two years as Vice Chair. He is a two-term President of the Greenville Museum of Art, serving from July 2016 through June 2017 and again from July 2019 through June 2020. In 2019, Governor Roy Cooper appointed Farkas to serve on the Disciplinary Hearing Commission of the North Carolina State Bar as a public member.

== North Carolina General Assembly ==
In September 2015 Farkas announced his candidacy for the 9th District in the North Carolina House of Representatives. In the March 2016 Primary Election, he defeated Pitt County School Board member Walter Gaskins with over 60% of the vote. In the 2016 General Election, Farkas faced Republican incumbent Greg Murphy, who had been appointed to serve following the resignation of Brian Brown. Murphy defeated Farkas to retain the seat for a full term.

In November 2019, Farkas announced his candidacy to serve Pitt County's 9th District in the North Carolina House of Representatives. House District 9 represents a significant portion of Pitt County, including Greenville, Grimesland, Pactolus, and Simpson. In the March 2020 Primary Election, he defeated Jacob Hochard with over 62% of the vote. In the 2020 General Election on November 3, Farkas faced Republican incumbent Perrin Jones, who had been appointed to serve following the resignation of Greg Murphy. On November 3, 2020, Farkas defeated Jones to become the new Representative for North Carolina House District 9. As a result of Farkas's election, the seat was represented by a Democrat for the first time since Representative Marian McLawhorn in 2012.

=== 2021-2022 Session ===
For the 2021-2022 Legislative session, Farkas was assigned to the following committees: Appropriations, Appropriations-General Government, Commerce, Education-Community Colleges, and Transportation. Following the passage of the 2021-2023 State Budget, Farkas was appointed to the Joint Legislative Committee on Access to Health Care and Medicaid Expansion.

Within the first 30 days of taking office, Farkas sponsored two pieces of legislation to fund the construction of a new building for the Brody School of Medicine at East Carolina University. In November 2021, Farkas voted for the 2021-2023 State Budget, which included fully authorizing $215,000,000 toward the construction of a new facility, and immediately allocating over $75 million for advanced planning, design, and early construction. In total, Farkas’ vote for the budget delivered over $315,000,000 in investment to Pitt County.

After campaigning on fixing broken government in 2020, Farkas was a primary sponsor of House Bill 318, which extended the "cooling off" period required before a former legislator can become a lobbyist, and House Bill 374 to make legislator's documents public records. He also signed on as a primary sponsor of House Bill 542, the Fix Our Democracy Act, which advocated for campaign finance reform, nonpartisan judicial elections, and an independent redistricting commission.

In March 2021, Farkas joined Representatives Adcock, Lambeth, and Gill as a primary sponsor of House Bill 348, which would require at least one nurse in every public school across North Carolina beginning in the 2021–2022 school year.

In April 2021, Farkas filed House Bill 688 to fund the operations of the newly created Pitt County Behavioral Health Treatment Court. He joined with Representatives Harris, Cooper-Suggs, and Lofton as primary sponsors of legislation to re-instate the North Carolina Earned Income Tax. Farkas filed House Bill 772 to examine the state's delivery of long-term care to veterans and determine what improvements can be made to ensure exemplary services moving forward. Working with Representatives Terry Brown and Jon Hardister, Farkas filed House Bill 802, which pilots Support Team Assisted Response (STAR) programs in the cities of Charlotte, Greensboro, and Greenville. Funding for Pitt County's Behavioral Health Treatment Court, the long-term plan for veterans, and the STAR pilot project was included in the 2021-2023 State Budget. In May 2021, Farkas secured over 50% of the House membership as sponsors of the Broadband Empowerment Act (House Bill 816), legislation he filed to give the North Carolina Department of Transportation the authority to construct telecommunications conduit for broadband in the state right-of-way. Farkas’ first piece of legislation to pass the State House as the lead primary sponsor was House Bill 885, which modernized the public notice requirements across the State of North Carolina when a Sanitary Sewer Overflow occurs.

In March 2022, Farkas announced an effort to study and deliver passenger rail service to Pitt County. Full funding for the $250,000 Pitt-Greenville Passenger Rail Feasibility Study was secured in July 2022 through State Planning and Research funds, a critical part of making a future rail project eligible for state and federal funds.

In May 2022, after it was reported that WakeMed and Atrium Health embedded Meta's Metapixel tracker in its patient portals, Farkas authored a joint letter with Representative Donny Lambeth urging State's Attorney General, Josh Stein, to investigate potential privacy violations and make legislative recommendations to improve patient privacy in North Carolina. Following the letter, the Attorney General's Office confirmed that the issue was under investigation.

In June 2022, Farkas voted for the 2022 Appropriations Act, which allocated $3 million toward the creation of the ECU Center for Telemedicine and Digital Healthcare Access. The interdisciplinary Center will focus on enhancing patient care and access to service, educating and training the next generation of providers, and researching clinical outcomes, social determinants of health, models of care delivery, and technology innovation. The legislation also included language from the bipartisan Broadband Modernization Act, which Farkas introduced in May with Representatives Saine and Arp. The legislation aims to increase state broadband speed standards to match federal grants requirements.

On February 25, 2022, Farkas filed to run for re-election to NC House District 9. Following legislative redistricting, which significantly changed the 9th District's configuration and voting demographics, he lost narrowly to Republican Timothy Reeder as Republicans expanded their majority in the 2022 North Carolina House of Representatives election.

== Electoral history ==
North Carolina House of Representatives 9th district general election, 2020
Party	Candidate	Votes	%
Democratic	Brian Farkas	19,198	51.16%
Republican	Perrin Jones (incumbent)	18,329	48.84%
Total votes		37,527	100%
Democratic gain from Republican			

North Carolina House of Representatives 9th district general election, 2022
Party	Candidate	Votes	%
Republican	Timothy Reeder	15,212	50.59%
Democratic	Brian Farkas (incumbent)	14,858	49.41%
Total votes		30,070	100%
Republican gain from Democratic			

North Carolina House of Representatives
Preceded by Perrin Jones	Member of the North Carolina House of Representatives from the 9th District; 2021–2023	Succeeded by Timothy Reeder
