= No More Presidential Wars Act =

Proposed U.S. House of Representatives bill

Legislative history
- Introduced in the House of Representatives as H.Res. 1069 by Tulsi Gabbard (D–HI-2) on September 13, 2018; Committee consideration by House Committee on Foreign Affairs

The No More Presidential Wars Act is bill that was co-sponsored in the House of Representatives on September 13, 2018, by Tulsi Gabbard (D-HI) and the late congressman Walter Jones (R-NC) as an effort to “reclaim the responsibility Congress has [and] to be the body that declares war, to end these presidential wars that are being fought without the authorization of Congress.”

== Description ==
Per the proposed bill's summary, it:

Expresses the sense of the House of Representatives that the President is required to:
(1) Seek congressional authorization prior to any engagement of the U.S. Armed Forces against Syria, Iran, or Russia; and
(2) Consult with Congress before introducing the U.S. Armed Forces into situations of hostilities.

Expresses the sense of the House that the use of the U.S. Armed Forces without congressional authorization is illegal and unconstitutional.

Gabbard added that they co-sponsored this bill to “reclaim the responsibility Congress has [and] to be the body that declares war, to end these presidential wars that are being fought without the authorization of Congress."

The Progressive Democrats of America supported the bill and recalled the War Powers Act to that effect. Barry Ladendorf, a director of the Veterans For Peace, and Bruce Fein, associate deputy attorney general under President Reagan, also expressed their support.

The bill was referred to the House Committee on Foreign Affairs.
