= Timothy Reeder =

American politician

Tim Reeder
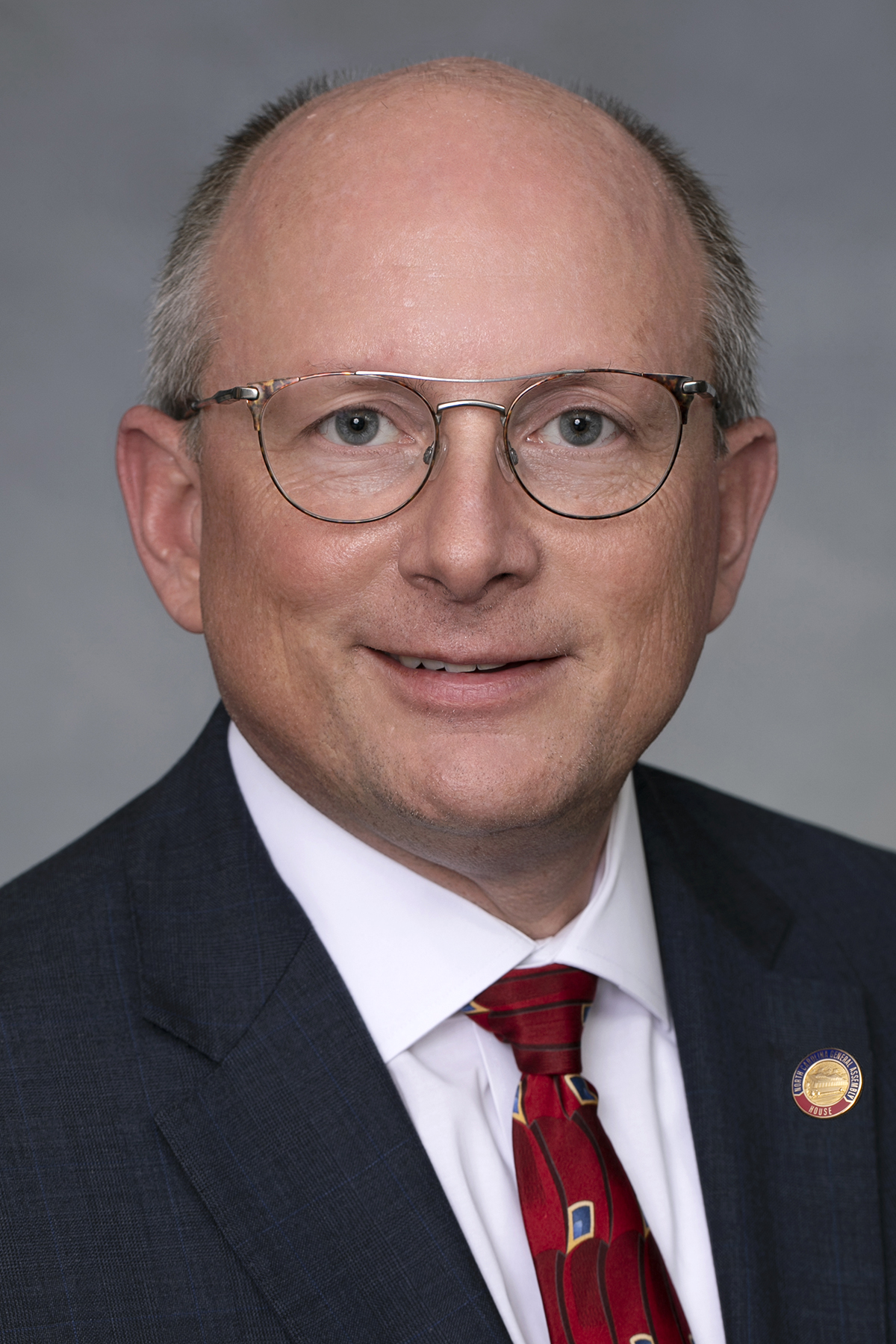

Member of the North Carolina House of Representatives from the 9th district
- Incumbent
- Assumed office January 1, 2023
- Preceded by: Brian Farkas
- Succeeded by: Claire Kempner (elect)

Personal details
- Born: Timothy John Reeder; 1969 (age 56–57) Columbus, Ohio, U.S.
- Party: Republican
- Education: Ohio State University (BA, MD); University of North Carolina at Chapel Hill (MPH)
- Website: www.drtimreeder.com

Timothy John Reeder (born 1969) is an American physician and politician who is the representative of the 9th House district in the North Carolina House of Representatives.

== Early life and education ==
Reeder was born in Columbus, Ohio, and attended Catholic school. He later attended Ohio State University for both his undergraduate and medical degrees. He moved to North Carolina in 1998 where he earned a Master's Degree in Public Health from the University of North Carolina at Chapel Hill, and served as President of the North Carolina Medical Society in 2019. He has worked at the Brody School of Medicine at East Carolina University and as Chief of Medical Staff at Vidant Medical Center.

Reeder is a resident of Ayden, North Carolina.

== North Carolina General Assembly ==
Reeder announced his candidacy for the 9th district, located in Pitt County on December 20, 2021. He won the Republican primary on May 17, 2022, defeating his opponent, Tony P. Moore, by a margin of 908 votes. Reeder campaigned on opposing abortion and critical race theory while supporting lowering taxes. He criticized Governor Roy Cooper and incumbent Brian Farkas for inflation. He stated that he supported Medicaid expansion and accepted the results of the 2020 United States Presidential Election.

On November 8, 2022, Reeder defeated Brian Farkas in a narrow election. On November 3, 2026, he lost to Democrat Claire Kempner by less than 1%.

== Political positions ==
In 2023, Reeder presented Senate Bill 631, which aimed to limit access to transgender health care by minors. The bill faced opposition from transgender rights advocates, and ultimately did not pass. Also in 2023, he proposed a bill that would require all hospitals with emergency departments to have law enforcement officers on site at all times to dissuade violence against health workers.

In March 2025, he filed a bill proposing that doctors in North Carolina have less oversight from insurance companies. The bill proposed that health insurance providers consult with a physician before denying treatment and set timeframes for insurance reviews to prevent delays of emergency treatment. In September of that year, he introduced a bill that would bar the sale of THC products to people under the age of 21. Reeder believes that abortion should be legally limited to the first twelve weeks of pregnancy in most cases.

== Electoral history ==
North Carolina House of Representatives 9th district Republican primary election, 2022
Party	Candidate	Votes	%
Republican	Timothy Reeder	3,318	57.93%
Republican	Tony Moore	2,410	42.07%
Total votes		5,728	100%

North Carolina House of Representatives 9th district general election, 2022
Party	Candidate	Votes	%
Republican	Timothy Reeder	15,212	50.59%
Democratic	Brian Farkas (incumbent)	14,858	49.41%
Total votes		30,070	100%
Republican gain from Democratic			

North Carolina House of Representatives
Preceded by Brian Farkas	Member of the North Carolina House of Representatives from the 9th District; 2023–present	Incumbent
