= Henry Aldridge =

American politician from North Carolina

Member of the North Carolina House of Representatives from the 9th district
- In office January 1, 1995 – January 1, 1999
- Preceded by: Charles McLawhorn
- Succeeded by: Marian McLawhorn

Personal details
- Born: Marvin Warren Aldridge; April 27, 1923 Craven County, North Carolina, U.S.
- Died: February 2, 2002 (aged 78) Greenville, North Carolina, U.S.
- Resting place: Pinewood Memorial Park
- Party: Republican
- Spouse: Susu Tuttle Aldridge
- Children: 8
- Education: East Carolina University; Medical College of Virginia School of Dentistry (1950)
- Profession: Dentist, politician

Marvin Warren "Henry" Aldridge (April 27, 1923 – February 2, 2002) was a dentist and member of the North Carolina House of Representatives.

A native of Craven County, North Carolina, he moved to Greenville in the 1940s, and obtained his undergraduate degree from East Carolina University (ECU). He received his dental degree from the Medical College of Virginia School of Dentistry in 1950. Aldridge practiced as a dentist in Greenville, North Carolina for 50 years.

Aldridge served on the Greenville City Council for a number of terms, and was elected to the North Carolina House (Ninth District) in 1994, defeating Democratic incumbent Charles McLawhorn. He achieved notoriety in 1995 when he asserted that rape victims could not get pregnant. In the context of a debate regarding whether the state should stop funding abortions for poor women, he stated, "The facts show that people who are raped, who are truly raped, the juices don't flow, the body functions don't work, and they don't get pregnant." He later stated that his comments were "stupid." Aldridge's 1995 comments were revisited in August 2012, in light of controversy surrounding U.S. Senate candidate Todd Akin's similar comments.

He was re-elected to his seat in 1996. In 1998, Aldridge also received some press attention when, noting a report that non-white infant mortality rates were nearly twice as high as for white infants, commented that he doubted the report "because it seems that most of the black people I know are bigger and tougher and stronger than whites." Aldridge said afterwards that his comments were intended to be complimentary, as "Black men are generally bigger, strong, better athletes. I would suggest that you take a look at the professional baseball, basketball, and football teams."

Aldridge retired from office in 1998, after losing to Democratic candidate Marian N. McLawhorn in the 1998 election. He died at age 78 on February 2, 2002.

Aldridge was also very active in community organizations, serving as president of the Pitt-Greenville Chamber of Commerce, Greenville Lion's Club, Greenville Boy's Club, and Greenville Little League. He also served as president of the ECU Alumni Association.

North Carolina House of Representatives
Preceded by Charles McLawhorn	Member of the North Carolina House of Representatives from the 9th district 1995-1999	Succeeded by Marian McLawhorn
