= Corolla Wild Horses Protection Act =

2013 bill for the management feral horses

- Long title: To direct the Secretary of the Interior to enter into an agreement to provide for management of the free-roaming wild horses in and around the Currituck National Wildlife Refuge.
- Announced in: the 113th United States Congress
- Sponsored by: Rep. Walter B. Jones (R, NC-3)
- Number of co-sponsors: 0

Codification
- Agencies affected: United States Department of the Interior, National Park Service

Legislative history
- Introduced in the House as H.R. 126 by Rep. Walter B. Jones, Jr. (R-NC) on January 3, 2013; Committee consideration by United States House Committee on Natural Resources, United States House Natural Resources Subcommittee on Fisheries, Wildlife, Oceans and Insular Affairs; Passed the House on June 3, 2013 (Voice vote)

The Corolla Wild Horses Protection Act (H.R. 126) is a bill that was introduced into the 113th United States Congress, where it passed the United States House of Representatives. The bill would affect wild horses living in North Carolina.

== Background ==
The Banker horse is a breed of feral horse (Equus ferus caballus) living on the islands of North Carolina's Outer Banks. It is small, hardy, and has a docile temperament. Descended from domesticated Spanish horses and possibly brought to the Americas in the 16th century, the ancestral foundation bloodstock may have become feral after surviving shipwrecks or being abandoned on the islands by one of the exploratory expeditions led by Lucas Vázquez de Ayllón or Sir Richard Grenville. Populations are found on Ocracoke Island, Shackleford Banks, Currituck Banks, and in the Rachel Carson Estuarine Sanctuary.

About 400 Bankers inhabit the long, narrow barrier islands of North Carolina's Outer Banks. These islands are offshore sediment deposits separated from the mainland by a body of water such as an estuary or sound. The islands can be up to 30 miles (48 km) from the shore; most are less than one mile (1.6 km) wide. Vegetation is sparse and consists mainly of coarse grasses and a few stunted trees. Each island in the chain is separated from the next by a tidal inlet.

As a consequence of Corolla's development in the 1980s, horses on Currituck Banks came into contact with humans more frequently. By 1989, eleven Bankers had been killed by cars on the newly constructed Highway 12. That same year, the Corolla Wild Horse Fund, a nonprofit organization, was created to protect the horses from human interference. As a result of its efforts, the remainder of the herd was moved to a more remote part of the island, where they were fenced into 1,800 acres (7.28 km^{2}; 2.81 sq mi) of combined federal and privately donated land. Corolla commissioners declared the site a feral horse sanctuary. The population is now managed by adopting out yearlings, both fillies and gelded colts. Conflicts over the preservation of the wild horses continued into 2012. In 2013, legislation was introduced to help preserve the herd on Carrituck.

== Provisions/Elements of the bill ==
This summary is based largely on the summary provided by the Congressional Research Service, a public domain source.

The Corolla Wild Horses Protection Act would direct the United States Secretary of the Interior to enter into an agreement with the Corolla Wild Horse Fund, Currituck County, and the state of North Carolina to provide for the management of free-roaming wild horses in and around the Currituck National Wildlife Refuge.

The bill requires that such agreement: (1) allow a herd of no more than 130 free-roaming wild horses in and around the Refuge; (2) provide for cost-effective management of such horses; and (3) provide for the introduction of a small number of free-roaming wild horses from the herd at Cape Lookout National Seashore as is necessary to maintain the genetic viability of the herd in and around the Refuge; and (4) specify that the Corolla Wild Horse Fund shall pay certain costs associated with the health, maintenance, removal, and placement of such horses.

The bill would prohibit the removal of any horse from the Seashore for introduction at the Refuge, except with the approval of the Foundation for Shackleford Horses Inc. and consistent with the memorandum of understanding between the National Park Service and the Foundation and the management plan for the Shackleford Banks Horse Herd.

Finally, the bill would prohibit anything in the bill from being construed as creating liability of the United States for any damages caused by the free-roaming wild horses to any person or property located inside or outside the boundaries of the Refuge.

== Procedural history ==
=== House ===
The Corolla Wild Horses Protection Act was introduced into the United States House of Representatives on January 3, 2013, by Rep. Walter B. Jones, Jr. (R-NC). It was referred to the United States House Committee on Natural Resources and the United States House Natural Resources Subcommittee on Fisheries, Wildlife, Oceans and Insular Affairs. It passed the House on June 3, 2013, through a voice vote.

=== Senate ===
The Corolla Wild Horses Protection Act was received in the United States Senate on June 4, 2013.

== See also ==
- List of bills in the 113th United States Congress

== Notes/References ==
=== Works cited ===
- Blythe, William B.; Egeblad, K. (1983). "The banker ponies of North Carolina and the Ghyben-Herzberg principle". Transactions of the American Clinical and Climatological Association. 94 (6): 63–72. PMC 2279567. PMID 7186237.
- Dohner, Janet Vorwald (2001). "Equines: Banker". Historic and Endangered Livestock and Poultry Breeds. Topeka, Kansas: Yale University Press. pp. 400–401. ISBN 978-0-300-08880-9.
