= Brian Brown (North Carolina politician) =

American politician and businessman

Representative Brian Brown

Member of the North Carolina House of Representatives from the 9th district
- In office January 1, 2013 – October 6, 2015
- Preceded by: Marian McLawhorn
- Succeeded by: Greg Murphy

Personal details
- Born: November 13, 1979 (age 46)
- Party: Republican
- Education: Ohio Northern University

Brian Mathew Brown (born November 13, 1979) is an American politician and businessman.

From Greenville, North Carolina, Brown received his bachelor's degree in history and pre-law from Ohio Northern University in 2002. Brown was a businessman and CEO for Rep Express Limited Liability Corporation. From 2013 until his resignation in November 2015, Brown served in the North Carolina House of Representatives and was a Republican. In November 2015, Brown resigned from the North Carolina General Assembly to work for United States Senator Thom Tillis. Greg Murphy was appointed to succeed Brown.

== Notes ==
North Carolina House of Representatives
Preceded by Marian McLawhorn	Member of the North Carolina House of Representatives from the 9th district 2013-2015	Succeeded by Greg Murphy
