= 2019 North Carolina's 3rd congressional district special election =

- September 10, 2019

North Carolina's 3rd congressional district
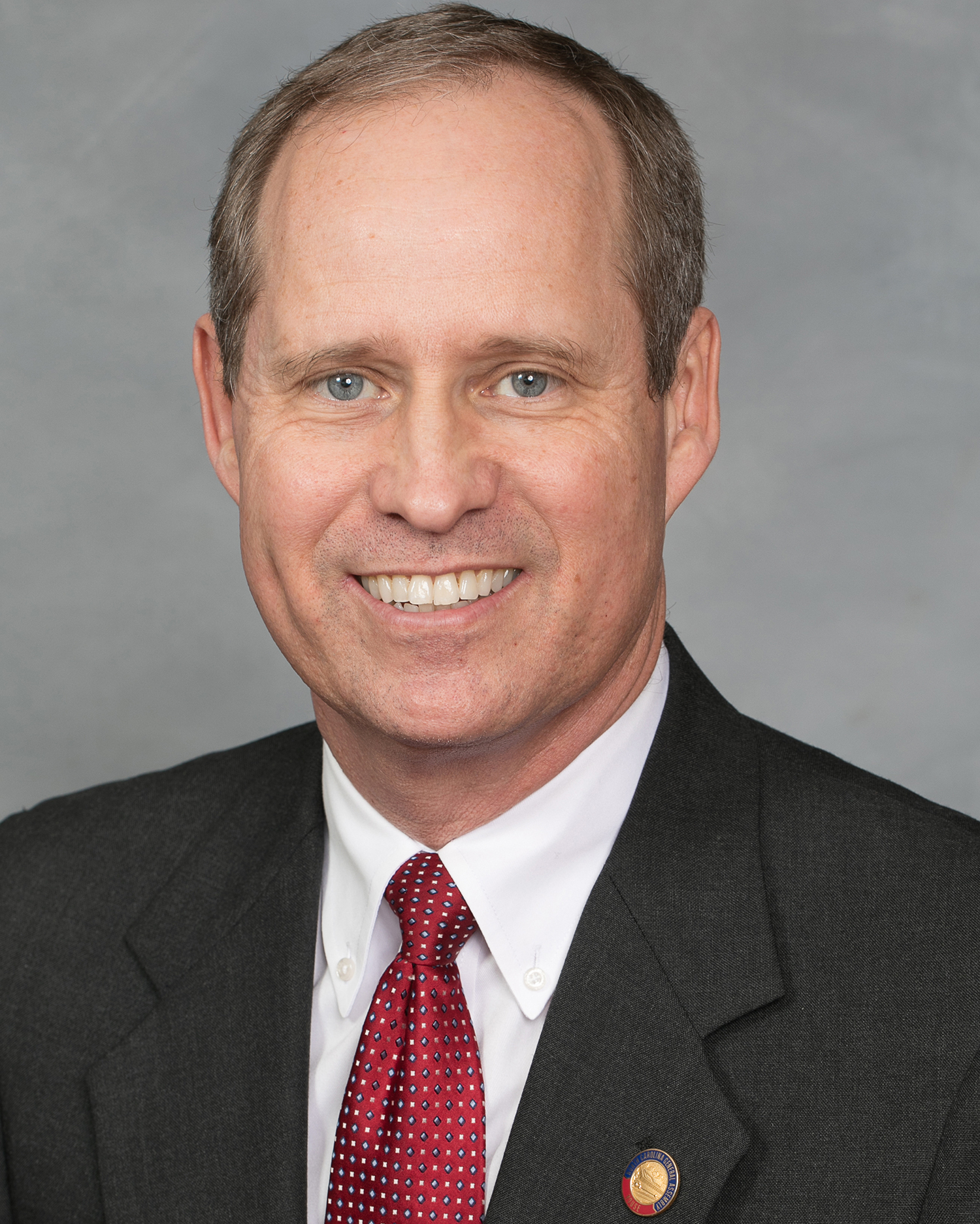

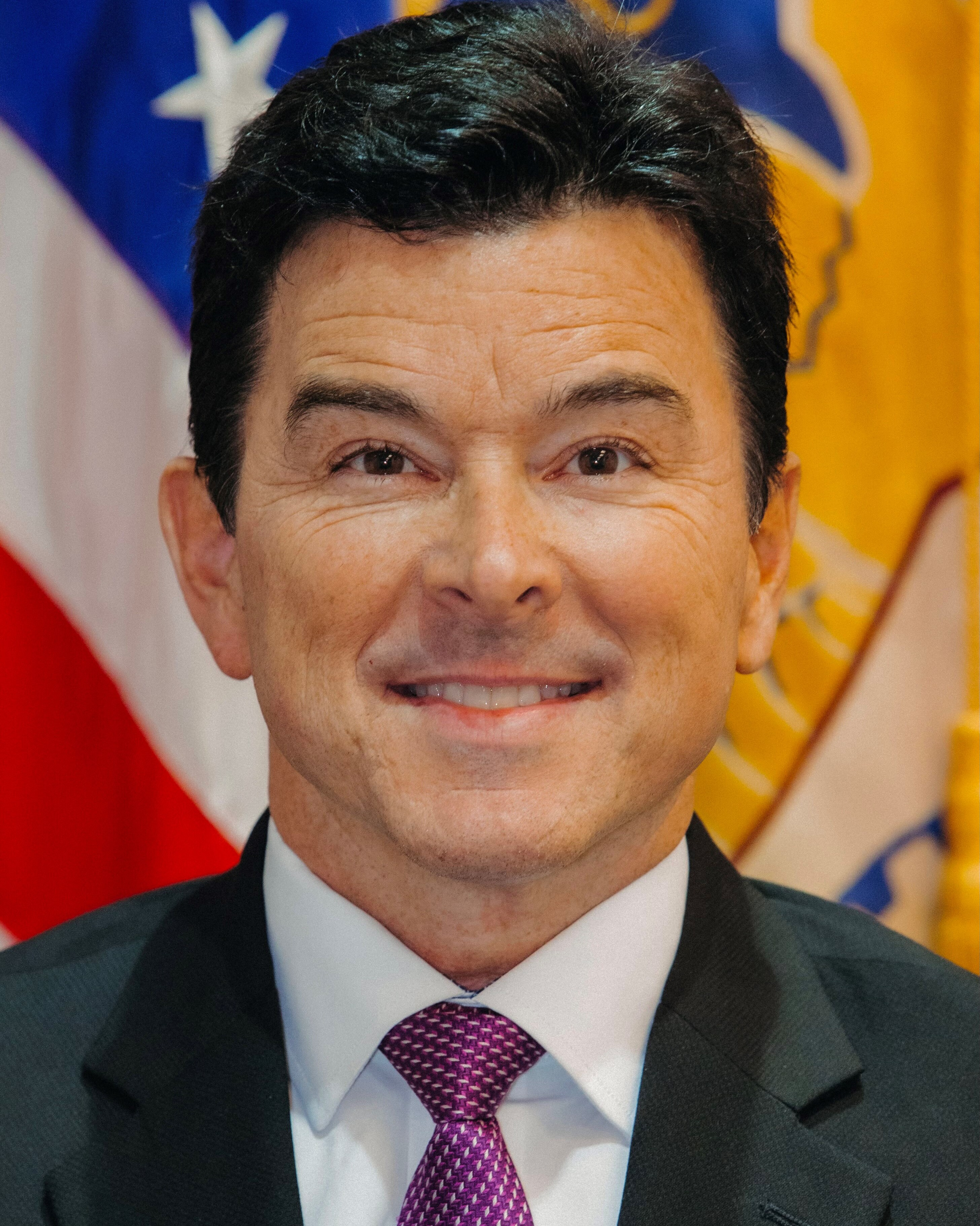
Nominee	Greg Murphy	Allen Thomas
Party	Republican	Democratic
Popular vote	70,407	42,738
Percentage	61.74%	37.47%
- County results Murphy: 50–60% 60–70% 70–80% Thomas: 50–60%
U.S. Representative before election
Vacant
(Walter B. Jones Jr. prior to his death on February 10, 2019)
Republican
Elected U.S. Representative
Greg Murphy
Republican

A special election was held on September 10, 2019, to fill the vacancy in North Carolina's 3rd congressional district in the United States House of Representatives for the remainder of the 116th United States Congress. Walter B. Jones Jr., the incumbent representative, died on February 10, 2019.

Parties held primaries to decide their nominees. In order to win a party nomination outright, under current state law, a candidate must exceed 30% of the vote to avoid a runoff (presuming that the second-place finisher calls for that runoff). There must be 30 days of absentee voting prior to each election, according to state law. Filing began on March 4 and ended March 8, as set by Governor Roy Cooper. Twenty-six candidates filed with the State Board of Elections by the filing deadline: 17 Republicans, 6 Democrats, 2 Libertarians, and 1 Constitution Party candidate. All candidates filed are affiliated with a political party. Five candidates advanced after the first primary elections: two Republicans, one Democrat, one Libertarian, and one Constitution Party candidate.

Cooper set the primary date of April 30, in which the Democrats selected Allen Thomas, Libertarians selected Tim Harris, and in the Constitution Party primary businessman Greg Holt won by default, but no Republican achieved 30% of the vote. Voting for the Republican primary runoff occurred on Tuesday, July 9, between two candidates that are both physicians, Greg Murphy and Joan Perry. Approximately 70 minutes after polls closed, Murphy was declared the winner by the Associated Press.

The general election was held on September 10, 2019. Murphy won the seat.

With the decision by the State Board of Elections to hold a new election to redo the 2018 U.S. House election in North Carolina's 9th district, this became one of two congressional district special elections in North Carolina in 2019, the other being the 9th district's special election held on the same day. This was the first time two U.S. House special elections were held in the same state on the same day (not on Election Day) since the May 3, 2008, elections in Louisiana's 1st district and 6th district.

== Republican primary ==
=== Candidates ===
==== Nominee ====
- Greg Murphy, state representative from the 9th district

==== Eliminated in runoff ====
- Joan Perry, pediatrician

==== Eliminated in primary ====
- Kevin Baiko, doctor
- Paul Beaumont, Currituck County Commissioner
- Graham Boyd, farmer
- Celeste Cairns, accountant
- Gary Ceres, library technician
- Chimer Davis Clark Jr., small businessman
- Don Cox, singer
- Francis De Luca, former president of Civitas Institute
- Phil Law, Marine Corps veteran and candidate for U.S. Representative in 2016 and 2018
- Jeff Moore, small businessman
- Michele Nix, Vice Chair of the North Carolina Republican Party
- Mike Payment, Currituck County Commissioner
- Eric Rouse, Lenoir County Commissioner
- Phil Shepard, state representative from the 15th district
- Michael Speciale, state representative from the 3rd district

==== Declined ====
- Harry Brown, state senator from the 6th district and incumbent North Carolina Senate Majority Leader
- George G. Cleveland, state representative from the 14th district
- Scott Dacey, former vice-chairman of the Craven County Board of Commissioners and candidate for U.S. Representative in 2018
- Pete Gilbert, Pasquotank County Republican Party Chairman
- Ed Goodwin, state representative from the 1st district
- Taylor Griffin, former aide to Jesse Helms and candidate for U.S. Representative in 2014 and 2016
- Bobby Hanig, state representative from the 6th district
- Chris Humphrey, state representative from the 12th district
- Keith Kidwell, state representative from the 79th district
- Pat McElraft, state representative from the 13th district
- Joe McLaughlin, former Onslow County Commissioner, candidate for U.S. Representative in 2008, candidate for North Carolina Commissioner of Insurance in 2016, and candidate for state representative in 2018
- Carl Mischka, chairman of the 3rd congressional district Republican Party Executive Committee
- Frank Palombo, candidate for U.S. Representative in 2012
- Norman W. Sanderson, state senator from the 2nd district
- Sandy Smith, small businesswoman
- Bob Steinburg, state senator from the 1st district
- Paul Wright, Soil and Water Conservation District Supervisor Area 5 Dare County
- Ashley Woolard, 2010 Repubulican nominee for US Congress (NC-01)2010 United States House of Representatives elections in North Carolina, 2012 US presidential elector NC Third Congressional District List of 2012 United States presidential electors, former chairman Beaufort County Republican Party

=== Endorsements ===
Jeff Moore

Politicians

- Rand Paul, U.S. senator from Kentucky
Greg Murphy

Organizations

- Women for Trump

Politicians

- Rudy Giuliani, former mayor of New York City
- Rick Santorum, former U.S. senator
- Mark Meadows, U.S. representative
- Jim Jordan, U.S. representative
Joan Perry

Organizations

- Susan B. Anthony List
- Winning for Women
- FreedomWorks
- Maggie's List

Politicians

- Liz Cheney, U.S. representative
- George Holding, U.S. representative
- Paul Stam, former state representative from the 37th district
- Elise Stefanik, U.S. representative

=== First round ===
==== Polling ====
Poll source	Date(s) administered	Sample size	Margin of error	Celeste Cairns	Phil Law	Jeff Moore	Greg Murphy	Joan Perry	Eric Rouse	Phil Shepard	Michael Speciale	Other	Undecided
Atlantic Media & Research (R) (Note: Open-ended poll sponsored a "private client", likely Conservatives for a Better North Carolina, a super PAC supporting Phil Shepard)	April 24–27, 2019	253	± 6.1%	2%	3%	6%	14%	9%	4%	7%	6%	5% (Note: Paul Beaumont, Chimer Clark, Don Cox, and Francis De Luca with 1%; Kevin Baiko, Gary Ceres, Michele Nix, and Mike Payment with 0%)	44%

==== Results ====
Results by county: Murphy: 10–20%; 30–40%; 60–70%; Perry: 10–20%; 30–40%; 50–60%; Shepard: 50–60%; Speciale: 10–20%; 20–30%; 40–50%; Rouse: 10–20%; 20–30%; Beaumont: 10–20%; Payment: 20–30%

Republican primary results
Party	Candidate	Votes	%
Republican	Greg Murphy	9,530	22.51
Republican	Joan Perry	6,536	15.44
Republican	Phil Shepard	5,101	12.05
Republican	Michael Speciale	4,022	9.50
Republican	Phil Law	3,690	8.72
Republican	Eric Rouse	3,258	7.70
Republican	Jeff Moore	2,280	5.39
Republican	Francis De Luca	1,670	3.95
Republican	Celeste Cairns	1,467	3.47
Republican	Chimer Davis Clark Jr.	1,092	2.58
Republican	Michele Nix	915	2.16
Republican	Graham Boyd	897	2.12
Republican	Paul Beaumont	805	1.90
Republican	Mike Payment	537	1.27
Republican	Don Cox	251	0.59
Republican	Kevin Baiko	171	0.40
Republican	Gary Ceres	108	0.26
Total votes		42,330	100.0

=== Runoff ===
==== Results ====
Results by county: Murphy: 50–60%; 60–70%; 70–80%; 80–90%; Perry: 50–60%; 70–80%

Republican primary runoff results
Party	Candidate	Votes	%
Republican	Greg Murphy	21,444	59.7
Republican	Joan Perry	14,472	40.3
Total votes		35,916	100.0

== Democratic primary ==
=== Candidates ===
==== Nominee ====
- Allen Thomas, former mayor of Greenville and executive director of Global TransPark

==== Eliminated ====
- Richard Bew, former U.S. Marine Corps colonel
- Gregory Humphrey, former journalist
- Ike Johnson, Democratic nominee for State House district 14 in 2018
- Dana Outlaw, mayor of New Bern
- Ernest T. Reeves, Democratic nominee for North Carolina's 3rd congressional district in 2016

==== Declined ====
- Ollie Nelson, retired U.S. Marine, educator, and pastor
- George Parrott, businessman
- Scott Thomas, District Attorney for North Carolina's 4th prosecutorial district

=== Endorsements ===
Richard Bew

Politicians

- Seth Moulton, U.S. Representative (D-MA)

Individuals

- Amy McGrath, retired marine fighter pilot and nominee for KY-6 in 2018
- Richard Ojeda, former West Virginia State Senator and nominee for WV-3 in 2018

Organizations

- Equality North Carolina
- Serve America
- VoteVets.org
Allen Thomas

Politicians

- G. K. Butterfield, U.S. Representative (D-NC)

=== Results ===
Results by county: Thomas: 40–50%; 50–60%; 60–70%; 70–80%; Bew: 40–50%; 50–60%; Johnson: 30–40%

Democratic primary results
Party	Candidate	Votes	%
Democratic	Allen Thomas	12,933	49.96
Democratic	Richard Bew	6,532	25.23
Democratic	Dana Outlaw	3,268	12.63
Democratic	Ike Johnson	1,774	6.85
Democratic	Gregory Humphrey	695	2.68
Democratic	Ernest T. Reeves	683	2.64
Total votes		25,885	100.0

== Libertarian primary ==
=== Candidates ===
==== Declared ====
- Shannon Bray, U.S. Navy veteran, author, cybersecurity expert
- Tim Harris, U.S. Marine Corps veteran, IT engineer, candidate for North Carolina Senate for the 2nd district in 2018

=== Results ===
Libertarian primary results
Party	Candidate	Votes	%
Libertarian	Tim Harris	75	55.97
Libertarian	Shannon Bray	59	44.03
Total votes		134	100.0

== Constitution primary ==
=== Candidates ===
==== Nominee (by default) ====
- Greg Holt, businessman

== General election ==
During the early voting period for this election, Hurricane Dorian battered the eastern coast of the United States, necessitating early voting to be halted in several counties on the Outer Banks until the storm had passed. This also happened in the election for North Carolina's 9th congressional district.

=== Predictions ===
Source	Ranking	As of
The Cook Political Report	Safe R	August 26, 2019
Inside Elections	Safe R	September 4, 2019
Sabato's Crystal Ball	Likely R	September 5, 2019

=== Endorsements ===
Greg Murphy (R)

Federal politicians

- Donald Trump, 45th president of the United States
- Mike Pence, 48th vice president of the United States
- Thom Tillis, U.S. senator (R-NC)
- Mark Meadows, U.S. Representative (R-NC)
- Jim Jordan, U.S. Representative (R-OH)

Individuals

- Donald Trump Jr., businessman
- Kayleigh McEnany, political commentator

Organizations

- Women for Trump
- National Right to Life
- National Federation of Independent Business
Allen Thomas (D)

Federal politicians

- Alma Adams, U.S. representative (D-NC)
- G. K. Butterfield, U.S. representative (D-NC)
- Bob Etheridge, former U.S. representative (D-NC)
- Julian Castro, former U.S. secretary of housing and urban development

Statewide, and local politicians

- Toby Fitch, state senator
- Jim Hunt, former governor of North Carolina
- Erica D. Smith, state senator

Organizations

- AFL–CIO
- Equality North Carolina
- Sierra Club North Carolina Chapter
- National Education Association

=== Polling ===
Poll source	Date(s) administered	Sample size	Margin of error	Greg Murphy (R)	Allen Thomas (D)	Other	Undecided
GAJ Solutions (R) (Note: Poll conducted for RRH)	August 26–28, 2019	500	± 4.0%	51%	40%	3% (Note: Harris (L) with 2% and Holt (C) with 1%)	6%

Hypothetical polling

with generic Republican and generic Democrat

Poll source	Date(s) administered	Sample size	Margin of error	Generic Republican	Generic Democrat	Undecided
Strategic Partners Solutions	May 18–19, 2019	400	± 4.9%	49%	41%	–

=== Fundraising ===
Campaign finance reports as of August 21, 2019
Candidate (party)	Total receipts	Total disbursements	Cash on hand
Greg Murphy (R)	$901,590.47	$803,487.06	$98,103.41
Allen Thomas (D)	$564,575.49	$476,025.52	$88,549.97
Source: Federal Election Commission

=== Results ===
2019 North Carolina's 3rd congressional district special election
Party	Candidate	Votes	%	±%
Republican	Greg Murphy	70,407	61.74	−38.26
Democratic	Allen Thomas	42,738	37.47	N/A
Constitution	Greg Holt	507	0.44	N/A
Libertarian	Tim Harris	394	0.35	N/A
Total votes		'114,046'	'100'	N/A
Republican hold				

Despite the clear victory, 61.7% is the lowest Republican vote share in this district since 2012.

== See also ==
- List of special elections to the United States House of Representatives

== Notes ==
Partisan clients

Additional candidates
