= Walter B. Jones Jr. =

American politician (1943–2019)

Walter Jones
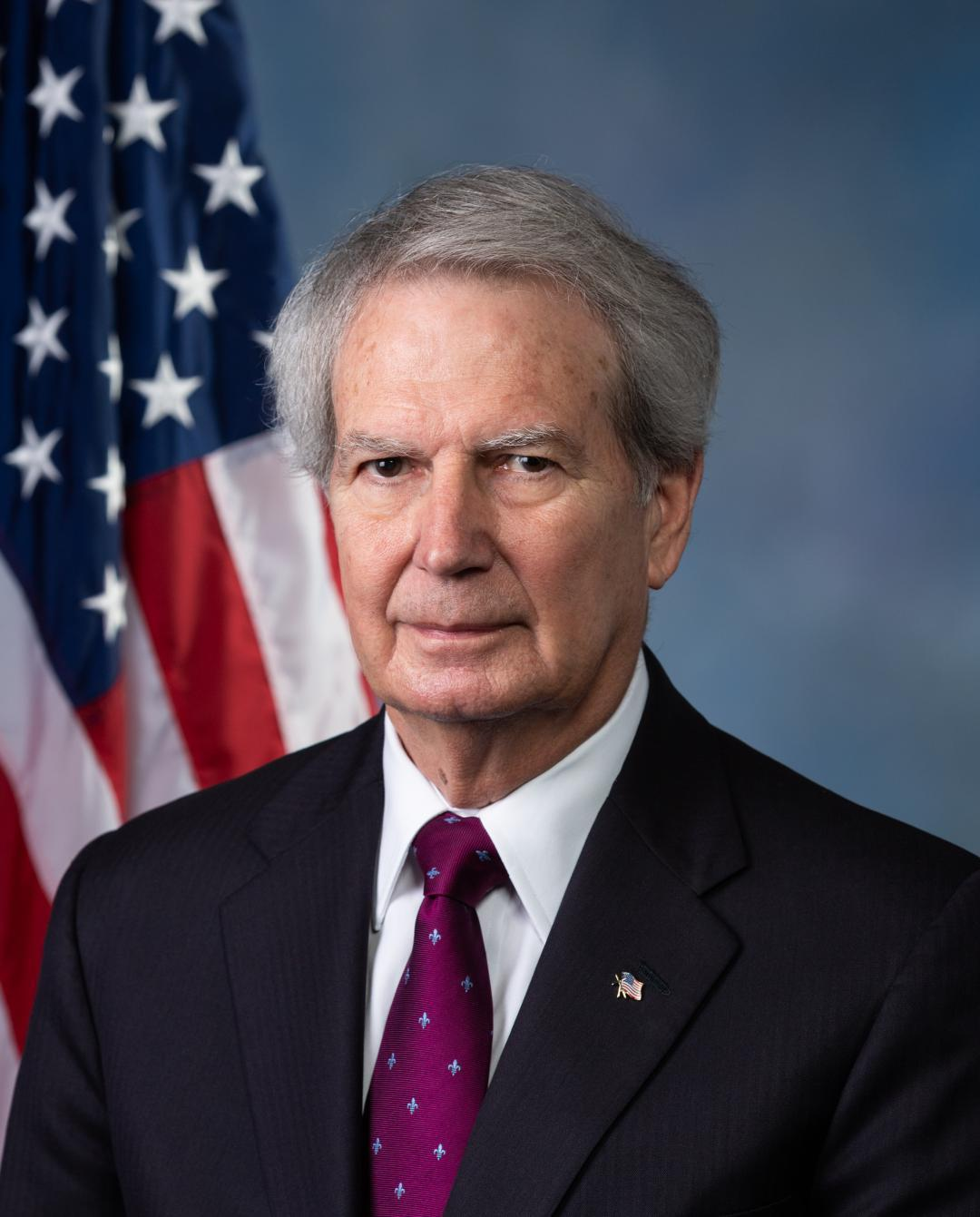

Member of the U.S. House of Representatives from North Carolina's 3rd district
- In office January 3, 1995 – February 10, 2019
- Preceded by: Martin Lancaster
- Succeeded by: Greg Murphy

Member of the North Carolina House of Representatives from the 9th district
- In office January 31, 1983 – January 1, 1993
- Preceded by: Sam Bundy
- Succeeded by: Seat Abolished

Personal details
- Born: Walter Beaman Jones Jr. February 10, 1943 Farmville, North Carolina, U.S.
- Died: February 10, 2019 (aged 76) Greenville, North Carolina, U.S.
- Party: Republican (after 1994)
- Other political affiliations: Democratic (before 1994)
- Spouse: Joe Anne Whitehurst (m. 1966)
- Children: 1
- Relatives: Walter B. Jones Sr. (Father)
- Education: Barton College (BA)

Military service
- Branch/service: United States Army
- Years of service: 1967–1971
- Unit: North Carolina National Guard
- Walter B. Jones Jr.'s voice Jones explains H.R.4808, the Unfair Chinese Automotive Tariff Equalization Act; Recorded March 28, 2006

Walter Beaman Jones Jr. (February 10, 1943 – February 10, 2019) was an American politician who served twelve terms in the United States House of Representatives as a member of the Republican Party for North Carolina's 3rd congressional district from 1995 until his death in 2019. The district encompassed the coastal regions of North Carolina, from the Outer Banks and areas near the Pamlico Sound in the north, southwards to the northern suburbs of Wilmington. Jones's father was Walter B. Jones Sr., a Democratic Party congressman from the neighboring 1st district. Prior to his election to the U.S. House of Representatives, he served ten years in the North Carolina House of Representatives as a member of the Democratic Party and worked as a business executive.

He had been a Democrat like his father before changing parties in 1994, just before his first election to the U.S. House. Even after becoming a Republican, he frequently broke with the party over key issues. He supported the U.S. involvement in the Iraq War initially, but became one of its staunchest critics, arguing that the George W. Bush administration misinformed Congress with selective intelligence to win authorization for the war. He also was a critic of the Bush administration in their firing of federal prosecutors, and joined Democrats in supporting raises to the federal minimum wage. During the Obama administration, he voted against the Republican Path to Prosperity budget proposal of 2011, after which he was removed from key committee roles for defying party leadership. During the first Trump presidency, he was a frequent voice on the floor of Congress calling for scrutiny of the Trump presidency, including demanding the release of his tax returns and calling for investigations into alleged Trump presidential campaign involvement in the Russian interference in the 2016 United States elections.

Having libertarian-leaning tendencies, he was a member of the Liberty Caucus.

== Early life, education, and business career ==
Jones was the son of U.S. representative Walter B. Jones Sr. (1913–1992) and Doris (Long) Jones (1914–1984).

Jones was a lifelong resident of Farmville, a small town near Greenville, North Carolina. He attended Hargrave Military Academy in Chatham, Virginia and graduated in 1966 with a Bachelor of Arts from Atlantic Christian College (now Barton College) in Wilson, North Carolina, before serving four years (1967–1971) in the North Carolina National Guard. He worked as an executive with his family's business supply company.

== North Carolina legislature ==
Jones was first elected as a Democrat to the North Carolina House of Representatives in 1982 and served for five terms, until 1992. He represented Pitt County. He was known in the North Carolina House for his advocacy of campaign finance reform and lobbying reform.

== U.S. House of Representatives ==
=== Elections ===
1992

After his father announced his retirement from Congress in 1992, Jones ran for his father's seat in North Carolina's 1st congressional district. He ranked first in the Democratic primary with 38% of the vote, but failed to reach the 40% threshold to win the nomination. In the run-off election, he was defeated by Eva Clayton, Chairwoman of the Warren County Board of Commissioners, by a margin of 55–45%. Clayton received support from three of the defeated primary candidates and from the African American community. Jones Sr. died before his term expired, and Clayton was elected to serve out the last two months of his term.

1994

In 1994, he switched parties and ran in North Carolina's 3rd congressional district, which had absorbed a large chunk of his father's former territory. His race against incumbent Democrat Martin Lancaster was initially very close until Jones released a picture of Lancaster jogging with President Bill Clinton, whose socially liberal stances (especially on gays in the military) angered many voters in the district. Although Democrats had a large advantage in registered voters, the 3rd district had a very strong social conservative tint. Jesse Helms in particular had a large base of support there. As part of the 1994 Republican takeover of Congress, Jones defeated Lancaster 53–47%. With his victory, Jones became the first Republican to represent a significant portion of Eastern North Carolina in the House since Reconstruction.

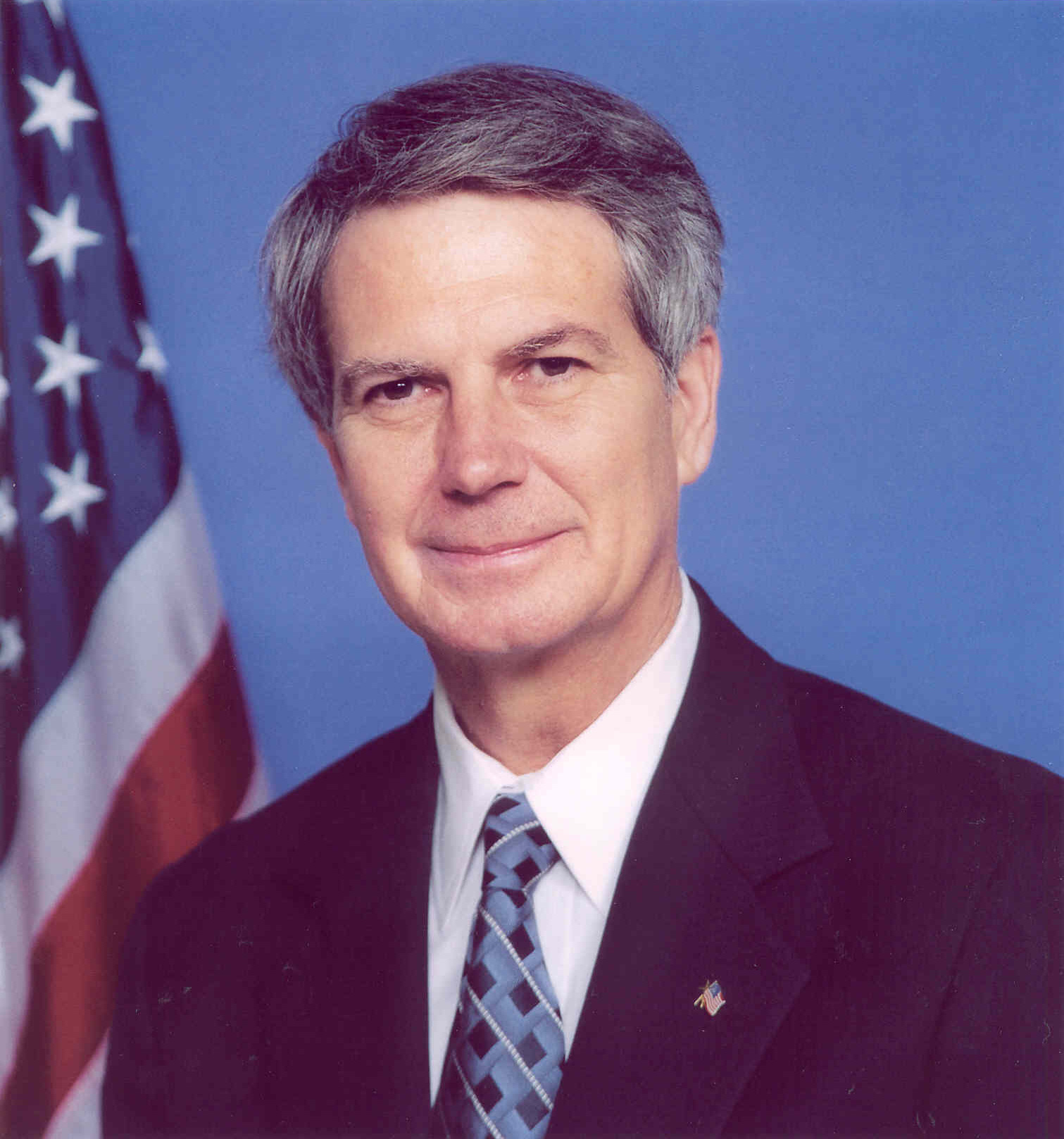
Early portrait of Jones as a Congressman

1996–2004

From 1994 on Jones won re-election with at least 61% in every general election. His most serious general election challenge came in 2000, when his opponent spent well in excess of $1.4 million in attempting to unseat him. Jones garnered 61% of the vote in that contest, largely helped by George W. Bush, winning the 3rd with his highest victory margin in the state.

2006

He was easily re-elected to a 7th term in 2006, receiving 69% of the vote despite a very bad national result for Republicans overall.

2008

Jones' change of heart on the Iraq War (see below) resulted in him facing serious primary opposition for the first time since his initial run for Congress. He was challenged by Onslow County Commissioner Joe McLaughlin. Jones defeated the poorly funded McLaughlin 59–41%. In the general election, Jones defeated Craig Weber 66–34%.

2010

In the general election, he defeated Johnny Rouse with 73% of the vote.

2012

He faced Frank Palombo, a former New Bern police chief in the Republican primary on May 8 and won. He won against Marine Corps Veteran Erik Anderson in the general election.

2014

He faced Taylor Griffin, a former aide to President George W. Bush, who was heavily supported by outside money, and won the Republican Party primary on May 6.

2016

He defeated Democrat Ernest Reeves by 67–32%.

2018

Jones was re-elected to his final term in November 2018 unopposed.

=== Tenure ===
Secretary of Defense Chuck Hagel, left, meets with Jones on July 10, 2013, at the Pentagon in Arlington, Virginia

Jones had a lifetime rating of 84.69 from the American Conservative Union. However, his voting record had become somewhat more moderate in the years prior to his death, according to the group's ranking. In recent years, he had received some of the lowest ACU ratings of any Republican from the South. In 2006, he received a 79, in 2007 he received a 71, in 2008 he received a 58, in 2009 he received an 83, in 2010 he received a 65, and in 2011 he received a 60. The former five ratings were the lowest recorded in those years for a Republican from North Carolina.

Jones was ranked as the 37th most bipartisan member of the U.S. House of Representatives during the 114th United States Congress (and the most bipartisan member of the U.S. House of Representatives from North Carolina) in the Bipartisan Index created by The Lugar Center and the McCourt School of Public Policy that ranks members of the United States Congress by their degree of bipartisanship (by measuring the frequency each member's bills attract co-sponsors from the opposite party and each member's co-sponsorship of bills by members of the opposite party).

Jones said that his father was able to vote his conscience until he became a member of the House Democratic leadership, at which time he had to vote with the party line. For instance, his father voted for the 1975 federal bailout of a bankrupt New York City even though he personally opposed it. Jones said of that vote, "He had to vote it that way. I would rather do what I think is right than to sell my political soul." Jones drifted towards the libertarian spectrum when he changed his positions on foreign policy including the Iraq War.

Jones opposed pork barrel spending projects and was a staunch advocate of federal prohibition of online poker. In 2006, he cosponsored H.R. 4777, the Internet Gambling Prohibition Act and voted for H.R. 4411, the Goodlatte-Leach Internet Gambling Prohibition Act.

Jones sided with the Democrats on economic issues such as raising the minimum wage. He was an animal lover and said he would like a memorial created on the National Mall for war dogs. Jones endorsed Ron Paul in the 2008 race for president of the United States. In an annual survey conducted by Washingtonian magazine, congressional staffers voted Jones the kindest member of the House.

In 2007, Jones cosponsored legislation with fellow North Carolina congressman Heath Shuler to require airlines to have sections of the aircraft where large movie screens were not visible. This was to avoid the situation where children could potentially watch films found objectionable by their parents. He also was the only Republican co-sponsor of legislation to challenge Tom DeLay's proposed changes to House ethics rules.

On February 14, 2008, Jones was one of only three Republicans (along with Ron Paul and Wayne Gilchrest) to vote to hold George W. Bush confidantes Joshua Bolten and Harriet Miers in contempt of Congress for failing to testify and provide documents relevant to the firing of federal prosecutors. On September 15, 2009, Jones was one of only seven Republicans to vote for a resolution of disapproval of fellow Representative Joe Wilson for his actions during President Obama's address to a Joint Session of Congress on September 9, 2009.

Jones presented the Walter B. Jones Campus Defender of Freedom Award to a North Carolina activist selected by a committee at Duke University, including the Duke College Republicans; in 2009, Jones presented the award to B.J. Lawson. At the 2009 ceremony, Jones said that "The Republican Party needs to have a face that can be seen and identified with by people of all races. The future of the Republican Party lies in being able to relate to the average working family." He also spoke in favor of making Duke's endowment more transparent, saying that he is in favor of more openness on the part of institutions: "To me, sunshine is the answer."

In 2010, congressional aides on Capitol Hill ranked Jones as the second nicest in the U.S. House of Representatives and the second least partisan member of the House.

On April 15, 2011, Jones was one of four Republican members of Congress to vote against The Path to Prosperity. In December 2012, Jones was one of four House Republicans removed from their committees by Speaker of the House John Boehner and Majority Leader Eric Cantor for defying party leadership. Jones was removed from the Financial Services Committee, a plum seat for fundraising, ostensibly as reprisal for not raising money for the Republican Party. However, it was speculated that Jones, who was popular in the caucus, was only removed to give "cover" for the removals of Justin Amash of Michigan, Tim Huelskamp of Kansas and David Schweikert of Arizona who lost their own plum committee assignments, characterized as a result of them being "assholes". Representative Lynn Westmoreland concluded, "some people ... just don't want to work within the system." Jones maintained his seat on the Armed Services Committee.

He is the author of Corolla Wild Horses Protection Act (H.R. 126;113th Congress).

In February 2017, Jones signed a letter to urge Congress to request President Donald Trump's tax returns so that they can be reviewed in a closed session of Congress and determined whether the returns can be released to the public. During the 115th United States Congress, Jones voted in line with Trump's stated positions 49.3 percent of the time, the lowest rate of any Republican conference member.

On March 28, 2017, Jones became the first Republican Congressman to call for Representative Devin Nunes to recuse himself as chairman of the House Intelligence Committee, and for the establishment of an independent commission to investigate Russian interference in the 2016 presidential election. He cited the alleged impropriety of Congressman Nunes' meeting at the White House the previous week as the reason for breaking with his party on the issue.

==== Foreign wars ====
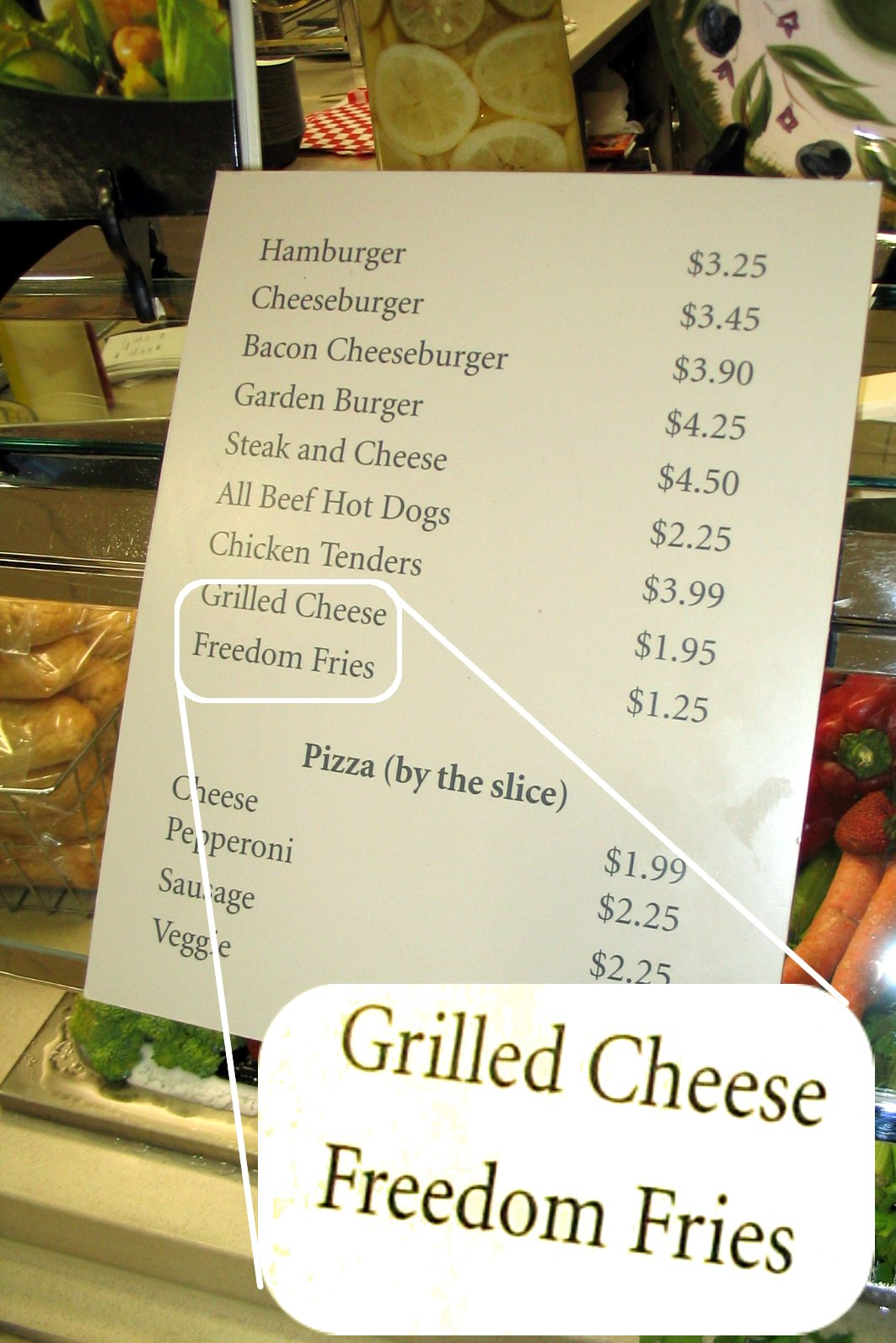
Menu from a Congressional cafeteria featuring freedom fries

Jones was initially a strong supporter of the conflict in Iraq, but then became one of the leading Republicans opposed to continued involvement in Iraq. Jones became well known for leading the effort, along with GOP Rep. Bob Ney, to have French fries renamed "freedom fries" on House cafeteria menus as a protest against French opposition to the 2003 invasion of Iraq. Jones later modified his stance on the war to a considerable extent. In 2005, he stated that he had come to believe that there had been little reason to go to war, despite his earlier support, which had been based upon selective intelligence supplied to Congress. He said of his previous position on the fries, "I wish it had never happened." In July 2006, the names were quietly changed back.

On March 17, 2005, he sponsored a bill endorsing the conduct of his Camp Lejeune constituent, controversial Marine Corps Lieutenant Ilario Pantano, who faced charges (subsequently dropped) for having shot two Iraqis (allegedly unarmed civilians) on April 15, 2004.

Jones called on President George W. Bush to apologize for misinforming Congress to win authorization for the war. Jones said, "If I had known then what I know today, I wouldn't have voted for that resolution."

Jones contended that the United States went to war "with no justification." On the subject, he said, "I just feel that the reason of going in for weapons of mass destruction, the ability of the Iraqis to make a nuclear weapon, that's all been proven that it was never there." He added that his change of opinion came about from attending the funeral of a sergeant killed in Iraq, when his last letter to his family was being read out. On June 16, 2005, he joined with three other members of Congress (Neil Abercrombie, Dennis Kucinich and Ron Paul) in introducing a resolution calling for the start of a withdrawal of U.S. forces from Iraq to begin by October 2006. Jones covered the hallway outside his office with photographs of soldiers who had died in Iraq. He said, "If we were given misinformation intentionally by people in this administration, to commit the authority to send boys, and in some instances girls, to go into Iraq, that is wrong. Congress must be told the truth."

In 2007, he and Rep. William Delahunt (D–MA) introduced the Constitutional War Powers Resolution, which sought to "prohibit the president from ordering military action without congressional approval, except when the United States or U.S. troops were attacked or when U.S. citizens needed to be evacuated."

On January 12, 2007, he introduced H. J. Res. 14: Concerning the use of military force by the United States against Iran in the 110th congress. According to Jones on his web site, the resolution requires that – absent a national emergency created by an attack, or a demonstrably imminent attack, by Iran upon the United States or its armed forces – the President must consult with Congress and receive specific authorization prior to initiating any use of military force against Iran. This resolution was removed from a military spending bill for the war in Iraq by House Speaker Nancy Pelosi (D–CA) on March 13, 2007.

On March 23, 2007, Jones was one of two Republicans to vote for a bill that would have required President George W. Bush to bring combat troops home from Iraq by September 1, 2008. The other Republican was Wayne Gilchrest of Maryland's 1st congressional district.

Jones' views on the war in Iraq did not ingratiate him to Bush or to the Republican leadership, which prevented him from succeeding the late Jo Ann Davis as ranking Republican on the Readiness Subcommittee of the Armed Forces Committee. He was passed over for Randy Forbes when the 110th Congress convened because the full committee's ranking member, Duncan Hunter of California, did not agree with Jones' change of heart on the war. He had been approached by some Democrats about bolting the GOP and either becoming an independent caucusing with the Democrats or switching back to the Democratic Party outright. Additionally, Jones' changed views on the war and other issues angered many Republicans in his district, which has the largest military presence of any in North Carolina.

On March 7, 2012, Jones introduced House Concurrent Resolution 107, proposing that Congress should consider waging wars without an Act of Congress as grounds for impeachment of the President for High Crimes and Misdemeanors according to the Constitution of the United States of America.

In April 2017, Jones criticized U.S. involvement in Saudi Arabian-led intervention in Yemen, highlighting that Al-Qaeda in Yemen "has emerged as a de facto ally of the Saudi-led militaries with whom [Trump] administration aims to partner more closely."

In the wake of the 2016 Orlando nightclub shooting, Jones put out a press release calling it "horrific and senseless." He expressed that he was mourning the loss of Shane Evan Tomlinson, a graduate from East Carolina University.

Jones co-sponsored the No More Presidential Wars Act with Democrat Tulsi Gabbard in 2017.

=== Committee assignments (115th Congress) ===
- Committee on Armed Services
  - Subcommittee on Tactical Air and Land Forces
  - Subcommittee on Military Personnel

=== Caucus memberships ===
Jones served on the Liberty Caucus (sometimes called the Liberty Committee), a group of libertarian-minded Republican congressional representatives. Congressman Ron Paul originally hosted a luncheon for the Liberty Caucus every Thursday. The caucus was subsequently hosted and chaired by Congressman Justin Amash. Other members included Jim Duncan of Tennessee, Roscoe Bartlett of Maryland, and Jeff Flake of Arizona.

Jones was a member of the Congressional NextGen 9-1-1 Caucus and the Veterinary Medicine Caucus.

== Political positions ==
Jones co-sponsored four cannabis bills, including supporting veterans' access to medical cannabis and hemp farming. He voted against the Tax Cuts and Jobs Act of 2017 due to the anticipated $2 trillion that would be added to the national debt. "I'm all for tax reform, but it must grow the economy, not the debt," he stated. He also voted against it due to concerns that his constituents would pay more taxes. "That is the last thing struggling families need," he stated in wake of the vote. Jones agreed with Michael Mullen and James Mattis that the national debt is the "biggest threat" to national security.

== Personal life ==
Jones was raised a Southern Baptist, but was a Roman Catholic convert at the age of 31. He married Joe Anne Whitehurst in 1966, and the two had one child, a daughter, Ashley.

=== Illness and death ===
In July 2018, Jones began to miss votes due to illness; in December of that year, the House granted him a leave of absence for the remainder of the session by unanimous consent. As he was temporarily unable to travel, he was sworn in as a member of the 116th Congress from his home in Farmville. In January 2019, he broke his hip. On January 26, 2019, his wife said that he had been admitted to hospice care.

Jones died on February 10, 2019, in Greenville, North Carolina, on his 76th birthday. After Jones's funeral, it was revealed that he had been diagnosed with amyotrophic lateral sclerosis two months prior to his death. Members of Congress paid tribute to him in a special session on March 5, 2019.

== See also ==
- List of members of the United States Congress who died in office (2000–present)#2010s

North Carolina House of Representatives
Preceded by Sam Bundy	Member of the North Carolina House of Representatives from 9th district 1983–1993; Served alongside: Ed Warren, Charles McLawhorn	Succeeded by Seat Abolished
U.S. House of Representatives
Preceded by Martin Lancaster	Member of the U.S. House of Representatives from North Carolina's 3rd congressional district 1995–2019	Succeeded by Greg Murphy
