= Greg Murphy (politician) =

American politician and urologist (born 1963)

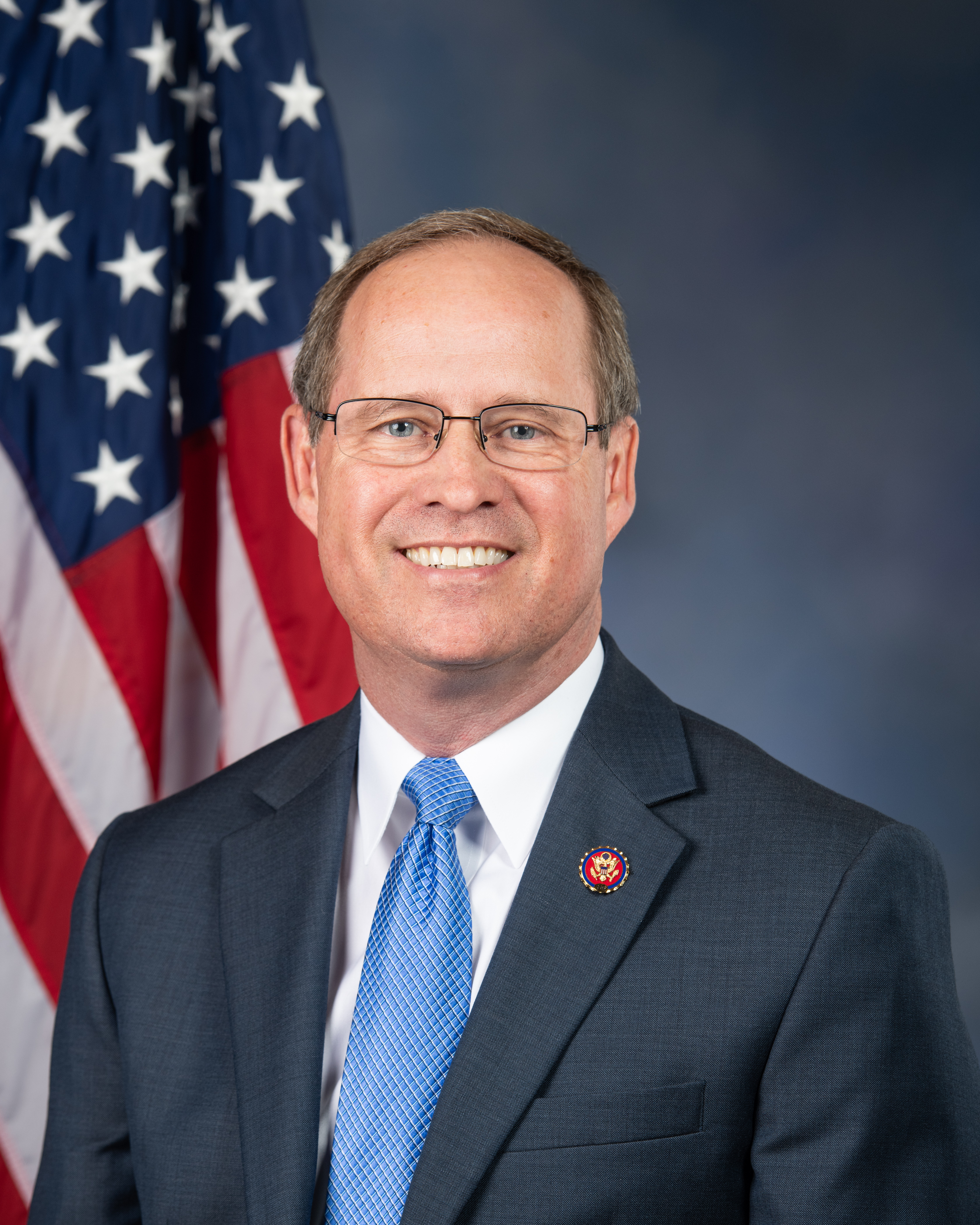
- Official portrait, 2019

Member of the U.S. House of Representatives from North Carolina's 3rd district
- Incumbent
- Assumed office September 17, 2019
- Preceded by: Walter B. Jones Jr.

Member of the North Carolina House of Representatives from the 9th district
- In office October 19, 2015 – September 17, 2019
- Preceded by: Brian Brown
- Succeeded by: Perrin Jones

Personal details
- Born: Gregory Francis Murphy; March 5, 1963 (age 63) Tarrytown, New York, U.S.
- Party: Republican
- Education: Davidson College (BS); University of North Carolina at Chapel Hill (MD)
- Website: House website Campaign website

Gregory Francis Murphy (born March 5, 1963) is an American politician and urologist representing North Carolina's 3rd congressional district in the U.S. House of Representatives since 2019. He lost his reelection in November 2026 amid a wave of Democratic victories and after his district was slightly redrawn to try to benefit Republicans in the 1st congressional district. He served as a representative in the North Carolina General Assembly from 2015 to 2019. Murphy is a member of the Republican Party.

== Early life and education ==
Murphy was born in Tarrytown, New York, and raised in Raleigh, North Carolina, where he attended Needham B. Broughton High School. After high school, he attended Davidson College. He then completed medical school at the University of North Carolina at Chapel Hill.

After completing his residency in urology and renal transplantation at the University of Kentucky, Murphy and his wife settled in Greenville, North Carolina, where he began his medical practice.

== Medical career ==
Murphy has traveled as a medical missionary. When he was 20 years old, he spent a summer in Bihar, India, working in a Catholic leprosy hospital. Murphy performed medical missionary work in Haiti after the 2010 earthquake.

Murphy served as president of a medical practice and also as Chief of Staff of Vidant Medical Center. He was a member of the faculty at the Brody School of Medicine at East Carolina University and served as Davidson College Alumni President from 2015 to 2017 while also serving on the board of trustees.

In 2017, Murphy received a Distinguished Leadership Award from the American Association of Clinical Urologists.

In 2019, Murphy received a Distinguished Medical Alumnus Award from the University of North Carolina School of Medicine.

== North Carolina General Assembly ==
=== Elections ===
Murphy was appointed to the North Carolina General Assembly in November 2015 and served the 9th District of Pitt County, to finish the term of Brian Brown, who had resigned.

On November 8, 2016, he was elected to the seat, defeating Brian Farkas with 22,540 votes (57.52%) to Farkas's 16,648 (42.48%).

Murphy was reelected in 2018, defeating Kristoffer (Kris) Rixon.

=== Tenure ===
During his second term in the General Assembly, Murphy served as Senior Chair of Health Policy and championed several health care initiatives. In 2017, he introduced the STOP Act (Strengthen Opioid Misuse Prevention Act), North Carolina's first major legislative initiative to confront the opioid epidemic. Murphy then introduced the HOPE Act, which was intended to help law enforcement curtail drug trafficking.

Murphy introduced legislation that helped veterans get access to hyperbaric oxygen therapy as treatment for traumatic brain injuries and post-traumatic stress disorder. After the deaths of three newborns in eastern North Carolina, he introduced legislation to improve birthing standards for birth centers in North Carolina.

=== State legislative committees ===
Standing or Select Committee	Status
Alcoholic Beverage Control	Member
Appropriations	Vice-chairman
Appropriations, Health and Human Services	Chairman
Education - Universities	Member
Energy and Public Utilities	Member
Health	Chairman
Health Care Reform	Member
House Select Committee on Disaster Relief	Member
Insurance	Member

== U.S. House of Representatives ==
=== Elections ===
==== 2019 special ====
In 2019, Murphy announced his candidacy for the United States House of Representatives special election in North Carolina's 3rd congressional district to replace Walter B. Jones Jr., who died in office. Murphy won the runoff on July 9, 2019, against pediatrician Joan Perry, 59.7% to 40.3%. In the September 10 general election, he defeated former Greenville Mayor Allen M. Thomas, 61.7% to 37.5%.

==== 2020 ====
In 2020, Murphy was unopposed in the Republican primary for his seat. He won the general election over Democratic nominee Daryl Farrow with 63.5% of the vote.

=== Committee assignments ===
For the 119th Congress:

- Committee on House Administration
  - Subcommittee on Elections
- Committee on Veterans' Affairs
  - Subcommittee on Health
- Committee on Ways and Means
  - Subcommittee on Health
  - Subcommittee on Trade
- Joint Committee on Printing

=== Caucus memberships ===
For the 118th Congress:

- Doctors Caucus
- Military Depot and Industrial Facilities Caucus
- Southern Border Caucus
- Shipbuilding Caucus
- Taiwan Caucus
- Conservative Climate Caucus
- Republican Study Committee
- Congressional Coalition on Adoption
- Congressional Western Caucus

=== Tenure ===
On March 19, 2024, Murphy introduced a bill to the 118th Congress that would amend the Higher Education Act of 1965. The amendment would ban graduate medical schools with diversity, equity and inclusion training and offices from receiving any federal funds.

In an opinion piece in the Wall Street Journal, Murphy wrote that DEI training is "dangerous everywhere" and that it will lead to "future physicians less qualified to meet patients' needs."

== Political positions ==
=== Chinese espionage ===
As a result of Chinese espionage at American universities, Murphy introduced the INFLUENCE Act, aimed at reducing the number of Chinese nationals attending American higher education institutions. While requiring higher education institutions to report gifts of $50,000 or more from a foreign source, Murphy's legislation also establishes interagency coordination on the enforcement of any violations exposing U.S. national security projects.

=== Joe Biden ===
During the 2020 presidential campaign, Murphy claimed on Twitter that Joe Biden "obviously is fighting the ravages of dementia." Questioned about the assertion by a reporter, Murphy, a urologist, said he was only echoing what the public thinks. "The majority of American people believe he does have dementia", he said. Murphy also claimed Biden had "so much plastic surgery".

=== Kamala Harris ===
In an October 2020 tweet that later was deleted, Murphy called Democratic vice presidential nominee Kamala Harris a "walking disaster" who "was only picked for her color and her race".

=== Controversial 9/11 tweet ===
Murphy was condemned for a tweet directed at Representative Ilhan Omar, a Muslim.

"Heartbroken to learn another CP was killed while protecting the Capitol", Omar wrote after an April 2 incident. "My thoughts and prayers go out to the officer's family and the entire Capitol Police force. The death toll would have been worse if the assailant had an AR-15 instead of a knife." Murphy responded, "Would have been worse if they had been flying planes into the buildings also".

=== Texas v. Pennsylvania ===
In December 2020, Murphy was one of 126 Republican members of the House of Representatives to sign an amicus brief in support of Texas v. Pennsylvania, a lawsuit filed at the U.S. Supreme Court contesting the results of the 2020 presidential election, in which Biden defeated Trump. The Supreme Court declined to hear the case on the basis that Texas lacked standing under Article III of the Constitution to challenge the results of an election held by another state.

=== Objection during 2021 United States Electoral College vote count ===
In January 2021, Murphy was one of several Republican members of the House, led by Representative Mo Brooks of Alabama and Senator Josh Hawley of Missouri, who declared that they would formally object to the counting of the electoral votes of five swing states won by Biden during the January 6 joint session. The objections would then trigger votes from both houses.

At least 140 House Republicans reportedly planned to vote against the counting of electoral votes, despite the lack of any credible allegation of an irregularity that would have affected the election, and the allegations' rejections by courts, election officials, the Electoral College, and others, and despite the fact that almost all of the Republican objectors had "just won elections in the very same balloting they are now claiming was fraudulently administered".

Murphy said in a press release the day before the joint session, "I have been quite vocal in stating that to preserve the integrity of our elections, we must fight to ensure that every voice is heard, every legal vote is counted, and every count is confirmed", adding that he believed the actions of executive officials and judges in several states were "at best troubling and at worst seditious."

After the storming of the United States Capitol by a mob of rioters supporting Trump's attempts to overturn the 2020 presidential election, Murphy voted to agree with the objection to Pennsylvania's results.

=== Second impeachment of Donald Trump ===
Murphy did not cast a vote on Trump's second impeachment on January 13, 2021. He released a statement that he "strongly opposed" the impeachment but he would miss the vote because he was with his wife as she recovered from a surgery.

==== Gaza ====
Murphy compared the Israeli invasion of the Gaza Strip to the United States war against Japan and suggested Israel would be justified in applying military force comparable to that of the atomic bombings of Hiroshima and Nagasaki. "If you look at what imperial Japan did to the United States, we came back and said basically you're going to have to unconditionally surrender, and when they didn't, we had to drop the two atomic bombs on them. This is where Israel has every single right in the world to press this conflict further," Murphy said.

== Personal life ==
Murphy lives in Greenville, North Carolina. He is Catholic. Murphy was diagnosed with a pitutuitary macroadenoma in May 2024. He received follow-up treatment in December 2025.

== Electoral history ==
North Carolina 3rd Congressional District Special Republican Primary, 2019
Party	Candidate	Votes	%
Republican	Greg Murphy	9,530	22.51
Republican	Joan Perry	6,536	15.44
Republican	Phil Shepard	5,101	12.05
Republican	Michael Speciale	4,022	9.50
Republican	Phil Law	3,690	8.72
Republican	Eric Rouse	3,258	7.70
Republican	Jeff Moore	2,280	5.39
Republican	Francis X. De Luca	1,670	3.95
Republican	Celeste Cairns	1,467	3.47
Republican	Chimer Davis Clark Jr.	1,092	2.58
Republican	Michele Nix	915	2.16
Republican	Graham Boyd	897	2.12
Republican	Paul Beaumont	805	1.90
Republican	Mike Payment	537	1.27
Republican	Don Cox	251	0.59
Republican	Kevin Baiko	171	0.40
Republican	Gary Ceres	108	0.26
Total votes		42,330	100.0

North Carolina 3rd Congressional District Special Run-off Republican Primary, 2019
Party	Candidate	Votes	%
Republican	Greg Murphy	21,481	59.65
Republican	Joan Perry	14,530	40.35
Total votes		36,011	100.0

North Carolina 3rd Congressional District Special Election, 2019
Party	Candidate	Votes	%
Republican	Greg Murphy	70,407	61.74
Democratic	Allen M. Thomas	42,738	37.47
Constitution	Greg Holt	507	0.44
Libertarian	Tim Harris	394	0.35
Total votes		114,046	100.0

North Carolina 3rd Congressional District General Election, 2020
Party	Candidate	Votes	%
Republican	Greg Murphy (incumbent)	227,462	63.5
Democratic	Daryl Farrow	131,011	36.5
Total votes		358,473	100.0

North Carolina 3rd Congressional District Republican Primary, 2022
Party	Candidate	Votes	%
Republican	Greg Murphy (incumbent)	50,123	75.7
Republican	Tony Cowden	9,332	14.1
Republican	Eric Earhart	3,274	4.9
Republican	George Papastrat	1,789	2.7
Republican	Brian Michael Friend	1,698	2.6
Total votes		66,216	100.0

North Carolina 3rd Congressional District General Election, 2022
Party	Candidate	Votes	%
Republican	Greg Murphy (incumbent)	166,520	66.9
Democratic	Barbara Gaskins	82,378	33.1
Total votes		247,898	100.0

North Carolina 3rd Congressional District General Election, 2024
Party	Candidate	Votes	%
Republican	Greg Murphy (incumbent)	248,276	77.4
Libertarian	Gheorghe Cormos	72,565	22.6
Total votes		320,841	100.0
Republican hold			

North Carolina 3rd Congressional District General Election, 2026
Party	Candidate	Votes	%
Democratic	Raymond Smith	118,488	49.43
Republican	Greg Murphy (incumbent)	118,195	49.31
Libertarian	Daniel Cavender	3,007	1.25
Total votes		239,690	100.0
Democratic gain from Republican			

U.S. House of Representatives
Preceded by Walter B. Jones Jr.	Member of the U.S. House of Representatives from North Carolina's 3rd congressional district 2019–present	Incumbent
U.S. order of precedence (ceremonial)
Preceded by Jeff Van Drew	United States representatives by seniority 235th	Succeeded by Tom Tiffany
