= Marian N. McLawhorn =

American politician

Marian Nelson McLawhorn
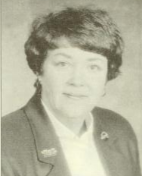
- NcLawhorn in the 1999 legislative manual

Member of the North Carolina House of Representatives from the 9th district
- In office January 1, 1999 – January 1, 2013
- Preceded by: Henry Aldridge
- Succeeded by: Brian Brown

Personal details
- Party: Democratic
- Profession: Librarian, politician

Marian Nelson McLawhorn is an American politician and former Democratic member of the North Carolina General Assembly, representing Pitt County's 9th House district from 1999 to 2013. A resident of Grifton, North Carolina, McLawhorn served seven terms in the state House, where she held the position of Democratic Whip.

She was first elected in 1998, defeating Republican incumbent Henry Aldridge. McLawhorn was re-elected after defeating Republican candidates Wayne Holloman in the November 2000 election and Judy Eagle in the November 2002 election. She was unopposed for a fourth term in the 2004 election. McLawhorn defeated Tony Moore in the November 2006 election, Ginny Cooper in the November 2008 election, and Stan Larson in the November 2010 election.

McLawhorn lost her bid for reelection in 2012 to Republican Brian Brown. The next Democrat to hold the seat was Brian Farkas, elected in November 2020.

Prior to her service as a state representative, McLawhorn served as mayor for the town of Grifton. She is a former librarian and made education a primary policy focus during her public service.

North Carolina House of Representatives
Preceded by Henry Aldridge	Member of the North Carolina House of Representatives from the 9th district 1999-2013	Succeeded by Brian Brown
