= Charles McLawhorn =

American politician

Charles L. McLawhorn (July 13, 1927 – February 5, 2000) was a Democratic Party member of the North Carolina House of Representatives.

McLawhorn was born in Winterville, North Carolina, in Pitt County, on July 13, 1927. He attended Ayden High School and Oak Ridge Military Academy, followed by North Carolina State University. He served as a Pitt County Commissioner and was elected to the North Carolina House in 1990. He lost his Ninth District seat to Republican Henry Aldridge in the November 1994 election.

McLawhorn died in Winterville on February 5, 2000.
