= North Carolina's 8th House district =

American legislative district

North Carolina's 8th State House of Representatives district
Representative
Gloristine Brown; D–Bethel
- Demographics: 43% White; 44% Black; 7% Hispanic; 2% Asian; 3% Multiracial
- Population (2024): 89,255

North Carolina's 8th House district is one of 120 districts in the North Carolina House of Representatives. It has been represented by Democrat Gloristine Brown since 2023.

== Geography ==
Since 2023, the district has included part of Pitt County. The district overlaps with the 5th Senate district.

== District officeholders ==
=== Multi-member district ===
Representative	Party	Dates	Notes	Representative	Party	Dates	Notes	Representative	Party	Dates	Notes	Representative	Party	Dates	Notes	Counties
District created January 1, 1967.
H. Horton Rountree (Greenville)	Democratic	January 1, 1967 – January 1, 1981		W. A. "Red" Forbes (Winterville)	Democratic	January 1, 1967 – January 1, 1969	Redistricted from the Pitt County district.									1967–1973; All of Pitt County.
H. Horton Rountree (Greenville)	Democratic	January 1, 1967 – January 1, 1981		David Reid Jr. (Greenville)	Democratic	January 1, 1969 – January 1, 1971										1967–1973; All of Pitt County.
H. Horton Rountree (Greenville)	Democratic	January 1, 1967 – January 1, 1981		Sam Bundy (Farmville)	Democratic	January 1, 1971 – January 1, 1983	Redistricted to the 9th district.									1967–1973; All of Pitt County.
H. Horton Rountree (Greenville)	Democratic	January 1, 1967 – January 1, 1981		Sam Bundy (Farmville)	Democratic	January 1, 1971 – January 1, 1983	Redistricted to the 9th district.									1973–1983; All of Greene and Pitt counties.
Ed Warren (Greenville)	Democratic	January 1, 1981 – January 1, 1983	Redistricted to the 9th district.	Sam Bundy (Farmville)	Democratic	January 1, 1971 – January 1, 1983	Redistricted to the 9th district.									1973–1983; All of Greene and Pitt counties.
Allen Barbee (Spring Hope)	Democratic	January 1, 1983 – January 1, 1985	Redistricted from the 7th district. Redistricted to the 72nd district.	Tom Matthews (Rocky Mount)	Democratic	January 1, 1983 – January 1, 1985	Redistricted to the 72nd district.	Josephus Mavretic (Tarboro)	Democratic	January 1, 1983 – January 1, 1985	Redistricted from the 7th district. Redistricted to the single-member district.	Jeanne Fenner (Wilson)	Democratic	January 1, 1983 – January 1, 1985	Redistricted from the 7th district. Redistricted to the 71st district.	1983–1985; All of Nash, Edgecombe, and Wilson counties.

=== Single-member district ===
Representative	Party	Dates	Notes	Counties
Josephus Mavretic (Tarboro)	Democratic	January 1, 1985 – January 1, 1993	Redistricted from the multi-member district. Redistricted to the 71st district.	1985–1993; Parts of Nash and Edgecombe counties.
Linwood Mercer (Farmville)	Democratic	January 1, 1993 – January 1, 1999		1993–2003; Parts of Greene, Pitt, Edgecombe, and Martin Counties.
Edith Warren (Farmville)	Democratic	January 1, 1999 – January 1, 2013	Retired.	1993–2003; Parts of Greene, Pitt, Edgecombe, and Martin Counties.
Edith Warren (Farmville)	Democratic	January 1, 1999 – January 1, 2013	Retired.	2003–2005; All of Greene County. Parts of Pitt and Martin counties.
Edith Warren (Farmville)	Democratic	January 1, 1999 – January 1, 2013	Retired.	2005–2013; All of Martin County. Part of Pitt County.
Susan Martin (Wilson)	Republican	January 1, 2013 – January 1, 2019	Retired.	2013–2019; Parts of Pitt and Wilson counties.
Kandie Smith (Greenville)	Democratic	January 1, 2019 – January 1, 2023	Retired to run for State Senate.	2019–Present; Part of Pitt County.
Gloristine Brown (Bethel)	Democratic	January 1, 2023 – Present		2019–Present; Part of Pitt County.

== Election results ==
=== 2024 ===
North Carolina House of Representatives 8th district general election, 2024
Party	Candidate	Votes	%
Democratic	Gloristine Brown (incumbent)	22.722	64.03%
Republican	Angelene Mitchell	12,764	35.97%
Total votes		35,486	100%
Democratic hold			

=== 2022 ===
North Carolina House of Representatives 8th district Democratic primary election, 2022
Party	Candidate	Votes	%
Democratic	Gloristine Brown	3,031	59.11%
Democratic	Sharon McDonald Evans	2,097	40.89%
Total votes		5,128	100%

North Carolina House of Representatives 8th district general election, 2022
Party	Candidate	Votes	%
Democratic	Gloristine Brown	13,116	53.57%
Republican	Charles "Drock" Vincent	11,366	46.43%
Total votes		24,482	100%
Democratic hold			

=== 2020 ===
North Carolina House of Representatives 8th district general election, 2020
Party	Candidate	Votes	%
Democratic	Kandie Smith (incumbent)	23,739	60.21%
Republican	Tony Moore	15,685	39.79%
Total votes		39,424	100%
Democratic hold			

=== 2018 ===
North Carolina House of Representatives 8th district Democratic primary election, 2018
Party	Candidate	Votes	%
Democratic	Kandie Smith	2,791	50.04%
Democratic	Mildred Atkinson Council	1,988	35.64%
Democratic	Ernest T. Reeves	799	14.32%
Total votes		5,578	100%

North Carolina House of Representatives 8th district general election, 2018
Party	Candidate	Votes	%
Democratic	Kandie Smith	15,570	64.65%
Republican	Brenda Letchworth Smith	8,515	35.35%
Total votes		24,085	100%
Democratic gain from Republican			

=== 2016 ===
North Carolina House of Representatives 8th district general election, 2016
Party	Candidate	Votes	%
Republican	Susan Martin (incumbent)	21,329	50.19%
Democratic	Charlie Pat Farris	21,166	49.81%
Total votes		42,495	100%
Republican hold			

=== 2014 ===
North Carolina House of Representatives 8th district general election, 2014
Party	Candidate	Votes	%
Republican	Susan Martin (incumbent)	17,035	60.80%
Democratic	Bobi Gregory	10,981	39.20%
Total votes		28,016	100%
Republican hold			

=== 2012 ===
North Carolina House of Representatives 8th district general election, 2012
Party	Candidate	Votes	%
Republican	Susan Martin	24,019	57.19%
Democratic	Mark Bibbs	17,982	42.81%
Total votes		42,001	100%
Republican gain from Democratic			

=== 2010 ===
North Carolina House of Representatives 8th district Democratic primary election, 2010
Party	Candidate	Votes	%
Democratic	Edith Warren (incumbent)	5,319	62.55%
Democratic	Mildred A. Council	3,184	37.45%
Total votes		8,503	100%

North Carolina House of Representatives 8th district general election, 2010
Party	Candidate	Votes	%
Democratic	Edith Warren (incumbent)	14,814	100%
Total votes		14,814	100%
Democratic hold			

=== 2008 ===
North Carolina House of Representatives 8th district Democratic primary election, 2008
Party	Candidate	Votes	%
Democratic	Edith Warren (incumbent)	8,599	60.83%
Democratic	Ronnie Smith	5,536	39.17%
Total votes		14,135	100%

North Carolina House of Representatives 8th district general election, 2008
Party	Candidate	Votes	%
Democratic	Edith Warren (incumbent)	25,313	100%
Total votes		25,313	100%
Democratic hold			

=== 2006 ===
North Carolina House of Representatives 8th district Democratic primary election, 2006
Party	Candidate	Votes	%
Democratic	Edith Warren (incumbent)	4,585	61.90%
Democratic	Derek K. Brown	2,822	38.10%
Total votes		7,407	100%

North Carolina House of Representatives 8th district general election, 2006
Party	Candidate	Votes	%
Democratic	Edith Warren (incumbent)	8,843	100%
Total votes		8,843	100%
Democratic hold			

=== 2004 ===
North Carolina House of Representatives 8th district Democratic primary election, 2004
Party	Candidate	Votes	%
Democratic	Edith Warren (incumbent)	4,472	63.52%
Democratic	Mary Lawrence Williams	2,568	36.48%
Total votes		7,040	100%

North Carolina House of Representatives 8th district general election, 2004
Party	Candidate	Votes	%
Democratic	Edith Warren (incumbent)	17,033	74.04%
Republican	Curt Hendrix	5,973	25.96%
Total votes		23,006	100%
Democratic hold			

=== 2002 ===
North Carolina House of Representatives 8th district Democratic primary election, 2002
Party	Candidate	Votes	%
Democratic	Edith Warren (incumbent)	5,309	64.25%
Democratic	Jim Rouse	2,954	35.75%
Total votes		8,263	100%

North Carolina House of Representatives 8th district general election, 2002
Party	Candidate	Votes	%
Democratic	Edith Warren (incumbent)	11,809	100%
Total votes		11,809	100%
Democratic hold			

=== 2000 ===
North Carolina House of Representatives 8th district Democratic primary election, 2000
Party	Candidate	Votes	%
Democratic	Edith Warren (incumbent)	4,123	57.24%
Democratic	Jim Rouse	3,080	42.76%
Total votes		7,203	100%

North Carolina House of Representatives 8th district general election, 2000
Party	Candidate	Votes	%
Democratic	Edith Warren (incumbent)	13,051	100%
Total votes		13,051	100%
Democratic hold			
