= Susan Martin (politician) =

American politician

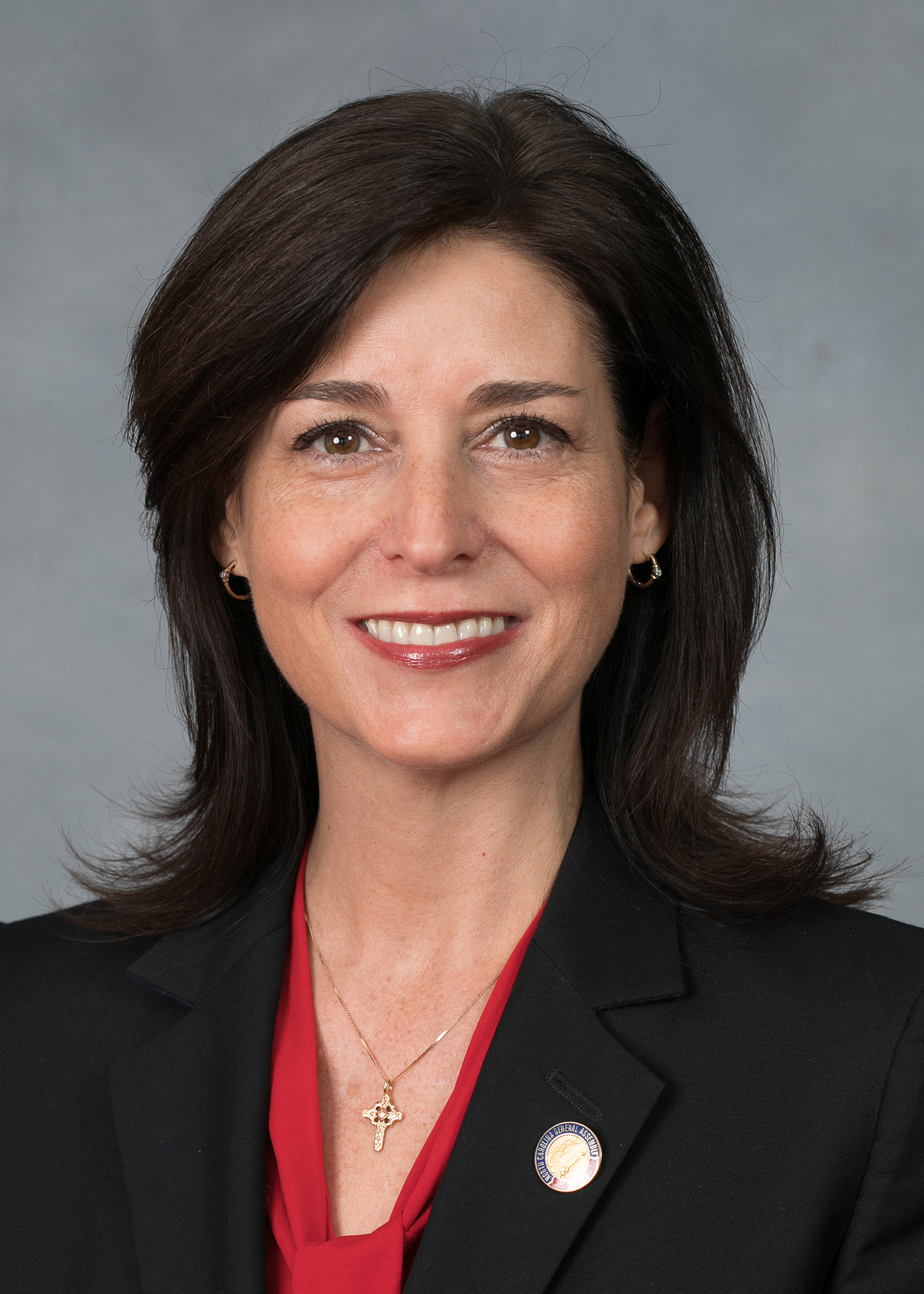

Member of the North Carolina House of Representatives from the 8th district
- In office January 1, 2013 – January 1, 2019
- Preceded by: Edith Warren
- Succeeded by: Kandie Smith

Personal details
- Party: Republican
- Spouse: Lew
- Children: 2

Susan Martin is a former Republican member of the North Carolina House of Representatives, who represented the 8th district, including constituents in Wilson and Pitt counties.

== Career ==
Martin was elected on November 6, 2012. She received 57.19% of the vote while her Democratic opponent Mark Bibbs received 42.81%. In November 2017, Martin announced that she would not be running for a fourth term to the State House, due to redistricting. After retiring from the State House in 2018, Martin announced that she would be moving to Tennessee.

== Electoral history ==
=== 2016 ===
North Carolina House of Representatives 8th district general election, 2016
Party	Candidate	Votes	%
Republican	Susan Martin (incumbent)	21,329	50.19%
Democratic	Charlie Pat Farris	21,166	49.81%
Total votes		42,495	100%
Republican hold			

=== 2014 ===
North Carolina House of Representatives 8th district general election, 2014
Party	Candidate	Votes	%
Republican	Susan Martin (incumbent)	17,035	60.80%
Democratic	Bobi Gregory	10,981	39.20%
Total votes		28,016	100%
Republican hold			

=== 2012 ===
North Carolina House of Representatives 8th district general election, 2012
Party	Candidate	Votes	%
Republican	Susan Martin	24,019	57.19%
Democratic	Mark Bibbs	17,982	42.81%
Total votes		42,001	100%
Republican gain from Democratic			

== Committee assignments ==
=== 2017-2018 session ===
- Finance (Chair)
- Commerce and Job Development (Chair)
- Regulatory Reform (Vice Chair)
- Agriculture
- Energy and Public Utilities
- Elections and Ethics Law
- University Board of Governors Nominating
- Rules, Calendar, and Operations of the House

=== 2015-2016 session ===
- Finance (Chair)
- Commerce and Job Development (Vice Chair)
- Agriculture
- Education - Universities
- Health
- Public Utilities
- Elections
- Homeland Security, Military, and Veterans Affairs

=== 2013-2014 session ===
- Agriculture
- Appropriations
- Commerce and Job Development
- Education
- Health and Human Services
- Public Utilities and Energy
- Regulatory Reform

North Carolina House of Representatives
Preceded by Edith Warren	Member of the North Carolina House of Representatives from the 8th district 2013–2019	Succeeded by Kandie Smith
