= Oakley, North Carolina =

Oakley, North Carolina may refer to:

- Oakley, Buncombe County, North Carolina, a populated place in Asheville in Buncombe County, North Carolina
- Oakley, Pitt County, North Carolina, a populated place in Pitt County, North Carolina
