= List of mayors of Greenville, North Carolina =

Mayors of the city of Greenville, North Carolina, USA

The following is a list of mayors of the city of Greenville, North Carolina, USA. Greenville is in Pitt County.

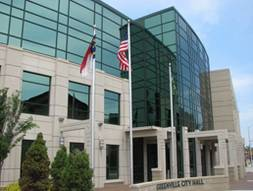
Greenville City Hall building in North Carolina, US, in 2008

== Mayors ==
- W.H. Long, ca.1902
- F.M. Wooten, ca.1907
- Albion Dunn, ca.1916
- D.M. Clark, ca.1926
- Marvin K. Blount, ca.1936
- Jack Spain, ca.1940
- John H. Boyd Jr., ca.1947
- L. D. Page, 1953
- W. L. Whedbee, 1953–1957
- S. Eugene West, 1957–1961, 1963–1975
- Charles M. King, 1961–1963
- Percy R. Cox, 1975–1979, 1981–1983
- Donald C. McGlohon, 1979–1981
- Janice B. Buck, 1983–1985
- Leslie H. Garner, 1985–1987
- Edward E. Carter, 1987–1989
- Nancy M. Jenkins, 1989–2001
- Don Parrott, 2001–2007
- Patricia Dunn, 2007–2011
- Allen M. Thomas, 2011–2017
- Kandie Smith, 2017
- P.J. Connelly, 2017–present

== See also ==
- Greenville history
