= Ashley Sheppard =

American football player (born 1969)

No. 59, 96
- Position: Linebacker

Personal information
- Born: January 21, 1969 (age 57); Greenville, North Carolina, U.S.
- Listed height: 6 ft 3 in (1.91 m)
- Listed weight: 240 lb (109 kg)

Career information
- High school: North Pitt (Bethel, North Carolina); Fork Union Military Academy (Fork Union, Virginia)
- College: Clemson
- NFL draft: 1993: 4th round, 106th overall pick

Career history
- Minnesota Vikings (1993–1994); Jacksonville Jaguars (1995); Minnesota Vikings (1995); St. Louis Rams (1995)

Awards and highlights
- Second-team All-ACC (1992)

Career NFL statistics
- Tackles: 11
- Sacks: 1.5
- Fumble recoveries: 1
- Stats at Pro Football Reference

Ashley Guy Sheppard (born January 21, 1969) is an American former professional football player who was a linebacker for three seasons in the National Football League (NFL) with the Minnesota Vikings, Jacksonville Jaguars and St. Louis Rams. He was selected by the Vikings in the fourth round of the 1993 NFL draft. He played college football for the Clemson Tigers. Sheppard first enrolled at North Pitt High School in Bethel, North Carolina, before transferring to Fork Union Military Academy in Fork Union, Virginia.

== Professional career ==
Sheppard was selected by the Minnesota Vikings with the 106th pick in the 1993 NFL draft and signed with the team on July 17, 1993. He played in seventeen games for the Vikings from 1993 to 1994. He was released by the Vikings on August 27, 1995.

Sheppard signed with the Jacksonville Jaguars on August 28, 1995. He played in two games for the Jaguars during the 1995 season. He was released by the Jaguars on September 18, 1995.

Sheppard was signed by the Vikings on November 20, 1995. He was released by the team on December 7 without appearing in a game.

Sheppard signed with the St. Louis Rams on December 13, 1995. He played in two games for the Rams in 1995 before being released on August 19, 1996.
