= Benjamin May-Lewis House =

Historic house in North Carolina, United States

- U.S. National Register of Historic Places
- Location within North Carolina Location within the United States
- Location: US 264-A, near Farmville, North Carolina
- Coordinates: 35°36′35″N 77°38′36″W
- Area: 202 acres (82 ha)
- Architectural style: Greek Revival, Federal
- NRHP reference No.: 85001337
- Added to NRHP: June 20, 1985

Benjamin May-Lewis House is a historic home located near Farmville, Pitt County, North Carolina. It was built in the 1830s, as a two-story, three-bay, single pile, Federal style frame dwelling with a rear shed wing. It was remodeled in the 1850s with Greek Revival style design elements. Also on the property are the contributing smokehouse and other farm related outbuildings.

It was added to the National Register of Historic Places in 1985.
