= Edith D. Warren =

American politician (1937–2023)

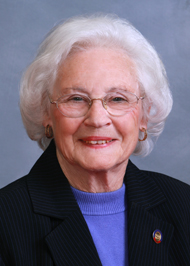
- Official portrait of Warren in 2011

Member of the North Carolina House of Representatives from the 8th district
- In office January 1, 1999 – January 1, 2013
- Preceded by: Linwood Eborn Mercer
- Succeeded by: Susan Martin

Personal details
- Born: January 29, 1937 Edgecombe County, North Carolina, U.S.
- Died: November 11, 2023 (aged 86)
- Party: Democratic
- Spouse: Billy
- Children: 3
- Education: East Carolina University (BS, MA)
- Profession: educator, business owner

Edith D. Warren (January 29, 1937 – November 11, 2023) was an American Democratic member of the North Carolina General Assembly, representing the state's eighth House district from 1999 until 2012. Her district included all of Martin County and part of Pitt County.

Warren retired from her job as an educator in Farmville, North Carolina, and died on November 11, 2023, at the age of 86. All flags in the state would be put at half-staff in her honor on November 18.

North Carolina House of Representatives
Preceded by Linwood Eborn Mercer	Member of the North Carolina House of Representatives from the 8th district 1999–2013	Succeeded by Susan Martin
