= Gloristine Brown =

American politician from North Carolina

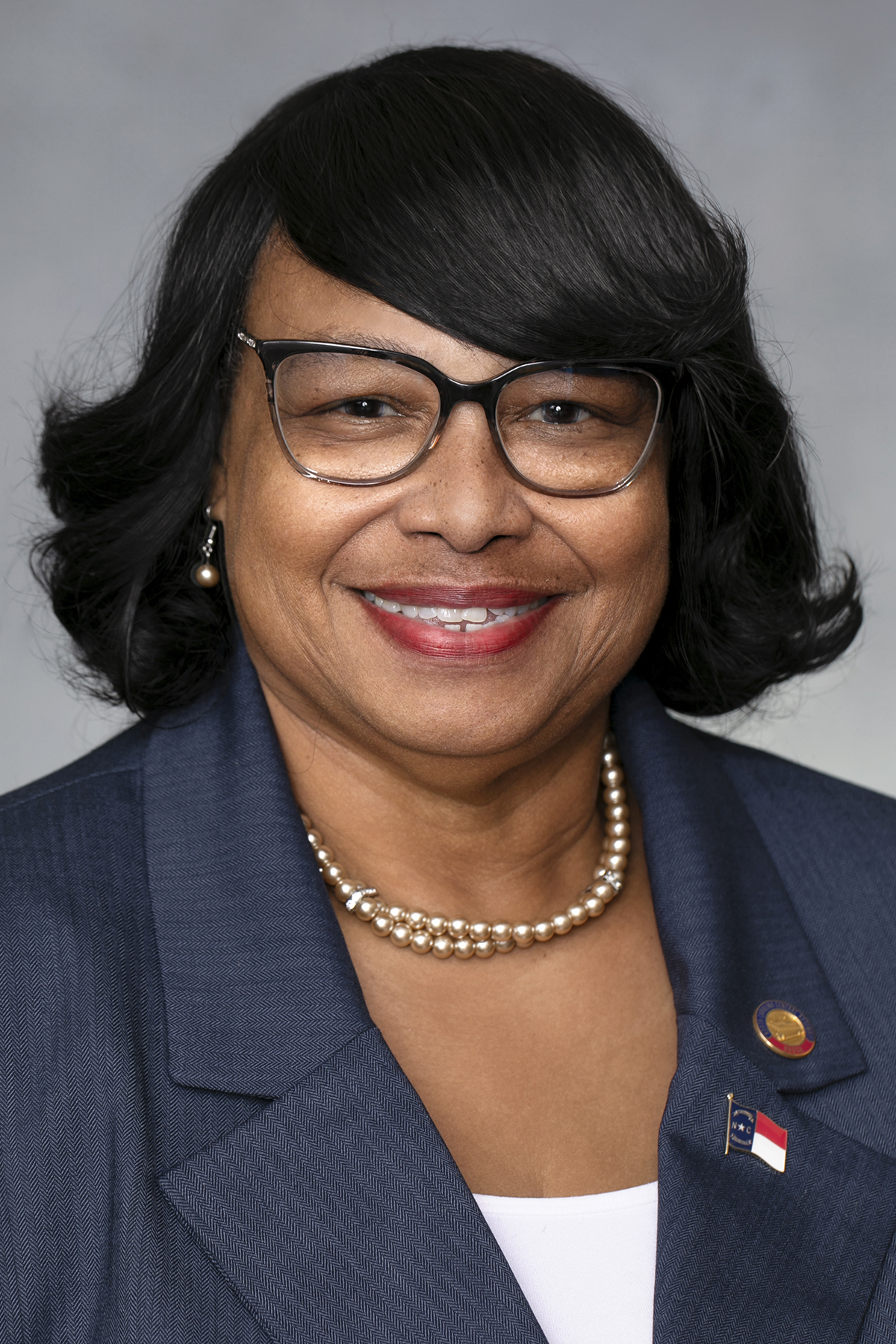

Minority Whip of the North Carolina House of Representatives
- Incumbent
- Assumed office January 1, 2025 Serving with Ya Liu and Amos Quick
- Leader: Robert T. Reives, II
- Preceded by: Terry M. Brown Jr. Marcia Morey

Member of the North Carolina House of Representatives from the 8th district
- Incumbent
- Assumed office January 1, 2023
- Preceded by: Kandie Smith

Personal details
- Party: Democratic
- Education: B.S. in computer information systems, master in public administration
- Alma mater: Strayer University, graduated 2013

Gloristine Brown is an American politician and member of the North Carolina House of Representatives for the 8th district, which includes Pitt County. A Democrat, she was first elected in 2022 in the 2022 North Carolina House of Representatives election with 13,116 votes against Republican opponent Charles Vincent. She has also been the mayor of Bethel, North Carolina, since 2014 and been part of the Bethel Town Board since 1999. Brown is also vice chairwoman of Pitt Community College’s Board of Trustees.

== Election History ==
=== 2024 ===
N.C. House of Representatives 8th district General Election
Party	Candidate	Votes	%
Democratic	Gloristine Brown (incumbent)	22.722	64.03%
Republican	Angelene Mitchell	12,764	35.97%
Total votes		35,486	100%
Democratic hold			

=== 2022 ===
N.C. House of Representatives 8th district general election
Party	Candidate	Votes	%
Democratic	Gloristine Brown	13,116	53.57%
Republican	Charles "Drock" Vincent	11,366	46.43%
Total votes		24,482	100%
Democratic hold			

N.C House of Representatives 8th district Democratic primary
Party	Candidate	Votes	%
Democratic	Gloristine Brown	3,031	59.11%
Democratic	Sharon McDonald Evans	2,097	40.89%
Total votes		5,128	100%

North Carolina House of Representatives
Preceded by Kandie Smith	Member of the North Carolina House of Representatives from the 8th district 2023-Present	Incumbent
