= Simpson, North Carolina =

- Village
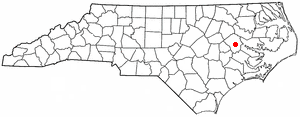
- Location of Simpson, North Carolina
- Coordinates: 35°34′31″N 77°16′43″W
- Country: United States
- State: North Carolina
- County: Pitt

Area
  - Total: 0.37 sq mi (0.96 km^{2})
  - Land: 0.37 sq mi (0.96 km^{2})
  - Water: 0 sq mi (0.00 km^{2})
- Elevation: 62 ft (19 m)

Population (2020)
  - Total: 390
  - Density: 1,056.8/sq mi (408.05/km^{2})
- Time zone: UTC-5 (Eastern (EST))
  - Summer (DST): UTC-4 (EDT)
- ZIP code: 27879
- Area code: 252
- FIPS code: 37-62040
- GNIS feature ID: 2407548
- Website: www.villageofsimpsonnc.com

Simpson is a village in Pitt County, North Carolina, United States. The population was 390 at the 2020 census. The village is a part of the Greenville Metropolitan Area.

== Geography ==
According to the United States Census Bureau, the village has a total area of 0.4 square miles (1.0 km^{2}), all land.

== Demographics ==
Historical population
Census	Pop.	Note	%±
1930	209		—
1980	407		—
1990	410		0.7%
2000	464		13.2%
2010	416		−10.3%
2020	390		−6.2%
U.S. Decennial Census

As of the census of 2000, there were 464 people, 189 households, and 131 families residing in the village. The population density was 1,260.2 inhabitants per square mile (486.6/km^{2}). There were 207 housing units at an average density of 562.2 per square mile (217.1/km^{2}). The racial makeup of the village was 56.03% White, 42.46% African American, 0.65% Native American, and 0.86% from two or more races. Hispanic or Latino of any race were 2.80% of the population.

There were 189 households, out of which 26.5% had children under the age of 18 living with them, 51.3% were married couples living together, 14.8% had a female householder with no husband present, and 30.2% were non-families. 28.0% of all households were made up of individuals, and 14.3% had someone living alone who was 65 years of age or older. The average household size was 2.46 and the average family size was 3.01.

In the village, the population was spread out, with 22.8% under the age of 18, 7.1% from 18 to 24, 29.3% from 25 to 44, 26.5% from 45 to 64, and 14.2% who were 65 years of age or older. The median age was 39 years. For every 100 females, there were 92.5 males. For every 100 females age 18 and over, there were 86.5 males.

The median income for a household in the village was $37,188, and the median income for a family was $47,500. Males had a median income of $34,464 versus $25,313 for females. The per capita income for the village was $18,541. About 14.2% of families and 13.2% of the population were below the poverty line, including 7.4% of those under age 18 and 32.7% of those age 65 or over.
