= Greg Briley =

American baseball player (born 1965)

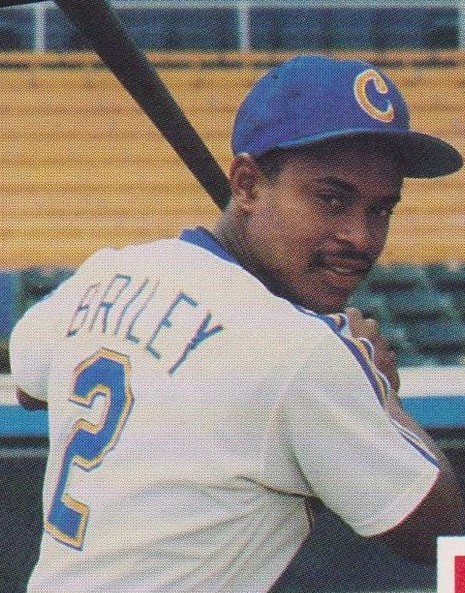
- Briley in 1987
- Outfielder
- Born: May 24, 1965 (age 61); Bethel, North Carolina, U.S.
- Batted: Left Threw: Right

MLB debut
- June 27, 1988, for the Seattle Mariners

Last MLB appearance
- September 24, 1993, for the Florida Marlins

MLB statistics
- Batting average: .253
- Home runs: 29
- Runs batted in: 135
- Stats at Baseball Reference

Teams
- Seattle Mariners (1988–1992); Florida Marlins (1993)

Gregory Briley (born May 24, 1965), nicknamed "Pee Wee", is an American former Major League Baseball outfielder who played for the Seattle Mariners and Florida Marlins from 1988 to 1993. He was also a minor league hitting coach.

Briley attended North Pitt High School in Bethel, North Carolina. He then played college baseball at Louisburg College, before playing for the North Carolina State Wolfpack for one season in 1986. In 1985, he played collegiate summer baseball with the Hyannis Mets of the Cape Cod Baseball League and was named a league all-star.

The Mariners drafted Briley in the June secondary phase of the 1986 MLB draft. He was the Chattanooga Lookouts team most valuable player in 1987 and reached the majors in 1988. He ranked second among American League rookies in 1989 with a .266 batting average and was third in home runs and runs batted in {RBI). He homered in four consecutive games from June 17–20. However, he never matched his rookie marks in home runs, RBI, or at bats in his career. He was the Mariners' opening day left fielder in 1990 but hit .246. He had a career-high 23 stolen bases in 1991 though he was caught stealing 11 times. Seattle released him after the 1992 season, and he signed with the expansion Florida Marlins, playing one season in the National League. Briley played in the minors through 1995 and also played in the Mexican League.

Briley was a minor league hitting coach from 2000 to 2015, beginning in the Pittsburgh Pirates system before moving to the Chicago White Sox organization in 2009. That year, he was the hitting coach for the Kannapolis Intimidators and later coached the Great Falls Voyagers.
