= Wahl-Coates Elementary School =

Coordinates: 35.6063°N 77.3488°W

- 2200 East Fifth Street; Greenville, North Carolina 27858

Information
- Opened: January 3, 1972
- Status: Open
- School board: Pitt County Schools
- Superintendent: Dr. Steve M. Lassiter Jr.
- Principal: Tracy Davenport
- Grades: K-5
- Enrollment: 360 students
  - Kindergarten: 57 students
  - Grade 1: 72 students
  - Grade 2: 57 students
  - Grade 3: 61 students
  - Grade 4: 67 students
  - Grade 5: 46 students
- Campus size: 17.3 acres (7.0 ha)
- Campus type: Urban
- Colors: Purple and Gold
- Mascot: Pirate
- Feeder to: C. M. Eppes Middle School, E. B. Aycock Middle School, and Junius H. Rose High School
- Affiliations: East Carolina University

Wahl-Coates Elementary School is an elementary school located in Greenville, North Carolina. It is one of 16 elementary schools located within Pitt County. It is in a unique partnership with Pitt County Schools (PCS) and East Carolina University. The university used its funds to build the facility, while PCS furnished the school. Wahl-Coates sits on 17.3 acres (7.0 ha). It used to be located in two different areas on the East Carolina campus.

== History ==
Photo of the Model School in 1918

The Model School, which was the original name of Wahl-Coates, was built on East Carolina's campus in 1914 and served as a laboratory school for the university, providing student teaching opportunities for university students. The school resulted from an April 21, 1913 meeting between former Governor Thomas Jordan Jarvis, the Chairman of the Executive Committee of East Carolina Teachers Training School, and the Board of Trustees of the Greenville Graded Schools. The two institutions entered into an agreement that would create the Model School. The original school building was located on the northwestern part of the campus. Greenville originally paid for the construction, then East Carolina paid it back. At first the building had only four rooms. A second story was added in 1917. This school building was demolished in 1927, when the new building was built.

On January 29, 1927, President Robert Herring Wright stated he wanted to build another school on the East Carolina campus. East Carolina secured funding from the North Carolina General Assembly. The second building was completed in 1927 on the northeast corner of the campus. The building architecture includes sweeping arches to match the Spanish-Mission style that occurred throughout the early buildings. On September 10, 1928, the new school opened with 257 students and nine teachers. In 1929 a second unit was constructed that added 19,360 sq.ft. A training school wing was added in 1949, a theater in 1951 and a laboratory in 1971.

In 1959, the school was renamed Wahl-Coates Laboratory School in honor of two of its early teachers. Francis Wahl and Dora E. Coates both worked with the school for 30 years. Miss Wahl was a supervising teacher from 1925-1961 and the principal from 1936 - 1961. Mrs. Coates was a critic teacher from 1922-1929, then taught in the English Department until her retirement in 1951. In 1972 the current Wahl-Coates opened its doors. Today, the former Wahl-Coates is known as the Messick Theatre Arts Building.

In the late 1960s, it was evident, due to rising enrollment, that a new Wahl-Coates was needed. The Board of Education of the Greenville City Schools and East Carolina University jointly developed the new school. Wahl-Coates is now located approximately one-half mile east of the East Carolina campus on 5th Street. It opened January 3, 1972 with approximately 500 students in grades K-6. In August 1980, the grade structure went to four through six. It changed to K-5 in August 1990. Mrs. Tracy Davenport is the current principal. Wahl-Coates is a feeder school for C. M. Eppes Middle School, E. B. Aycock Middle School and Junius H. Rose High School.

== Recognition ==
The school was a School of Distinction in 1997-1998, 1999-2000, 2000–2001, 2001-2002, 2002-2003, 2003–2004, 2004-2005 and 2005-2006. In 2007-2008 principal Will Sanderson was named Media Administrator of the Year by the North Carolina School Library Media Association.

== Enrollment ==
Wahl-Coates had 435 students in fall 2010. Of the total enrollment, eight were Asian, 14 were Hispanic, 273 were Black, 125 were White and 15 were multi-racial.
