= Black Jack, North Carolina =

Unincorporated community in North Carolina, US

Black Jack
- Unincorporated community
- Location in North Carolina
- Coordinates: 35.5018298°N 77.2477379°W
- Country: United States
- State: North Carolina
- County: Pitt
- Elevation: 46 ft (14 m)

Black Jack is an unincorporated community in Pitt County, North Carolina, United States.

== History ==
During the American Civil War, on July 18, 1863, General Edward E. Potter led a small army from New Bern to destroy the Wilmington and Weldon Railroad, passing through Black Jack. He also raided Greenville and Tarboro. A historical marker was placed in Black Jack.
