= North Pitt High School =

American public school in North Carolina

Location
- 5659 NC-11 S Bethel, North Carolina 27812; United States
- 35°44′51″N 77°21′47″W

Information
- School type: Public
- Established: 1970
- CEEB code: 340350
- Principal: Maurice Harris
- Teaching staff: 44.12 (FTE)
- Grades: 9–12
- Enrollment: 735 (2023-2024)
- Student to teacher ratio: 16.66
- Colors: Orange and blue
- Mascot: Panthers
- Website: nphs.pitt.k12.nc.us

North Pitt High School is a public high school located near the town of Bethel in Pitt County, North Carolina.

== History ==
North Pitt opened in 1970 as the consolidated high school for the "north of the river" area of Pitt County. North Pitt, as an integrated high school, was the new school for the Belvoir, Bethel, Pactolus, Stokes, and Staton House areas, all of which made up the vast farming areas north of the Tar River. Belvoir, Bethel, and Stokes-Pactolus High Schools sent all their students that year to the school, which was headed by Principal Walter Latham and Assistant Principal E.R. McNair—who was one of the earliest black administrators in the county and still worked at North Pitt, as a substitute teacher after retiring.

The school was a sister school to cross county D. H. Conley High School in Greenville and has grown in size from its original two and a half hallway design to now include four major hallways, one vocational wing, and two outside field houses.

== Notable alumni ==
- Greg Briley – former MLB player for the Seattle Mariners and Florida Marlins
- Ashley Sheppard – former NFL linebacker (attended North Pitt before transferring to Fork Union Military Academy)
