= Elizabeth Schmoke Randolph =

American educator

- Elizabeth Schmoke, from a 1936 issue of The Crisis
- Born: Elizabeth Garland Schmoke; March 18, 1917; Farmville, North Carolina
- Died: December 4, 2004 (aged 87); Charlotte, North Carolina
- Occupation: Educator
- Relatives: Kurt Schmoke (nephew)

Elizabeth "Libby" Schmoke Randolph (March 18, 1917 – December 4, 2004) was an American educator. She was a leader on school desegregation in the Charlotte-Mecklenburg Schools in the 1970s, and president of the Association for Supervision and Curriculum Development, a national professional organization. She was also a regional director of Alpha Kappa Alpha. The Charlotte-Mecklenburg Schools administrative headquarters is named the Elizabeth Schmoke Randolph Building, in her memory.

== Early life and education ==
Elizabeth Garland Schmoke was born in Farmville, North Carolina, the eldest of six children born to John Hagen Schmoke and Pearl Beatrice Johnson. Her father was a carpenter and plasterer born in Georgia, who died in 1932; her mother was a teacher. Her nephew is politician Kurt Schmoke.

Schmoke graduated from Shaw University in 1936, and earned a master's degree in English literature at the University of Michigan. She earned an advanced certificate in School Administration at the University of North Carolina at Chapel Hill in 1958. She was a member of Alpha Kappa Alpha.

== Career ==
Randolph was a teacher and school principal in Charlotte. She helped launch the district's public kindergarten program, and federally-funded Headstart program. She was associate superintendent for curriculum in the Charlotte-Mecklenburg Schools in the 1970s, when school desegregation was still in contentious progress there. She was vice-president of the North Carolina Association of Educators. She was elected president of the Association for Supervision and Curriculum Development (ASCD), a national professional organization, in 1978.

Randolph was named WBT's Charlotte's Woman of the Year in 1979. She retired from school work in 1982, but in retirement stayed active as chair of the board of trustees of North Carolina A&T State University, a trustee of her alma mater, Shaw University, and many other community and church positions. She also received honors from the Charlotte Urban League, Alpha Kappa Alpha, and Links Incorporated. She gave an oral history interviews to the Behind the Veil Oral History Project of the Duke University Center for Documentary Studies, and to the Levine Museum of the New South, both in 1993. Randolph was a member of The Links, and a regional director of Alpha Kappa Alpha.

Randolph edited a photo book, An African American Album: The Black Experience in Charlotte Mecklenburg (1992).

== Personal life and legacy ==
Elizabeth Shmoke married John Daniel Randolph. He died in 1963. She died in 2004, aged 87 years, in Charlotte. The Charlotte Observer noted at the time that "the long-time educator left her mark in innumerable ways on Charlotte, this region and the state."

The administrative headquarters of CMS in Charlotte is named for her, as is a community room at the Allegra Westbrooks Regional Library. In 2018 she was posthumously awarded the Flame Bearer Award by the Mid-Atlantic Regional Conference of Alpha Kappa Alpha.
