= Bell Arthur, North Carolina =

- Unincorporated community
- Location within North Carolina Location within the United States
- Coordinates: 35°35′28″N 77°30′46″W
- Country: United States
- State: North Carolina
- County: Pitt

Area
  - Total: 1.86 sq mi (4.82 km^{2})
  - Land: 1.86 sq mi (4.82 km^{2})
  - Water: 0 sq mi (0.00 km^{2})
- Elevation: 79 ft (24 m)

Population (2020)
  - Total: 477
  - Density: 256.2/sq mi (98.91/km^{2})
- Time zone: UTC-5 (Eastern (EST))
  - Summer (DST): UTC-4 (EDT)
- ZIP code: 27811
- Area code: 252
- GNIS feature ID: 2584308

Bell Arthur (also known as Bellarthur) is an unincorporated community and census-designated place (CDP) in Pitt County, North Carolina, United States. As of the 2020 census, Bell Arthur had a population of 477. Bell Arthur has a post office with ZIP code 27811.

== Demographics ==
Historical population
Census	Pop.	Note	%±
2020	477		—
U.S. Decennial Census
