= House, North Carolina =

Unincorporated community in North Carolina, US

Coordinates: 35°39′17″N 77°21′54″W

House is an unincorporated community in Pitt County, North Carolina, United States, north of Greenville. It lies at an elevation of 30 feet (9 m).
