= Warren Griffin Wilson =

American journalist (1934–2024)

Warren Wilson
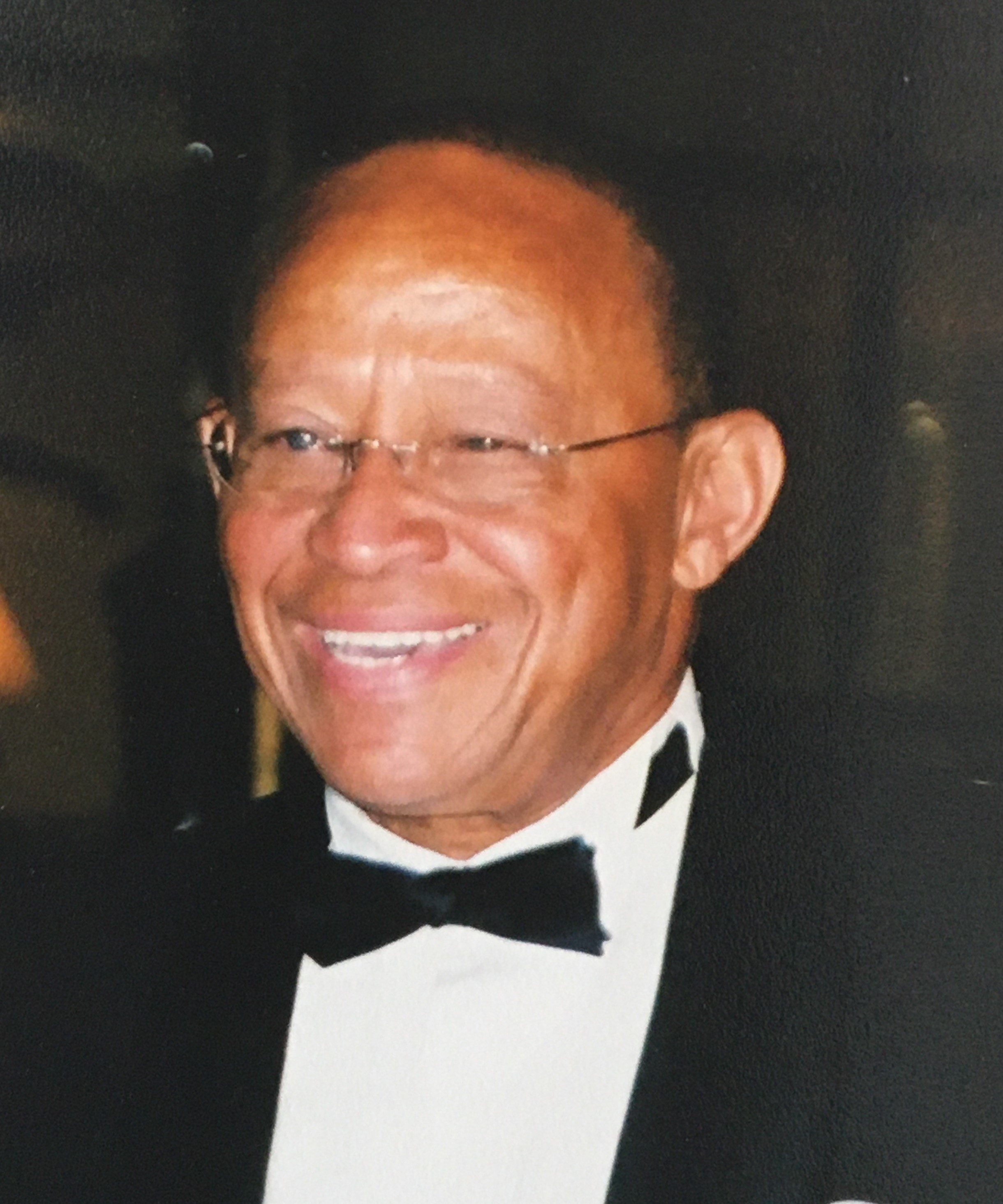
- Wilson in 2002
- Born: Warren Griffin Wilson; June 14, 1934; Bethel, North Carolina, U.S.
- Died: September 27, 2024 (aged 90); Oxnard, California, U.S.
- Occupations: News reporter, television, radio, wire services
- Years active: 1959–2005
- Notable credit(s): Emmy Award winning television news reporter for KNBC and KTLA, Los Angeles

Warren Griffin Wilson (June 14, 1934 – September 27, 2024), known professionally as Warren Wilson, was an American broadcast, radio, and wire service journalist. He was one of the first Black television journalists in Los Angeles, and earned the moniker, “America’s most surrendered newsman” for arranging fugitives wanted by local law enforcement and the FBI to surrender to him so that they could receive fair judicial treatment. During his four decade career, Wilson received multiple Emmy Awards and a Peabody Award for his team reporting of the Rodney King beating and subsequent trial.

== Early life and education ==
Warren Griffin Wilson was born on June 14, 1934, in Bethel, North Carolina, one of nine children of Elizabeth “Lizzie” (née Edwards) and Lonnie Wilson.

His parents were sharecroppers, and he grew up on a farm in Greenville, North Carolina. In high school, Wilson was a three-time MVP basketball player.

In 1952, Wilson enlisted in the United States Navy, was stationed at Naval Air Station Whidbey Island, and wrote and edited for the base newspaper. He was promoted to a staff correspondent, reporting to Vice Admiral Alfred M. Pride, commander of the U.S. Seventh Fleet.

After his military service, Wilson received an associate degree from East Los Angeles College, B.A. degree in political science from CSU-Los Angeles, and a law degree from the University of West Los Angeles School of Law.

== Career ==
Wilson was a pioneering journalist whose career spanned more than four decades and included stints working for wire services Associated Press and UPI; radio stations KABC and KFWB; and KNBC-TV, NBC and KTLA News. After the Navy, he worked as warehouse laborer and in public relations for Los Angeles County where he met Joseph Quinn, the founder of City News Service (CNS) and father of current CNS board chairman Tom Quinn. In 1959, Joseph Quinn hired Wilson as a CNS reporter.

In 1963, Wilson joined United Press International and was based in their Los Angeles bureau. During the Watts riots of 1965, Wilson was one of the few Black reporters who covered the story.

In 1968, Wilson stood directly behind Robert F. Kennedy while he was delivering his acceptance speech and moments before he was shot at the Ambassador Hotel in Los Angeles. In the aftermath, Wilson would spend the next 48 hours reporting live on the assassination of Robert F. Kennedy.

In 1969, he was hired by KNBC, the Los Angeles NBC affiliate, and became one of the first Black television journalists in a major U.S. media market. (Ken Jones was hired as a feature reporter by KTTV-TV, Los Angeles, in 1967).

Wilson would stay at KNBC for 15 years before moving to KTLA. He covered many of the top news stories that would make national headlines, including the 1973 election of L.A.’s first Black mayor, Tom Bradley; and the Hillside Strangler murders in 1977 and 1978. By 1982, Wilson developed a reputation as “America’s most surrendered newsman” for arranging the surrender of 22 fugitives on separate occasions who were wanted by local law enforcement and/or the FBI. These fugitives chose to surrender to Wilson, not the authorities, so they would receive fair judicial treatment.

In 1984, Wilson joined KTLA News at Ten, and the show would become top-rated primetime newscast in Los Angeles for twenty-one years.

In 1991, Wilson broke the Rodney King beating story, landing the first television interview with King inside his jail ward, and covering the 1992 L.A. riots after the announcement of the Rodney King trial verdict.

In 1995, Wilson secured the first long form television interview with O.J. Simpson after he was acquitted of murder in the Simpson Trial.

In 2004, Wilson filed a discrimination complaint against KTLA, alleging that the station failed to promote him from a reporter to an anchor or other higher positions and that younger, white reporters received higher compensation than he did.

Wilson retired from KTLA in 2005.

== Personal life and death ==
Wilson suffered a heart attack in 1992.

Wilson had six children: Pamela, Melissa, Elizabeth, Ronald, and Stanley, a veteran producer at CNN and co-founder of The Wilson Media Group; as well as Debra Hansen, his stepdaughter with Sylvia Martinez. His second eldest daughter, Kim, died in 2003.

Warren Wilson died at an assisted living facility in Oxnard, California, on September 27, 2024, at the age of 90.

== Awards and honors ==
In 1979, Wilson received his first Emmy Award for his investigative report “Children of the Night,” about a shelter and treatment center for juvenile prostitutes. He was nominated for an Emmy Award at least 15 times and earned six Los Angeles Area Emmy awards.

In 1991, Wilson received a Peabody Award as part of KTLA-TV's team coverage of the Rodney King beating and subsequent trial.

In 2002, Wilson received the Joseph M. Quinn Award for Journalistic Excellence and Distinction from the Los Angeles Press Club, its highest honor. The 2001 Quinn awardee was Dan Rather.

In addition, Wilson received accolades from the California Legislature, the American Civil Liberties Union, the L.A. County Board of Supervisors, the Los Angeles City Council, the Los Angeles Police Department, and the Broadcast Journalist of the Year award from the Society of Professional Journalists.
