= P.J. Connelly =

American baseball player and politician

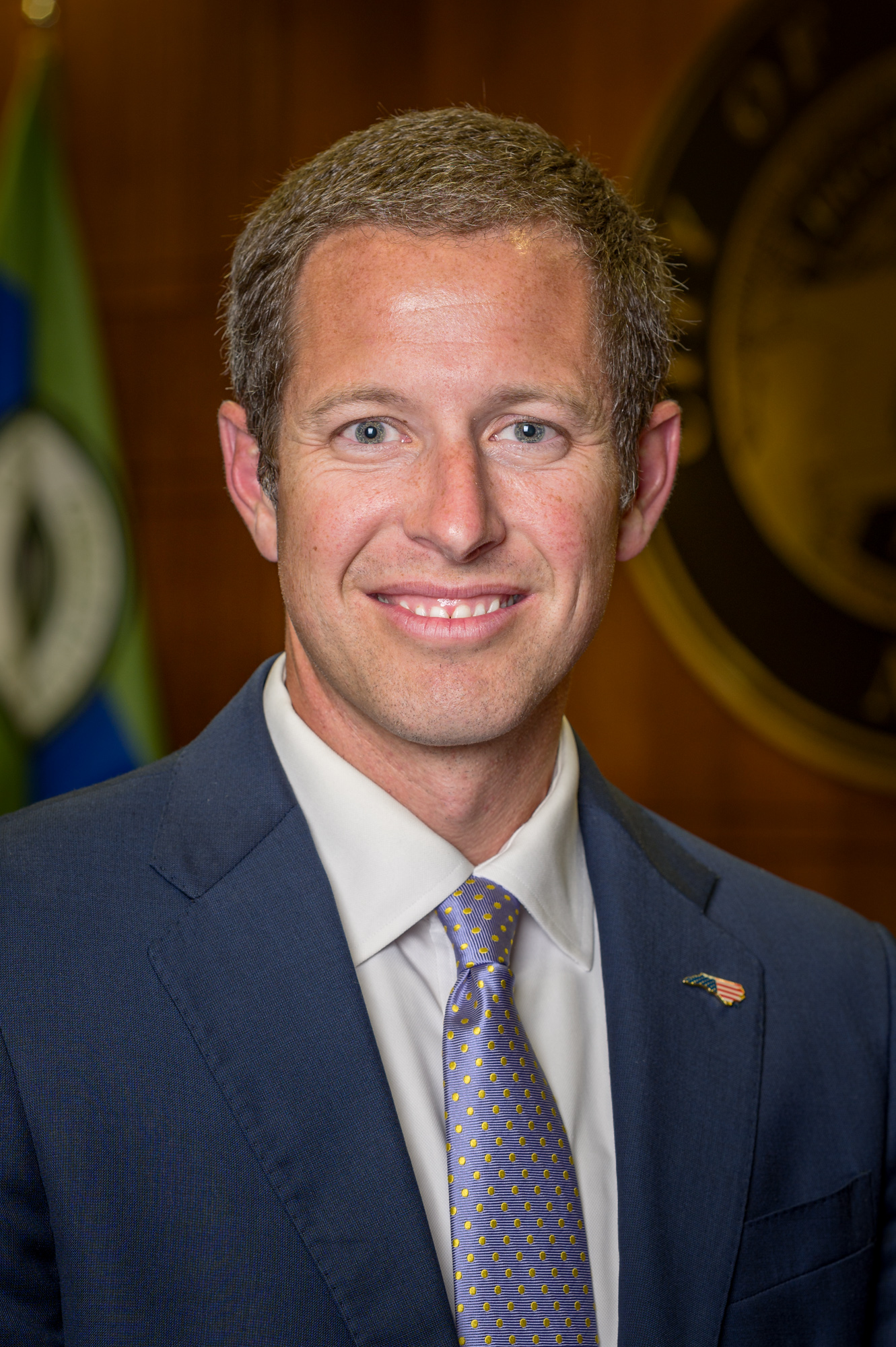
- Connelly in 2022

19th Mayor of Greenville
- Incumbent
- Assumed office November 7, 2017
- Preceded by: Kandie Smith

Personal details
- Born: Patrick James Connelly; June 27, 1983 (age 42) Beloit, Wisconsin, U.S.
- Party: Republican
- Education: East Carolina University
- Occupation: Politician
- Profession: Former Baseball player/Real Estate

Patrick James Connelly (born 1983) is an American politician and former baseball player. He is currently the mayor of Greenville, North Carolina.

== Early life and education ==
Connelly was born on June 27, 1983, in Beloit, Wisconsin. He graduated from Beloit Memorial High School. Connelly went to East Carolina University, where he majored in finance. He also played as a pitcher on the baseball team at the university. In 2004, he played collegiate summer baseball with the Falmouth Commodores of the Cape Cod Baseball League.

== Career ==
=== Baseball ===
After Connelly graduated from college, he played baseball professionally in the Los Angeles Angels organization for two years.

=== Politics ===
In 2015, Connelly was elected to Greenville's City Council for District 5. He ran for mayor in 2017, after Allen M. Thomas, the previous mayor, resigned. He won the election on November 7. The final vote count for him was 5,786, compared to 4,354 votes for Calvin Mercer, 529 for Ernest Reeves, and 37 for Curtis Pulley. He stated that his priorities for improvement as mayor would be safety, jobs, and roads.

== See also ==
- List of mayors of Greenville, North Carolina
