= Farmville, North Carolina =

- Town
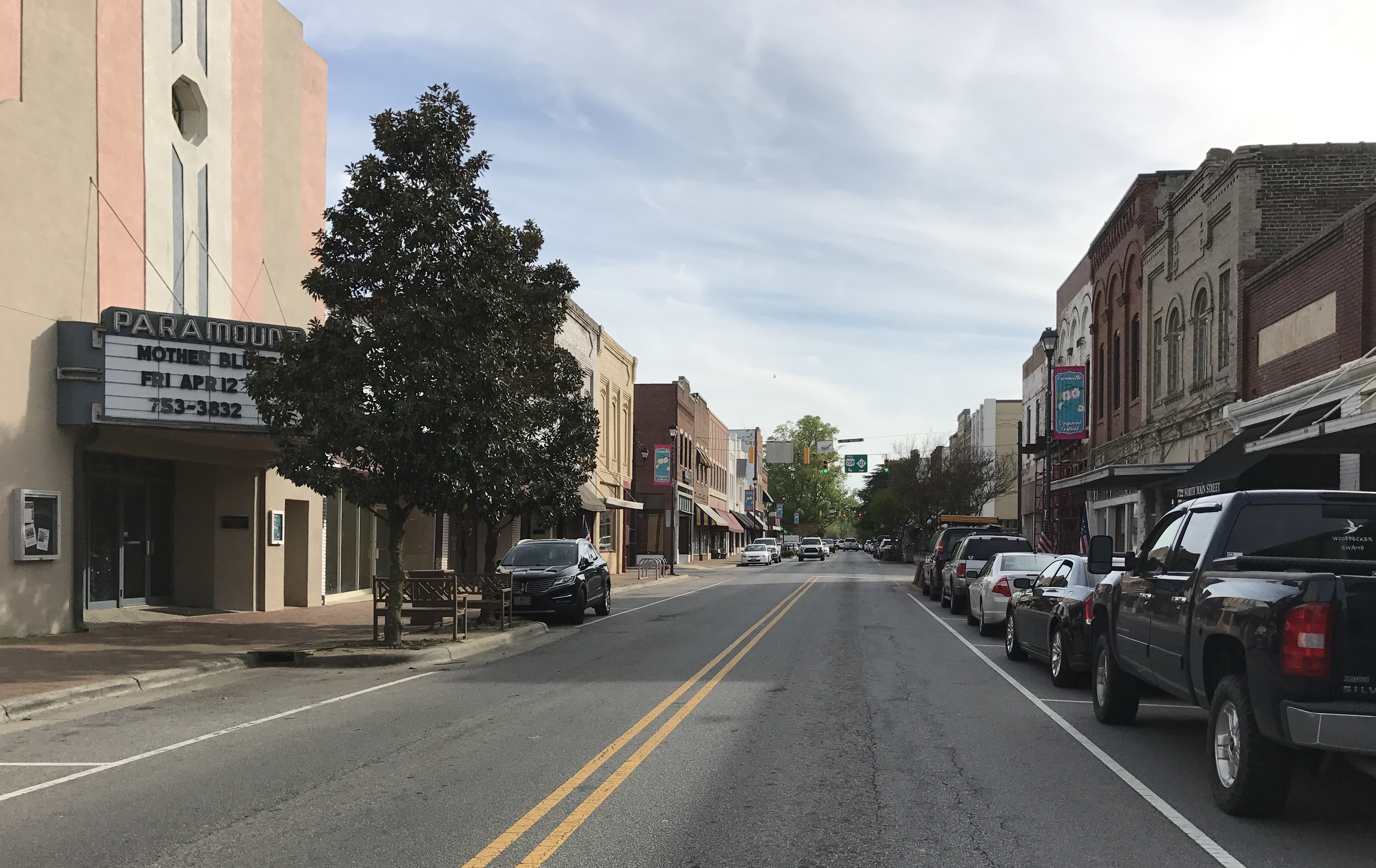
- Motto(s): "Honoring Our Past, Shaping Our Future"
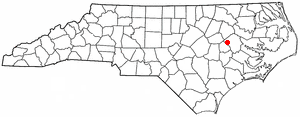
- Location of Farmville, North Carolina
- Coordinates: 35°35′42″N 77°35′26″W
- Country: United States
- State: North Carolina
- County: Pitt

Government
  - Type: Council-Manager
  - Mayor: Alex Joyner
  - Interim Town Manager: Andrew DeIonno

Area
  - Total: 3.20 sq mi (8.30 km^{2})
  - Land: 3.20 sq mi (8.30 km^{2})
  - Water: 0 sq mi (0.00 km^{2})
- Elevation: 82 ft (25 m)

Population (2020)
  - Total: 4,461
  - Density: 1,392.6/sq mi (537.67/km^{2})
- Time zone: UTC-5 (Eastern (EST))
  - Summer (DST): UTC-4 (EDT)
- ZIP code: 27828
- Area code: 252
- FIPS code: 37-22820
- GNIS feature ID: 2406493
- Website: https://www.farmvillenc.gov

Farmville is a town in Pitt County, North Carolina, United States, eight miles to the west of Greenville. At the 2020 census, the population was 4,461. Farmville is a part of the Greenville Metropolitan Area located in North Carolina's Inner Banks region. Farmville has been a Tree City USA community through the Arbor Day Foundation for 36 years, proving its commitment to managing and expanding its public trees. The Town government, in cooperation with other non-profit groups that work for the advancement of the town, sponsor annual events such as the Farmville Dogwood Festival, the Christmas Parade, Independence Day Celebration, A Taste of Farmville, the Holiday Open House, and as of September 2026, Farmville PorchFest.

== History ==
Established in February 1872, the town was named Farmville because all of its undertakings and activities were farm related. Among the influential founding fathers of Farmville, James Williams May and William Gray Lang made exceptional contributions to the towns development. Mr. James Williams May was a commissioner named in the original town charter. He donated sites for churches and was a business leader willing to invest his services and resources towards the success of the town. He was the grandson of Major Benjamin May. William Gray Lang served as a commissioner on the town board for more than 10 years. He also serviced on the executive committee appointed to establish the Tobacco Market in Farmville. The town grew slowly, with the 1880 census showing 111 in Farmville and 79 in Marlborough, a nearby unincorporated settlement along the wooden Historic Plank Road. The Marlborough settlement is now inside the town limits of Farmville. The cultivation of Tobacco in Pitt County and the Farmville area began in the 1890s, which helped bring the East Carolina Railway to Farmville in 1900. Most of buildings in downtown Farmville were built shortly after due to the economic boom the railroad helped begin. The Farmville Historic District and Benjamin May-Lewis House are listed on the National Register of Historic Places.

== Demographics ==
Historical population
Census	Pop.	Note	%±
1880	111		—
1890	140		26.1%
1900	262		87.1%
1910	816		211.5%
1920	1,780		118.1%
1930	2,056		15.5%
1940	2,980		44.9%
1950	2,942		−1.3%
1960	3,997		35.9%
1970	4,424		10.7%
1980	4,707		6.4%
1990	4,392		−6.7%
2000	4,302		−2.0%
2010	4,654		8.2%
2020	4,461		−4.1%
U.S. Decennial Census

=== Racial and ethnic composition ===
Farmville town, North Carolina – Racial and ethnic composition Note: the US Census treats Hispanic/Latino as an ethnic category. This table excludes Latinos from the racial categories and assigns them to a separate category. Hispanics/Latinos may be of any race.
Race / Ethnicity (NH = Non-Hispanic)	Pop 2000	Pop 2010	Pop 2020	% 2000	% 2010	% 2020
White alone (NH)	2,022	2,175	2,020	47.00%	46.73%	45.28%
Black or African American alone (NH)	2,148	2,299	2,106	49.93%	49.40%	47.21%
Native American or Alaska Native alone (NH)	3	7	16	0.07%	0.15%	0.36%
Asian alone (NH)	10	20	13	0.23%	0.43%	0.29%
Native Hawaiian or Pacific Islander alone (NH)	0	0	0	0.00%	0.00%	0.00%
Other race alone (NH)	3	5	12	0.07%	0.11%	0.27%
Mixed race or Multiracial (NH)	25	32	128	0.58%	0.69%	2.87%
Hispanic or Latino (any race)	91	116	166	2.12%	2.49%	3.72%
Total	4,302	4,654	4,461	100.00%	100.00%	100.00%

=== 2020 census ===
As of the 2020 census, Farmville had a population of 4,461. The median age was 43.6 years. 24.8% of residents were under the age of 18 and 22.8% of residents were 65 years of age or older. For every 100 females there were 80.0 males, and for every 100 females age 18 and over there were 74.6 males age 18 and over.

98.2% of residents lived in urban areas, while 1.8% lived in rural areas.

There were 1,918 households in Farmville, including 1,212 families, of which 30.3% had children under the age of 18 living in them. Of all households, 34.5% were married-couple households, 16.7% were households with a male householder and no spouse or partner present, and 44.9% were households with a female householder and no spouse or partner present. About 34.0% of all households were made up of individuals and 18.6% had someone living alone who was 65 years of age or older.

There were 2,237 housing units, of which 14.3% were vacant. The homeowner vacancy rate was 3.1% and the rental vacancy rate was 9.3%.

== Notable people ==
- Sam D. Bundy – Member, North Carolina General Assembly
- Joseph Dixon – United States Congressman (1870–1871)
- Roberta Flack – American singer, taught music in Farmville
- Blenda Gay – Former NFL player, murdered in 1976
- Walter B. Jones Sr. – United States Congressman (1967–1992)
- Walter B. Jones Jr. – United States Congressman (1993–2019)
- Elizabeth Schmoke Randolph (1917–2004), educator
- Terquavion Smith (born 2002) - college basketball player for the NC State Wolfpack
- Mike Sutton – Head Basketball Coach, Tennessee Technological University
- Allen H. Turnage – General, United States Marine Corps
- Edith D. Warren – Member, North Carolina General Assembly
