= Oakley, Pitt County, North Carolina =

Oakley
- Unincorporated community
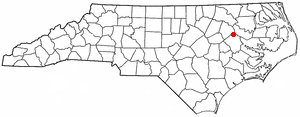
- Location of Oakley, North Carolina
- Coordinates: 35.757937°N 77.2866307°W
- Country: United States
- State: North Carolina
- County: Pitt
- Elevation: 62 ft (19 m)
- Time zone: UTC-5 (Eastern (EST))
  - Summer (DST): UTC-4 (EDT)
- ZIP code: 27884
- Area code: 252
- GNIS feature ID: 1000771

Oakley is an unincorporated community in Pitt County, North Carolina, United States.

== Geography ==
Oakley is located at latitude 35.757937 and longitude -77.2866307. The elevation is 62 feet.
