= Kandie Smith =

American politician

Senator Kandie Smith
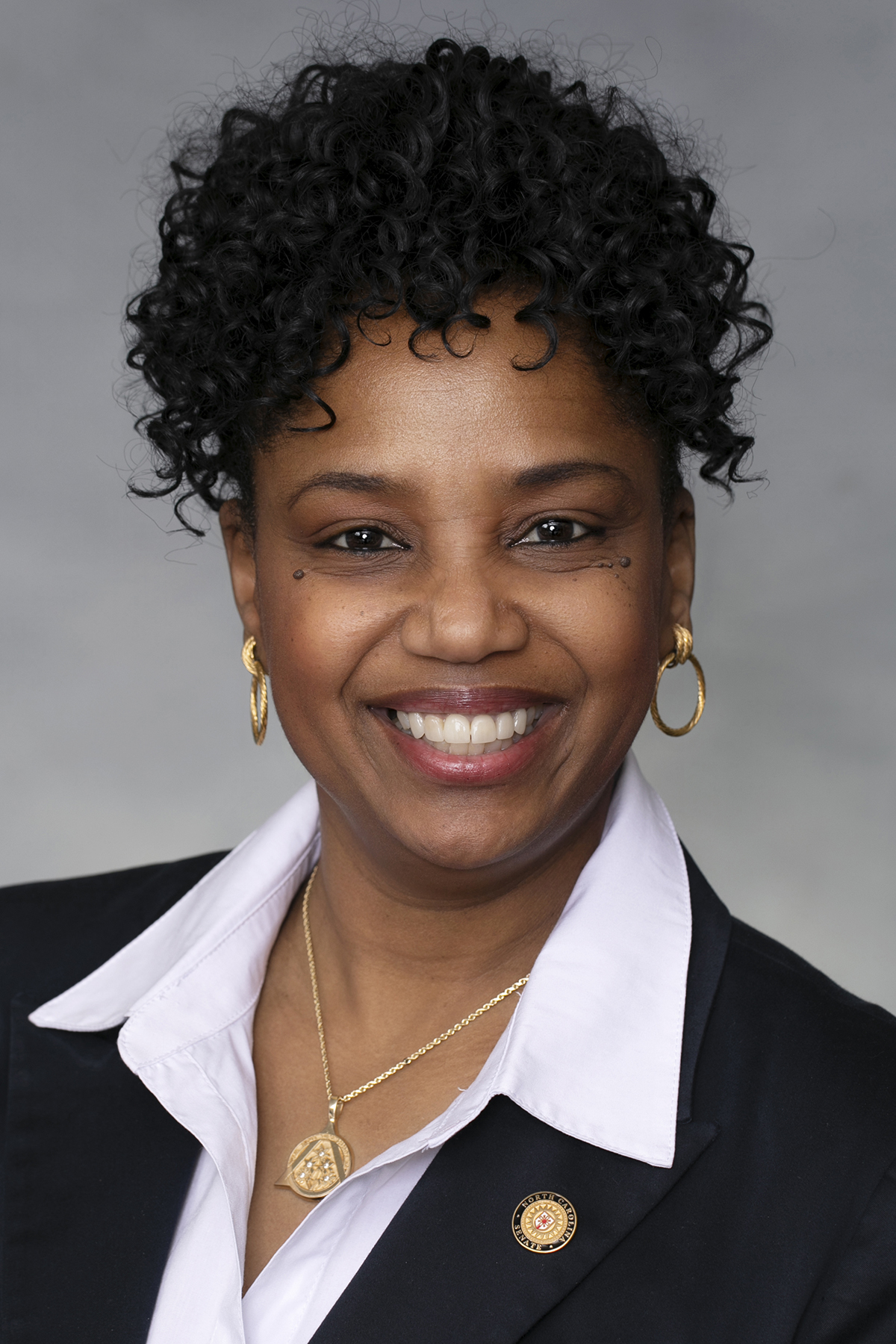

Member of the North Carolina Senate from the 5th district
- Incumbent
- Assumed office January 1, 2023
- Preceded by: Donald Davis

Member of the North Carolina House of Representatives from the 8th district
- In office January 1, 2019 – January 1, 2023
- Preceded by: Susan Martin
- Succeeded by: Gloristine Brown

18th Mayor of Greenville
- In office July 7, 2017 – December 12, 2017
- Preceded by: Allen Thomas
- Succeeded by: P.J. Connelly

Member of the Greenville City Council from the 1st district
- In office December 12, 2017 – December 13, 2018
- Preceded by: Shawan Barr
- Succeeded by: Monica Daniels
- In office December 7, 2009 – July 7, 2017
- Preceded by: Mildred Atkinson Council
- Succeeded by: Shawan Barr

Personal details
- Born: October 20, 1969 (age 56) Spartanburg, South Carolina, U.S.
- Party: Democratic
- Education: Charleston Southern University (BA)

Kandie Diane Smith (born October 20, 1969) is a Democratic member of the North Carolina Senate, representing the 5th district. She was previously a member of the North Carolina House of Representatives and interim mayor of Greenville, North Carolina.

== Education and early life ==
Smith obtained a bachelor's degree from Charleston Southern University where she majored in sociology and minored in communications.

== Greenville City Council ==
Before her election to mayor, Smith was on the Greenville City Council, representing District 1. When the former mayor, Allen Thomas, stepped down, Smith was elected mayor by the members of the council and held that office until the next election in November 2017, where she won re-election to the council, again serving District 1.

== North Carolina House of Representatives ==
In 2016, Smith attempted to defeat the incumbent state representative Jean Farmer-Butterfield for the Democratic nomination for North Carolina's 24th House district. Farmer-Butterfield defeated Smith.

In December 2017, after the incumbent, Susan Martin, announced that she would not run for re-election, Smith announced she would run for the 8th House district. Smith defeated the Pitt County Board of Education chair, Mildred Council, and the retired U.S. Army captain, Ernest Reeves, receiving 50% of the vote.

Smith went on to face the businesswoman, Brenda Letchworth Smith. Smith defeated Letchworth Smith, with 64.6% against 35.4%. On January 1, Smith was formally sworn in.

In the 2024 United States presidential election, she endorsed the Kamala Harris 2024 presidential campaign alongside the rest of the senate caucus.

=== Committee assignments ===
==== 2021-2022 session ====
- Agriculture
- Education - K-12
- Education - Universities
- Election Law and Campaign Finance Reform
- Finance
- Health

==== 2019-2020 session ====
- Agriculture
- Education - K-12
- Education - Universities
- Election Law and Campaign Finance Reform
- Finance
- Health

== Electoral history ==
=== 2009 ===
Greenville City Council 1st district general election, 2009
Candidate	Votes	%
Kandie Smith	509	50.25%
Mildred Atkinson Council (incumbent)	497	49.06%
Write-in	7	0.69%
Total votes	1,013	100%

=== 2011 ===
Greenville City Council 1st district general election, 2011
Candidate	Votes	%
Kandie Smith (incumbent)	963	92.24%
Write-in	45	4.31%
Rose Glover (write-in)	25	2.39%
Mildred Council (write-in	11	1.05%
Total votes	1,044	100%

=== 2013 ===
Greenville City Council 1st district general election, 2013
Candidate	Votes	%
Kandie Smith (incumbent)	1,000	69.59%
Clinton Ray Anderson Jr.	423	29.44%
Katherine Wetherington (write-in	10	0.70%
Write-in	4	0.28%
Total votes	1,437	100%

=== 2015 ===
Greenville City Council 1st district general election, 2015
Candidate	Votes	%
Kandie Smith (incumbent)	970	77.85%
Patrice Barrow	260	20.87%
Write-in	16	1.28%
Total votes	1,246	100%

=== 2016 ===
North Carolina House of Representatives 24th district Democratic primary election, 2016
Party	Candidate	Votes	%
Democratic	Jean Farmer-Butterfield (incumbent)	6,570	61.52%
Democratic	Kandie Smith	4,110	38.48%
Total votes		10,680	100%

=== 2017 ===
Greenville City Council 1st district general election, 2017
Candidate	Votes	%
Kandie Smith	984	82.55%
Micah Lockhart	195	16.36%
Write-in	13	1.09%
Total votes	1,192	100%

=== 2018 ===
North Carolina House of Representatives 8th district Democratic primary election, 2018
Party	Candidate	Votes	%
Democratic	Kandie Smith	2,791	50.04%
Democratic	Mildred Atkinson Council	1,988	35.64%
Democratic	Ernest T. Reeves	799	14.32%
Total votes		5,578	100%

North Carolina House of Representatives 8th district general election, 2018
Party	Candidate	Votes	%
Democratic	Kandie Smith	15,570	64.65%
Republican	Brenda Letchworth Smith	8,515	35.35%
Total votes		24,085	100%
Democratic gain from Republican			

=== 2020 ===
North Carolina House of Representatives 8th district general election, 2020
Party	Candidate	Votes	%
Democratic	Kandie Smith (incumbent)	23,739	60.21%
Republican	Tony Moore	15,685	39.79%
Total votes		39,424	100%
Democratic hold			

=== 2022 ===
North Carolina Senate 5th district Democratic primary election, 2022
Party	Candidate	Votes	%
Democratic	Kandie Smith	13,604	86.58%
Democratic	Lenton Brown	2,109	13.42%
Total votes		15,713	100%

North Carolina Senate 5th district general election, 2022
Party	Candidate	Votes	%
Democratic	Kandie Smith	36,557	52.23%
Republican	Karen Kozel	33,432	47.77%
Total votes		69,989	100%
Democratic hold			

== See also ==
- List of mayors of Greenville, North Carolina

North Carolina House of Representatives
Preceded by Susan Martin	Member of the North Carolina House of Representatives from the 8th district 2019–2023	Succeeded by Gloristine Brown
North Carolina Senate
Preceded by Donald Davis	Member of the North Carolina Senate from the 5th district 2023–Present	Incumbent
