= Pitt County, North Carolina =

County in North Carolina, United States

- County
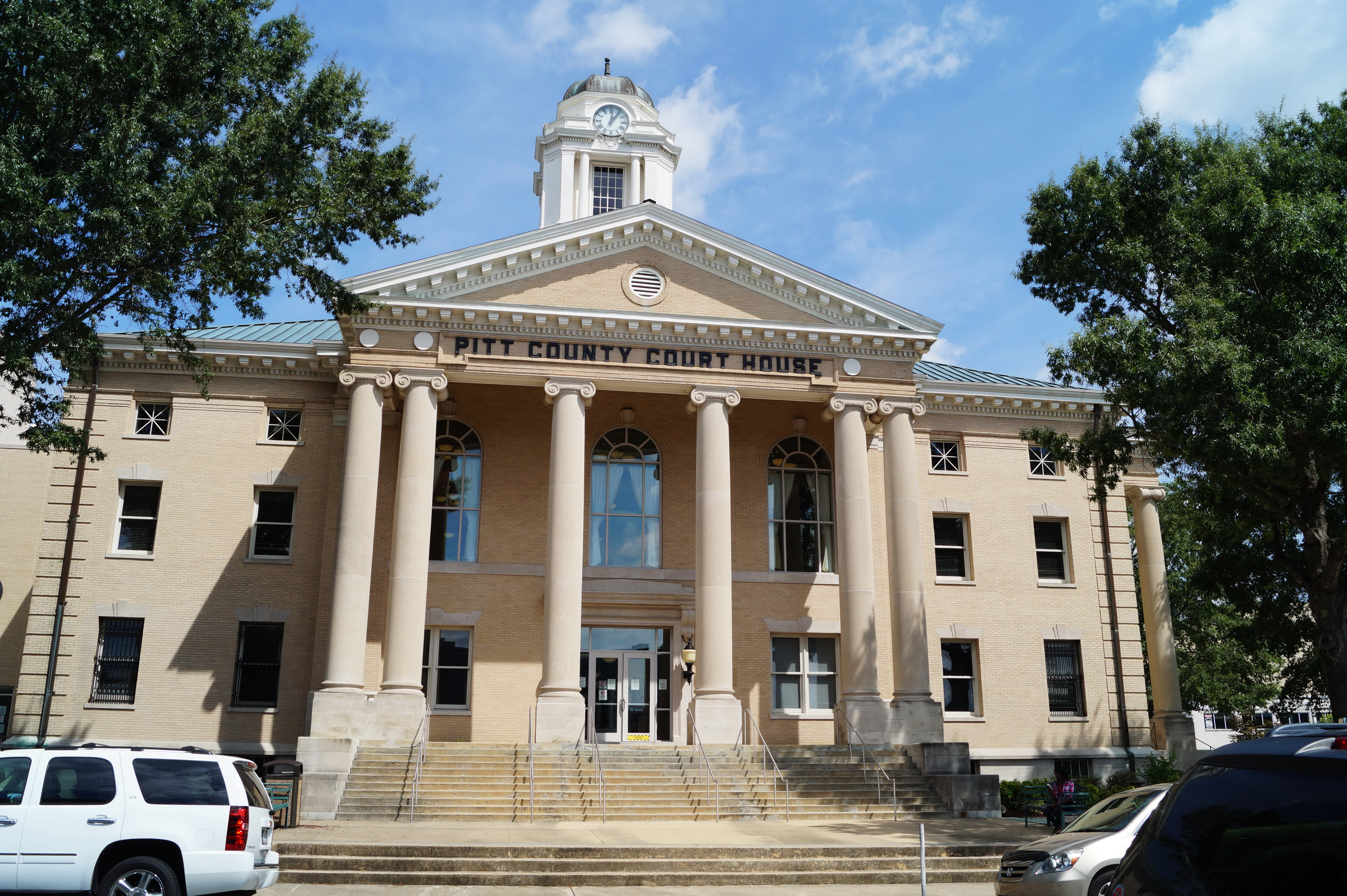
- Pitt County Courthouse in Greenville

- Flag Seal Logo

- Location within the U.S. state of North Carolina
- Coordinates: 35.59°N 77.37°W
- Country: United States
- State: North Carolina
- Founded: 1760
- Named for: William Pitt the Elder
- Seat: Greenville
- Largest community: Greenville

Area
  - Total: 655.55 sq mi (1,697.9 km^{2})
  - Land: 652.37 sq mi (1,689.6 km^{2})
  - Water: 3.18 sq mi (8.2 km^{2}) 0.49%

Population (2020)
  - Total: 170,243
  - Estimate (2025): 182,936 ▲
  - Density: 260.96/sq mi (100.76/km^{2})
- Time zone: UTC−5 (Eastern)
  - Summer (DST): UTC−4 (EDT)
- Congressional district: 3rd
- Website: www.pittcountync.gov

Pitt County is a county located in the Inner Banks region of the U.S. state of North Carolina. As of the 2020 census, the population was 170,243, making it the 14th-most populous county in North Carolina. Its county seat is Greenville.

Pitt County comprises the Greenville, NC Metropolitan Statistical Area. It is a component of the wider Greenville–Washington, NC CSA.

== History ==
The county was formed in 1760 from Beaufort County, though the legislative act that created it did not become effective until January 1, 1761. It was named for William Pitt the Elder, who was then Secretary of State for the Southern Department and Leader of the House of Commons. William Pitt was an English statesman and orator, born in London, England. He studied at Oxford University and in 1731 joined the army. Pitt led the young "Patriot" Whigs and in 1756 became secretary of state, where he was a pro-freedom speaker in British Colonial government. He served as Prime Minister of Great Britain in 1766–68.

The county saw a substantial population influx between the 1980 and 2010 censuses with a double-digit percentage increase seen in all four census counts.

== Geography ==
Interactive map of Pitt County

According to the U.S. Census Bureau, the total area of Pitt County is 655.55 square miles (1,697.9 km^{2}), of which 652.37 square miles (1,689.6 km^{2}) is land and 3.18 square miles (8.2 km^{2}) (0.49%) is water.

=== State and local protected sites ===
- North Carolina Museum of Natural Science Contentnea Creek
- North Carolina Museum of Natural Science Greenville

=== Major water bodies ===
- Contentnea Creek
- Creeping Swamp
- Fork Creek
- Middle River
- Neuse River
- Tar River
- Tranters Creek

=== Adjacent counties ===
- Martin County – northeast
- Beaufort County – east
- Craven County – south-southeast
- Lenoir County – south-southwest
- Greene County – southwest
- Wilson County – west
- Edgecombe County – northwest

=== Major highways ===
- I-587
- US 13
- US 64 Alt.
- US 258
- US 264
- US 264 Alt.
- NC 11
- NC 11 Bus.
- NC 11 Byp.
- NC 30
- NC 33
- NC 43
- NC 102
- NC 118
- NC 121
- NC 222
- NC 903

=== Major infrastructure ===
- G.K. Butterfield Transportation Center
- Pitt-Greenville Airport

== Demographics ==
Historical population
Census	Pop.	Note	%±
1790	8,270		—
1800	9,084		9.8%
1810	9,169		0.9%
1820	10,001		9.1%
1830	12,093		20.9%
1840	11,806		−2.4%
1850	13,397		13.5%
1860	16,080		20.0%
1870	17,276		7.4%
1880	21,794		26.2%
1890	25,519		17.1%
1900	30,889		21.0%
1910	36,340		17.6%
1920	45,569		25.4%
1930	54,466		19.5%
1940	61,244		12.4%
1950	63,789		4.2%
1960	69,942		9.6%
1970	73,900		5.7%
1980	90,146		22.0%
1990	107,924		19.7%
2000	133,798		24.0%
2010	168,148		25.7%
2020	170,243		1.2%
2025 (est.)	182,936	▲	7.5%
U.S. Decennial Census; 1790–1960 1900–1990; 1990–2000 2010 2020

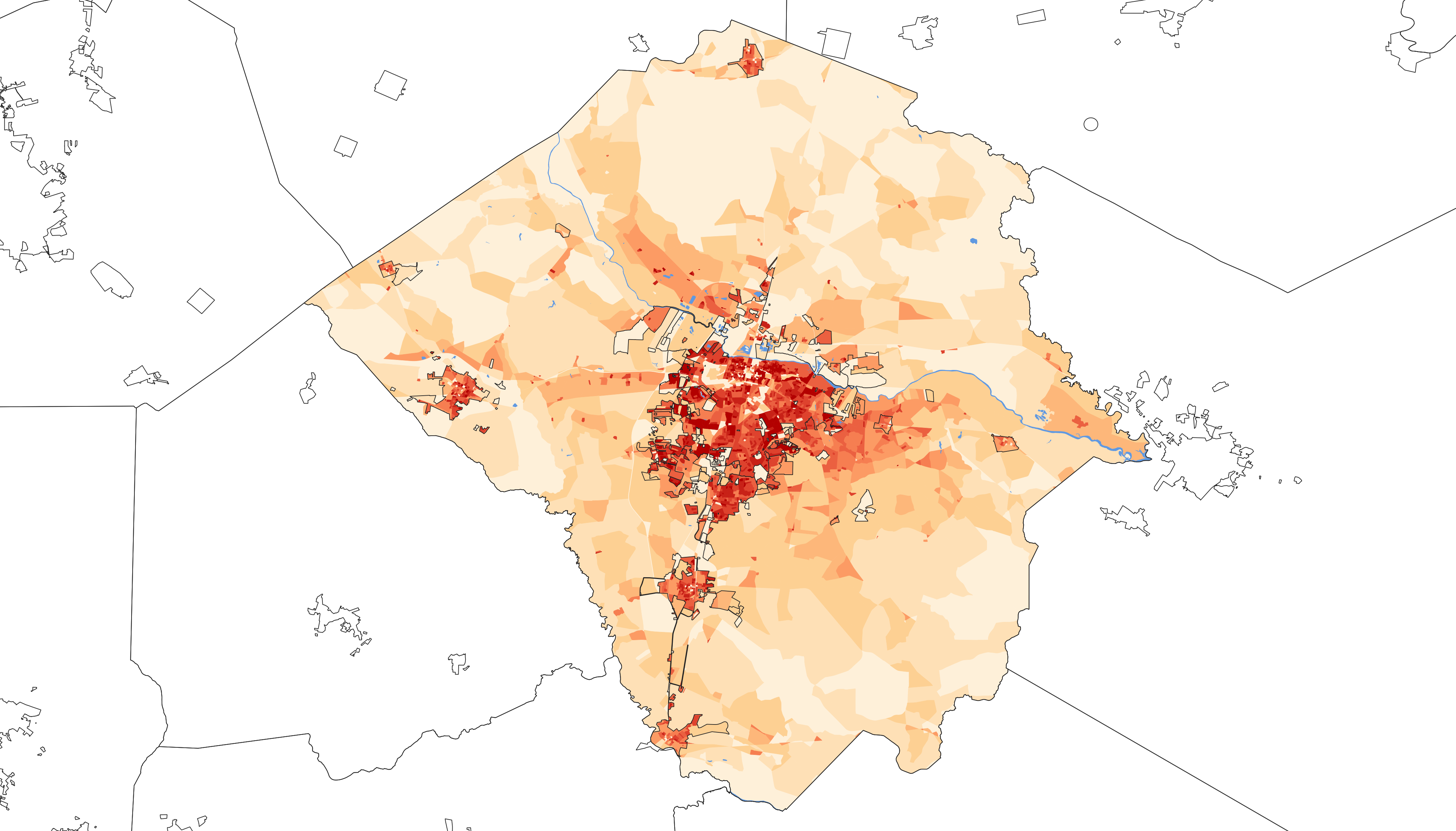
2020 population density of Pitt County NC by census block

=== Racial and ethnic composition ===
Pitt County, North Carolina – Racial and ethnic composition Note: the US Census treats Hispanic/Latino as an ethnic category. This table excludes Latinos from the racial categories and assigns them to a separate category. Hispanics/Latinos may be of any race.
Race / Ethnicity (NH = Non-Hispanic)	Pop 1980	Pop 1990	Pop 2000	Pop 2010	Pop 2020	% 1980	% 1990	% 2000	% 2010	% 2020
White alone (NH)	58,270	70,217	81,613	96,038	86,837	64.64%	65.06%	61.00%	57.12%	51.01%
Black or African American alone (NH)	30,502	35,813	44,819	56,813	59,813	33.84%	33.18%	33.50%	33.79%	35.13%
Native American or Alaska Native alone (NH)	90	201	330	474	494	0.10%	0.19%	0.25%	0.28%	0.29%
Asian alone (NH)	314	692	1,429	2,561	3,056	0.35%	0.64%	1.07%	1.52%	1.80%
Native Hawaiian or Pacific Islander alone (NH)	x	x	46	71	94	x	x	0.03%	0.04%	0.06%
Other race alone (NH)	119	24	179	290	752	0.13%	0.02%	0.13%	0.17%	0.44%
Mixed race or Multiracial (NH)	x	x	1,166	2,699	6,229	x	x	0.87%	1.61%	3.66%
Hispanic or Latino (any race)	851	977	4,216	9,202	12,968	0.94%	0.91%	3.15%	5.47%	7.62%
Total	90,146	107,924	133,798	168,148	170,243	100.00%	100.00%	100.00%	100.00%	100.00%

=== 2020 census ===
As of the 2020 census, there were 170,243 people, 70,016 households, and 41,427 families residing in the county. The median age was 35.0 years; 22.3% of residents were under the age of 18 and 14.5% of residents were 65 years of age or older. For every 100 females there were 88.7 males, and for every 100 females age 18 and over there were 84.6 males age 18 and over.

The racial makeup of the county was 52.2% White, 35.5% Black or African American, 0.4% American Indian and Alaska Native, 1.8% Asian, 0.1% Native Hawaiian and Pacific Islander, 4.6% from some other race, and 5.5% from two or more races. Hispanic or Latino residents of any race comprised 7.6% of the population.

73.1% of residents lived in urban areas, while 26.9% lived in rural areas.

There were 70,016 households in the county, of which 29.9% had children under the age of 18 living in them. Of all households, 38.3% were married-couple households, 19.5% were households with a male householder and no spouse or partner present, and 35.4% were households with a female householder and no spouse or partner present. About 31.7% of all households were made up of individuals and 9.8% had someone living alone who was 65 years of age or older.

There were 80,515 housing units, of which 13.0% were vacant. Among occupied housing units, 53.6% were owner-occupied and 46.4% were renter-occupied. The homeowner vacancy rate was 1.4% and the rental vacancy rate was 7.7%.

=== 2010 census ===
As of the census of 2010, there were 168,148 people residing in Pitt County, a 25.7% increase since 2000. Females made up 52.8% of the population. Caucasians make up 58.9% of the population, followed by African-Americans at 34.1%, Asian persons at 1.6%, American Indian or Alaskan at 0.3%, Hispanic at 5.5%, and Native Hawaiian or Other Pacific Islander at 0.1%.

=== 2005–2009 American Community Survey ===
From the period of 2005 to 2009, the number of foreign-born people living in the county was at 4%.

The high school graduation rate in the county among citizens over the age of twenty-five from 2005 to 2009 was steady at 85%, while the percentage of those aged twenty-five and up with a bachelor's degree in the county was only 28.7% in the county during the same period of time.

In 2009, the median household income in Pitt County was $36,339, over $7,000 less than the North Carolina number and about 25.5% of Pitt County residents were at or below the poverty level. The per capita money income, in terms of 2009 dollars, in the past twelve months from 2005 to 2009 in Pitt County was $21,622, about $3,000 less than the North Carolina average.

=== 2000 census ===
At the 2000 census, there were 133,798 people, 52,539 households, and 32,258 families residing in the county. The population density was 205 people per square mile (79 people/km^{2}). There were 58,408 housing units at an average density of 90 units per square mile (35 units/km^{2}). The racial makeup of the county was 62.08% White, 33.65% Black or African American, 0.27% Native American, 1.08% Asian, 0.04% Pacific Islander, 1.80% from other races, and 1.09% from two or more races. 3.15% of the population were Hispanic or Latino of any race.

There were 52,539 households, out of which 29.90% had children under the age of 18 living with them, 43.40% were married couples living together, 14.40% had a female householder with no husband present, and 38.60% were non-families. 28.30% of all households were made up of individuals, and 7.30% had someone living alone who was 65 years of age or older. The average household size was 2.43 and the average family size was 3.02.

In the county, the population was spread out, with 23.60% under the age of 18, 17.50% from 18 to 24, 29.90% from 25 to 44, 19.40% from 45 to 64, and 9.60% who were 65 years of age or older. The median age was 30 years. For every 100 females there were 90.20 males. For every 100 females age 18 and over, there were 86.40 males.

The median income for a household in the county was $32,868, and the median income for a family was $43,971. Males had a median income of $31,962 versus $25,290 for females. The per capita income for the county was $18,243. About 13.50% of families and 20.30% of the population were below the poverty line, including 21.60% of those under age 18 and 20.20% of those age 65 or over.

== Government and politics ==
In the early twentieth century Pitt was a typical Democratic "Solid South" county, where there were large numbers of disenfranchised blacks and the small white electorate voted overwhelming majorities for the Democratic Party. Pitt voted for the Democratic Party in every election from at least 1876 until American Independent candidate George Wallace gained a plurality in 1968. Apart from Richard Nixon's overwhelming victory over George McGovern in 1972, Pitt has since been a closely contested swing county, with no major party candidate post-McGovern falling under forty percent. After 1976, when Jimmy Carter carried it, and aside from a victory in 1992 by Bill Clinton, Pitt County tended to vote for Republicans until 2008. Since 2008 it has voted for the Democratic Party.

United States presidential election results for Pitt County, North Carolina
Year	Republican		Democratic		Third party(ies)	
Year	No.	%	No.	%	No.	%
1880	1,815	44.37%	2,200	53.78%	76	1.86%
1884	2,283	48.46%	2,428	51.54%	0	0.00%
1888	2,358	47.21%	2,569	51.43%	68	1.36%
1892	1,221	25.99%	2,052	43.68%	1,425	30.33%
1896	2,390	42.82%	3,181	56.99%	11	0.20%
1900	2,156	39.52%	3,264	59.82%	36	0.66%
1904	429	15.46%	2,329	83.93%	17	0.61%
1908	890	26.87%	2,419	73.04%	3	0.09%
1912	347	11.24%	2,303	74.63%	436	14.13%
1916	719	20.21%	2,839	79.79%	0	0.00%
1920	864	17.08%	4,196	82.92%	0	0.00%
1924	512	13.60%	3,197	84.91%	56	1.49%
1928	1,395	23.09%	4,646	76.91%	0	0.00%
1932	255	3.19%	7,724	96.55%	21	0.26%
1936	325	3.29%	9,539	96.71%	0	0.00%
1940	369	3.54%	10,067	96.46%	0	0.00%
1944	495	5.47%	8,556	94.53%	0	0.00%
1948	602	6.32%	8,519	89.47%	401	4.21%
1952	2,203	16.35%	11,271	83.65%	0	0.00%
1956	2,515	17.48%	11,873	82.52%	0	0.00%
1960	3,458	21.63%	12,526	78.37%	0	0.00%
1964	5,149	31.27%	11,317	68.73%	0	0.00%
1968	5,745	25.41%	7,696	34.04%	9,167	40.55%
1972	14,406	70.41%	5,858	28.63%	195	0.95%
1976	9,532	44.78%	11,636	54.66%	120	0.56%
1980	12,816	48.60%	12,590	47.74%	965	3.66%
1984	18,983	58.36%	13,481	41.45%	62	0.19%
1988	18,245	55.08%	14,777	44.61%	105	0.32%
1992	16,609	41.63%	17,959	45.02%	5,327	13.35%
1996	18,227	47.95%	17,555	46.18%	2,229	5.86%
2000	23,192	53.84%	19,685	45.70%	198	0.46%
2004	28,590	53.30%	24,924	46.46%	129	0.24%
2008	33,927	45.31%	40,501	54.08%	456	0.61%
2012	36,214	45.92%	41,843	53.06%	799	1.01%
2016	35,691	44.32%	41,824	51.94%	3,012	3.74%
2020	38,982	44.51%	47,252	53.96%	1,339	1.53%
2024	40,403	46.37%	45,595	52.33%	1,132	1.30%

Pitt County is a member of the Mid-East Commission regional council of governments.

Pitt County is represented by Kandie Smith in the 5th district of the North Carolina Senate, as well as Gloristine Brown in the 8th district and Timothy Reeder in the 9th district of the North Carolina House of Representatives.

== Education ==
=== Public ===
Public schools in Pitt County are managed by Pitt County Schools. The district includes the entire county.

==== Elementary schools ====
- Ayden Elementary School
- Belvoir Elementary School
- Creekside Elementary School
- Eastern Elementary School
- Elmhurst Elementary School
- Falkland Elementary School
- H. B. Sugg School (K–2)
- Lake Forest Elementary School
- Northwest Elementary School
- Ridgewood Elementary School
- Sam D. Bundy School (3–5)
- South Greenville Elementary School
- W. H. Robinson Elementary School
- Wahl-Coates Elementary School
- Wintergreen Intermediate School (3–5)
- Wintergreen Primary School (K–2)

==== K–8 schools ====
- Bethel School
- Chicod School
- G. R. Whitfield School
- Grifton School
- Pactolus School
- Stokes School

==== Middle schools ====
- A. G. Cox Middle School
- Ayden Middle School
- C. M. Eppes Middle School
- E. B. Aycock Middle School
- Farmville Middle School
- Hope Middle School
- Wellcome Middle School

==== High schools ====
- Ayden-Grifton High School
- D. H. Conley High School
- Farmville Central High School
- J. H. Rose High School
- North Pitt High School
- South Central High School

==== Alternative schools ====
- Pitt County Schools Early College High School

=== Private ===
Private schools in Pitt County include:

- Brookhaven SDA School
- Calvary Christian Academy
- Children's Montessori School
- Christ Covenant School
- Community Christian Academy
- Faith Christian Academy
- Greenville Christian Academy
- Greenville Montessori School
- John Paul II Catholic HS
- The Oakwood School
- Roseleaf Academy
- Saint Peter Catholic School
- Trinity Christian School

=== Post-secondary schools ===
- East Carolina University
- Pitt Community College
- Miller-Motte Technical College

== Communities ==
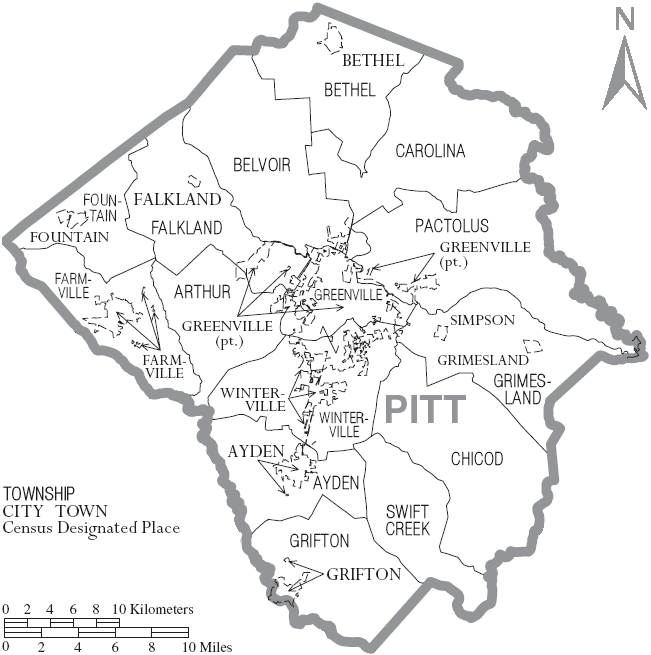
Map of Pitt County with municipal and township labels

=== Cities ===
- Greenville (county seat and largest community)

=== Towns ===
- Ayden
- Bethel
- Falkland
- Farmville
- Fountain
- Grifton (also in Lenoir County)
- Grimesland
- Simpson
- Winterville

=== Census-designated places ===
- Bell Arthur
- Belvoir
- Stokes

=== Unincorporated communities ===
- Bell's Fork
- Black Jack
- Chicod
- House
- Pactolus
- Oakley

=== Townships ===
- Arthur
- Ayden
- Belvoir
- Bethel
- Black Jack
- Carolina
- Chicod
- Falkland
- Farmville
- Fountain
- Greenville
- Grifton
- Grimesland
- Pactolus
- Simpson
- Swift Creek
- Winterville

== See also ==
- List of counties in North Carolina
- National Register of Historic Places listings in Pitt County, North Carolina
- Norfolk Southern Railway, Historic railway that had a route from Greenville to Raleigh, Wake County
