= Bethel, North Carolina =

- Town
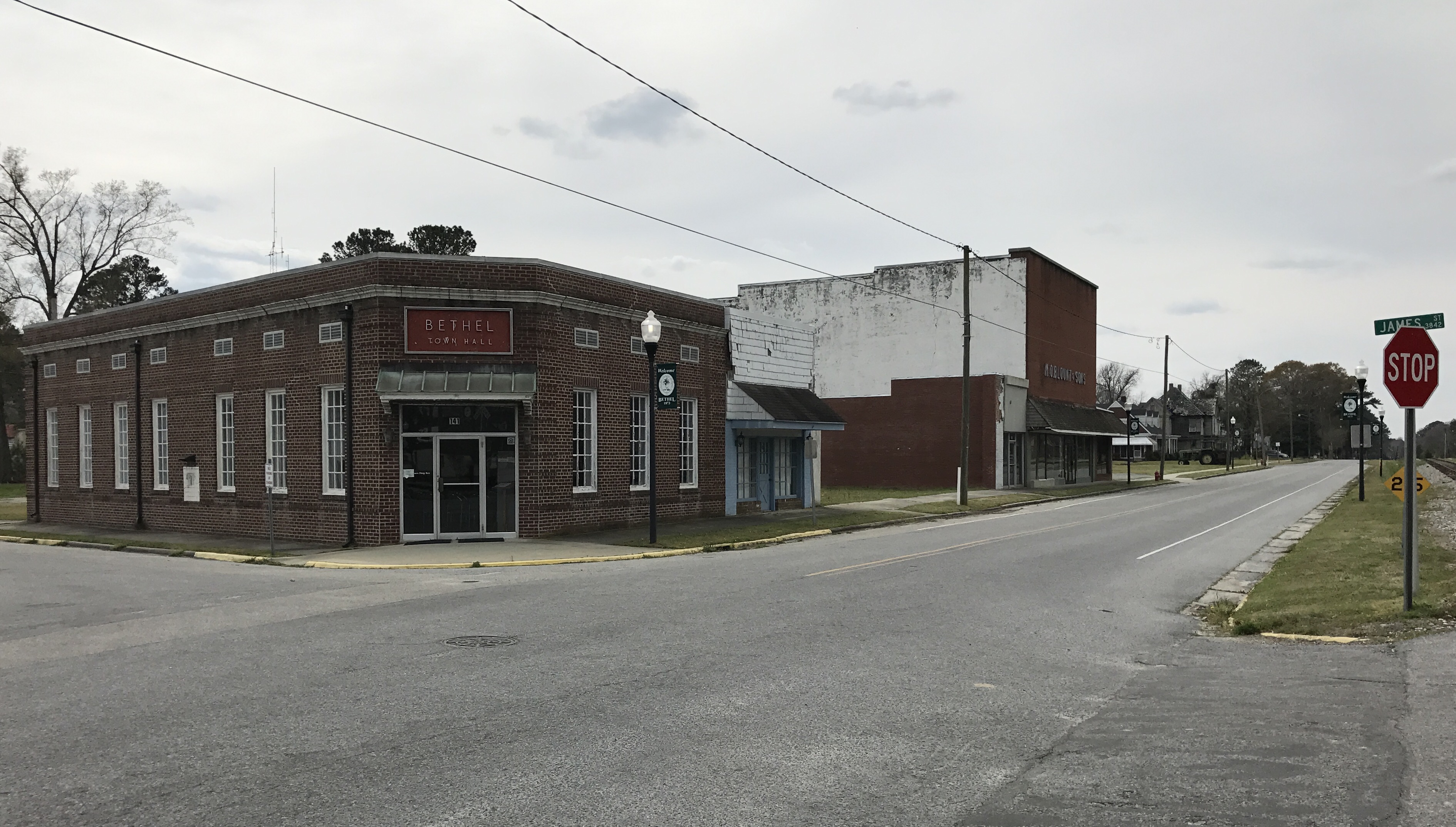
- Town hall

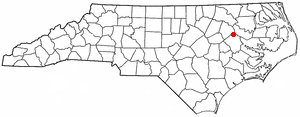
- Location of Bethel, North Carolina
- Coordinates: 35°48′26″N 77°22′35″W
- Country: United States
- State: North Carolina
- County: Pitt

Government
  - Mayor: Carl Wilson

Area
  - Total: 1.05 sq mi (2.73 km^{2})
  - Land: 1.05 sq mi (2.73 km^{2})
  - Water: 0 sq mi (0.00 km^{2})
- Elevation: 69 ft (21 m)

Population (2020)
  - Total: 1,373
  - Density: 1,304.7/sq mi (503.74/km^{2})
- Time zone: UTC-5 (Eastern (EST))
  - Summer (DST): UTC-4 (EDT)
- ZIP code: 27812
- Area code: 252
- FIPS code: 37-05460
- GNIS feature ID: 2405253
- Website: https://bethelnc.org/

Bethel is a town in Pitt County, North Carolina, United States. The population was 1,373 at the 2020 census. The town is a part of the Greenville Metropolitan Area located in North Carolina's Inner Banks region. Confusingly, there are three other towns in the state named "Bethel." One is between Edenton and Hertford in the "Finger Counties" region in the northeastern corner of the state, another is in the north-central part, in Caswell County and the third is located in the Mountain Region of North Carolina, in Haywood County. There is also a community named Bethel located in Watauga County.

== History ==
The area was settled before the American Civil War. The town of Bethel was incorporated in 1873, taking its name from Bethel Methodist Church.

== Geography ==
US 64, US 13, and NC 11 serves as the main routes through town. US 64 connects the town to Raleigh and the Inner Banks region. US 13 connects the town to Greenville, Fayetteville, and the cities in eastern Virginia. NC 11 connects the town to Greenville and Kinston.

According to the United States Census Bureau, the town has a total area of 1.0 square mile (2.6 km^{2}), all land.

== Demographics ==
Historical population
Census	Pop.	Note	%±
1880	127		—
1890	377		196.9%
1900	457		21.2%
1910	469		2.6%
1920	817		74.2%
1930	1,149		40.6%
1940	1,333		16.0%
1950	1,402		5.2%
1960	1,578		12.6%
1970	1,514		−4.1%
1980	1,825		20.5%
1990	1,842		0.9%
2000	1,681		−8.7%
2010	1,577		−6.2%
2020	1,373		−12.9%
U.S. Decennial Census

=== 2020 census ===
Bethel racial composition
Race	Number	Percentage
White (non-Hispanic)	496	36.13%
Black or African American (non-Hispanic)	752	54.77%
Native American	10	0.73%
Asian	1	0.07%
Pacific Islander	2	0.15%
Other/Mixed	38	2.77%
Hispanic or Latino	74	5.39%

As of the 2020 United States census, there were 1,373 people, 754 households, and 433 families residing in the town.

=== 2000 census ===
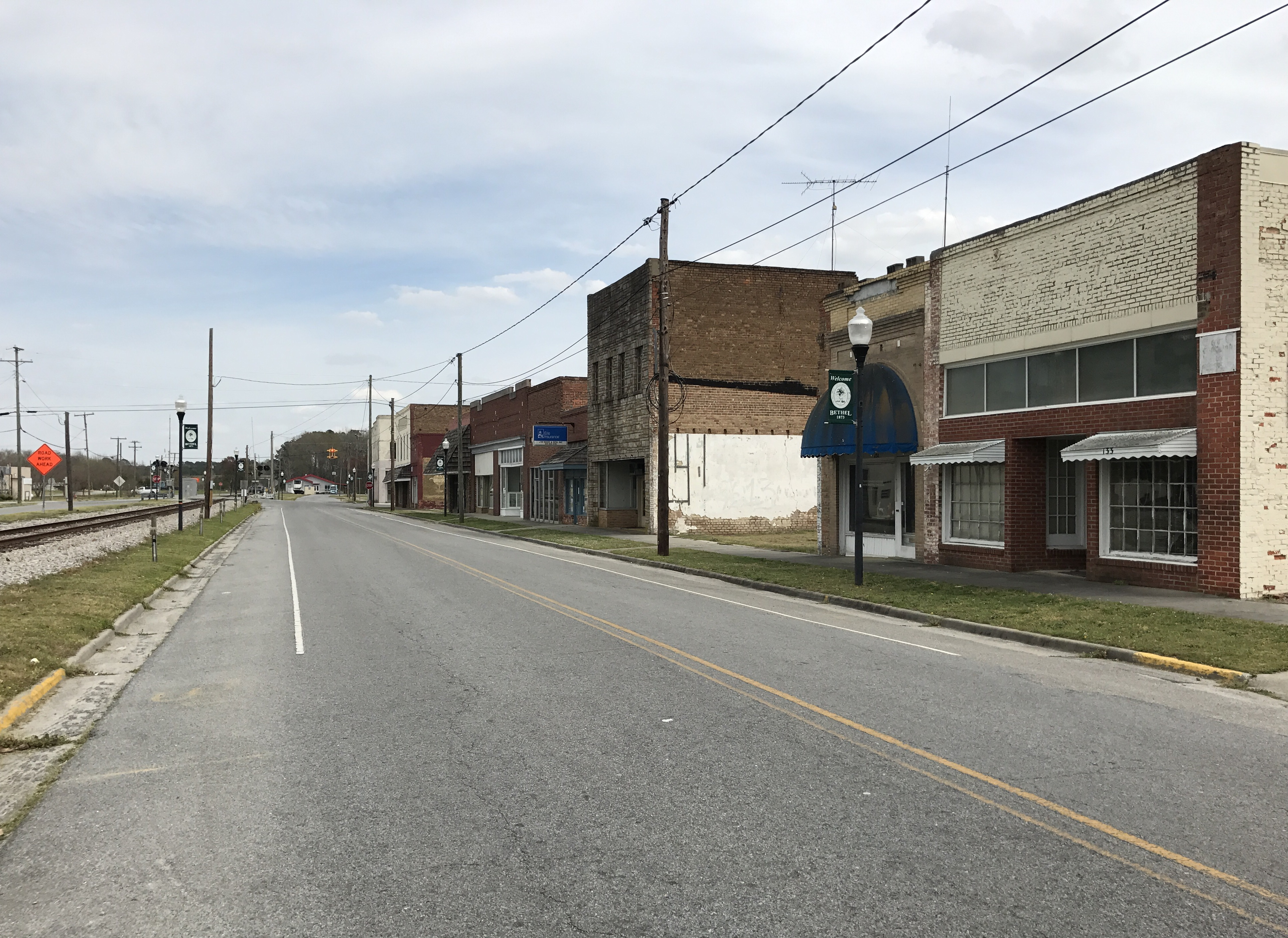
West Railroad Street

As of the census of 2000, there were 1,681 people, 651 households, and 449 families residing in the town. The population density was 1,606.8 inhabitants per square mile (620.4/km^{2}). There were 710 housing units at an average density of 678.6 per square mile (262.0/km^{2}). The racial makeup of the town was 40.15% White, 58.12% African American, 0.18% Native American, 0.12% Pacific Islander, 0.71% from other races, and 0.71% from two or more races. Hispanic or Latino of any race were 0.77% of the population.

There were 651 households, out of which 28.6% had children under the age of 18 living with them, 43.9% were married couples living together, 22.0% had a female householder with no husband present, and 30.9% were non-families. 28.9% of all households were made up of individuals, and 16.1% had someone living alone who was 65 years of age or older. The average household size was 2.57 and the average family size was 3.15.

In the town, the population was spread out, with 26.1% under the age of 18, 7.9% from 18 to 24, 23.1% from 25 to 44, 24.4% from 45 to 64, and 18.4% who were 65 years of age or older. The median age was 40 years. For every 100 females, there were 79.0 males. For every 100 females age 18 and over, there were 71.3 males.

The median income for a household in the town was $25,326, and the median income for a family was $35,278. Males had a median income of $25,982 versus $20,313 for females. The per capita income for the town was $15,219. About 18.5% of families and 22.4% of the population were below the poverty line, including 25.7% of those under age 18 and 24.4% of those age 65 or over.

== Education ==
Pitt County Schools:

- North Pitt High School
- Bethel Elementary School

== Notable people ==
- Greg Briley (born 1965), former MLB outfielder
- Almyra Maynard Watson (1917–2018), officer in the United States Army Nurse Corps
- Warren Griffin Wilson (1934–2024), American broadcast, radio, and wire service journalist
