= National Register of Historic Places listings in Hertford County, North Carolina =

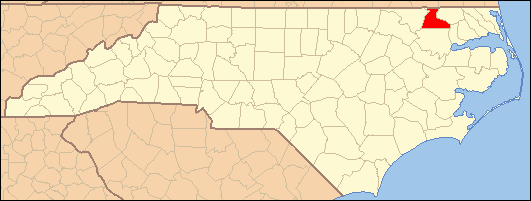

This list includes properties and districts listed on the National Register of Historic Places in Hertford County, North Carolina, United States. Click the "Map of all coordinates" link to the right to view an online map of all properties and districts with latitude and longitude coordinates in the table below.

== Current listings ==
This National Park Service list is complete through NPS recent listings posted March 14, 2025.

| | Name on the Register | Image | Date listed | Location | City or town | Description |
|---|---|---|---|---|---|---|
| 1 | Ahoskie Downtown Historic District | Ahoskie Downtown Historic District | April 25, 1985 (#85000906) | Roughly bounded by W. North St., Seaboard Coastline RR, W. Main St., S. and N. Mitchell Sts. 36°17′10″N 76°59′13″W | Ahoskie | |
| 2 | Ahoskie Historic District | Ahoskie Historic District | April 24, 2012 (#12000237) | Roughly bounded by Pembroke Ave., Catherine Creek Rd., Colony, Alton, Maple, & South Sts. 36°17′14″N 76°59′05″W | Ahoskie | |
| 3 | Ahoskie School | Ahoskie School | September 7, 2005 (#05000960) | 105 N. Academy St. 36°17′20″N 76°59′28″W | Ahoskie | |
| 4 | David A. Barnes House | David A. Barnes House | June 13, 2014 (#14000333) | 625 W. Main St. 36°26′30″N 77°06′37″W | Murfreesboro | |
| 5 | Bethlehem Baptist Church | | July 29, 1985 (#100003298) | 1024 NC 561 E 36°18′09″N 77°04′48″W | Bethlehem vicinity | |
| 6 | C. S. Brown School Auditorium | | July 29, 1985 (#85001657) | Off NC 45; 36°23′06″N 76°56′18″W | Winton | |
| 7 | Wiley and Jane Vann Brown House | | February 13, 2007 (#07000073) | NC 1108, 0.5 miles (0.80 km) north of NC 561; 36°18′52″N 77°01′38″W | Union | |
| 8 | The Cedars | | September 22, 1983 (#83001890) | Southeast of Murfreesboro off SR 1167; 36°23′38″N 77°04′10″W | Murfreesboro | |
| 9 | The Columns | The Columns | February 18, 1971 (#71000590) | Jones Dr. 36°26′33″N 77°05′59″W | Murfreesboro | |
| 10 | Cowper-Thompson House | | January 9, 1992 (#91001908) | 405 North St. 36°26′43″N 77°05′49″W | Murfreesboro | |
| 11 | Deane House | Deane House | April 15, 1982 (#82003468) | Off SR 1446; 36°19′58″N 76°52′09″W | Cofield | |
| 12 | East End Historic District | | January 31, 2008 (#07001497) | Bounded by Maple St., Town boundary, Catherine Creek Rd. & Holloman Ave. 36°17′37″N 76°58′26″W | Ahoskie | |
| 13 | Freeman House | Freeman House | February 18, 1971 (#71000591) | 200 E. Broad St. 36°26′39″N 77°05′59″W | Murfreesboro | |
| 14 | Gray Gables | Gray Gables | June 1, 1982 (#82003470) | Main St. 36°23′26″N 76°55′59″W | Winton | |
| 15 | Hare Plantation House | | February 18, 1971 (#71000588) | 1.6 miles (2.6 km) west of the junction of SR 1317 and US 258; 36°30′21″N 77°02′22″W | Como | |
| 16 | Harrellsville Historic District | Harrellsville Historic District | November 29, 1995 (#95001398) | Roughly, E. and W. Main St., Quebec St. and Tar Landing Rd. 36°18′05″N 76°47′31″W | Harrellsville | |
| 17 | Roberts H. Jernigan House | Roberts H. Jernigan House | February 16, 2001 (#01000123) | 209 S. Catherine Creek Rd. 36°16′51″N 76°58′45″W | Ahoskie | |
| 18 | King-Casper-Ward-Bazemore House | | November 26, 1982 (#82001299) | West of Ahoskie on NC 11; 36°16′37″N 77°03′02″W | Ahoskie | |
| 19 | Melrose | Melrose | March 31, 1971 (#71000592) | 100 E. Broad St. 36°26′39″N 77°06′01″W | Murfreesboro | |
| 20 | Mill Neck School | | January 5, 2016 (#15000957) | 123 Mill Neck Rd. 36°30′46″N 76°59′05″W | Como | |
| 21 | William Mitchell House | | December 4, 1972 (#72000965) | 3 miles (4.8 km) east of Ahoskie on NC 350; 36°16′50″N 77°02′52″W | Ahoskie | |
| 22 | Mulberry Grove | | November 25, 1980 (#80002848) | Southwest of Ahoskie; 36°17′32″N 77°09′01″W | Ahoskie | |
| 23 | Murfreesboro Historic District | Murfreesboro Historic District | August 26, 1971 (#71000593) | Roughly bounded by Broad, 4th, Vance, and Winder Sts. 36°26′34″N 77°06′03″W | Murfreesboro | |
| 24 | Myrick House | Myrick House | March 31, 1971 (#71000594) | 402 Broad St. 36°26′38″N 77°05′55″W | Murfreesboro | |
| 25 | Myrick-Yeates-Vaughan House | Myrick-Yeates-Vaughan House | March 17, 1983 (#83001891) | 327 W. Main St. 36°26′32″N 77°06′20″W | Murfreesboro | |
| 26 | James Newsome House | | December 28, 1984 (#84000803) | NC 11 at jct. NC 42; 36°16′44″N 77°03′22″W | Ahoskie | |
| 27 | King Parker House | | December 31, 2002 (#02001663) | 304 Mount Moriah Rd. 36°23′50″N 76°59′32″W | Winton | |
| 28 | Pleasant Plains School | | May 17, 2016 (#16000288) | US 13 S. of jct. with Pleasant Plains Rd. 36°21′13″N 76°58′47″W | Pleasant Plains | |
| 29 | William Rea Store | William Rea Store | September 15, 1970 (#70000457) | E. Williams St. 36°26′38″N 77°05′54″W | Murfreesboro | |
| 30 | Riddick House | | February 18, 1971 (#71000589) | 1 mile (1.6 km) south of the junction of SR 1319 and 1322; 36°31′46″N 76°56′25″W | Como | |
| 31 | Roberts-Vaughan House | Roberts-Vaughan House | February 18, 1971 (#71000595) | 130 E. Main St. 36°26′33″N 77°06′01″W | Murfreesboro | |
| 32 | Dr. Roscius P. and Mary Mitchell Thomas House and Outbuildings | | August 28, 2007 (#07000884) | 734 Thomas Bridge Rd. 36°18′33″N 76°53′23″W | Bethlehem | |
| 33 | Vernon Place | | April 29, 1982 (#82003469) | North of Como off US 258; 36°30′15″N 76°59′59″W | Como | |
| 34 | John Wheeler House | John Wheeler House | March 31, 1971 (#71000596) | 403 E. Broad St. 36°26′39″N 77°05′54″W | Murfreesboro | |
| 35 | Winton Historic District | | December 21, 2020 (#100005976) | Roughly bounded by west side of North King St., north of Cross St., North Murfree, East Weaver, and West Jordan Sts. 36°23′27″N 76°56′10″W | Winton | |

== See also ==
- National Register of Historic Places listings in North Carolina
- List of National Historic Landmarks in North Carolina
