= Murfreesboro Historic District =

Historic district in North Carolina, United States

- U.S. National Register of Historic Places
- U.S. Historic district
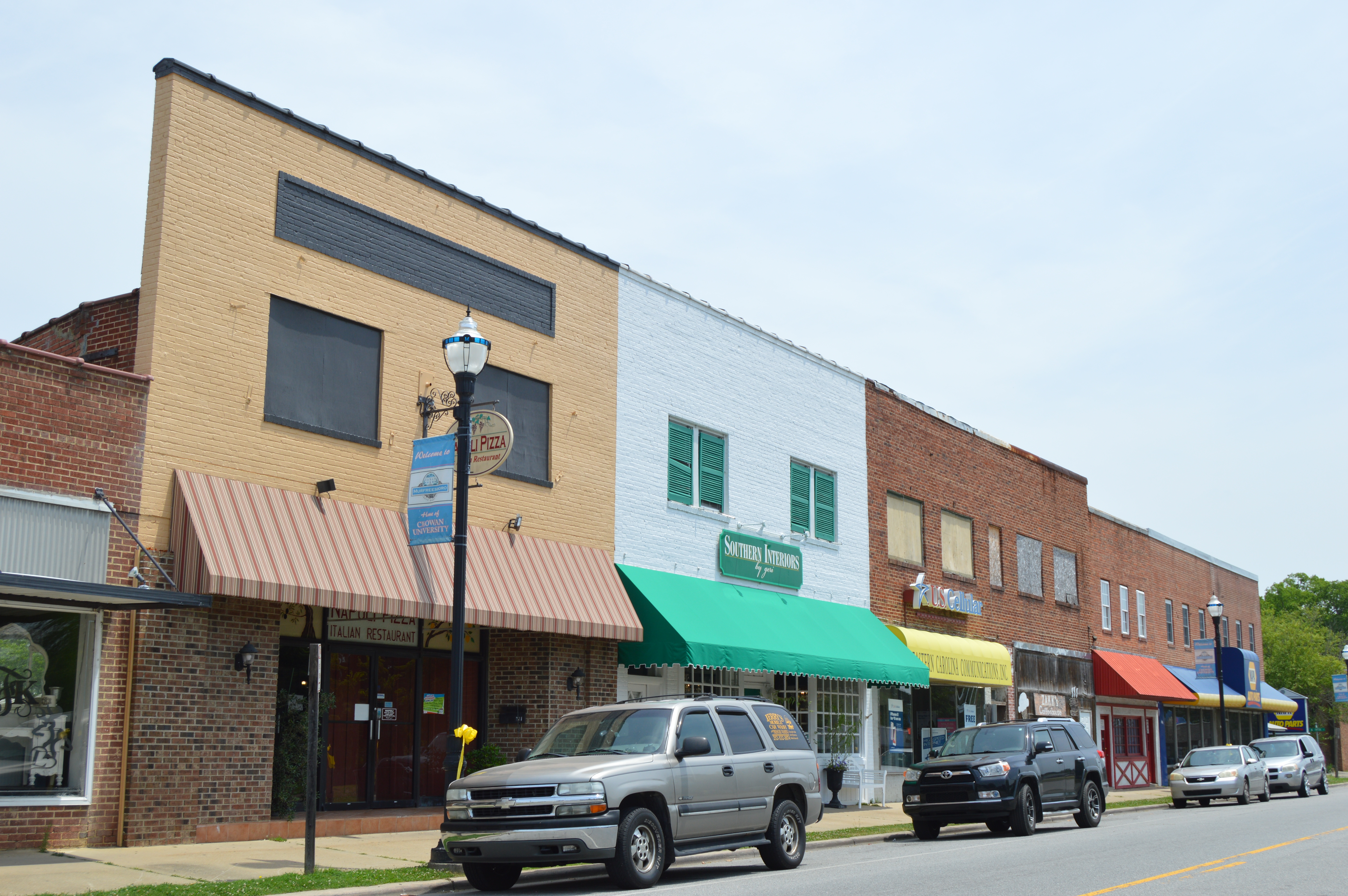
- Main Street commercial district

- Location within North Carolina Location within the United States
- Location: Roughly bounded by Broad, 4th, Vance, and Winder Sts., Murfreesboro, North Carolina
- Coordinates: 36°26′34″N 76°06′03″W
- Area: 100 acres (40 ha)
- Architectural style: Greek Revival
- NRHP reference No.: 71000593
- Added to NRHP: August 26, 1971

Murfreesboro Historic District is a national historic district located at Murfreesboro, Hertford County, North Carolina. The district encompasses nine contributing buildings in the oldest section of the city of Murfreesboro. The buildings include notable examples of Greek Revival style architecture. They are the William Rea Store (c. 1790); John Wheeler House (c. 1800) birthplace of John H. Wheeler (1806-1882) and later home of Congressman Jesse Johnson Yeates (1829-1892); Myrick House (c. 1810); Melrose (c. 1810) home of Congressman William H. Murfree (1781 – 1827); The Hertford Academy (c. 1810); Roberts-Vaughan House (c. 1810); Dr. Isaac Pipkin House (c. 1825); Rose Bower (c. 1830); and the Walter Reed House (c. 1845) childhood home of Walter Reed.

It was listed on the National Register of Historic Places in 1971.
