= Francis Parker House =

Historic house in North Carolina, United States

- U.S. National Register of Historic Places
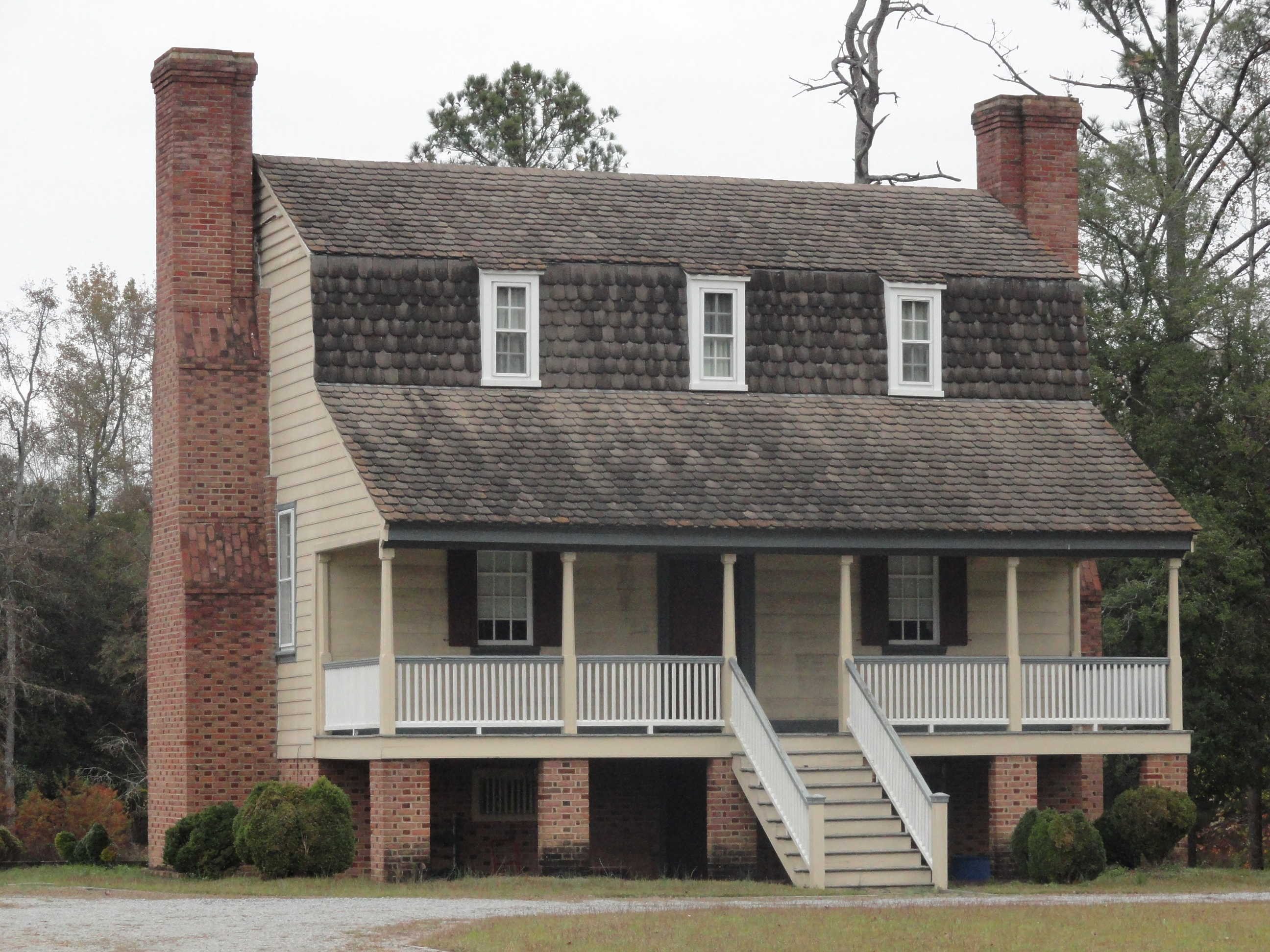

- Location within North Carolina Location within the United States
- Nearest city: Murfreesboro, North Carolina
- Coordinates: 36°26′18″N 77°8′55″W
- Area: 1 acre (0.40 ha)
- Built: c. 1785
- Architectural style: Georgian
- NRHP reference No.: 83001900
- Added to NRHP: October 21, 1983

Francis Parker House, also known as Parker's Big Run or High House, is a historic home located near Murfreesboro, North Carolina and Northampton County, North Carolina. It was built about 1785, and is a 1 1/2-story, hall and parlor plan, Georgian style frame dwelling with a one-story rear wing. It has a gambrel roof, is sheathed in weatherboard, sits on a raised brick basement, and rebuilt massive paved double-shoulder exterior end chimneys. The house was moves to its present location in 1976. The contributing Vaughan house and pyramidal-roof frame dairy (formerly located in Hertford County near the Parker house), were also moved to the site.

It was listed on the National Register of Historic Places in 1983.
