= The Columns =

The Columns may refer to:

- The Columns (Columbia, Missouri), a contributing structure on the National Register of Historic Places and symbol of the University of Missouri
- The Columns (Tallahassee, Florida), listed on the National Register of Historic Places in Leon County, Florida
- The Columns (Murfreesboro, North Carolina), listed on the National Register of Historic Places in Hertford County, North Carolina
- Engineers' Club Building, once known as "The Columns", listed on the National Register of Historic Places in New York County, New York
- The news platform of Washington and Lee University

== See also ==
- The Column, a 1968 Romanian historical film
