= Menola, North Carolina =

- Unincorporated community
- Location within North Carolina Location within the United States
- Coordinates: 36°20′21″N 77°07′44″W
- Country: United States
- State: North Carolina
- County: Hertford
- Elevation: 59 ft (18 m)
- Time zone: UTC-5 (Eastern (EST))
  - Summer (DST): UTC-4 (EDT)
- Area code: 252
- GNIS feature ID: 1021411

Menola is an unincorporated community in Hertford County, North Carolina, United States. The community is located on state secondary highways, 7.3 miles (11.7 km) south-southwest of Murfreesboro.
