= William H. Murfree =

American politician

Member of the U.S. House of Representatives from North Carolina's 1st district
- In office March 4, 1813 – March 3, 1817
- Preceded by: Lemuel Sawyer
- Succeeded by: Lemuel Sawyer

Member of the North Carolina General Assembly
- In office 1805; 1812

Personal details
- Born: October 2, 1781 Hertford County, North Carolina
- Died: January 19, 1827 (aged 45)
- Party: Democratic-Republican
- Relations: David W. Dickinson (nephew)
- Education: University of North Carolina at Chapel Hill

William Hardy Murfree (October 2, 1781 – January 19, 1827), born in Hertford County, North Carolina, was a member of the United States House of Representatives from North Carolina.

== Education ==
He graduated in 1801 from the University of North Carolina at Chapel Hill where he studied law. He was admitted to the bar and practiced in Edenton, North Carolina.

== Career ==
Murfee became a member of the North Carolina General Assembly in 1805 and 1812 and was elected as a Republican to the Thirteenth and Fourteenth Congresses where he served from March 4, 1813, to March 3, 1817. He served as Chairman of the Committee on Public Expenditures in the Fourteenth Congress.

In 1823, he moved from Murfreesboro, North Carolina, to his estate in Williamson County, Tennessee where he died on January 19, 1827. He was buried in Murfree Cemetery, northwest of Franklin, Tennessee. His home at Murfreesboro, North Carolina, Melrose, was listed on the National Register of Historic Places in 1971.

His nephew, David W. Dickinson, also served as a U.S. representative, but in Tennessee.

== Sources ==
- United States Congress. "William H. Murfree (id: M001084)". Biographical Directory of the United States Congress.

== See also ==
- Thirteenth United States Congress
- Fourteenth United States Congress

U.S. House of Representatives
Preceded by Lemuel Sawyer	Member of the U.S. House of Representatives from North Carolina's 1st congressional district 1813–1817	Succeeded by Lemuel Sawyer
