= Princeton Site =

- U.S. National Register of Historic Places
- Nearest city: Murfreesboro, North Carolina
- Area: 60 acres (24 ha)
- Built: 1787
- NRHP reference No.: 80004281
- Added to NRHP: November 25, 1980

The Princeton Site, designated by the Smithsonian trinomial 31NHP93, is a historic archaeological site near Murfreesboro, North Carolina. The site encompasses the former town of "Prince Town" or "Princeton", a riverfront community settled by European Americans as early as the 1740s and incorporated in 1787. The town died out by 1810, probably due to poor economic conditions brought about by the silting of its harbor and reduced trade because of the Napoleonic Wars in Europe. Excavation took place at the site in 1984.

The site was listed on the National Register of Historic Places in 1980.

== See also ==
- National Register of Historic Places listings in Hertford County, North Carolina
