= Jesse Johnson Yeates =

American politician

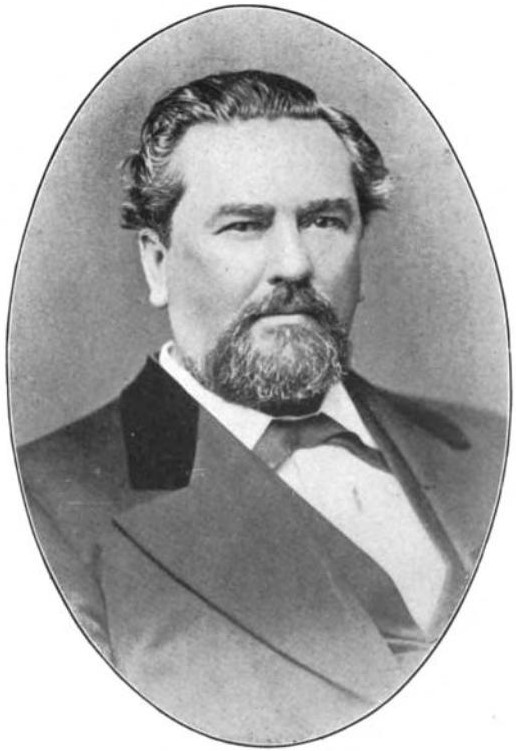

Member of the U.S. House of Representatives from North Carolina's 1st district
- In office January 29, 1881 – March 3, 1881
- Preceded by: Joseph John Martin
- Succeeded by: Louis C. Latham
- In office March 4, 1875 – March 3, 1879
- Preceded by: Clinton L. Cobb
- Succeeded by: Joseph John Martin

Personal details
- Born: May 29, 1829 near Murfreesboro, North Carolina
- Died: September 5, 1892 (aged 63) Washington, D.C.
- Party: Democratic
- Education: Emory & Henry College
- Occupation: Attorney

Military service
- Allegiance: Confederate States of America
- Branch/service: Confederate States Army

Jesse Johnson Yeates (May 29, 1829 – September 5, 1892) was a Democratic U.S. congressman from North Carolina between 1875 and 1881.

== Life and career ==
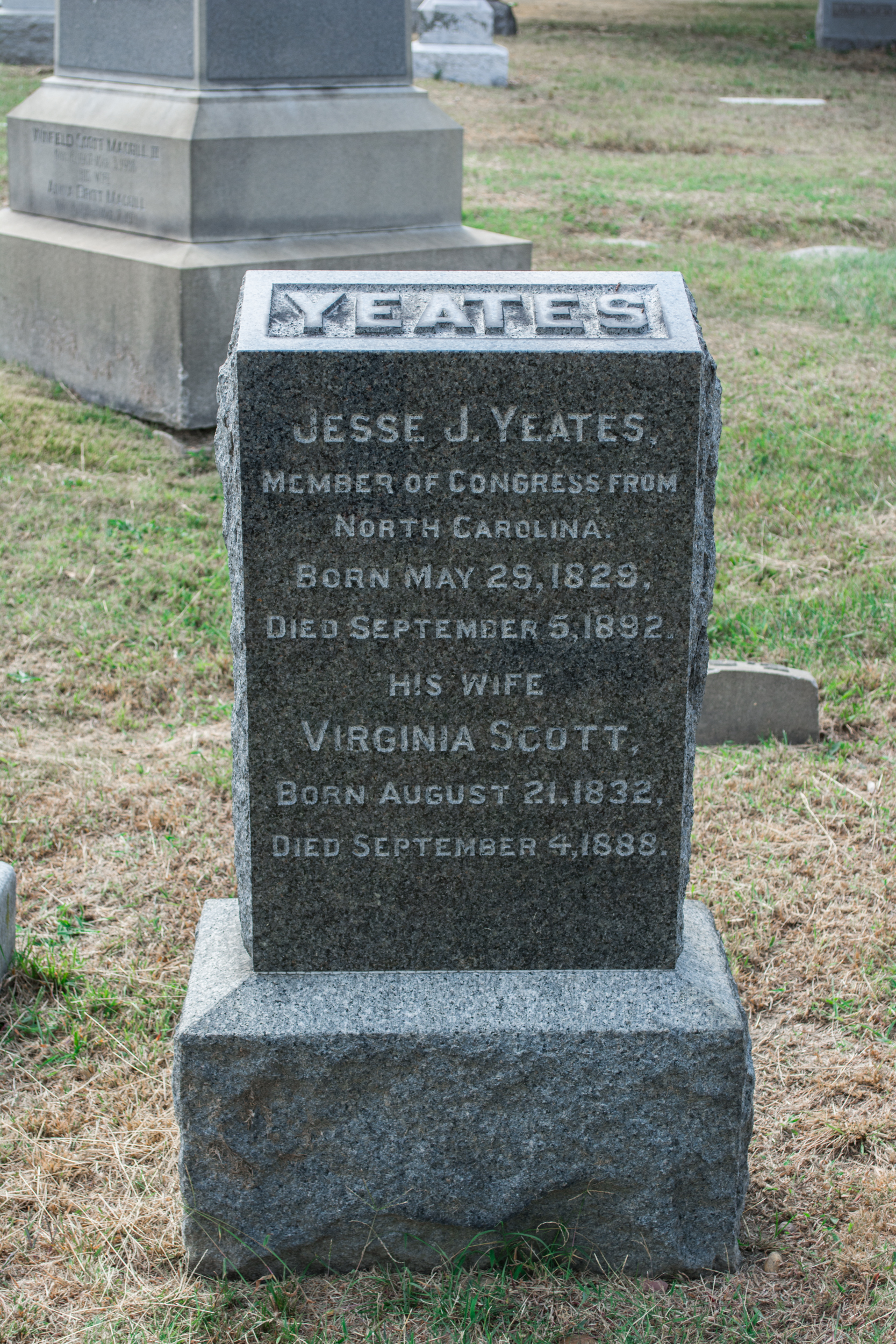
Grave of Jesse Johnson Yeates.

Born in Hertford County, North Carolina, near Murfreesboro, Yeates attended private schools and then Emory and Henry College in Virginia. He studied law and was admitted to the bar in 1855, practicing law in Murfreesboro. He became the prosecuting attorney of Hertford County in 1855, serving until 1860, when he was named solicitor of the first judicial district.

Also in 1860, Yeates was elected to a term in the North Carolina House of Commons, serving for two years. He was a major in the Confederate Army during the American Civil War and was a member of the council of Governor Jonathan Worth.

Named by Governor William Woods Holden as judge of the first judicial district of North Carolina in 1868, Yeates declined the appointment, but remained active in politics. He was a delegate to the 1871 Democratic State Convention and the state Constitutional Convention that same year.

In 1874, Yeates was elected to the U.S. House as a member of the 44th United States Congress. He was re-elected in 1876 and stood again in 1878, losing to Joseph John Martin. Yeates successfully contested Martin's election and served briefly in the U.S. House again from January 29 to March 3, 1881. He declined to run again in 1880 and returned to the practice of law in Washington, DC. He died in Washington in 1892 and is buried in Glenwood Cemetery.

His homes at Murfreesboro, the John Wheeler House and Myrick–Yeates–Vaughan House, are listed on the National Register of Historic Places.

U.S. House of Representatives
Preceded by Clinton L. Cobb	Member of the U.S. House of Representatives from North Carolina's 1st congressional district March 4, 1875 – March 3, 1879	Succeeded by Joseph John Martin
Preceded by Joseph John Martin	Member of the U.S. House of Representatives from North Carolina's 1st congressional district January 29, 1881 – March 3, 1881	Succeeded by Louis C. Latham
