= Melrose (Murfreesboro, North Carolina) =

Historic house in North Carolina, United States

- U.S. National Register of Historic Places
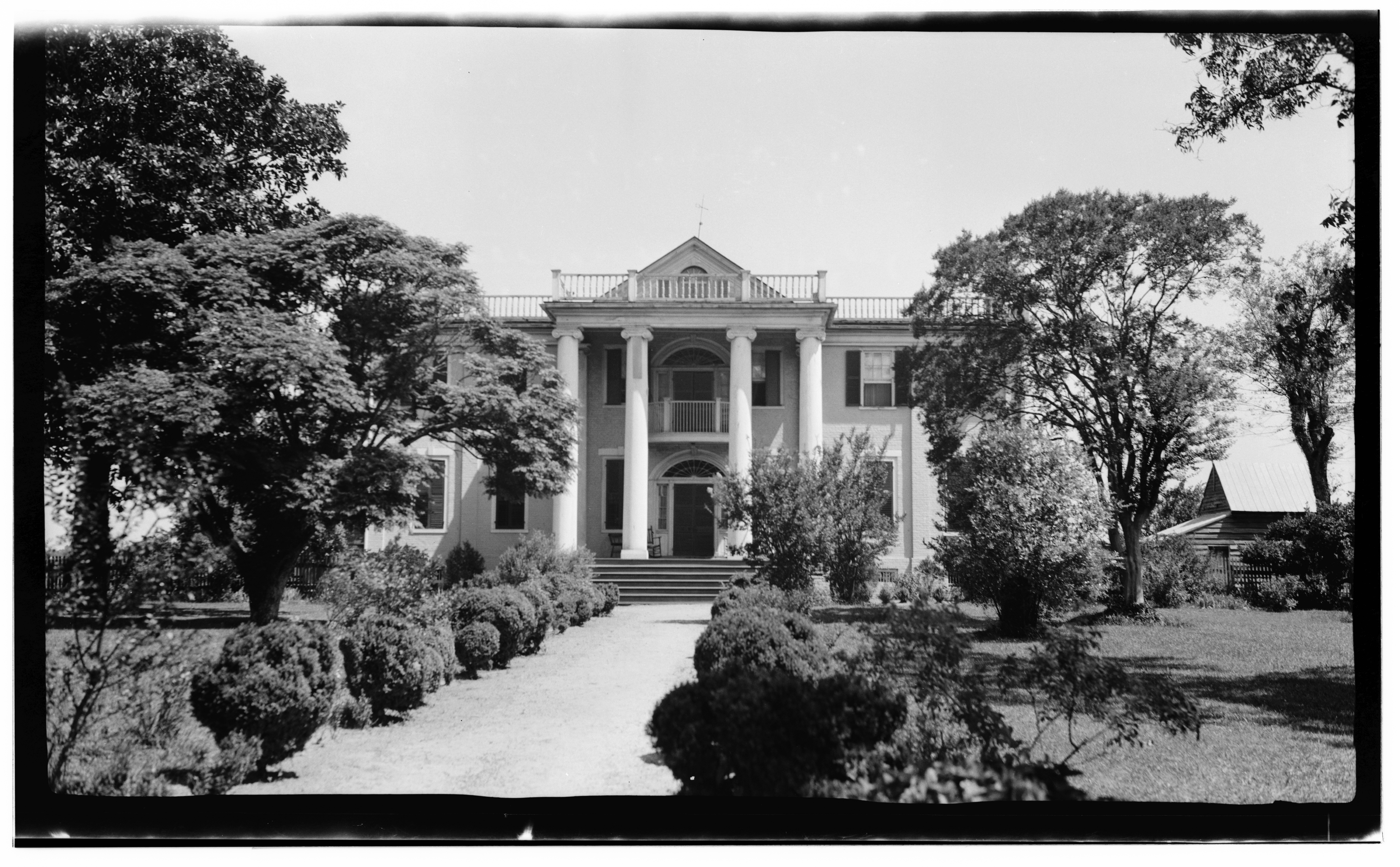
- Murfree House, HABS photo, July 1940

- Location within North Carolina Location within the United States
- Coordinates: 36°26′39″N 77°6′1″W
- Area: 1 acre (0.40 ha)
- Built: c. 1805
- Architectural style: Greek Revival, Federal
- NRHP reference No.: 71000592
- Added to NRHP: March 31, 1971

Melrose is a historic home located in the Murfreesboro Historic District at Murfreesboro, Hertford County, North Carolina. It was built about 1805, as a two-story, Federal-style brick dwelling with a gable roof and interior end chimneys. Two-story, two-bay, Greek Revival-style wings were added in the mid-19th century. It is seven bays wide and features a tetrastyle portico supported by Ionic order columns and a Second story semi-circular balcony. It was built by Congressman William H. Murfree (1781 – 1827), son of Hardy Murfree (1752 – 1809).

It was listed on the National Register of Historic Places in 1971.

== Gallery ==
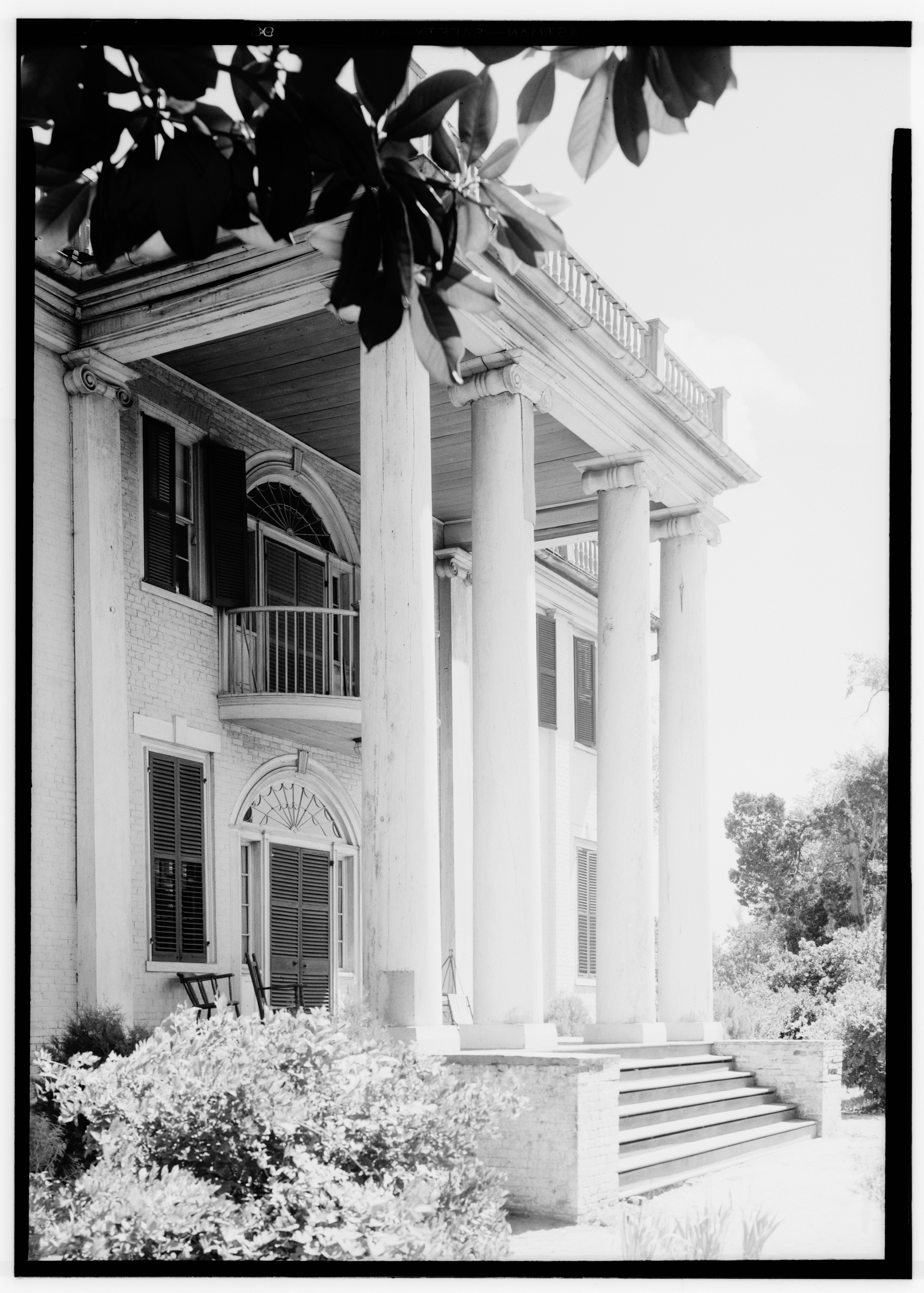
Murfree House, HABS Photo, July 1940
