= Freeman House (Murfreesboro, North Carolina) =

Historic school building in North Carolina, United States

- U.S. National Register of Historic Places
- U.S. Historic district – Contributing property
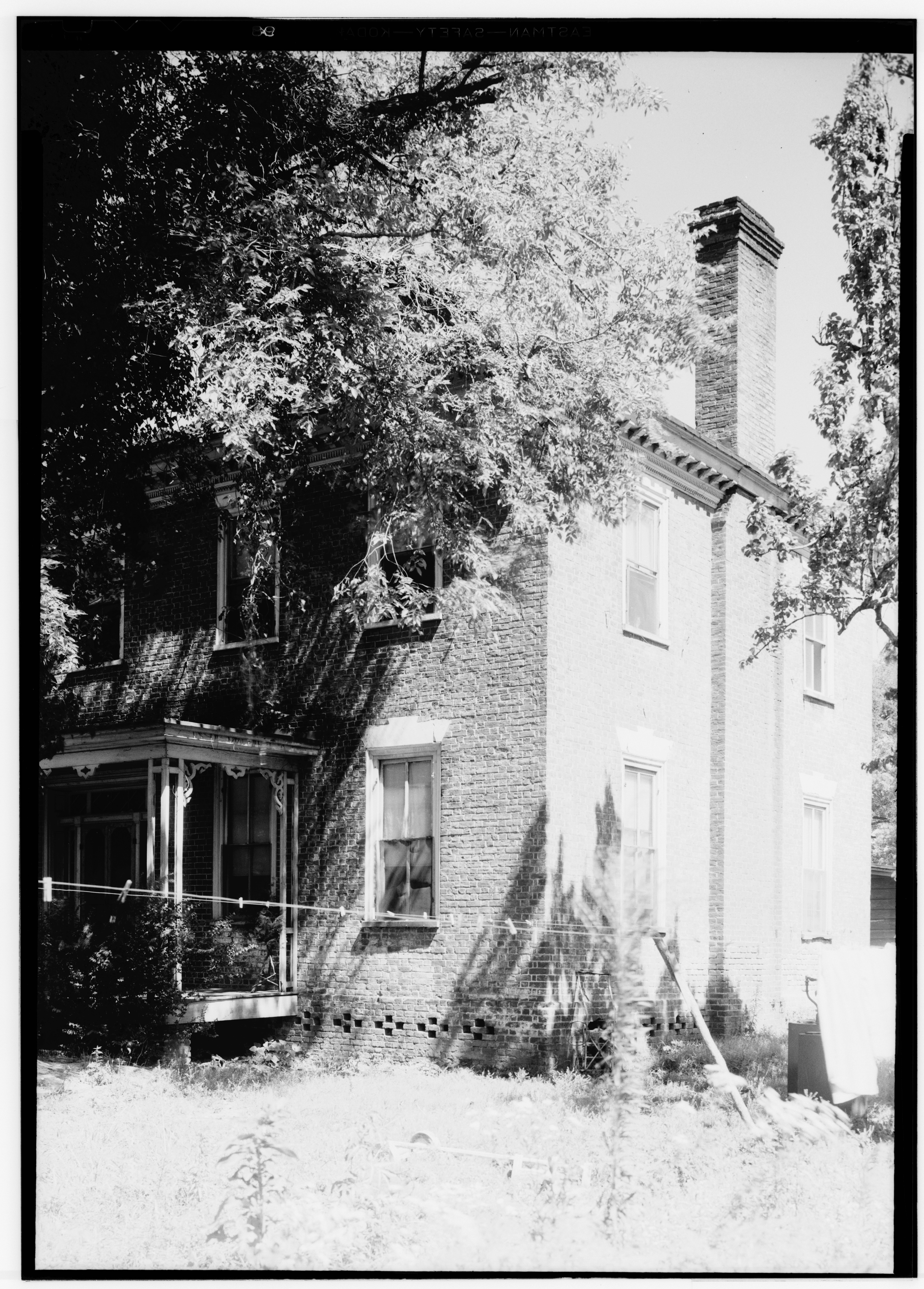
- Freeman House, HABS Photo, July 1940

- Location within North Carolina Location within the United States
- Location: 200 E. Broad St., Murfreesboro, North Carolina
- Coordinates: 36°26′39″N 77°5′59″W
- Area: 0.5 acres (0.20 ha)
- Built: 1810
- Architectural style: Federal
- NRHP reference No.: 71000591
- Added to NRHP: February 18, 1971

Freeman House, also known as The Hertford Academy, is a historic school building located in the Murfreesboro Historic District at Murfreesboro, Hertford County, North Carolina. It was built about 1810, and is a two-story, Federal-style brick building with a hip roof and central passage plan. Its brickwork is laid in Flemish bond. It is considered the birthplace of Chowan University.

It was listed on the National Register of Historic Places in 1971.

== Gallery ==
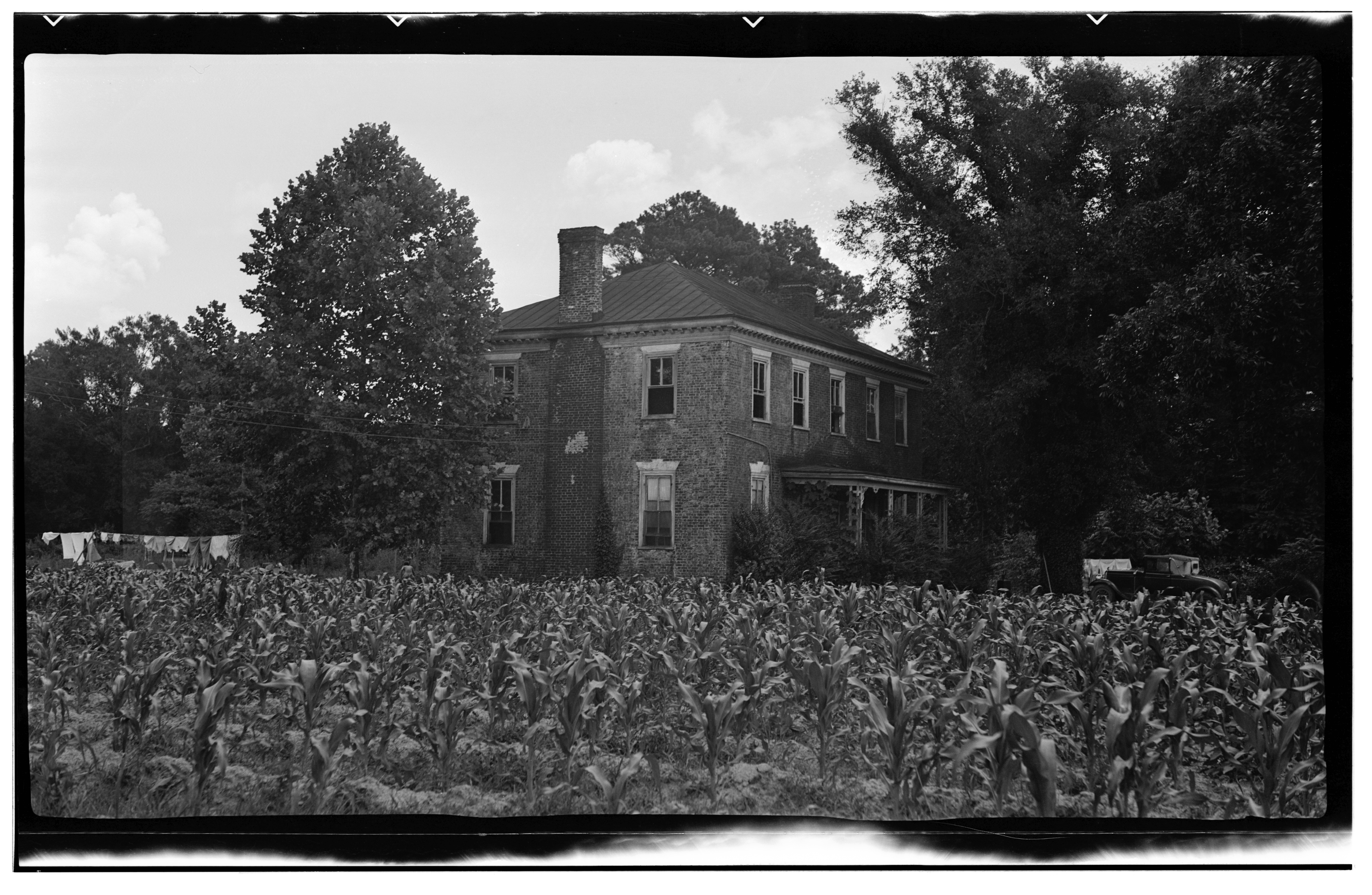
Freeman House, HABS photo, July 1940
