= North Carolina Watermelon Festival =

Coordinates: 36.44281°N 77.09900°W

The North Carolina Watermelon Festival is an annual celebration of the watermelon started in 1957 in Raleigh, North Carolina. In 1985 it was relocated to Murfreesboro, North Carolina. The festival features a seed-spitting contest, the crowning of a "Miss Watermelon" and an award for the best/biggest melons.

== Winners ==
=== Watermelon grower ===
- 1970 - Ed Weeks, 118 lb (53.52 kg; 8.43 st)
- 2004 - Adam Worley, 195.5 lb (88.68 kg; 13.96 st)

=== Miss Watermelon / Watermelon Queen ===
- 1966 Eleanor Brantley
- 1986 Whitney Cuthbertson
- 2003 Tracy Lynn Register
- 2009 Kensley Leonard
- 2014 Breanna Williams
- 2025 Elle Steinlage

=== Seed spitting ===
- 1963 - Wally Ausley - 35 ft 06 in (10.82 m)*
- 1970 - John "Speedy" Adams - 29 ft (8.84 m)
- 2004 - Kristin Cucci

* World Record

== Activities ==
The four-day event now includes:

- a parade
- musical performances
- food festival
- carnival rides
- craft sales
- 5 km run
- watermelon-seed spitting contest
- crowning of the Watermelon Princesses
- a visit from the North Carolina Watermelon Queen
