= Brady C. Jefcoat Museum =

Coordinates: 36.4402°N 77.1023°W

The Brady C. Jefcoat Museum of Americana is a museum in Murfreesboro, North Carolina, USA. Operated by the Murfreesboro Historical Association, the museum houses a collection of American artifacts from the 1850s to the 1950s collected by Brady C. Jefcoat of Raleigh, North Carolina, a local plumber, electrician and general contractor.

The museum's collections include an assortment of glassware, household domestic items, farm tools and equipment, period furniture and many other artifacts. Item collections include toasters, washing machines, irons, churns, music boxes, radios, phonographs, Daisy air rifles, mousetraps, maple syrup taps, beekeeping equipment, mounted animals and dairy equipment filling more than 17,000 square feet of display space. There are over 18,000 items on display.

Opened in 1997, the museum is located in the old Murfreesboro High School.

Brady C. Jefcoat spent 35 years collecting everyday objects, with phonographs being among his favorites. As the story goes, the Smithsonian wanted to display the collection, however, Jefcoat decided to give the items to the Murfreesboro Historical Society. In their hands, he was assured the entire collection would be displayed The historical society then turned the old Murfreesboro High School into a museum, filling it with the collection. The attention given to these everyday items is astonishing. Each room in the museum has a theme, for example, one room is dedicated to washing machines. Then there are the lovely small collections housed in the hallways, such as a shelf filled with decorative tape measures.

The annual Roanoke-Chowan Pork-Fest, a North Carolina barbecue cooking competition, picnic and festival, is held on the grounds of the museum each May to raise money for the museum's maintenance.

The Association also owns and operates the William Rea Museum, tours of the Dr. Walter Reed House, John Wheeler House, the Agriculture and Transportation Museum, the Vincent-Deale Blacksmith Shop, the Evans Tinsmith Shop, the F. Roy Johnson Print Shop, the Winborne Historical Law Office and Country Store, and the Hertford Academy. The Association's office is located in the Roberts-Vaughan House.
