= Dr. Roscius P. and Mary Mitchell Thomas House and Outbuildings =

Historic house in North Carolina, United States

- U.S. National Register of Historic Places
- Location within North Carolina Location within the United States
- Location: 734 Thomas Bridge Rd., near Bethlehem, North Carolina
- Coordinates: 36°18′33″N 76°53′23″W
- Area: 25 acres (10 ha)
- Built: c. 1855, 1887
- Architectural style: Late Victorian, Greek Revival
- NRHP reference No.: 07000884
- Added to NRHP: August 28, 2007

Dr. Roscius P. and Mary Mitchell Thomas House and Outbuildings, also known as the Ruth Thomas Home Farm, is a historic home located near Bethlehem, Hertford County, North Carolina. The house was built in 1887, and is a two-story, three-bay, single-pile, side-gable roof, Late Victorian style frame dwelling with a two-story, gable-roof rear ell. Built into the ell is a Greek Revival style kitchen building. The house is sheathed in weatherboard, sits on a brick foundation, and has a one-story half-hip roof porch. Also on the property are the contributing doctor's office (c. 1855), smoke house (c. 1855), and root cellar (c. 1855).

It was listed on the National Register of Historic Places in 2007.
