= Julian Myrick =

American insurance salesman and tennis promoter

Julian Southall Myrick
- Born: March 1, 1880; Murfreesboro, North Carolina, United States
- Died: January 4, 1969 (aged 88); New York City
- Occupations: Insurer, tennis promoter

Julian Southall Myrick (March 1, 1880 – January 4, 1969) was an American insurance salesman and tennis promoter.

Myrick was born in Murfreesboro, North Carolina on March 1, 1880. In 1898, Myrick entered the insurance business as an application clerk at the Mutual Insurance Company. In 1906, he partnered with his colleague Charles Ives to start their own company, Ives and Myrick.

Myrick was known for his contributions to insurance industry. In 1910, he was involved in founding the first training college for insurance agents. He helped set up American College of Life Underwriters (now known as The American College) in 1927.

He was significantly involved in the promotion of tennis in United States. He was the president West Side Tennis Club in Forest Hills from 1915 to 1917. He was considered instrumental to the increase in the club's prominence, including its being chosen as the venue of US National Championships (now known as U.S. Open). He was influential in construction of Forest Hills Stadium in Forest Hills, Queens which hosted the first Wightman Cup competition. Myrick also served as the president of United States Lawn Tennis Association, (now known as United States Tennis Association) from 1920 to 1922. Myrick promoted induction of tennis in schools and colleges as a major sport and acceptance of the sport on a wider level.

Myrick was first to deliver a speech on tennis by radio in 1922. He was inducted in the International Tennis Hall of Fame in 1969 for his contribution to the sport in the United States and his administrative abilities.

Myrick was a lifelong Republican and a strong supporter Herbert Hoover's candidacy for President of the United States. He was a Republican delegate in New York's 17th congressional district. However, during the presidential election in 1920, Myrick supported Democratic candidate James M. Cox for his stand on League of Nations. Myrick helped in gathering public support for the recommendations of the Hoover Commission.
