= Myrick–Yeates–Vaughan House =

Historic house in North Carolina, United States

- Myrick-Yeates-Vaughan House
- U.S. National Register of Historic Places
- Location within North Carolina Location within the United States
- Location: 327 W. Main St., Murfreesboro, North Carolina
- Coordinates: 36°26′31″N 77°6′21″W
- Area: 1.2 acres (0.49 ha)
- Built: 1851-1855
- Built by: Albert Gamaliel Jones
- Architectural style: Federal, Greek Revival
- NRHP reference No.: 83001891
- Added to NRHP: March 17, 1983

Myrick–Yeates–Vaughan House, also known as the Yeates–Vaughan House, Uriah Vaughan Jr. House, and Sarah Vaughan House, was a historic home located at Murfreesboro, Hertford County, North Carolina. The "T"-plan house consisted of an earlier 1 1/2-story Federal style rear section with a two-story Greek Revival style front section. The Greek Revival was built between 1851 and 1855. It was owned by Congressman Jesse Johnson Yeates (1829-1892) during the 1870s. The house has been demolished.

It was listed on the National Register of Historic Places in 1983.
