= Wiley and Jane Vann Brown House =

Historic house in North Carolina, United States

- U.S. National Register of Historic Places
- Location within North Carolina Location within the United States
- Location: NC 1108, 0.5 miles (0.80 km) north of NC 561, near Union, North Carolina
- Coordinates: 36°18′52″N 77°1′38″W
- Area: 20 acres (8.1 ha)
- Built: 1850
- Architectural style: Greek Revival
- NRHP reference No.: 07000073
- Added to NRHP: February 13, 2007

Wiley and Jane Vann Brown House is a historic home located near Union, Hertford County, North Carolina. It was built about 1850, and is a two-story, single-pile, three-bay, vernacular Greek Revival style timber-frame house. It has a side-gable roof and brick exterior end chimneys. A one-story, side-gable, frame addition built in 2005, is linked to the main block with a one-story hyphen. Also on the property is a contributing heavy timber frame cider barn (c. 1850).

It was listed on the National Register of Historic Places in 2007.
