= Joseph John Martin =

American politician from North Carolina (1833–1900)

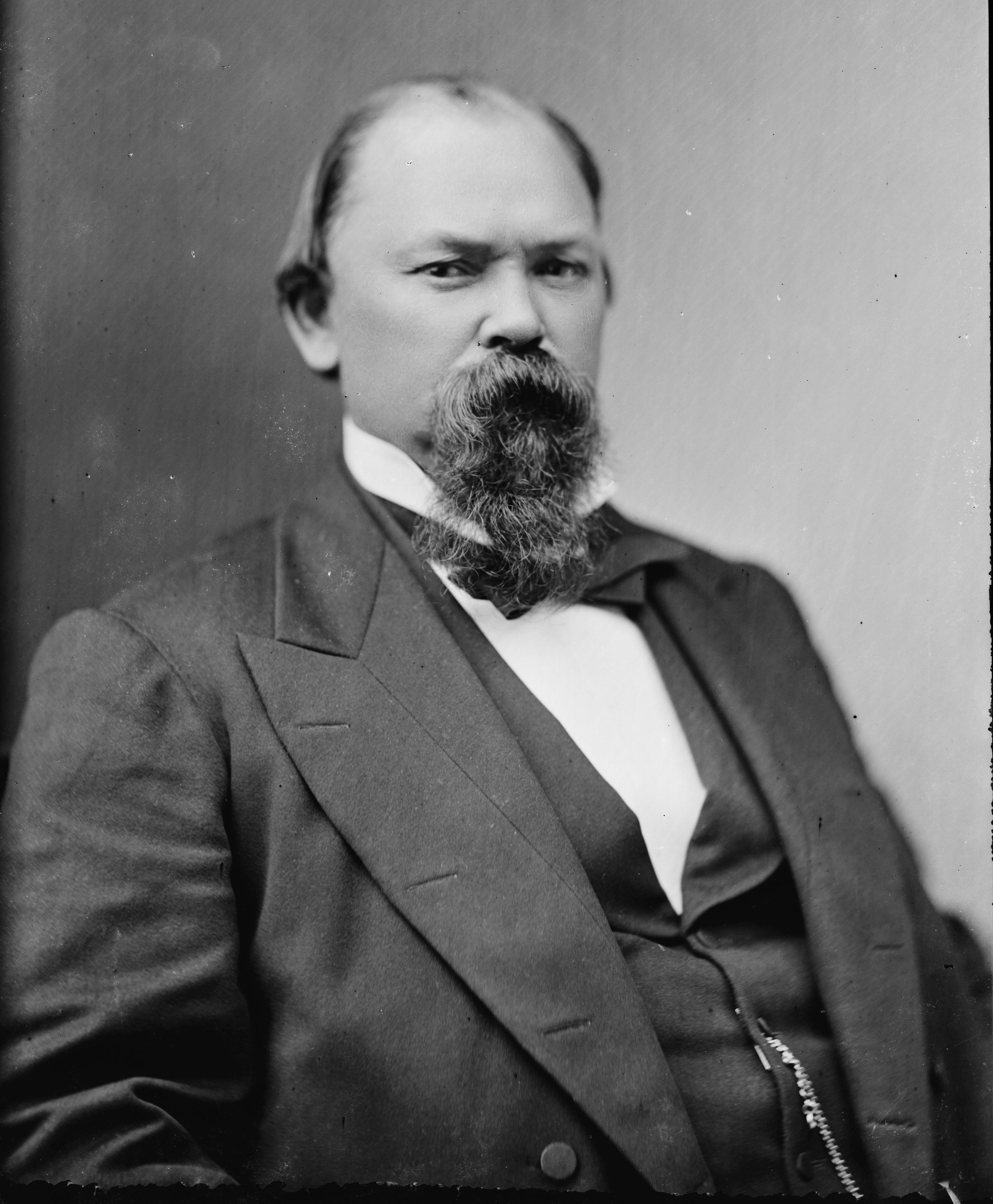

Member of the U.S. House of Representatives from North Carolina's 1st district
- In office March 4, 1879 – January 29, 1881
- Preceded by: Jesse Johnson Yeates
- Succeeded by: Jesse Johnson Yeates

Personal details
- Born: November 21, 1833 Williamston, North Carolina
- Died: December 18, 1900 (aged 67) Tarboro, North Carolina
- Party: Republican
- Occupation: Attorney

Joseph John Martin (November 21, 1833 – December 18, 1900) was a Republican U.S. congressman from North Carolina, United States between 1879 and 1881.

Born in Williamston in Martin County, North Carolina, Martin attended Williamston Academy and then studied law. He was admitted to the bar in 1859 and became the prosecuting attorney of Martin County. He was elected solicitor for North Carolina's second judicial district in 1868 and was re-elected to that post in 1874. Martin was a member of the Republican party and a delegate to the 1876 Republican National Convention.

In 1878, Martin was elected to the U.S. House, defeating incumbent Democrat Jesse Johnson Yeates. Although Martin served most of his two-year term, Yeates successfully contested the election and unseated Martin on January 29, 1881, two months before the expiration of Martin's term.

After leaving Congress, Martin returned to the practice of law in Tarboro, North Carolina; he was that town's postmaster from 1897 until his death in 1900. Martin is buried in Woodlawn Cemetery in Williamston, his hometown.

U.S. House of Representatives
Preceded by Jesse J. Yeates	Member of the U.S. House of Representatives from North Carolina's 1st congressional district March 4, 1879 – January 29, 1881	Succeeded by Jesse J. Yeates
