= Roanoke-Chowan News-Herald =

- Type: tri-weekly newspaper
- Owner(s): Boone Newspapers, Inc
- Publisher: Tony Clark
- Editor: Calvin Bryant
- Founded: 1996
- Headquarters: 801 Parker Ave. E P.O. Box 1325; Ahoskie, North Carolina 27910United States
- Circulation: 6,800 paid 5,000 free (as of 2018)
- Website: roanoke-chowannewsherald.com

The Roanoke-Chowan News-Herald is a newspaper founded in 1914 as the Ahoskie Patriot. It serves the rural North Carolina communities of Bertie, Hertford, Northampton and Gates counties, including the towns of Ahoskie, Murfreesboro and Windsor. It is published on Wednesday and Saturday.

The paper gets its name from the location of its primary region of distribution between the Roanoke River and Chowan River in Northeastern North Carolina, a location that includes Bertie, Hertford, and Northampton counties.

The inclusion of Gates County is the result of a merger with the Gates County Index.

Media General sold the paper to Boone Newspapers Inc. of Tuscaloosa, Ala in 2000.
