= William Rea Store =

- U.S. National Register of Historic Places
- U.S. Historic district – Contributing property
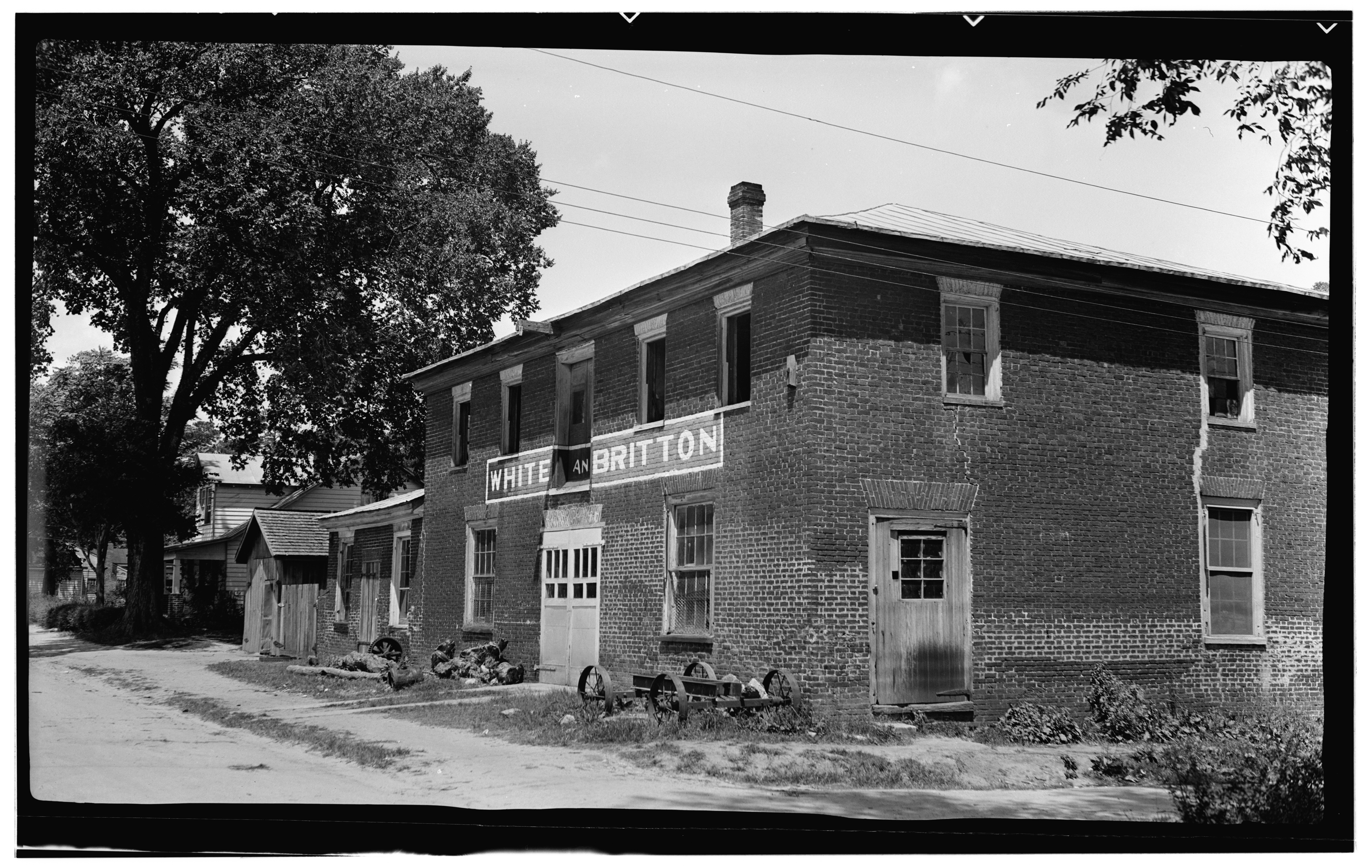
- White and Britton Store, HABS photo, July 1940

- Location within North Carolina Location within the United States
- Location: E. Williams St., Murfreesboro, North Carolina
- Coordinates: 36°26′38″N 77°5′54″W
- Area: 0.2 acres (0.081 ha)
- Built: 1790
- NRHP reference No.: 70000457
- Added to NRHP: September 15, 1970

William Rea Store is a historic commercial building located in the Murfreesboro Historic District at Murfreesboro, Hertford County, North Carolina. It was built about 1790, and is a two-story, three-bay, brick building with a one-story, three-bay wing. It is one of the oldest commercial buildings in North Carolina. The brickwork is laid in Flemish bond. It was built by William Rea, a wealthy Boston merchant.

It was listed on the National Register of Historic Places in 1970.

The building is owned by the Murfreesboro Historical Association and serves as its main museum site, the William Rea Museum. Exhibits include area agriculture, education, architecture, river trade, Native American life, and the lives of inventors Richard Jordan Gatling and his brother James Henry Gatling. The Association also operates the Brady C. Jefcoat Museum, tours of Dr. Walter Reed House, John Wheeler House, shops and the Agriculture and Transportation Museum. The Association's office is located in the Roberts-Vaughan House.
