= David A. Barnes House =

Historic house in North Carolina, United States

- U.S. National Register of Historic Places
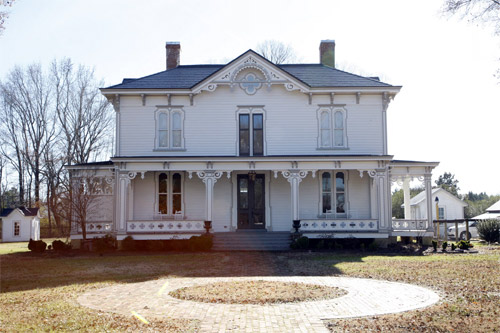
- The David A. Barnes House

- Location within North Carolina Location within the United States
- Location: 625 W. Main St., Murfreesboro, North Carolina
- Coordinates: 36°26′30″N 77°6′37″W
- Area: 1 acre (0.40 ha)
- Built: 1875
- Architectural style: Italianate
- NRHP reference No.: 14000333
- Added to NRHP: June 13, 2014

David A. Barnes House is a historic home located at Murfreesboro, Hertford County, North Carolina. It was built in 1875, and is a two-story, three-bay, Italianate style frame dwelling with a hip-roof. It is sheathed in weatherboard and features a one-story, hip-roof porch supported by four square-paneled posts with sawn brackets. Also on the property are the contributing four-hole privy, a kitchen house, and two miscellaneous outbuildings.

It was listed on the National Register of Historic Places in 2014.
