= Hertford County Public Schools =

School district in North Carolina, United States

Location
- Hertford County, North Carolina United States

District information
- Type: Public
- Grades: PK–12
- Superintendent: Dr. Jesse J. Pratt
- Asst. superintendent(s): T. Chanel Sidbury
- Schools: 7
- Budget: $ 36,488,000
- NCES District ID: 3702160

Students and staff
- Students: 2,500
- Teachers: 223.45 (on FTE basis)
- Staff: 297.31 (on FTE basis)
- Student–teacher ratio: 14.78:1

Other information
- Website: www.hertford.k12.nc.us

Hertford County Public Schools (also called Hertford County Schools) is a PK–12 graded school district serving Hertford County, North Carolina. The accredited district is led by superintendent Dr. Jesse Pratt and has a five-member board of education. Its seven schools serve 2,500 students as of the 2021–22 school year.

It is the sole school district covering the county.

== History ==
In 2006, after several years of high turnover rates for teachers, Hertford County Public Schools worked with Partners for Hertford County Public Schools Foundation to build apartments on property owned by the school which was deeded to the foundation. The foundation built low cost housing to attract teachers into the area and help with teacher retention. Construction began on what is called Hertford Pointe in December of that year with two million dollars pledged for the project, with some of the funding comes from the North Carolina State Employees Credit Union, along with support from town, businesses and the state. Construction was completed in 2007 with the buildings being dedicated on October 29 of that year.

Hertford County High School was first accredited by AdvancED in 1986 and the district's middle school also received accreditation in 1988. In 2006, the district as a whole sought its first accreditation. The process lasted until the 2008 review approved accreditation for the system. AdvancED awarded the accreditation on January 27, 2009.

== Student demographics ==
For the 2021–22 school year, Hertford County Public Schools had a total population of 2,500 students and 176.19 teachers on a (FTE) basis, a student-teacher ratio of 14.09:1. That same year, out of the total student population, the gender ratio was 51% male to 49% female. The demographic group makeup was: Black, 59%; White, 33%; Hispanic, 4%; American Indian, 1%; Asian/Pacific Islander, 1%, and two or more races, 3%. For the same school year, 83.04% of the students received free and reduced-cost lunches.

== Governance ==
The primary governing body of Hertford County Public Schools follows a council–manager government format with a five-member Board of Education appointing a Superintendent to run the day-to-day operations of the system. The school system currently resides in the North Carolina State Board of Education's First District.

=== Board of education ===
The five members of the Board of Education generally meet on the last Monday of each month. The current members of the board are: Sheila J. Porter (Chair), Eddie Hall (Vice-Chair), Dennis M. Deloatch, J. Wendell Hall, and David Shields.

=== Superintendent ===
Dr. Jesse J. Pratt, previously deputy superintendent of operations with Winston-Salem/Forsyth County Schools (WS/FCS), was selected superintendent of the system in November, 2022.

== Member schools ==
Hertford County Public Schools has seven schools ranging from pre-kindergarten to twelfth grade. These are separated into three high schools, one middle schools, and three elementary schools.

=== High schools ===
- C. S. Brown High School S.T.E.M. (Winton)
- Hertford County Early College High School (Ahoskie)
- Hertford County High School (Ahoskie)

=== Middle schools ===
- Hertford County Middle School (Murfreesboro)

=== Elementary schools ===
- Ahoskie Elementary School (Ahoskie)
- Bearfield Primary School (Ahoskie)
- Riverview Elementary School (Murfreesboro)

== Athletics ==
Athletic departments for the district schools are members of the North Carolina High School Athletic Association. The only school that competes is Hertford County High, a 2A school in the Northeastern Coastal Conference.

== See also ==
- List of school districts in North Carolina
