= Millennium, North Carolina =

- Unincorporated community
- Location within North Carolina Location within the United States
- Coordinates: 36°14′56″N 77°05′38″W
- Country: United States
- State: North Carolina
- County: Hertford
- Elevation: 62 ft (19 m)
- Time zone: UTC-5 (Eastern (EST))
  - Summer (DST): UTC-4 (EDT)
- Postal code: 27805
- Area code: 252
- GNIS feature ID: 1021462

Millennium is an unincorporated community in Hertford County, North Carolina, United States. The community is located on North Carolina Highway 11 Business near the southern border of the county, 1.8 miles (2.9 km) northeast of Aulander.

== "New Millennium" ==
When the new millennium happened on January 1, 2000, the small community received national attention for being the only community in the United States named "Millennium". On New Year's Eve (December 31, 1999), residents gathered in the communities' church tabernacle, built 88 years prior (as of 2000) for a summer revivals. At the stroke of midnight a crane lifted a giant dove over a vacant field; a deliberate act to be different.
