= Myrick House =

Historic house in North Carolina, United States

- U.S. National Register of Historic Places
- U.S. Historic district – Contributing property
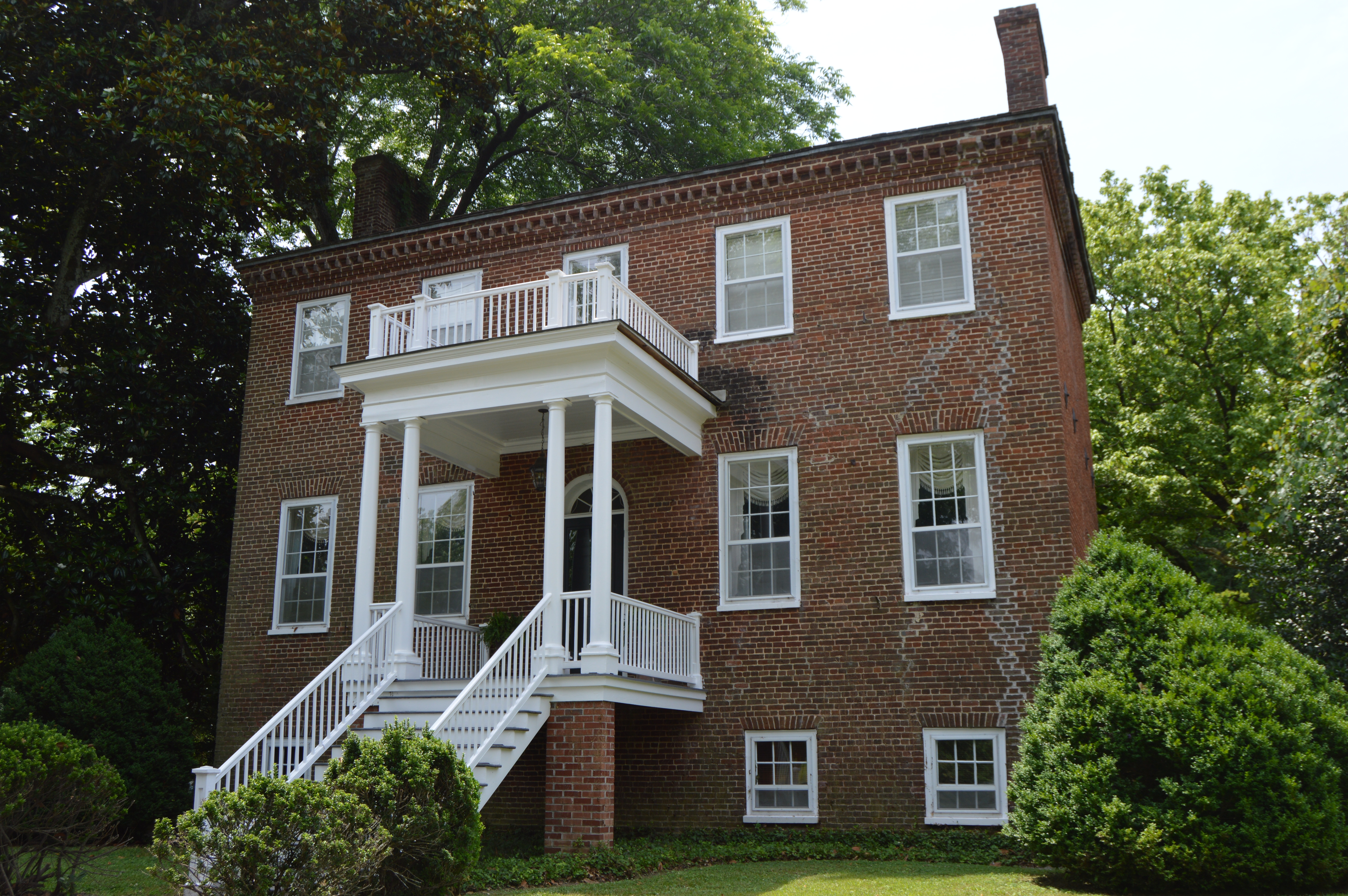
- Front and western side

- Location within North Carolina Location within the United States
- Location: 402 Broad St., Murfreesboro, North Carolina
- Coordinates: 36°26′38″N 77°5′55″W
- Area: 1 acre (0.40 ha)
- Built: c. 1805
- Architectural style: Federal
- NRHP reference No.: 71000594
- Added to NRHP: March 31, 1971

Myrick House is a historic home located in the Murfreesboro Historic District at Murfreesboro, Hertford County, North Carolina. It was built about 1805, and is a two-story, five-bay, Federal-style brick dwelling with a low hip roof and interior end chimneys. The front facade features a one-story hip roofed front porch supported by four fluted columns. It has a one-story, frame rear wing. It was built by James Morgan, a prominent local merchant.

It was listed on the National Register of Historic Places in 1971.
