= Roberts-Vaughan House =

Historic house in North Carolina, United States

- U.S. National Register of Historic Places
- U.S. Historic district – Contributing property
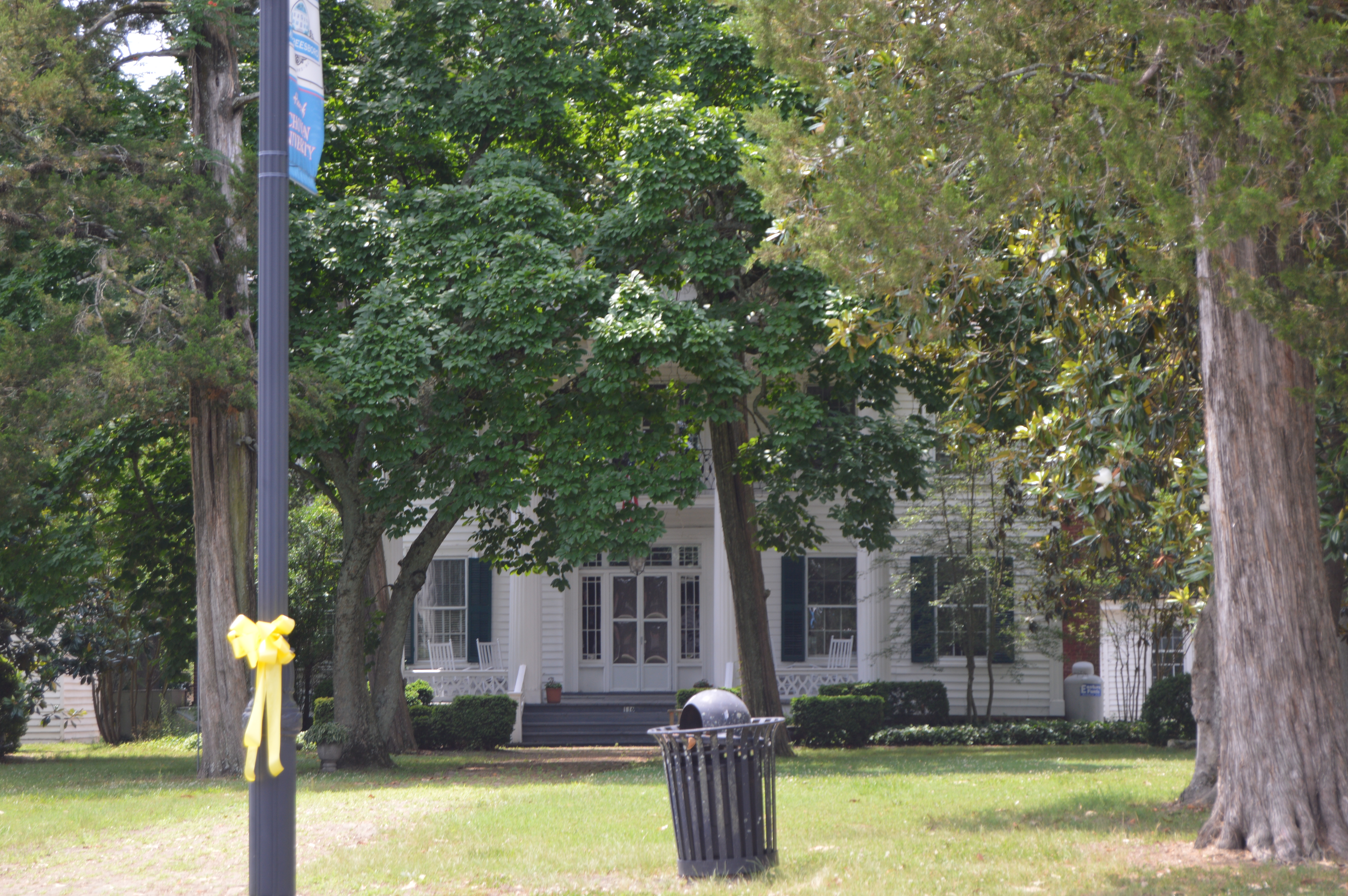
- Facade

- Location within North Carolina Location within the United States
- Location: 130 E. Main St., Murfreesboro, North Carolina
- Coordinates: 36°26′33″N 77°6′1″W
- Area: 1 acre (0.40 ha)
- Built: c. 1805
- Architectural style: Greek Revival, Federal
- NRHP reference No.: 71000595
- Added to NRHP: February 18, 1971

Roberts-Vaughan House is a historic home located in the Murfreesboro Historic District at Murfreesboro, Hertford County, North Carolina. It was built about 1805, as a two-story, five-bay, Federal style frame dwelling with a gable roof. The front facade features a large three bay tetrastyle pedimented portico in the Greek Revival style. It was built by Benjamin Roberts, a prominent local merchant.

It was listed on the National Register of Historic Places in 1971.

The house is owned by the Murfreesboro Historical Association and houses its offices and the Chamber of Commerce. The Association also operates the Brady C. Jefcoat Museum, William Rea Museum, Dr. Walter Reed House, John Wheeler House, various shops and the Agriculture and Transportation Museum.
