= John Wheeler House (Murfreesboro, North Carolina) =

Historic house in North Carolina, United States

- U.S. National Register of Historic Places
- U.S. Historic district – Contributing property
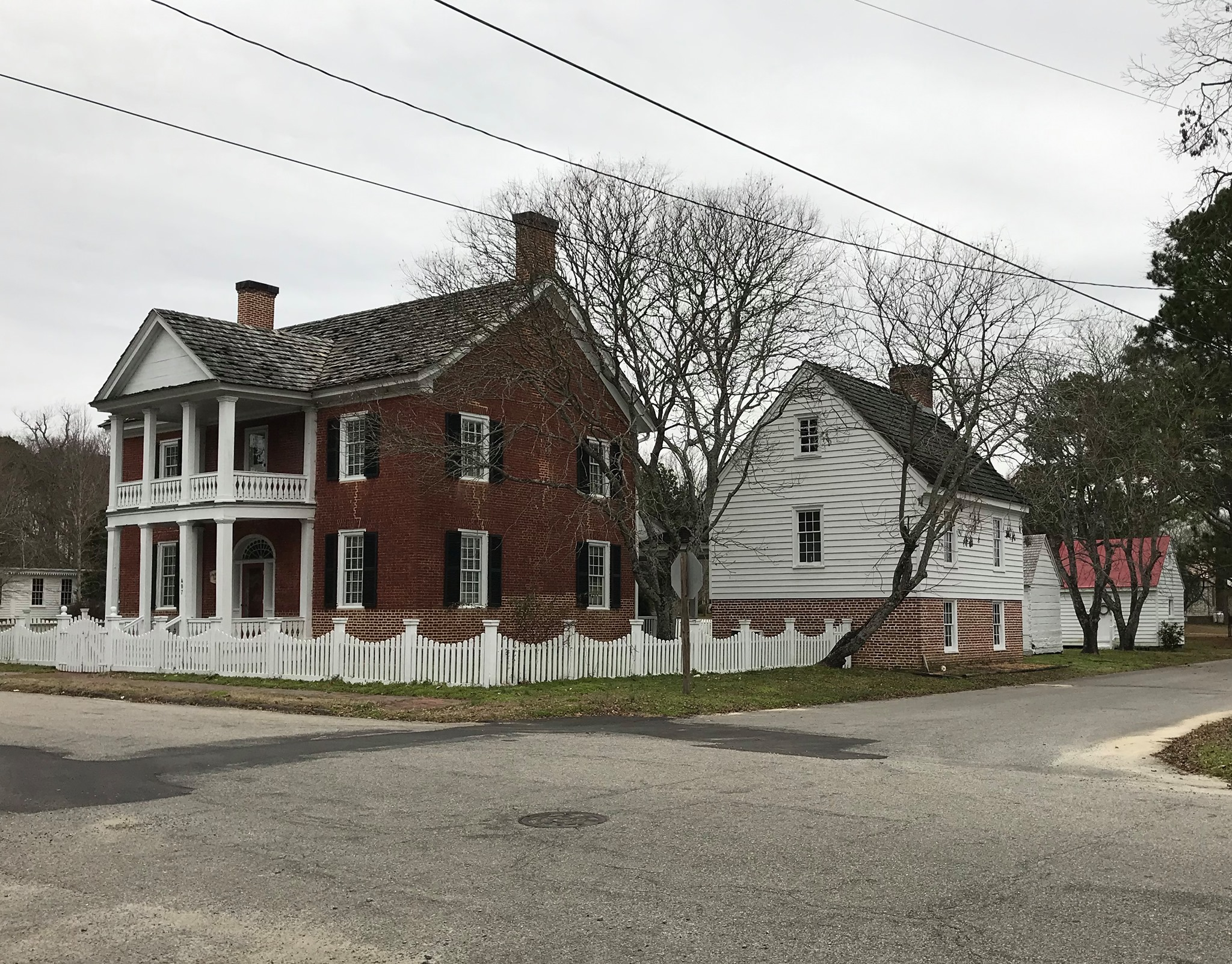

- Location within North Carolina Location within the United States
- Location: 407 E. Broad St., Murfreesboro, North Carolina, U.S.
- Coordinates: 36°26′39″N 77°5′54″W
- Area: 0.5 acres (0.20 ha)
- Built: c. 1805
- Architectural style: Federal, Vernacular Federal
- NRHP reference No.: 71000596
- Added to NRHP: March 31, 1971

John Wheeler House is a historic home located in the Murfreesboro Historic District at Murfreesboro, Hertford County, North Carolina. It was built about 1805, and is a two-story, three-bay, vernacular Federal-style Flemish bond brick dwelling with a central passage plan. The front facade features a later two-story pedimented portico. It was the birthplace of John H. Wheeler (1806-1882) and later home of Congressman Jesse Johnson Yeates (1829-1892).

It was listed on the National Register of Historic Places in 1971.

== Gallery ==
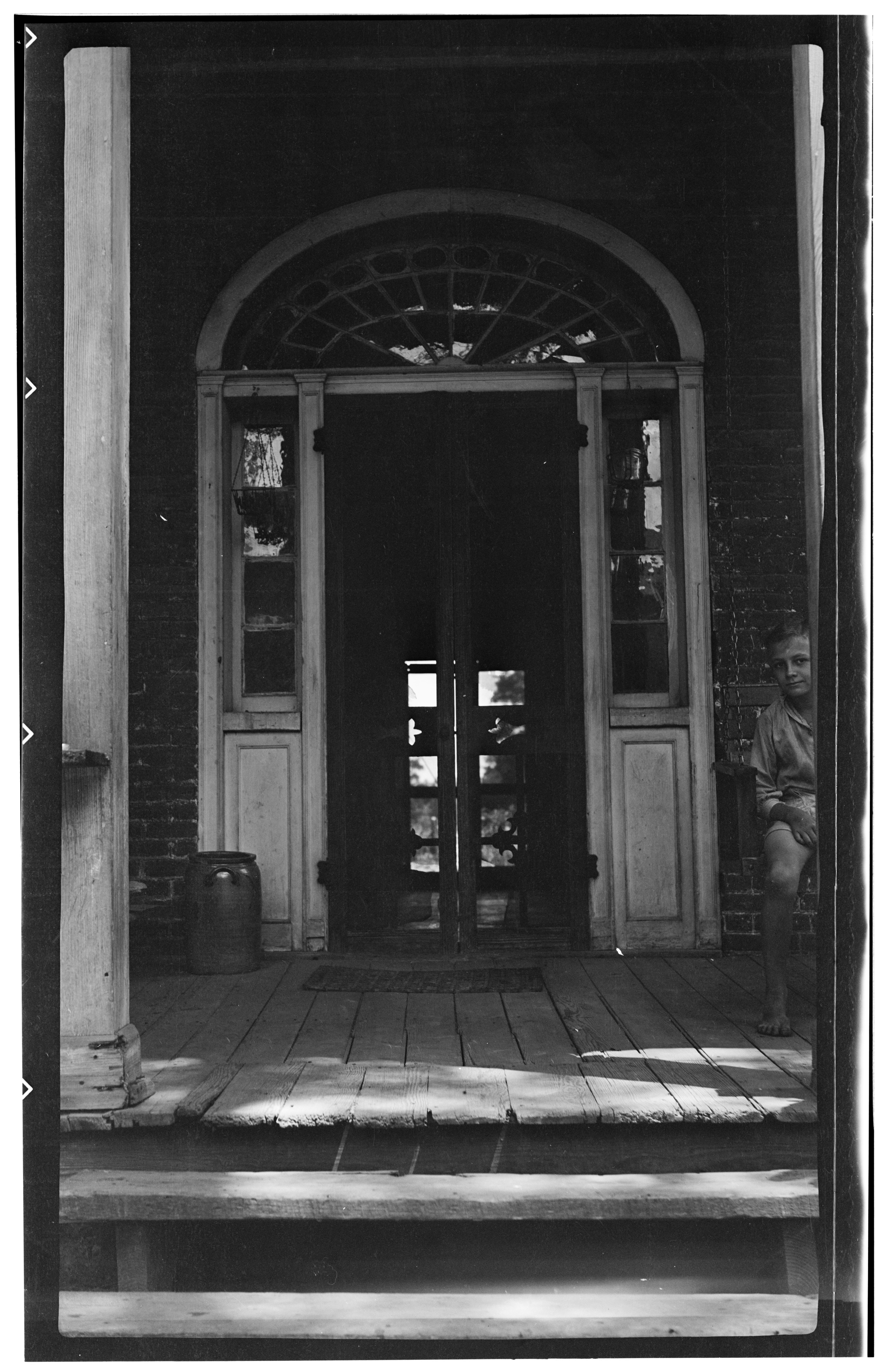
Trader House, HABS photo, July 1940

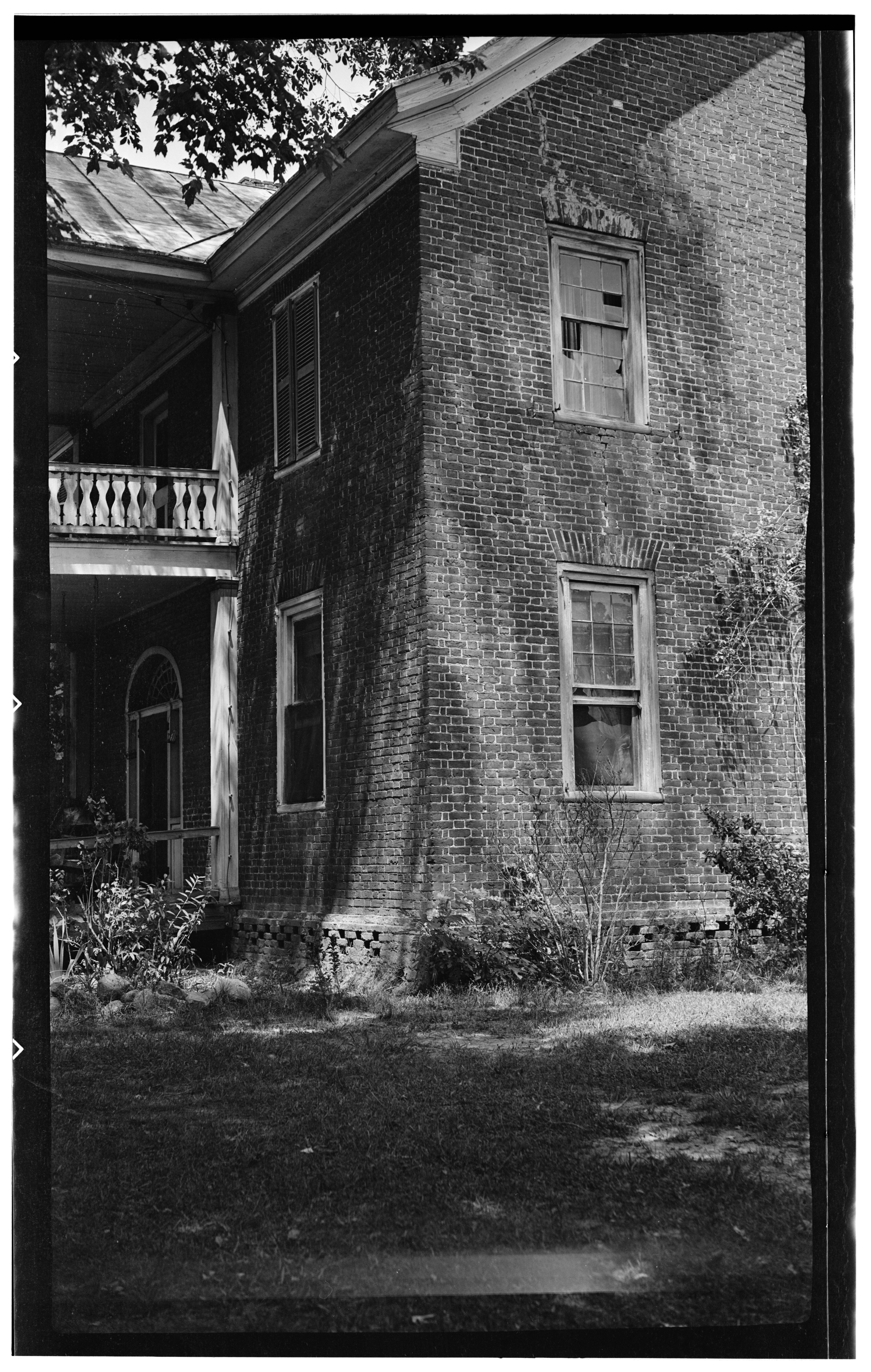
Trader House, HABS photo, July 1940
