= The Cedars (Murfreesboro, North Carolina) =

Historic house in North Carolina, United States

- U.S. National Register of Historic Places
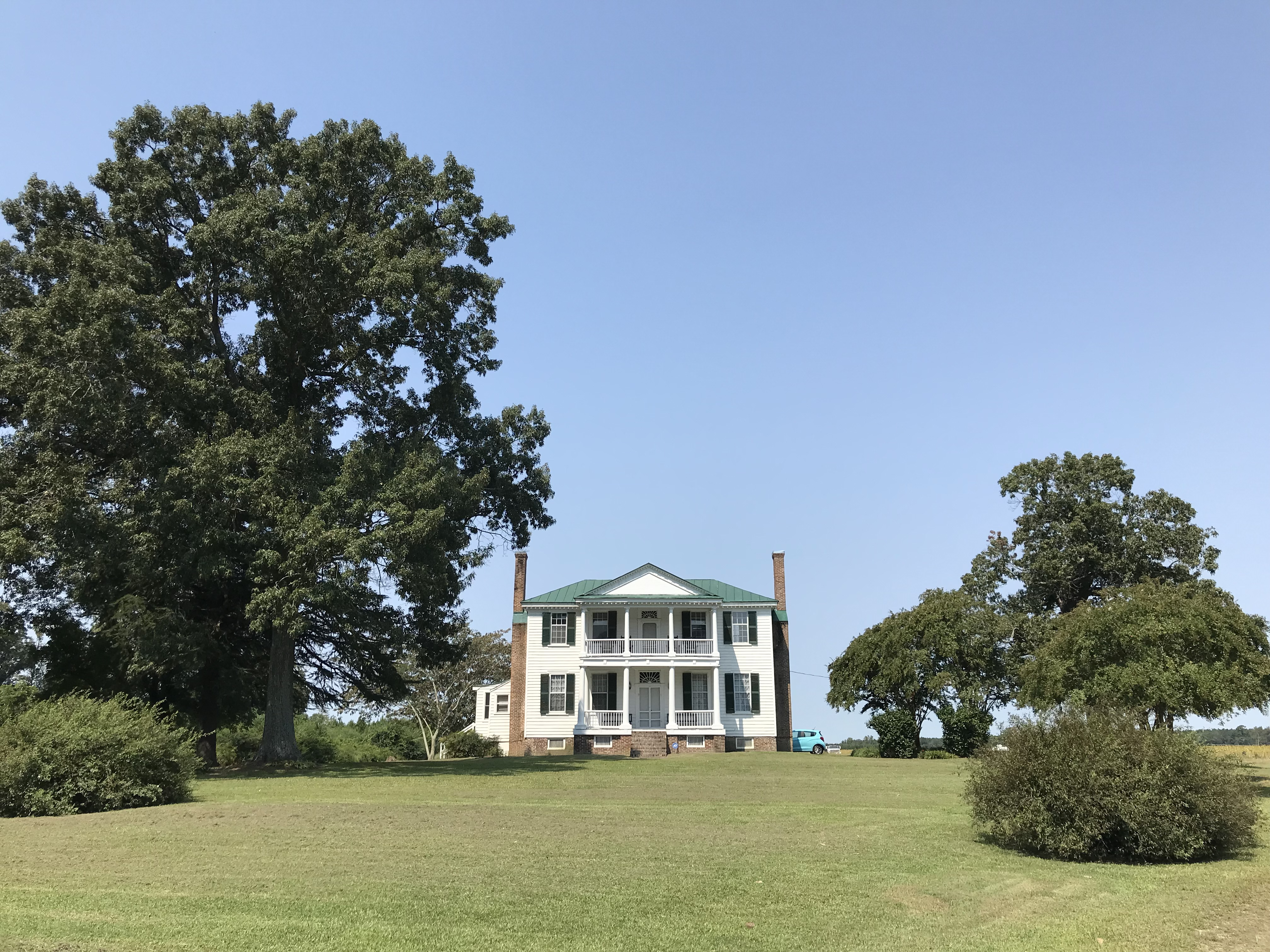

- Location within North Carolina Location within the United States
- Location: Southeast of Murfreesboro off SR 1167, near Murfreesboro, North Carolina
- Coordinates: 36°23′38″N 77°4′10″W
- Area: 419 acres (170 ha)
- Built: c. 1830
- Architectural style: Federal
- NRHP reference No.: 83001890
- Added to NRHP: September 22, 1983

The Cedars, also known as the T. E. Browne House, is a historic home located near Murfreesboro, Hertford County, North Carolina. It was built about 1830, and is a two-story, Federal style frame dwelling with a hip roof. The front facade features a pedimented double portico supported by eight tapered columns. Also on the property are a contributing outbuilding and plank smokehouse.

It was listed on the National Register of Historic Places in 1983.
