= Cowper-Thompson House =

Historic house in North Carolina, United States

- U.S. National Register of Historic Places
- Location within North Carolina Location within the United States
- Location: 405 North St., Murfreesboro, North Carolina
- Coordinates: 36°26′43″N 77°5′49″W
- Area: 1 acre (0.40 ha)
- Built: c. 1790
- Architectural style: Georgian, Federal
- NRHP reference No.: 91001908
- Added to NRHP: January 9, 1992

Cowper-Thompson House, also known as the William Cowper House and Reverend Thompson House, is a historic home located at Murfreesboro, Hertford County, North Carolina. It was built about 1790, and is a 1 1/2-story, five-bay, transitional Georgian / Federal style frame dwelling with a center-hall plan. It is sheathed in weatherboard and is connected to the original kitchen dependency by a new kitchen addition. The house was restored in 1978–1980.

It was listed on the National Register of Historic Places in 1992.
