= The Columns (Murfreesboro, North Carolina) =

Historic school building in North Carolina, United States

- U.S. National Register of Historic Places
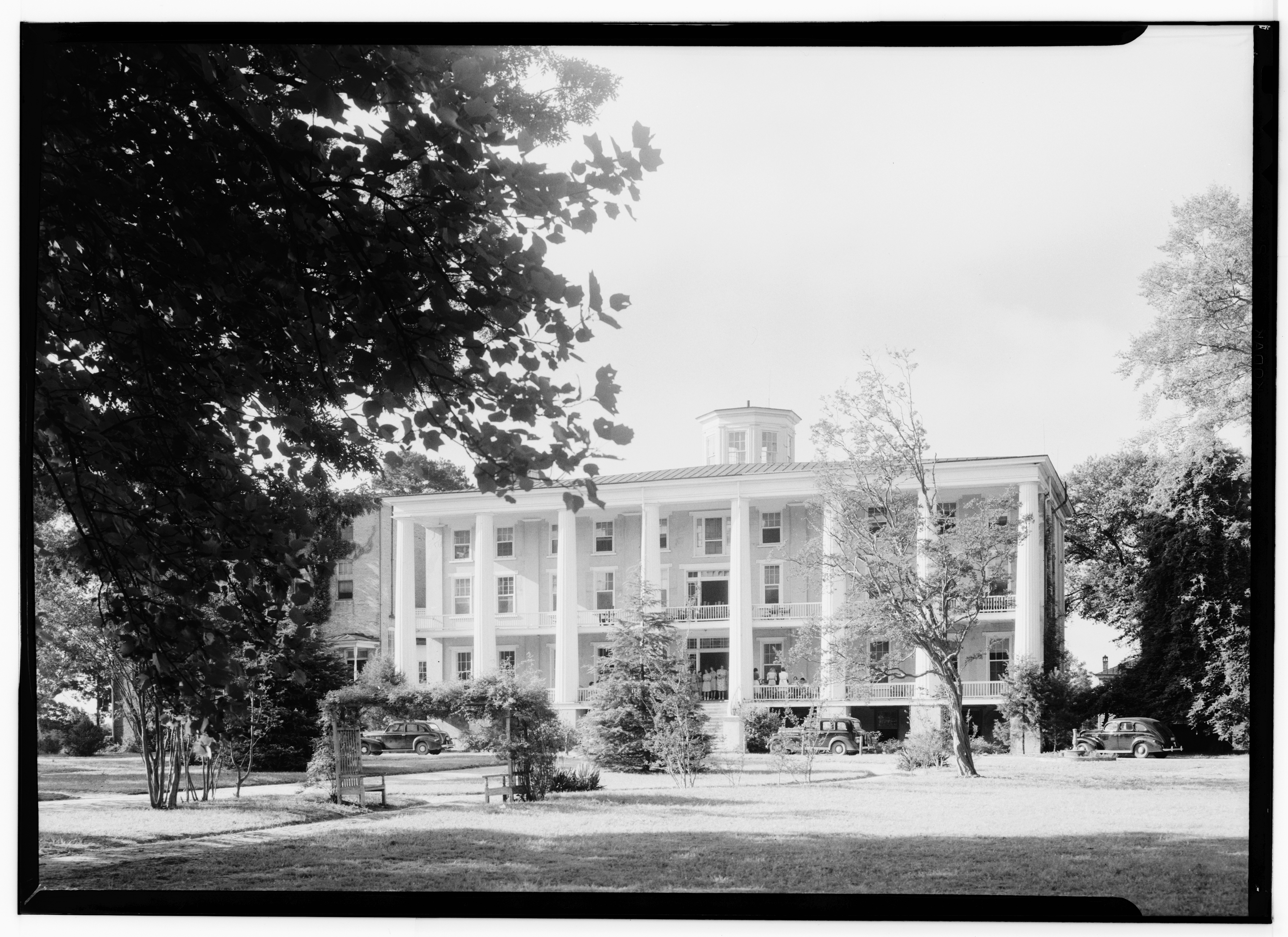
- Chowan College, HABS photo, July 1940

- Location within North Carolina Location within the United States
- Location: Jones Dr., Murfreesboro, North Carolina
- Coordinates: 36°26′33″N 77°5′59″W
- Area: 1.5 acres (0.61 ha)
- Built: 1852
- Architect: Jones, Albert G.
- Architectural style: Greek Revival
- NRHP reference No.: 71000590
- Added to NRHP: February 18, 1971

The Columns, also known as the McDowell Columns Building, is a historic school building located at Murfreesboro, Hertford County, North Carolina. It was built about 1852, and is a three-story, Greek Revival-style stuccoed brick building with a low hip roof and octagonal belvedere. The front facade features a massive portico supported by eight Doric order columns. It was built to house the Chowan Baptist Female Institute, later Chowan University. The building houses the school's administrative offices.

It was listed on the National Register of Historic Places in 1971.

== Gallery ==
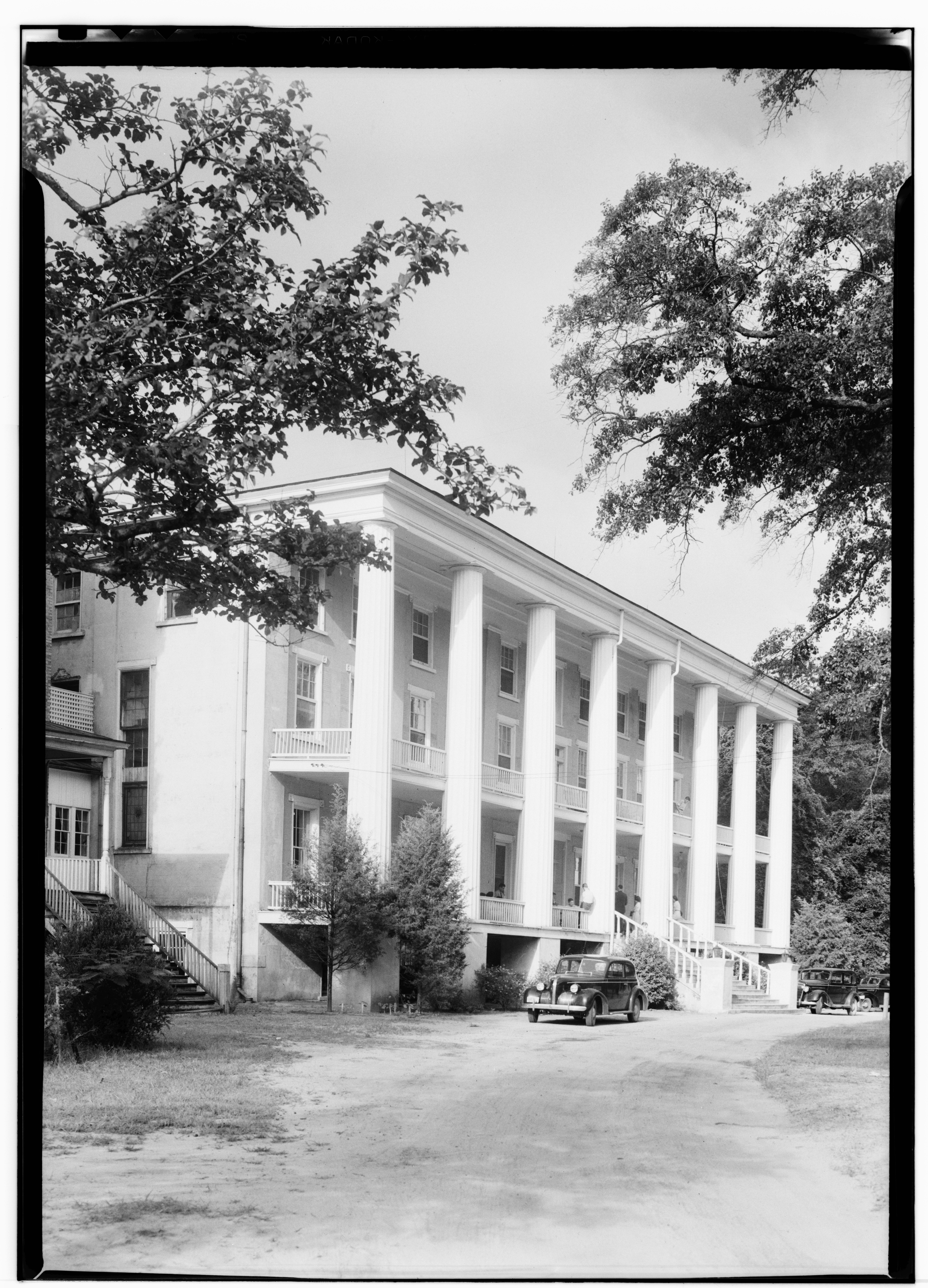
Chowan College, HABS photo, July 1940
