= Murfreesboro, North Carolina =

- Town
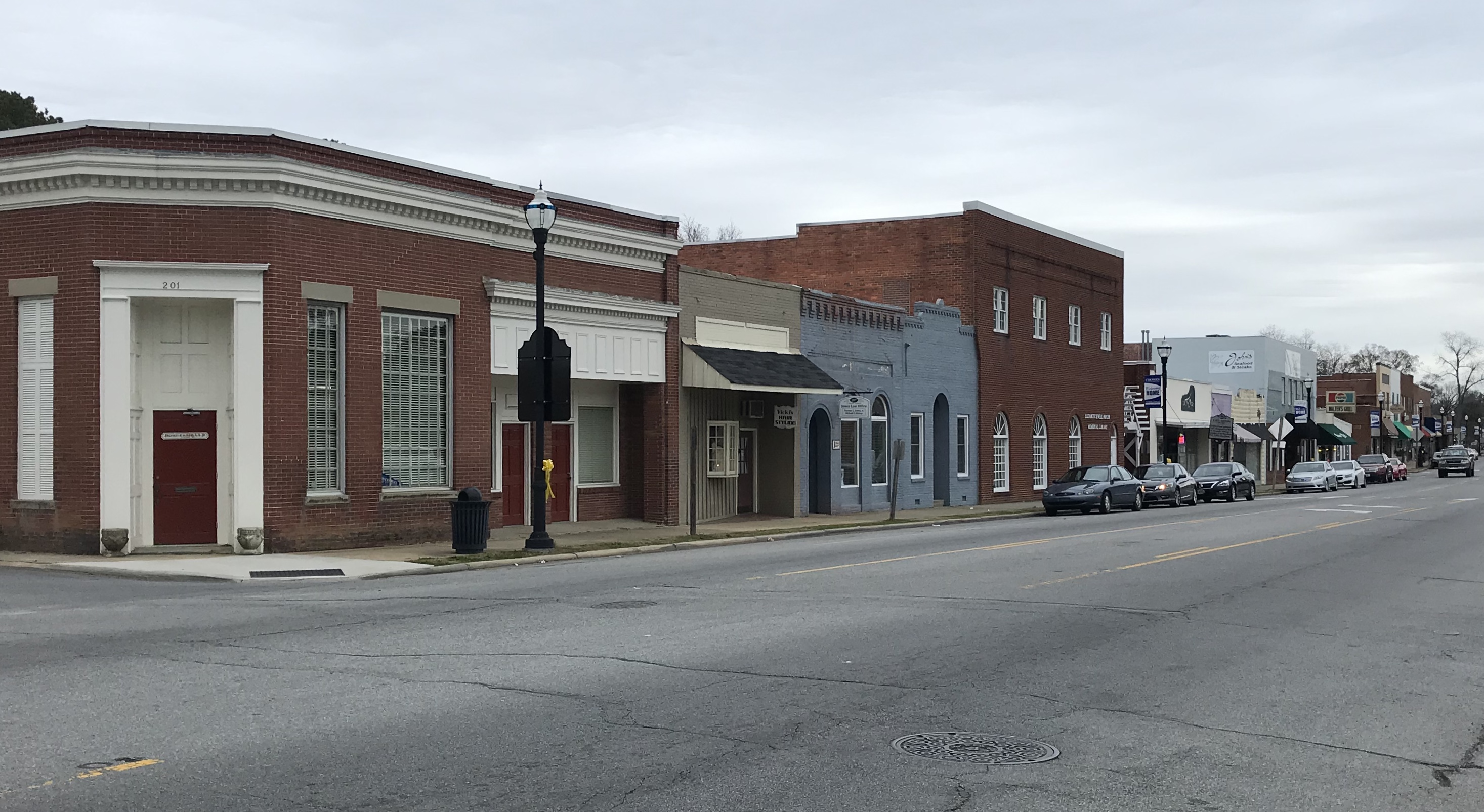
- East Main Street

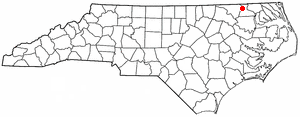
- Location of Murfreesboro, North Carolina
- Coordinates: 36°26′31″N 77°05′48″W
- Country: United States
- State: North Carolina
- County: Hertford

Area
  - Total: 2.32 sq mi (6.01 km^{2})
  - Land: 2.27 sq mi (5.88 km^{2})
  - Water: 0.050 sq mi (0.13 km^{2})
- Elevation: 79 ft (24 m)

Population (2020)
  - Total: 2,619
  - Density: 1,153.8/sq mi (445.48/km^{2})
- Time zone: UTC-5 (Eastern (EST))
  - Summer (DST): UTC-4 (EDT)
- ZIP code: 27855
- Area code: 252
- FIPS code: 37-45640
- GNIS feature ID: 2406219
- Website: www.townofmurfreesboro.com

Murfreesboro is a town in Hertford County, North Carolina, United States. As of the 2020 census, Murfreesboro had a population of 2,619. The town is home to Chowan University.

== Geography ==
Murfreesboro is located in northwestern Hertford County on high ground south of the Meherrin River. U.S. Route 258 runs through the eastern end of the town, and U.S. Route 158 bypasses the town to the south. US-258 leads southwest 51 miles (82 km) to Tarboro and northeast 21 miles (34 km) to Franklin, Virginia, while US-158 leads east 10 miles (16 km) to Winton, the Hertford county seat, and west 37 miles (60 km) to Roanoke Rapids.

According to the United States Census Bureau, the town has a total area of 2.3 square miles (5.9 km^{2}), of which 2.2 square miles (5.8 km^{2}) are land and 0.04 square miles (0.1 km^{2}), or 2.27%, are water.

=== Climate ===
Climate data for Murfreesboro, North Carolina (1991–2020 normals, extremes 1973–present)
Month	Jan	Feb	Mar	Apr	May	Jun	Jul	Aug	Sep	Oct	Nov	Dec	Year
Record high °F (°C)	77 (25)	83 (28)	89 (32)	96 (36)	96 (36)	101 (38)	105 (41)	103 (39)	102 (39)	97 (36)	85 (29)	85 (29)	105 (41)
Mean daily maximum °F (°C)	49.7 (9.8)	53.3 (11.8)	59.8 (15.4)	69.8 (21.0)	76.8 (24.9)	84.2 (29.0)	87.7 (30.9)	85.7 (29.8)	80.7 (27.1)	71.3 (21.8)	61.4 (16.3)	53.4 (11.9)	69.5 (20.8)
Daily mean °F (°C)	39.2 (4.0)	41.9 (5.5)	47.7 (8.7)	57.7 (14.3)	65.8 (18.8)	74.0 (23.3)	77.9 (25.5)	75.9 (24.4)	70.5 (21.4)	59.7 (15.4)	49.4 (9.7)	42.5 (5.8)	58.5 (14.7)
Mean daily minimum °F (°C)	28.7 (−1.8)	30.5 (−0.8)	35.7 (2.1)	45.6 (7.6)	54.7 (12.6)	63.9 (17.7)	68.1 (20.1)	66.1 (18.9)	60.2 (15.7)	48.1 (8.9)	37.5 (3.1)	31.7 (−0.2)	47.6 (8.7)
Record low °F (°C)	−7 (−22)	−5 (−21)	13 (−11)	23 (−5)	32 (0)	42 (6)	48 (9)	43 (6)	36 (2)	23 (−5)	11 (−12)	1 (−17)	−7 (−22)
Average precipitation inches (mm)	3.72 (94)	2.81 (71)	3.88 (99)	3.50 (89)	3.97 (101)	4.99 (127)	5.52 (140)	5.64 (143)	5.11 (130)	3.82 (97)	3.20 (81)	3.47 (88)	49.63 (1,261)
Average snowfall inches (cm)	0.6 (1.5)	0.4 (1.0)	0.0 (0.0)	0.0 (0.0)	0.0 (0.0)	0.0 (0.0)	0.0 (0.0)	0.0 (0.0)	0.0 (0.0)	0.0 (0.0)	0.0 (0.0)	1.6 (4.1)	2.6 (6.6)
Average precipitation days (≥ 0.01 in)	10.3	8.4	9.4	8.3	10.1	10.1	9.6	9.4	9.3	8.2	7.9	9.5	110.5
Average snowy days (≥ 0.1 in)	0.5	0.3	0.0	0.0	0.0	0.0	0.0	0.0	0.0	0.0	0.0	0.3	1.1
Source: NOAA

== Demographics ==
Historical population
Census	Pop.	Note	%±
1860	466		—
1870	753		61.6%
1880	645		−14.3%
1890	674		4.5%
1900	657		−2.5%
1910	809		23.1%
1920	621		−23.2%
1930	1,000		61.0%
1940	1,550		55.0%
1950	2,140		38.1%
1960	2,643		23.5%
1970	4,418		67.2%
1980	3,007		−31.9%
1990	2,580		−14.2%
2000	2,045		−20.7%
2010	2,835		38.6%
2020	2,619		−7.6%
U.S. Decennial Census

=== Racial and ethnic composition ===
Murfreesboro town, North Carolina – Racial and ethnic composition Note: the US Census treats Hispanic/Latino as an ethnic category. This table excludes Latinos from the racial categories and assigns them to a separate category. Hispanics/Latinos may be of any race.
Race / Ethnicity (NH = Non-Hispanic)	Pop 2000	Pop 2010	Pop 2020	% 2000	% 2010	% 2020
White alone (NH)	1,216	1,245	939	59.46%	43.92%	35.85%
Black or African American alone (NH)	761	1,424	1,346	37.21%	50.23%	51.39%
Native American or Alaska Native alone (NH)	10	7	3	0.49%	0.25%	0.11%
Asian alone (NH)	5	27	19	0.24%	0.95%	0.73%
Native Hawaiian or Pacific Islander alone (NH)	0	1	0	0.00%	0.04%	0.00%
Other race alone (NH)	0	19	26	0.00%	0.67%	0.99%
Mixed race or Multiracial (NH)	12	29	68	0.59%	1.02%	2.60%
Hispanic or Latino (any race)	41	83	218	2.00%	2.93%	8.32%
Total	2,045	2,835	2,619	100.00%	100.00%	100.00%

=== 2020 census ===
As of the 2020 census, Murfreesboro had a population of 2,619. The median age was 30.5 years. 16.3% of residents were under the age of 18 and 17.6% of residents were 65 years of age or older. For every 100 females there were 92.6 males, and for every 100 females age 18 and over there were 88.9 males age 18 and over.

0.0% of residents lived in urban areas, while 100.0% lived in rural areas.

There were 938 households and 552 families in Murfreesboro, of which 26.8% had children under the age of 18 living in them. Of all households, 35.9% were married-couple households, 18.8% were households with a male householder and no spouse or partner present, and 40.6% were households with a female householder and no spouse or partner present. About 39.7% of all households were made up of individuals and 19.5% had someone living alone who was 65 years of age or older.

There were 1,069 housing units, of which 12.3% were vacant. The homeowner vacancy rate was 2.7% and the rental vacancy rate was 4.3%.

Racial composition as of the 2020 census
Race	Number	Percent
White	969	37.0%
Black or African American	1,383	52.8%
American Indian and Alaska Native	9	0.3%
Asian	21	0.8%
Native Hawaiian and Other Pacific Islander	0	0.0%
Some other race	145	5.5%
Two or more races	92	3.5%

== History ==
=== Before European settlement ===
The first recorded inhabitants of the area were Native Americans from the Nottoway, Meherrin and Chowanoke tribes.

The first European known to visit the area was John White of the Roanoke Colony in the 16th century. It was also visited by an expedition from Jamestown, Virginia, in the 17th century.

The last native inhabitants, the Chowanoke, were expelled after warring with the English in 1675 and 1676. After that, they were moved to a reservation east of the Chowan River in what is now Gates County.

=== Colonial era to the American Revolution ===
The first known deed to property in the area is a land grant dated November 5, 1714, made to Henry Wheeler for a tract on the Meherrin River which included what is now Murfreesboro. Several other transactions quickly followed, and in 1735 Joseph Parker founded the Meherrin Church. It is the second-oldest Baptist church in North Carolina (now known as Meherrin Baptist Church).

On May 27, 1746, James Jordon Scott sold 150 acres (0.61 km^{2}) on the Meherrin River (part of Wheeler's original grant) to an Irish immigrant, William Murfree from Nansemond County, Virginia. On December 12, 1754, the General Assembly designated Murfree's Landing as a King's Landing, where imports and exports would be inspected by a representative of the King.

=== Revolution to the American Civil War ===
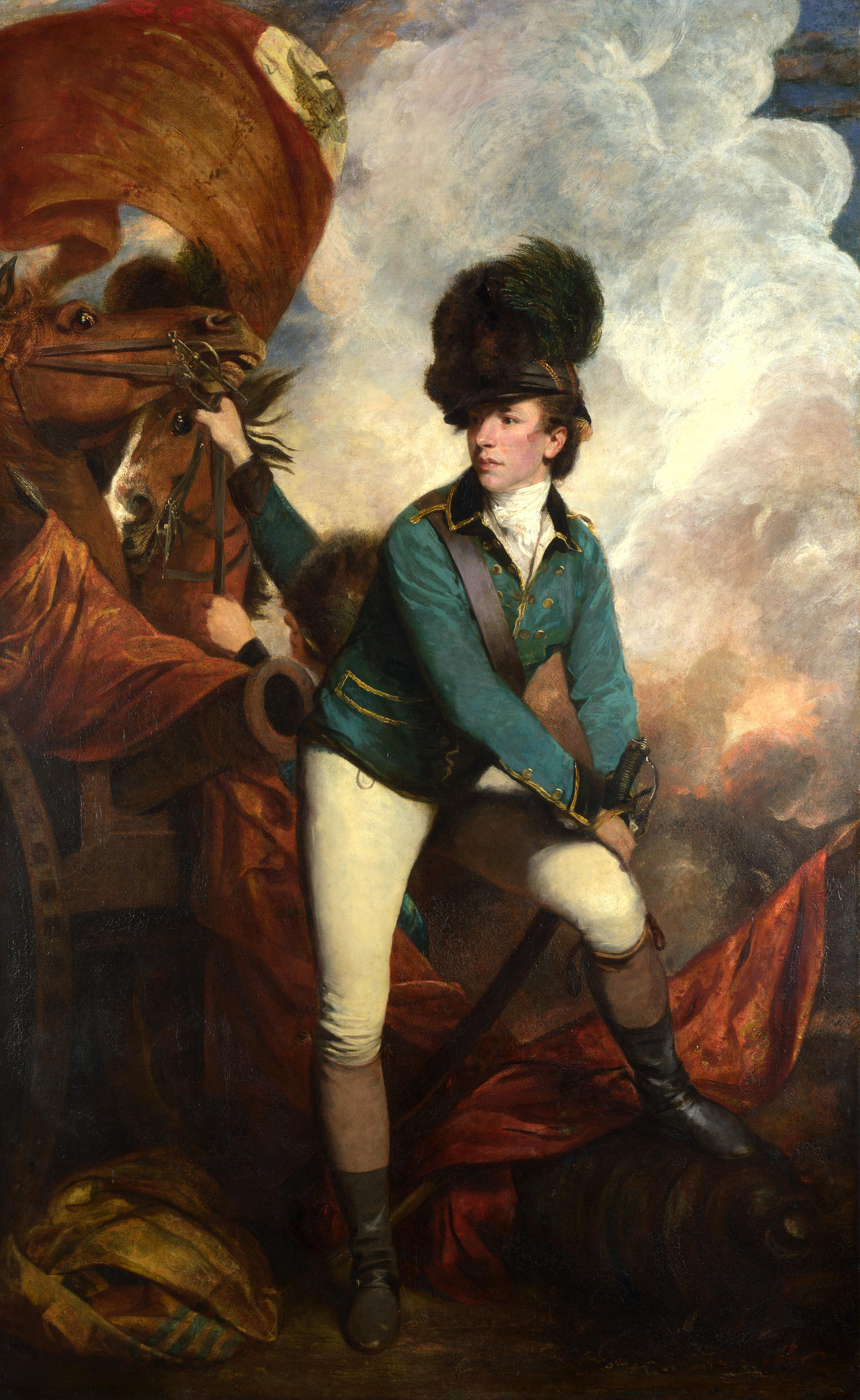
Portrait of Banastre Tarleton by Sir Joshua Reynolds

On July 17, 1781, British forces led by Banastre Tarleton and the British Legion attacked Maney's Neck near Murfree's Landing. William Murfree's son, Hardy Murfree, led a local militia that repulsed the attack at Skinner's Bridge.

William Murfree contributed 97 acres (39 ha) of land surrounding Murfree's Landing in 1787 to the growing settlement to form a town. The town was chartered by the General Assembly and renamed Murfreesboro on January 6, 1787. This act also provided for the establishment of a public dock, as the town was located at the northernmost point of navigation on the Meherrin River.

Murfreesboro was designated by the US Congress in 1790 as an official port of entry, and the customs records indicate a profitable three-cornered trade with New England and the West Indies.

In 1809, the Hertford Academy was established in Murfreesboro, opening in 1811 for male students. In 1814, Harriet Sketchly and Martha Sketchly arrived and expanded the female department of the academy considerably. By 1849, it was renamed as the Chowan Baptist Female Institute, the forerunner of Chowan University.

In 1831 Murfreesboro was among towns that sent armed forces (these were led by Captain Solon Borland) to Southampton County, Virginia, to quell Nat Turner's slave rebellion. As a result of these events, Virginia and North Carolina reduced the rights of free blacks, prohibiting education of both free blacks and slaves.

== Education ==
Riverview Elementary School and Hertford County Middle School, both of which are part of the Hertford County Public Schools system.

Chowan University, a small Baptist university, is located in Murfreesboro.

== Commerce ==
Murfreesboro is no longer an active port. The last commercial vessel to operate on a regular basis was a Texaco Oil barge; it ceased service to the town in October 1966.

The town is served by the Roanoke-Chowan News-Herald newspaper, which is based in nearby Ahoskie.

== Attractions ==
Numerous buildings of the town, mostly grand houses, are on the National Register of Historic Places: the David A. Barnes House, The Cedars, The Columns, Cowper-Thompson House, Freeman House, Melrose, Myrick House, Myrick-Yeates-Vaughan House, Francis Parker House, William Rea Store, Roberts-Vaughan House, and John Wheeler House. In addition, Princeton Site and the Murfreesboro Historic District are listed on the NRHP.

The John Wheeler House is identified as the birthplace of John Hill Wheeler, a planter and politician who served as Minister to Nicaragua and North Carolina State Treasurer. In 2013 it was established that Hannah Bond, a slave who escaped to the North and wrote The Bondwoman's Narrative under the name of Hannah Crafts, had been held by him as a domestic servant. She escaped around 1857 from his plantation and wrote her manuscript on paper traced to his library. It was found in the early 21st century, authenticated and published for the first time in 2002 as the first known novel by an African-American woman.

The old Murfreesboro public school (which housed grades 1 – 12 until 1972) has been redeveloped as the Brady C. Jefcoat Museum. It houses the collections of Brady Jefcoat, a Raleigh native. It includes hundreds of well-preserved ordinary items from the late 19th and early 20th century, including functional phonographs, radios, washing machines, and agricultural implements, as well as a wide variety of other novelties.

== Notable people ==
- William Hill Brown, author of the first American novel
- Tim Cofield, former NFL and CFL linebacker
- Sallie Southall Cotten, writer and clubwoman
- Curtis Deloatch, former NFL cornerback
- Khalid Sheikh Mohammed, an Al Qaeda leader, attended Chowan University in 1983
- Hardy Murfree, lieutenant colonel from North Carolina during the American Revolutionary War
- Julian Myrick, insurance salesman and promoter of tennis
- William N. H. Smith, Democratic congressman and North Carolina Supreme Court justice
- Dwight Stephenson, former NFL center, 5x First Team All-Pro selection and member of the Pro Football Hall of Fame
- Fred Vinson, former NBA player and current coach
- John H. Wheeler, first United States ambassador to Nicaragua and head of the United States Mint

== See also ==
- Roanoke-Chowan Pork-Fest
- North Carolina Watermelon Festival
- Chowan University
