= Hertford County, North Carolina =

County in North Carolina, United States

- County
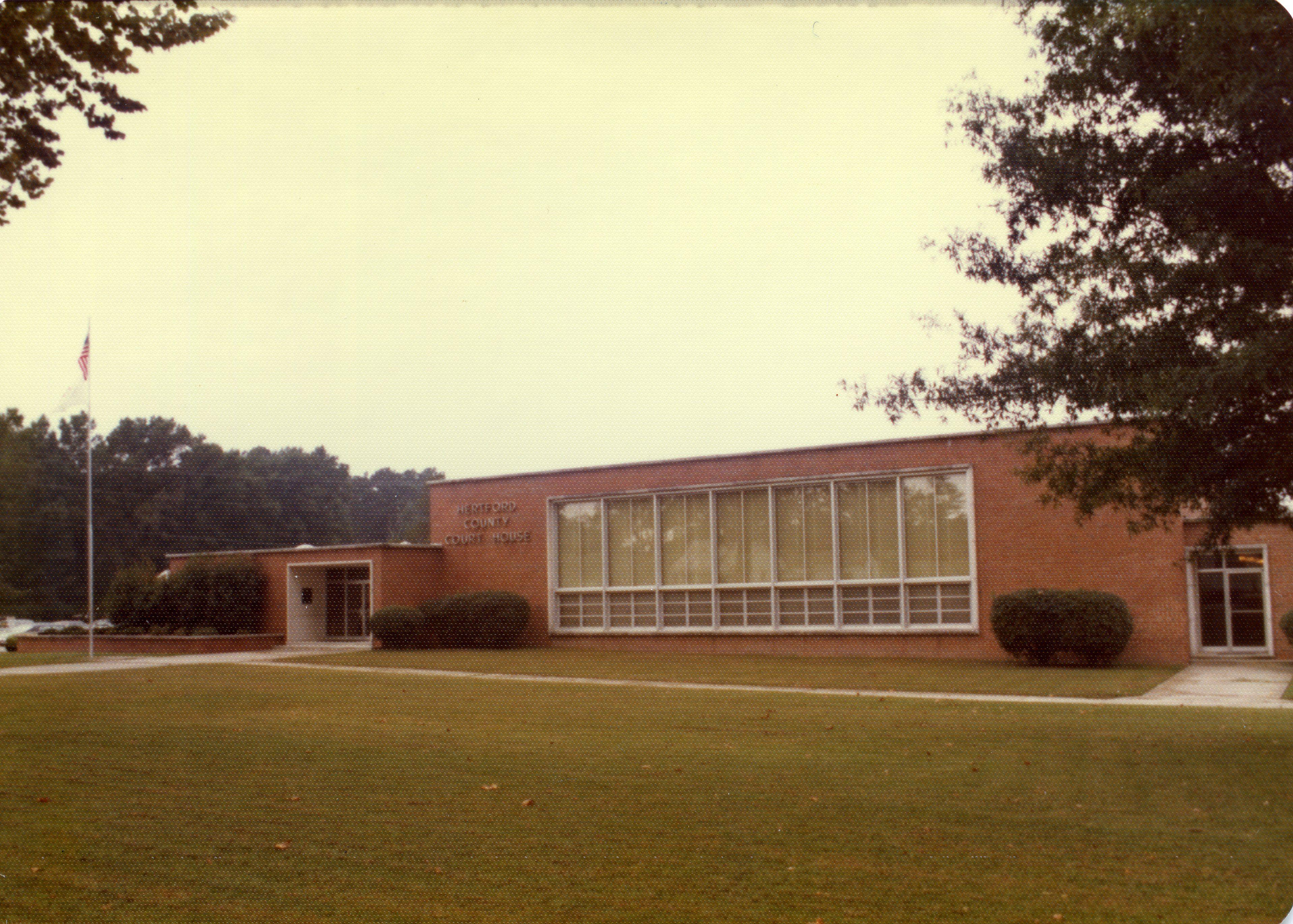
- Hertford County Courthouse in Winton

- Flag Seal

- Location within the U.S. state of North Carolina
- Interactive map of Hertford County, North Carolina
- Coordinates: 36.36°N 76.98°W
- Country: United States
- State: North Carolina
- Founded: 1759
- Named for: Francis Seymour-Conway, 1st Marquess of Hertford
- Seat: Winton
- Largest community: Ahoskie

Area
  - Total: 360.40 sq mi (933.4 km^{2})
  - Land: 353.16 sq mi (914.7 km^{2})
  - Water: 7.24 sq mi (18.8 km^{2}) 2.01%

Population (2020)
  - Total: 21,552
  - Estimate (2025): 19,015 ▼
  - Density: 61.03/sq mi (23.56/km^{2})
- Time zone: UTC−5 (Eastern)
  - Summer (DST): UTC−4 (EDT)
- Congressional district: 1st
- Website: www.hertfordcountync.gov

Hertford County is a county located in the U.S. state of North Carolina. As of the 2020 census, the population was 21,552. Its county seat is Winton. It is classified within the region known in the 21st century as the Inner Banks.

== History ==
Hertford County is home of the Meherrin Indian Tribe, descendants of indigenous people who had inhabited the region for many centuries. After decades of encroachment by English colonists, the Tribe moved south from Virginia, where they settled in 1706 on a reservation abandoned by the Chowanoke. This six-square-mile reservation was at Parker's Ferry near the mouth of the Meherrin River. It was confirmed by a treaty of 1726. However, they were not able to keep the reservation lands.

European explorers and surveyors visited the land in the late 1500s and 1600s. The first land grant to a European settler dates to 1703. Early settlers were of English, Scottish, Scotch-Irish, Irish, and French descent. They introduced a plantation system of agriculture. Between the eventual communities of Winton, Ahoskie, and Cofield, a community of nonwhite people arose in what would eventually be dubbed the Winton Triangle. The first recorded nonwhite landowner in the area dates to the 1740s.

A new county was first proposed by Representative John Campbell of the North Carolina colonial legislature on December 12, 1758, when he presented the body with a petition from area residents who were frustrated by the distances they had to travel to attend court sessions. Representative Benjamin Wynns introduced another bill in 1759 following the presentation of a second petition and it was passed and ratified as law on December 19, 1759, creating Hertford County from parts of Bertie County, Chowan County, and Northampton County, effective May 1, 1760. It was named for Francis Seymour-Conway, Marquess of Hertford. The county court convened at Cotton's Ferry until the town of Winton was incorporated upon land gifted by Wynns and designated the seat of government in 1766, and a courthouse was subsequently constructed. In 1764, the border between Hertford and Northampton was slightly altered. In 1779, parts of Hertford County were combined with parts of Chowan County and Perquimans County to form Gates County. In 1830 the original courthouse was burned, but was subsequently rebuilt.

Hertford's economy prospered in the Antebellum period, underpinned by slavery-supported agriculture and the use of the Meherrin and Chowan rivers as trade routes to southern Virginia. Murfreesboro developed with the construction of several large homes funded by the prosperity. The Chowan Baptist Female Institute was also created in the county in 1841. The 1860 U.S. census recorded the county's population at 9,504 people, of whom 47 percent were enslaved and about 12 percent were free people of color.

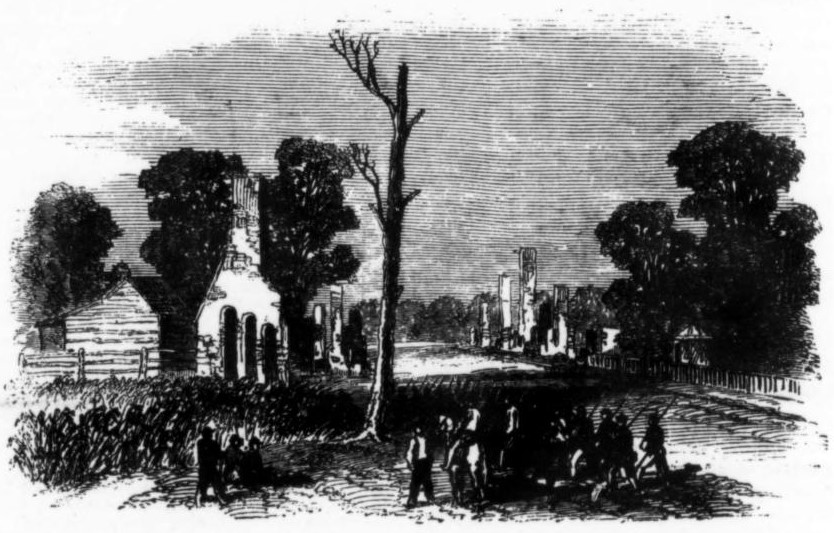
Ruins of Winton c. 1863

During the American Civil War, North Carolina seceded from the United States and joined the Confederate States of America. Men from Hertford County served in several Confederate States Army infantry and cavalry units. Federal forces intervened in eastern North Carolina early in the conflict, and in February 1862 they captured Roanoke Island, exposing territory along the Chowan River vulnerable to further penetration. Federal gunboats were subsequently dispatched up the river to destroy rail bridges north of Winton but were repulsed in an ambush by Confederate artillery. The following day federal troops landed at Winton and set most of its buildings ablaze, including the county courthouse, leading to the loss of numerous official county records and documents. Confederate forces remained active in the vicinity of Murfreesboro, but through the remainder of the war federal gunboats were active on the Chowan River and Unionist raiders moved through the countryside, disrupting the county's economic and social life.

After the war, Winton slowly rebuilt, with a new courthouse erected in 1870. The county's economy continued to be based in agriculture, though it underwent changes. The abolition of slavery led to the adoption of a tenant farming system and increasing emphasis was placed on the cotton cash crop, leading to a decline in subsistence farming. Peanut cultivation was introduced in about 1880 and eventually overtook cotton production. The local lumber and fishing industries grew in importance in the latter portion of the 19th century. In 1877, a small portion of Bertie was annexed to Hertford. In 1884, the Atlantic Coast Line Railroad began construction on its Norfolk—Rocky Mount Line, which traveled through the Hertford communities of Ahoskie, Cofield, and Tunis. The railroad fueled growth in Ahoskie, drawing industry and leading it to surpass Winton as the county's most economically significant town.

In 1907, Hertford County's boundary with Northampton County was further delineated by state law. Damage to cotton crops by the boll weevil in the early 1900s led the county's agricultural sector to diversify into livestock as well as tobacco and the production of fruits and vegetables. In the 1950s, the county government invested in the construction of new facilities, including the erection of a new courthouse in 1956.

== Geography ==
According to the U.S. Census Bureau, the county has a total area of 360.40 square miles (933.4 km^{2}), of which 353.16 square miles (914.7 km^{2}) is land and 7.24 square miles (18.8 km^{2}) (2.01%) is water.

=== State and local protected area ===
- Chowan Swamp Game Land (part)

=== Major water bodies ===
- Ahoskie River
- Cutawhiskie Creek
- Chowan River
- Indian Creek
- Meherrin River
- Panther Creek
- Potecasi Creek
- Tukey Creek
- Wiccacon River

=== Adjacent counties ===
- Southampton County, Virginia – north
- Gates County – east
- Chowan County – southeast
- Bertie County – south
- Northampton County – west

=== Major highways ===
- US 13
- US 158
- US 158 Bus.
- US 258
- NC 11
- NC 35
- NC 42
- NC 45
- NC 305
- NC 461
- NC 561

=== Major infrastructure ===
- Parker's Ferry, river ferry across the Meherrin River

== Demographics ==
Historical population
Census	Pop.	Note	%±
1790	5,949		—
1800	6,701		12.6%
1810	6,052		−9.7%
1820	7,712		27.4%
1830	8,537		10.7%
1840	7,484		−12.3%
1850	8,142		8.8%
1860	9,504		16.7%
1870	9,273		−2.4%
1880	11,843		27.7%
1890	13,851		17.0%
1900	14,294		3.2%
1910	15,436		8.0%
1920	16,294		5.6%
1930	17,542		7.7%
1940	19,352		10.3%
1950	21,453		10.9%
1960	22,718		5.9%
1970	23,529		3.6%
1980	23,368		−0.7%
1990	22,523		−3.6%
2000	22,601		0.3%
2010	24,669		9.2%
2020	21,552		−12.6%
2025 (est.)	19,015	▼	−11.8%
U.S. Decennial Census; 1790–1960 1900–1990; 1990–2000 2010 2020

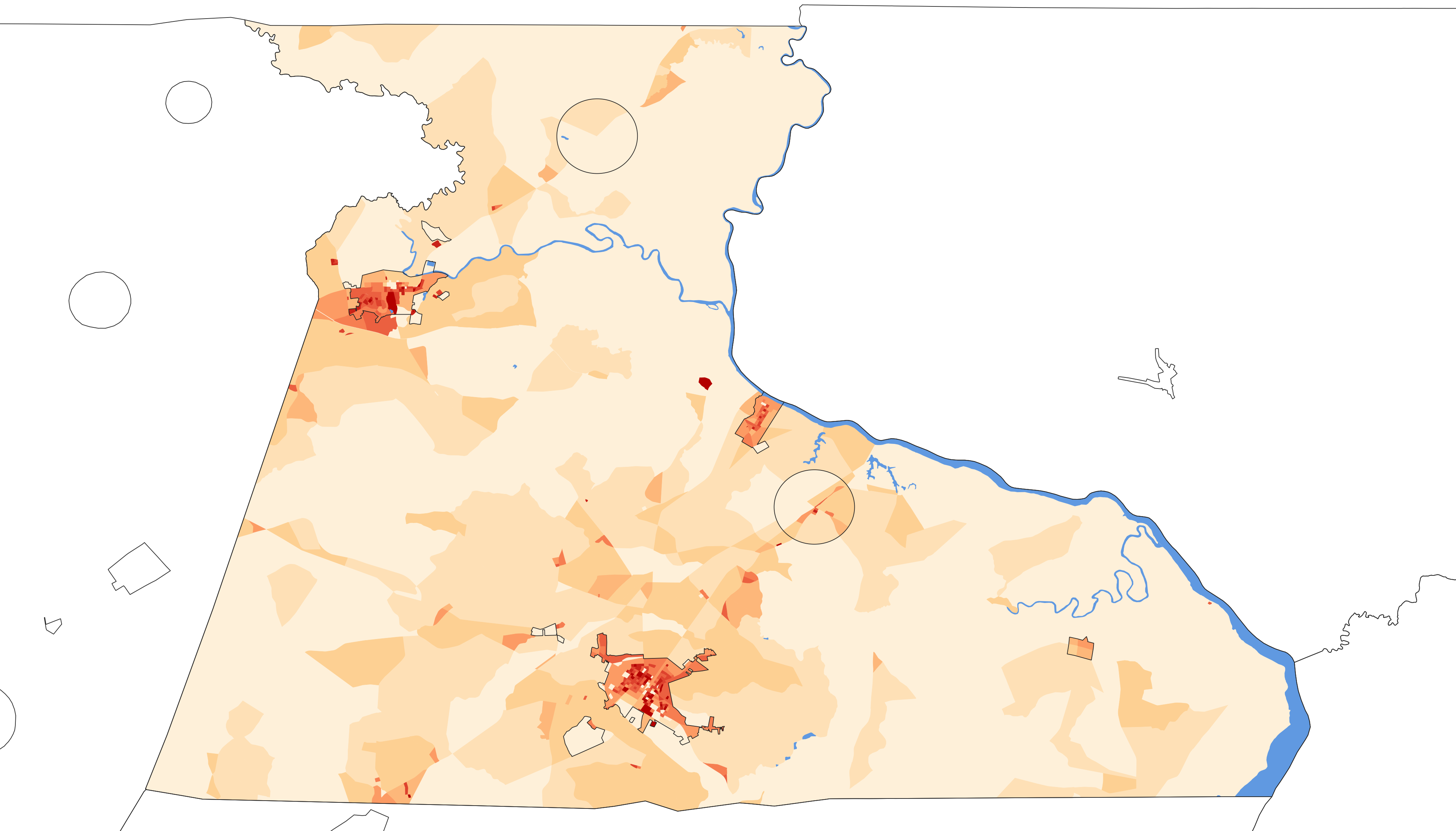
2020 population density of Hertford County NC by census block

=== 2020 census ===
Hertford County, North Carolina – Racial and ethnic composition Note: the US Census treats Hispanic/Latino as an ethnic category. This table excludes Latinos from the racial categories and assigns them to a separate category. Hispanics/Latinos may be of any race.
Race / Ethnicity (NH = Non-Hispanic)	Pop 1980	Pop 1990	Pop 2000	Pop 2010	Pop 2020	% 1980	% 1990	% 2000	% 2010	% 2020
White alone (NH)	10,248	9,172	8,374	8,479	6,721	43.85%	40.72%	37.05%	34.37%	31.19%
Black or African American alone (NH)	12,646	12,952	13,375	14,845	12,215	54.12%	57.51%	59.18%	60.18%	56.68%
Native American or Alaska Native alone (NH)	148	219	264	271	188	0.63%	0.97%	1.17%	1.10%	0.87%
Asian alone (NH)	35	94	69	127	113	0.15%	0.42%	0.31%	0.51%	0.52%
Native Hawaiian or Pacific Islander alone (NH)	x	x	1	1	3	x	x	0.00%	0.00%	0.01%
Other race alone (NH)	54	5	19	46	99	0.23%	0.02%	0.08%	0.19%	0.46%
Mixed race or Multiracial (NH)	x	x	145	256	634	x	x	0.64%	1.04%	2.94%
Hispanic or Latino (any race)	237	81	354	644	1,579	1.01%	0.36%	1.57%	2.61%	7.33%
Total	23,368	22,523	22,601	24,669	21,552	100.00%	100.00%	100.00%	100.00%	100.00%

As of the 2020 census, there were 21,552 people, 8,351 households, and 5,419 families living in the county. The median age was 43.1 years, with 18.2% of residents under the age of 18 and 21.3% aged 65 or older. For every 100 females there were 96.8 males, and for every 100 females age 18 and over there were 95.8 males.

The racial makeup of the county was 35.4% White, 57.5% Black or African American, 1.0% American Indian and Alaska Native, 0.6% Asian, <0.1% Native Hawaiian and Pacific Islander, 2.2% from some other race, and 3.4% from two or more races. Hispanic or Latino residents of any race comprised 7.3% of the population.

22.6% of residents lived in urban areas, while 77.4% lived in rural areas.

There were 8,351 households in the county, of which 25.4% had children under the age of 18 living in them. Of all households, 36.3% were married-couple households, 19.6% were households with a male householder and no spouse or partner present, and 39.2% were households with a female householder and no spouse or partner present. About 35.2% of all households were made up of individuals and 16.8% had someone living alone who was 65 years of age or older.

There were 9,803 housing units, of which 14.8% were vacant. Among occupied housing units, 62.9% were owner-occupied and 37.1% were renter-occupied. The homeowner vacancy rate was 1.7% and the rental vacancy rate was 7.8%.

=== 2010 census ===
At the 2010 census, there were 24,669 people, 8,953 households, and 6,240 families residing in the county. The population density was 64 people per square mile (25 people/km^{2}). There were 9,724 housing units at an average density of 28 units per square mile (11 units/km^{2}). The racial makeup of the county was 60.5% Black or African American, 35.6% White, 1.1% Native American, 0.5% Asian, 0.0% Pacific Islander, 0.8% from other races, and 1.0% from two or more races. 1.4% of the population were Hispanic or Latino of any race.

There were 8,953 households, out of which 30.00% had children under the age of 18 living with them, 45.80% were married couples living together, 19.50% had a female householder with no husband present, and 30.30% were non-families. 26.90% of all households were made up of individuals, and 12.10% had someone living alone who was 65 years of age or older. The average household size was 2.48 and the average family size was 2.99.

In the county, the population was spread out, with 25.30% under the age of 18, 7.80% from 18 to 24, 26.30% from 25 to 44, 24.80% from 45 to 64, and 15.80% who were 65 years of age or older. The median age was 39 years. For every 100 females there were 85.00 males. For every 100 females age 18 and over, there were 79.50 males.

The median income for a household in the county was $26,422, and the median income for a family was $32,002. Males had a median income of $26,730 versus $20,144 for females. The per capita income for the county was $15,641. About 15.90% of families and 18.30% of the population were below the poverty line, including 21.30% of those under age 18 and 21.00% of those age 65 or over.

== Government and politics ==
Hertford County is a member of the Mid-East Commission regional council of governments.

As of October 2022, 66 percent of registered voters in Hertford County are Democrats—the highest Democratic registration rate statewide—while Republicans have their lowest county registration rate.

Rivers Correctional Institution, a private prison operated by the GEO Group which operates under contract from the Federal Bureau of Prisons and houses many felons who committed crimes in Washington, DC, is 1 mile (1.6 km) from Winton.

United States presidential election results for Hertford County, North Carolina
Year	Republican		Democratic		Third party(ies)	
Year	No.	%	No.	%	No.	%
1912	61	6.72%	742	81.72%	105	11.56%
1916	209	17.61%	977	82.31%	1	0.08%
1920	221	16.68%	1,104	83.32%	0	0.00%
1924	164	14.92%	932	84.80%	3	0.27%
1928	393	27.62%	1,030	72.38%	0	0.00%
1932	88	4.56%	1,835	95.08%	7	0.36%
1936	84	3.48%	2,327	96.52%	0	0.00%
1940	92	3.60%	2,464	96.40%	0	0.00%
1944	125	5.89%	1,996	94.11%	0	0.00%
1948	196	8.04%	2,165	88.80%	77	3.16%
1952	579	16.84%	2,859	83.16%	0	0.00%
1956	729	21.21%	2,708	78.79%	0	0.00%
1960	781	20.10%	3,105	79.90%	0	0.00%
1964	994	20.09%	3,953	79.91%	0	0.00%
1968	1,125	17.04%	3,275	49.60%	2,203	33.36%
1972	2,794	58.34%	1,928	40.26%	67	1.40%
1976	1,517	27.53%	3,986	72.34%	7	0.13%
1980	1,854	30.59%	4,102	67.69%	104	1.72%
1984	3,176	41.27%	4,498	58.45%	21	0.27%
1988	2,977	37.54%	4,943	62.33%	10	0.13%
1992	2,208	28.78%	4,609	60.08%	855	11.14%
1996	1,823	25.86%	4,856	68.89%	370	5.25%
2000	2,382	30.16%	5,484	69.44%	31	0.39%
2004	2,942	36.18%	5,141	63.22%	49	0.60%
2008	3,089	29.00%	7,513	70.54%	48	0.45%
2012	3,007	27.54%	7,843	71.84%	68	0.62%
2016	3,099	30.42%	6,910	67.84%	177	1.74%
2020	3,479	32.72%	7,097	66.74%	58	0.55%
2024	3,561	36.18%	6,191	62.90%	91	0.92%

== Economy ==
Hertford County benefits from a larger industrial presence than some of its neighboring counties. Several large employers are located in Hertford County, including a privately run federal prison, Chowan University, a Nucor steel mill, several Perdue poultry processing facilities, an aluminum extrusion facility in Winton, and a lumber-processing facility in Ahoskie. These industries, combined with a typical range of local retail, restaurant and service businesses, combine to give Hertford County one of the lowest unemployment rates in Northeastern North Carolina. The larger area has historically lagged behind the rest of the state in terms of economic development.

== Education ==
Hertford County Public Schools, the sole school district covering the county, has seven schools ranging from pre-kindergarten to twelfth grade. These include three high schools (the main high school being Hertford County High School), one middle school, and three elementary schools. The North Carolina Department of Public Instruction rated the county school system as "low-performing" for the 2021–2022 school year.

== Media ==
Hertford County is served by the Roanoke-Chowan News-Herald newspaper. There are five radio stations in Hertford County: WDLZ FM 98.3, an Adult Contemporary radio station and WWDR AM 1080, an Adult Urban Contemporary radio station, are located in Murfreesboro. WQDK FM 99.3, a Country Music radio station and WRCS AM 970, an Urban Gospel radio station, are located in Ahoskie. WBKU FM 91.7, a non-commercial, Contemporary Christian Music radio station which also broadcasts programming from the American Family Radio network, is located in Ahoskie.

== Communities ==
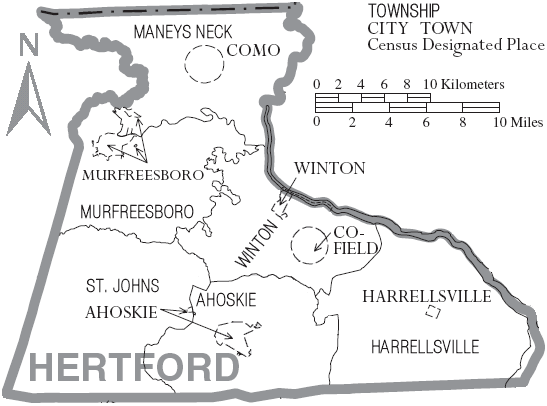
Map of Hertford County with municipal and township labels

=== Towns ===
- Ahoskie (largest community)
- Como
- Harrellsville
- Murfreesboro
- Winton (county seat)

=== Village ===
- Cofield

=== Unincorporated communities ===
- Menola
- Millennium

=== Townships ===
- Ahoskie
- Harrellsville
- Maneys Neck
- Murfreesboro
- St. John's
- Winton

== See also ==
- List of counties in North Carolina
- National Register of Historic Places listings in Hertford County, North Carolina

== Works cited ==
- Corbitt, David Leroy (2000). The formation of the North Carolina counties, 1663-1943 (reprint ed.). Raleigh: North Carolina Division of Archives and History. OCLC 46398241.
- Grimsley, Mark (1995). The Hard Hand of War: Union Military Policy Toward Southern Civilians, 1861-1865 (revised ed.). Cambridge University Press. ISBN 9780521599412.
- Harrell, Roger H. (2011). The 2nd North Carolina Cavalry (reprint ed.). Jefferson, North Carolina: McFarland. ISBN 9780786467747.
- Parramore, Thomas C. (1962). "The Burning of Winton In 1862". The North Carolina Historical Review. 39 (1): 18–31. JSTOR 23517317.
