= Leslie Boney =

American architect

Leslie N. Boney Sr. (1880–1964) was an American architect who focused on schools. He designed approximately 1,000 schools or additions to schools, and his works appear in 51 of North Carolina's 100 counties.

He partnered with William J. Wilkins during 1919 to 1920.

A number of his works are listed on the U.S. National Register of Historic Places.

His sons, Charlie Boney and Leslie N. Boney Jr. were also architects who had an important role in the modernist movement of North Carolina in the mid-1900s.

Works include (with attribution):

- Ahoskie School, built 1929, 105 N. Academy St., Ahoskie, North Carolina (Boney, Leslie N.; Mooney, C.B.), NRHP-listed
- Executive Office Building of the Grand Lodge of Ancient Free & Accepted Masons of North Carolina, 2921 Glenwood Avenue, Raleigh, North Carolina. Built 1955-56.
- Leslie N. Boney House, built in 1925, 425 S. 3rd Street, Wilmington, North Carolina, a Georgian Revival brick house
- Additions to the Central School, Laurinburg, North Carolina, NRHP-listed
- Gaston School (Gaston, North Carolina), 200 School St., Gaston, North Carolina (Boney, Leslie N.), NRHP-listed
- B. F. Grady School, N side NC 11, 0.3 mi. W of jct. with NC 111, Kornegay, North Carolina (Boney, Leslie Sr.), NRHP-listed
- Cafeteria building at the Granite Quarry School, 706 Dunn's Mountain Rd., Granite Quarry, North Carolina, NRHP-listed
- Henrietta-Caroleen High School, 2527 NC 221A, Mooresboro, North Carolina (Boney, Leslie N.), NRHP-listed
- Taylor Farm, 337 Comfort Rd., Richlands, North Carolina (Boney, Leslie N.), NRHP-listed
- One or more works in LaGrange Historic District, roughly bounded by N. Caswell, E. James, N. Carey, E. Washington, S. Caswell, W. Washington, and Forbes Sts., LaGrange, North Carolina (Boney, Leslie N.), NRHP-listed
- One or more works in Snow Hill Historic District (Boundary Increase), W. Harper St. between W. 6th St. and W. 4th St., Snow Hill, North Carolina (Boney, Leslie), NRHP-listed
- One or more works in Wallace Commercial Historic District, roughly bounded by Southerland, College, Boney and Raleigh Sts., Wallace, North Carolina (Boney, Leslie N. Sr.), NRHP-listed
- One or more works in Wilmington Historic District (Boundary Increase), roughly bounded by Harnett, 7th, 3rd, Howard; Campbell, 9th, 12th, Princess; Dock, Castle 8th, 14th; 9th, Wright, Greenfield, Wilmington, North Carolina (Boney, Leslie N. Sr.), NRHP-listed
