= Northampton County High School – West =

Former high school in North Carolina

Coordinates: 36.5108°N 77.6524°W

Location
- 152 Hurricane Dr; Gaston, North Carolina 27832; United States

Information
- Established: 1982
- Closed: 2012 (merged to become Northampton County High School)
- Colors: Navy Blue, Gray, and White

Northampton County High School – West was a public high school located in Gaston, North Carolina.

== Overview ==
The school colors were navy blue, grey and white, and their team name was the Hurricanes. The school was usually referred to as "West" by many students and community members.

== History ==
Northampton County High School–West was established in 1982. The school's origins date back to Gumberry High School, which was constructed in the mid-1950s and was located in Gumberry, North Carolina.

In the late 1980s, the district decided to open a new high school which was closer to the portion of Northampton County that borders Lake Gaston. In 1991, the Northampton County School Board opened the doors to a newly constructed Northampton County High School–West.

In the 2004–05 school year, the school was then split into two schools, NCHS–West and NCHS–West STEM. NCHS–West STEM was a science, technology, engineering, math, and freshman academy, that was part of the North Carolina New Schools' Project. NCHS–West consisted of grades 10–12 at that time. In 2009–10 school year, NCHS–West was renamed NCHS–West STEM and included grades 7–12.

In 2012, the school would consolidate with Northampton County High School–East, to form Northampton County High School. The newly consolidated high school moved to what was the NCHS–East campus in Conway, North Carolina.

At the beginning of the 2016–17 school year, Northampton County High School would move to the former NCHS–West campus in Gaston, North Carolina.

== Athletics ==
NCHS–West offered various number of athletic programs. The programs offered included volleyball, basketball, American football, baseball, softball, cheerleading, marching band and pep band. NCHS–West athletics were known primarily for its basketball and football programs, and its band.

The football team went 13–1 in 2006, losing to Manteo High School in the state playoff 1A semi-final round. The football team went 14–2 in 2005, where the team finished as state runner-ups, falling in the 1A state championship game against Elkin High School.
