= Brian Sabean =

American baseball executive (born 1956)

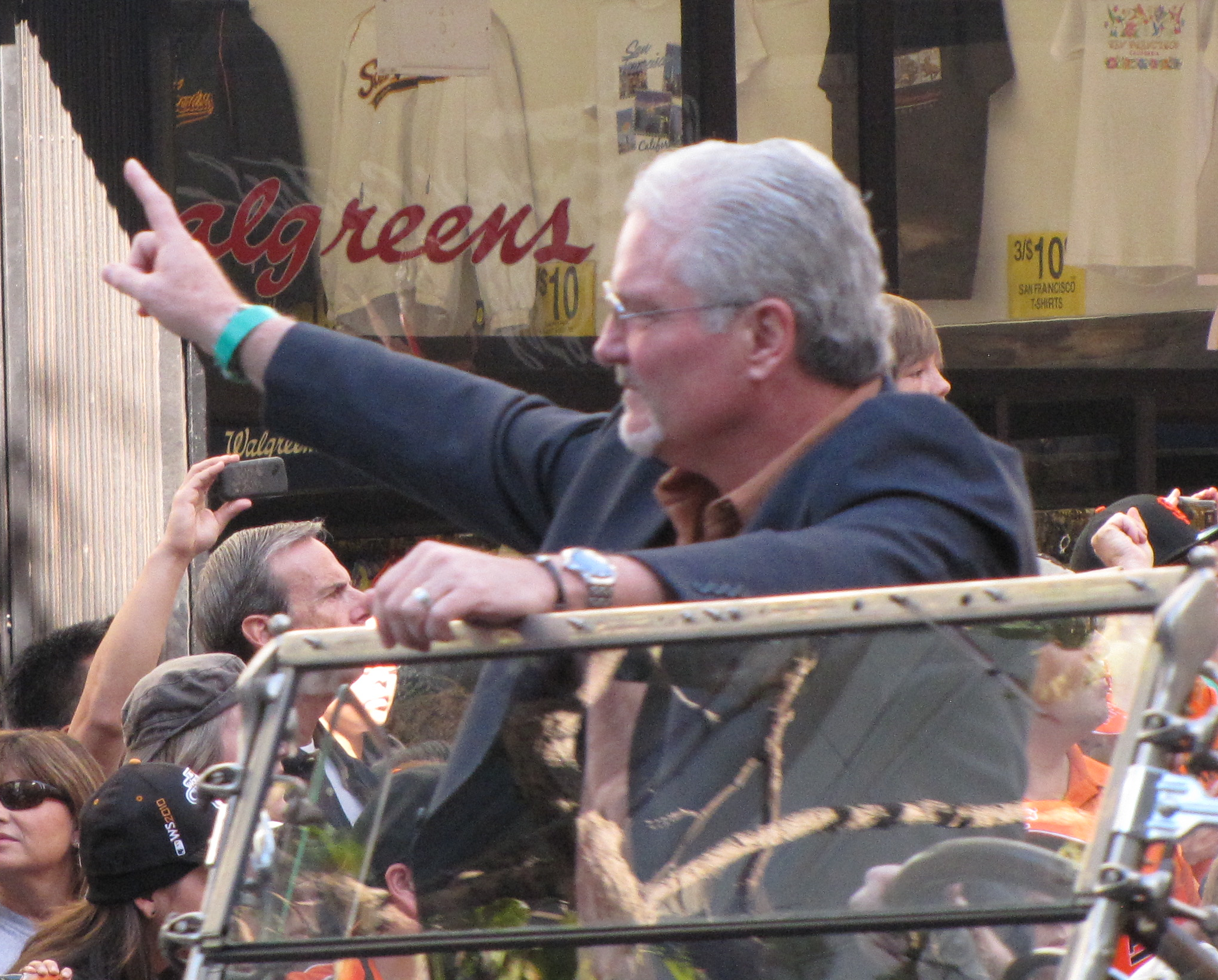
- Executive Advisor to the General Manager
- Born: July 1, 1956 (age 70); Concord, New Hampshire, U.S.

Teams
- San Francisco Giants (1997–2014); New York Yankees (2023–2026)

Career highlights and awards
- 3× World Series champion (2010, 2012, 2014); Executive of the Year (2003)

Brian Roy Sabean (born July 1, 1956), nicknamed "Sabes", is an American baseball executive. He was the executive vice president of baseball operations of the San Francisco Giants. He served as the team's general manager for eighteen seasons, from 1997 to 2014, the longest-tenured general manager in Major League Baseball. He succeeded general manager Bob Quinn. The Giants had a winning record in thirteen of the eighteen seasons in which Sabean served as general manager. Prior to his tenure, the team had suffered losing seasons in five out of six years.

== Early life ==
Brian R. Sabean was born on July 1, 1956, in Concord, New Hampshire. Sabean attended Concord High School, where he excelled in baseball.

== College career ==
Sabean Eckerd College of St. Petersburg, Florida. Sabean played with former Major Leaguer Joe Lefebvre at both schools.

== Managerial career ==
In 1978, Sabean was field manager of the Yarmouth-Dennis Red Sox, a collegiate summer baseball team in the prestigious Cape Cod Baseball League.

== Coaching career ==
Sabean was an assistant baseball coach at Saint Leo University in 1979 and University of Tampa from 1980 to 1982. He was promoted to head coach in 1983 and led Tampa to its first-ever NCAA regional tournament appearance in 1984.

== Baseball career ==
=== New York Yankees ===
Sabean began his involvement in Major League Baseball as a scout for the New York Yankees organization in 1985. Sabean was promoted to director of scouting in 1986 and vice president of player development/scouting in 1990. With the Yankees, he drafted or signed as amateurs the likes of Derek Jeter, Mariano Rivera, J. T. Snow, Jorge Posada and Andy Pettitte.

=== San Francisco Giants ===
Sabean joined the Giants in 1993, serving as assistant to the general manager and vice president of scouting/player personnel. Sabean served one year as senior vice president of player personnel in 1995 before his promotion to general manager in 1996.

==== The 1997 turnaround ====
When Sabean replaced Bob Quinn in 1996, the team was in disarray, finishing last in the National League West with 94 losses. Sabean is often credited for the team's turnaround, but his first major decision was very controversial at the time, trading fan favorite Matt Williams to the Cleveland Indians for José Vizcaíno, Joe Roa, Julián Tavárez and Jeff Kent. Sabean received so much criticism in San Francisco for the trade that he had to defend himself in the media, declaring, "I am not an idiot." The trade looked better in hindsight as Kent tallied over 100 RBIs in each of six seasons with the Giants and was named National League MVP in 2000, while Williams was traded again after one season with the Indians. Sabean also signed free-agent centerfielder Darryl Hamilton and traded for first baseman J. T. Snow, and bolstered the pitching staff with a midseason trade with the Chicago White Sox to acquire three pitchers. In 1997, the Giants won their first N.L. West title since 1989, finishing with a 90–72 record, the first of eight straight winning seasons.

==== Winning seasons: 1997–2004 ====
This eight-year stretch was one of the more successful in Giants franchise history, with the Giants averaging 92 wins per season. During these years, Sabean's strategy was to trade away young prospects for veteran position players while developing the organization's pitching talent. Sabean traded away many prospects that never materialized into major leaguers in exchange for experienced major leaguers during late season pushes toward the playoffs. These trades have included All-Stars Jeff Kent, Jason Schmidt, Robb Nen, Kenny Lofton, Andrés Galarraga, Ellis Burks, Joe Carter, Roberto Hernández, Wilson Álvarez, and José Mesa.

After the Giants narrowly lost the 2002 World Series, Sabean was forced to dramatically retool. The Giants lost several key players, including Jeff Kent, Reggie Sanders, Jay Witasick, David Bell, and Aaron Fultz to free agency. Sabean signed veterans José Cruz Jr., Neifi Pérez, Edgardo Alfonzo, and Ray Durham to replace some of the free agents the Giants lost. He also traded away fan favorite Russ Ortiz (to the Braves for Damian Moss) and Liván Hernández, the losing pitcher of Game 7 of the 2002 World Series. Sabean hired Felipe Alou to replace fan favorite Dusty Baker who became the manager of the Chicago Cubs. Despite these major roster moves, the Giants won 100 games in 2003. Sabean was named Executive of the Year by the Sporting News in 2003, the first time a member of the Giants organization had received that award since Al Rosen in 1987.

The trade of Moss and Kurt Ainsworth for Sidney Ponson, which Sabean arranged late in the 2003 season, was criticized by some Giants fans and columnists. Ponson returned to the Orioles after only a few months on the Giants, during which he posted a 3–6 record and 3.71 ERA in the regular season, and one poor start in the postseason. In addition, as time went on, Sabean's trade of Francisco Liriano, Boof Bonser, and Joe Nathan for A. J. Pierzynski at the end of the 2003 season drew more criticism. He signed Michael Tucker to a free agent contract just before the deadline to declare arbitration making him an obvious inclusion for a team that would otherwise have passed in the Kansas City Royals. This cost the Giants a compensation draft pick that would not have been sacrificed had Sabean waited a few more hours to sign Tucker. Pierzynski remained on the Giants for one year, while Nathan developed into one of baseball's premier closers. Liriano became an All-Star in 2006, his rookie season, though he suffered injury later that year and would not be a productive starter until 2010.

After the Giants narrowly missed the playoffs in 2004, fans began to criticize Sabean for his player personnel moves. Sabean continued to build a team of veterans around Barry Bonds but some of them began to achieve below expectations. Edgardo Alfonzo did not put up the same offensive numbers as he did when he was with the New York Mets. Second baseman Ray Durham spent more time on the disabled list than he had previously in his career. In 2004, the Giants had not developed a homegrown position player since 2000. Sabean defended himself in a press conference, dismissing his critics as a "lunatic fringe". Some fans took up "lunatic fringe" as a rallying cry, printing up T-shirts with the phrase and wearing them to the ballpark.

Still, the 1997–2004 stretch was still a very successful time in Giants history with eight straight winning seasons. That time period overlapped with the Giants moving into Pacific Bell Park in downtown San Francisco. Because the ballpark was privately financed, the Giants were dependent on high attendance rates to pay their mortgage and remained in constant "win-now" mode.

==== Losing seasons: 2005–2008 ====
Prior to the 2004 season, Sabean faced some criticism for his offseason moves, especially for not signing a closer to replace the injured Robb Nen and the departing Tim Worrell, and for not signing a power hitter to protect Barry Bonds in the lineup. The critics' concerns were borne out as Matt Herges struggled in the closer role, and without protection, Barry Bonds set single-season records with 232 walks and 120 intentional walks. Following the season, Sabean attempted to address both of these problems, signing Armando Benítez as the team's new closer and Moisés Alou to protect Bonds. However, both Benítez and Bonds spent significant time on the disabled list, and 2005 was the first losing season of Sabean's tenure. Sabean faced increasing criticism that the Giants' success was more related to Bonds than him, and that he was too enamored with older players.

In November 2004, The Hardball Times calculated average ages and win shares for all Major League Baseball teams and found that the Giants had the second-highest Win Share Age at 33.0, and consistently placed in the top five over the past several seasons. One Hardball Times writer predicted that the Giants' aging players would stop producing in the future. In addition to Barry Bonds, Sabean contracted the services of aging veterans such as Reggie Sanders, Marquis Grissom, Michael Tucker, Omar Vizquel, Moisés Alou, Mike Matheny, Steve Finley (via trade), Randy Winn, J. T. Snow, Matt Morris, Armando Benítez, and Tim Worrell during his tenure. After his contract expired, Giants manager Felipe Alou criticized Sabean's strategy of signing older players, saying, "I don't believe one manager enjoys having players die in their hands," in reference to several older players whose careers ended with the Giants.

During this period, Sabean followed a strategy of avoiding high draft picks, telling the San Francisco Chronicle, "Quite frankly, we're very reluctant to overspend in the draft. We're cautious in that regard because it's so fallible. Our focus is spending as much as we can and being as wise as we can at the major-league level and using the minor leagues as a supplement and not necessarily leaning on it totally. Teams that are allowed to have a three-to- five-year plan and allowed to lose or explain to their fans they're in a rebuilding mode have a greater latitude than we do. We always have to be in a reloading mode". The Giants ranked 22nd in baseball on money spent in the draft and internationally between 2000 and 2004. On several occasions, Sabean's signing of veteran players before the arbitration deadline cost the team future draft picks. In 2004, Sabean forfeited the team's number one pick to sign Michael Tucker. In 2005, the Giants didn't pick until the fourth round after surrendering their first three selections to sign Benítez, Mike Matheny, and Omar Vizquel. The Giants did draft and sign first-round pitcher Tim Lincecum in the 2006 draft. Among early draft picks the Giants have used in Sabean's tenure, the majority were used on pitching talent (also see: Jesse Foppert, Kurt Ainsworth, Jerome Williams, Matt Cain, and Noah Lowry).

Following losing seasons in 2005 and 2006 and his signing of Barry Zito to a controversial record-setting contract, many fans and media commentators speculated that Sabean's job could be in jeopardy if the team did not improve in 2007. Team president Peter Magowan declared before the start of 2007 season that all Giants employees were on the "hot seat". However, the Giants rewarded Sabean with a two-year contract extension through the 2009 season following the All-Star break despite the Giants being in last place in the National League West. In previous years, Sabean had been under some pressure to put a team that could "win now" around Barry Bonds instead of rebuilding. Consequently, some critics have blamed Giants ownership and Peter Magowan for the Giants' losing seasons instead of Sabean. After the 2006 season, Magowan and Sabean acknowledged that the previous strategy was no longer working, with Sabean saying, "Older and experienced hasn't worked." Pursuing a rebuilding strategy, the Giants did not re-sign Bonds after the 2007 season and drafted Madison Bumgarner and Buster Posey in the first round of the 2007 and 2008 drafts, respectively.

==== 2010, 2012, & 2014 World Series Championship seasons ====
In 2009, with a re-stocked farm system and a surprise 88-win season, the Giants extended Sabean's contract through the 2011 season. In 2010, several key trades and free agent signings by Sabean such as Aubrey Huff, as well as Sabean's trade of starting catcher Bengie Molina to the Texas Rangers in May to open up the catcher's spot for rookie Buster Posey, paid off as the Giants won the National League West for the first time since 2003 with a 92–70 record. Midseason acquisitions included Javier López, Pat Burrell, and Cody Ross. Despite being heavy underdogs in the NLCS and World Series, the Giants defeated the Atlanta Braves in four games in the National League Division Series, and the two time defending National League Champion Philadelphia Phillies in six games in the National League Championship Series. They then defeated the Texas Rangers in five games in the World Series for the team's first title in San Francisco, and the first title for the organization since 1954.

In 2012, Sabean traded for Melky Cabrera and Ángel Pagán in the offseason and acquired Marco Scutaro and Hunter Pence before the trading deadline. Buster Posey was named National League MVP, and Scutaro was named MVP of the 2012 NLCS as the Giants went on to win the World Series again in 2012, beating the Detroit Tigers in a four-game sweep. In 2014, the Giants won the World Series for the third time in five seasons, defeating the Kansas City Royals in seven games, with Madison Bumgarner earning both NLCS and World Series MVP honors and setting a record for most postseason innings pitched. In a contrast from Sabean's earlier years, the Giants' entire postseason infield was filled with home-grown talent: catcher Buster Posey, first baseman Brandon Belt, second baseman Joe Panik, shortstop Brandon Crawford, and third baseman Pablo Sandoval.

==== Non–GM seasons (2015–2022) ====
In April 2015, Sabean was promoted to executive vice president of baseball operations, ceding day-to-day operations to Bobby Evans while taking on a more active role in player evaluations. After the 2018 season he gave up his role overseeing baseball operations, though he was expected to remain with the Giants in another capacity. In 2019 Sabean was working for the Giants as a scout.

=== New York Yankees (second stint) ===
On January 3, 2023, Sabean was hired by the New York Yankees to serve as the executive advisor to the general manager, Brian Cashman. Following the 2026 season, Sabean's contract was not renewed.

== Legacy ==
Sabean's 18 years as the Giants' general manager was the longest run by a general manager in the club's history, surpassing Spec Richardson (seven seasons, 1975–81), Al Rosen (seven seasons, 1986–92) and Tom Haller (five seasons, 1981–85). Sabean had the longest tenure with the same club among active general managers. During his tenure, the Giants won three World Series (2010, 2012, and 2014), four National League pennants (2002, 2010, 2012, and 2014), five National League West Division flags (1997, 2000, 2003, 2010, and 2012), two National League Wild Cards (2002, 2014), and forced a National League Wild Card tie-breaker game with Chicago in 1998. On two other occasions, the club was eliminated from post season contention on the last day of the season.

He guided the club to seven post season berths—the club's most since it made eight appearances in a 14-season span from 1911 to 1924. From 1997 to 2014, the Giants recorded the third-best winning percentage in the National League (.534, 1,556–1,358), behind only the Braves and Cardinals. His .534 career winning percentage ranks 10th all-time among all general managers since 1950 who served at least 10 years.

== Mitchell Report ==
In late 2007 and early 2008, Sabean and Giants owner Peter Magowan drew some criticism in the Mitchell Report when it was revealed Giants trainer Stan Conte came to Sabean and told him he suspected Bonds trainer Greg Anderson was distributing steroids and Giants management didn't investigate or tell Major League Baseball. Conte had been approached by a player. In the January 2007 Congressional hearings on performance-enhancing drugs, Congressman Henry Waxman asked Commissioner Bud Selig to discipline Sabean and Magowan for their culpability. Some sports insiders argued that Magowan and Sabean actions on steroids was not any different from other clubs at the time.
