= Granite Quarry =

Granite Quarry may refer to:

- Granite Quarry, North Carolina
- Granite Quarry, Wisconsin

== See also ==
- Granite
- Quarry
