= Gaston School =

Gaston School may refer to:

- Gaston School (Gaston, North Carolina), National Register of Historic Places listings in Northampton County, North Carolina
- The Gaston School, a school in Joinerville, Texas
