= Northampton High School =

Northampton High School may refer to the following schools:

- Northampton High School, England, Northamptonshire
- Northampton High School (Massachusetts), United States
- Northampton Area High School, Pennsylvania, United States
- Northampton County High School, North Carolina, United States

== See also ==
- Northampton School for Boys, Northamptonshire, England
- Northampton School for Girls, Northamptonshire, England
