= Carter Capps =

American baseball pitcher (born 1990)

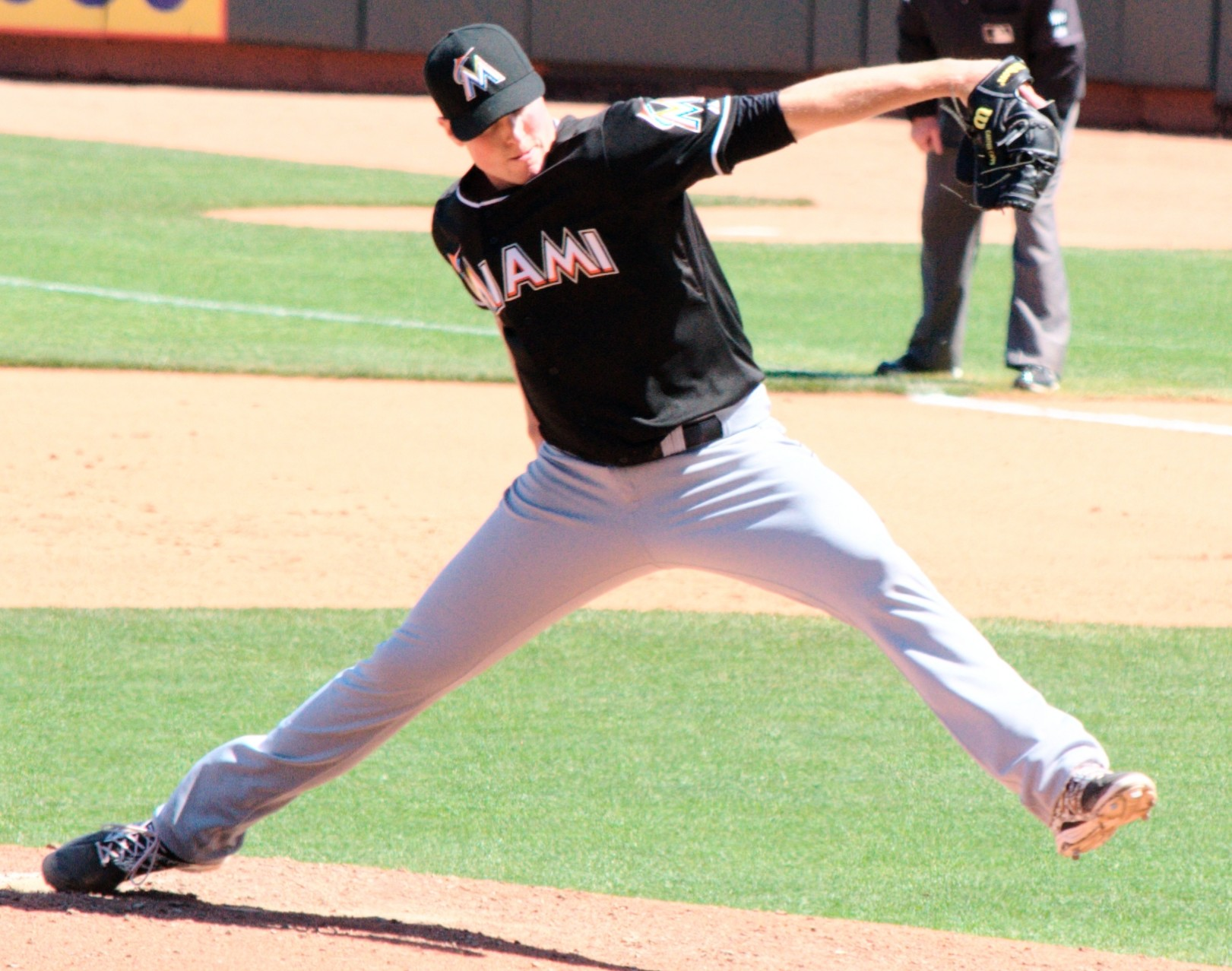
- Capps with the Miami Marlins in 2014

Seattle Redhawks
- Pitcher / Coach
- Born: August 7, 1990 (age 35); Kinston, North Carolina, U.S.
- Batted: Right Threw: Right

MLB debut
- August 3, 2012, for the Seattle Mariners

Last MLB appearance
- September 8, 2017, for the San Diego Padres

MLB statistics
- Win–loss record: 4–3
- Earned run average: 4.21
- Strikeouts: 184
- Stats at Baseball Reference

Teams
- As player: Seattle Mariners (2012–2013); Miami Marlins (2014–2015); San Diego Padres (2017); As coach: Seattle Redhawks (2021–present)

Carter Lewis Capps (born August 7, 1990) is an American former professional baseball pitcher and coach. Capps played in Major League Baseball (MLB) for the San Diego Padres, Seattle Mariners, and Miami Marlins from 2012 to 2017. After his playing career, he worked as a pitching coach.

== Amateur career ==
Capps attended North Lenoir High School in LaGrange, North Carolina. He played for the school's baseball team as a backup catcher.

He enrolled at Mount Olive College and played for the baseball team as a pitcher. He posted a 24–1 win–loss record after two years (including an NCAA Division II-record of 24 straight wins). In 2011, he played collegiate summer baseball in the Cape Cod League as a relief pitcher for the Harwich Mariners, and was named a league all-star.

He earned attention for a three-inning, five-strikeout performance on July 13, 2010, against Team USA's collegiate national team.

== Professional career ==
=== Seattle Mariners ===
Capps was drafted by the Seattle Mariners in the third round of the 2011 Major League Baseball draft out of Mount Olive.

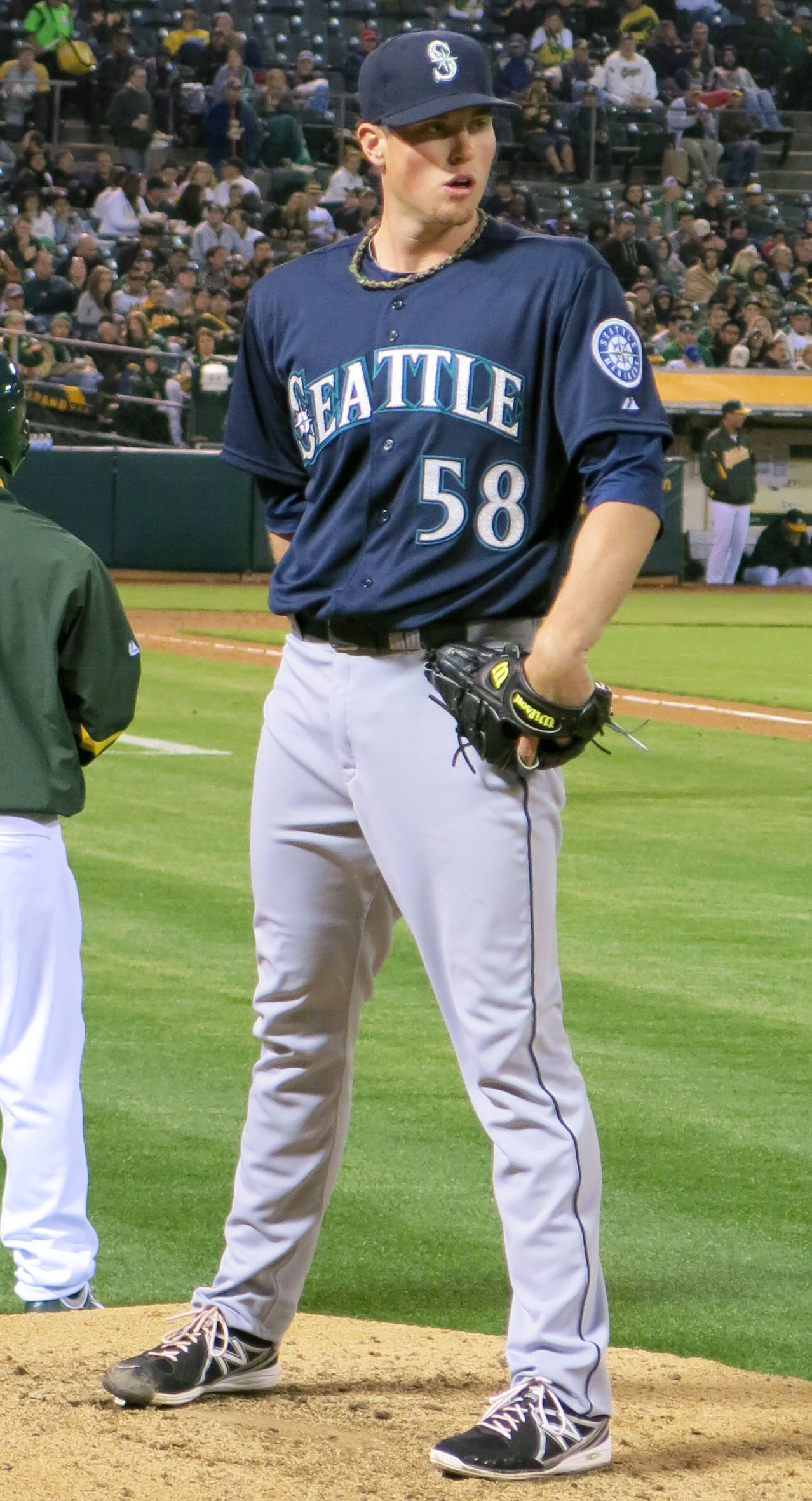
Capps in 2013

After a poor 2011 debut with the Clinton LumberKings of the Single–A Midwest League, in which he had a 1–1 record and a 6.00 earned run average (ERA) in 18 innings, Capps improved dramatically with his performance as the closer for the Jackson Generals of the Double–A Southern League in 2012. Before being promoted to the Tacoma Rainiers of the Triple–A Pacific Coast League Capps struck out 72 hitters in 50 innings and posted 19 saves, along with a 1.26 ERA. He pitched only 1 1/3 innings in Triple–A. For his performance with the Generals, Capps was named the best relief pitcher in the Southern League in 2012.

Capps was called up to the majors for the first time on July 31, 2012. He made his major league debut against the New York Yankees on August 3. His first recorded out was against Derek Jeter.

Capps was recalled by the Mariners on August 6, 2013.

=== Miami Marlins ===
On December 13, 2013, the Mariners traded Capps to the Miami Marlins for Logan Morrison. In 2015, Capps pitched to a 1.16 ERA. On March 8, 2016, in Gulf Breeze, Florida, Dr. James Andrews performed Tommy John surgery on Capps, ruling him out for the 2016 season. Capps had entered spring training expecting to compete with A. J. Ramos for the role of Marlins closer.

=== San Diego Padres ===
On July 29, 2016, the Marlins traded Capps, Josh Naylor, Jarred Cosart, and Luis Castillo to the San Diego Padres for Andrew Cashner, Colin Rea, Tayron Guerrero, and cash considerations.

Capps began the 2017 season on the disabled list, to continue rehabbing from his previous Tommy John surgery. He was outrighted to Triple-A on March 26, 2018. Capps declared free agency on October 9, 2018.

=== Pitching style ===
Although his four-seam fastball was in the low 90s as a starter in college, it averaged 99 mph out of the bullpen in the majors, as-well at times 100-101 MPH. He paired the hard fastball with a sweeping curveball at 81–85 mph and an occasional changeup against left-handed hitters.

With his tall frame, Capps releases the ball at a low three-quarters arm angle far to the side of the pitching rubber, making it difficult for right-handed hitters to pick up the ball out of his hand.

He was notable for having a unique leaping hitch in his delivery, which was described as a "slide skip", a "hop-step", and a "crow-hop". The delivery shortened the distance between him and the batter before he released the ball. The delivery was reviewed by MLB and deemed legal, despite a rule change concerning pitching before the 2017 season.

== Coaching career ==
On January 12, 2021, Capps joined the New York Mets organization as a minor league pitching coach and coordinator. On November 23, Capps was announced as the new pitching coach for the Seattle Redhawks in the NCAA's Western Athletic Conference, returning him to the city where he began his major league career. He left the team before the 2024 season.
