= Northampton County High School – East =

Former high school in North Carolina

Location
- 750 Nchs East Rd; Conway, North Carolina 27820; United States; 36°25′39″N 77°18′56″W

Information
- Established: 1964
- Closed: 2012 (merged to become Northampton County High School)
- Colors: Navy Blue and Gold

Northampton County High School – East was a public high school located in Conway, North Carolina.

== Overview ==
The school colors were navy blue and gold, and their team name was the Rams. The school was usually referred to as "East" by many students and community members.

== History ==
The building of what was Northampton County High School–East was built in 1964. From 1964 to 1981, Northampton County High School–East was known as "Northampton County High School". During that time, the school had the same school colors and team name of the Rams.

From 1982 to 2012, the school went by the name Northampton County High School–East.

In 2012, the school consolidated with Northampton County High School–West, to form Northampton County High School, which school boundaries serve the entire county.

Up until the 2016–17 school year, the location of the newly consolidated Northampton County High School was at the former NCHS–East campus.

== Athletics ==
Northampton County High School–East sports teams were known as the Rams. Sports at the school included baseball, soccer, football, basketball, softball, volleyball, wrestling, and track & field.

== Notable alumni ==
- Bobby Evans, professional baseball executive, served as San Francisco Giants general manager from 2015 to 2018
- Shelia P. Moses, American writer
- Fred Vinson, former NBA player and current coach
