= Keion Crossen =

American football player (born 1996)

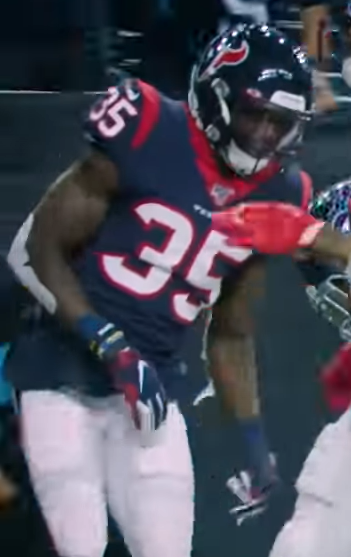
- Crossen with the Houston Texans in 2019

Profile
- Position: Cornerback

Personal information
- Born: April 17, 1996 (age 30); Garysburg, North Carolina, U.S.
- Listed height: 5 ft 10 in (1.78 m)
- Listed weight: 190 lb (86 kg)

Career information
- High school: Northampton County (Gaston, North Carolina)
- College: Western Carolina (2014–2017)
- NFL draft: 2018: 7th round, 243rd overall pick

Career history
- New England Patriots (2018); Houston Texans (2019–2020); New York Giants (2021); Miami Dolphins (2022–2023); Arizona Cardinals (2024)*; Carolina Panthers (2025)
- * Offseason or practice squad member only

Awards and highlights
- Super Bowl champion (LIII)

Career NFL statistics as of 2025
- Total tackles: 118
- Sacks: 1
- Forced fumbles: 1
- Fumble recoveries: 1
- Pass deflections: 10
- Stats at Pro Football Reference

Keion Crossen (born April 17, 1996) is an American professional football cornerback. He was selected in the seventh round of the 2018 NFL draft by the New England Patriots. He played college football for the Western Carolina Catamounts.

== College career ==
A two-sport student-athlete during his time at Western Carolina University in Cullowhee, Crossen stood out on the football field, while also competing for the Western Carolina track & field teams where he was the SoCon champion in the men's 100-meter dash at the 2016 outdoor championships, setting a school-record with a time of 10.33, which also qualified him for the NCAA East Preliminary.

On the football field, Crossen was a two-year starter in the defensive secondary for the Catamounts, amassing 165 career tackles in 46 games over his four-year career including 106 solo stops and five tackles for loss. He finished with three career interceptions and a total of 19 pass break-ups – seven in both his junior and senior seasons.

== Professional career ==
Pre-draft measurables
Height	Weight	Arm length	Hand span	40-yard dash	10-yard split	20-yard split	20-yard shuttle	Three-cone drill	Vertical jump	Broad jump	Bench press
5 ft 9 1/8 in (1.76 m)	178 lb (81 kg)	32 1/8 in (0.82 m)	8 3/4 in (0.22 m)	4.33 s	1.56 s	2.63 s	4.01 s	6.67 s	39.5 in (1.00 m)	10 ft 11 in (3.33 m)	13 reps
All values from Pro Day

=== New England Patriots ===
Crossen was selected by the New England Patriots in the seventh round (243rd overall) of the 2018 NFL draft. Crossen helped the Patriots reach Super Bowl LIII where they defeated the Los Angeles Rams 13–3.

=== Houston Texans ===
On August 31, 2019, Crossen was traded to the Houston Texans for a conditional future draft pick. In the Divisional Round of the playoffs against the Kansas City Chiefs, Crossen recovered a fumble lost by punt returner Tyreek Hill during the 51–31 loss.

=== New York Giants ===
On August 16, 2021, Crossen was traded to the New York Giants in exchange for a 2023 sixth-round draft pick.

=== Miami Dolphins ===
On March 17, 2022, Crossen signed a three-year contract with the Miami Dolphins.

On August 29, 2023, Crossen was placed on injured reserve.

On March 5, 2024, Crossen was released.

=== Arizona Cardinals ===
On October 16, 2024, Crossen signed with the Arizona Cardinals' practice squad. He was released on October 29.

=== Carolina Panthers ===
On October 7, 2025, Crossen signed with the Carolina Panthers' practice squad. He was released on October 21.
