= Fred Vinson (basketball) =

American basketball player and coach (born 1971)

Detroit Pistons
- Title: Assistant coach
- League: NBA

Personal information
- Born: January 28, 1971 (age 55) Murfreesboro, North Carolina, U.S.
- Listed height: 6 ft 4 in (1.93 m)
- Listed weight: 190 lb (86 kg)

Career information
- High school: Northampton County East (Conway, North Carolina)
- College: Chowan (1989–1991); Georgia Tech (1991–1994)
- NBA draft: 1994: undrafted
- Playing career: 1994–2007
- Position: Shooting guard
- Number: 11, 24
- Coaching career: 2008–present

Career history

Playing
- 1994–1997: Atlanta Trojans
- 1994: Atlanta Hawks
- 1994–1995: Mexico Aztecas
- 1995–1996: Fort Wayne Fury
- 1996–1997: Maccabi Giv'at Shmuel
- 1998: New Jersey Shorecats
- 1999–2000: Seattle SuperSonics
- 2000–2001: Chicago Skyliners
- 2001: Cocodrilos de Caracas
- 2001–2002: Southern California Surf
- 2001–2002: Śląsk Wrocław
- 2003: Guaiqueríes de Margarita
- 2002–2003: Yakima Sun Kings
- 2003–2004: SLUC Nancy
- 2004–2005: Long Beach Jam
- 2005: Guaiqueríes de Margarita
- 2005–2006: Gaiteros del Zulia
- 2006–2007: Santa Barbara Breakers

Coaching
- 2008–2010: Los Angeles Clippers (assistant)
- 2010–2024: New Orleans Hornets / Pelicans (assistant)
- 2024–present: Detroit Pistons (assistant)

Career highlights
- CBA champion (2003)
- Stats at NBA.com
- Stats at Basketball Reference

Frederick O'Neal Vinson (born January 28, 1971) is an American professional basketball coach and former player who serves as assistant coach for the Detroit Pistons of the National Basketball Association (NBA). At 6 ft 4 in (1.93 m) and 190 lb (86 kg) he played guard.

Born in Murfreesboro, North Carolina, he attended Northampton County High School – East in Conway, North Carolina. Vinson played collegiate basketball at Chowan Junior College (North Carolina) and Georgia Tech. As a guard at Georgia Tech he was named MVP for the 1993–94 team. During that season he was also the team's third leading scorer. Specializing in long range shooting, Vinson led the Yellow Jackets in three-point field goals (70) and three point percentage (.402).

In the 1994–95 NBA season, he played five games with the Atlanta Hawks, scoring four total points. During the 1999–2000 NBA season, he played eight games with the Seattle SuperSonics, averaging 1.6 points per game. Vinson also played with the Atlanta Trojans of the United States Basketball League (USBL) in 1994, and with the Mexico Aztecas of the Continental Basketball Association (CBA) in 1994–95. Vinson won a CBA championship with the Yakima Sun Kings in 2003.

On August 25, 2008, Vinson was named assistant coach/director of player programs for the Los Angeles Clippers.

On August 4, 2010, Vinson was named an assistant coach of the New Orleans Hornets, along with Randy Ayers. Vinson and the Pelicans made the playoffs in 2011 and they reached the Western Conference Playoffs during the 2014–15 season. On November 16, 2020, Vinson was retained as assistant coach.
