= Kornegay, North Carolina =

- Unincorporated community
- Location within North Carolina Location within the United States
- Country: United States
- State: North Carolina
- County: Duplin
- Elevation: 75 ft (23 m)
- Time zone: UTC-5 (Eastern (EST))
  - Summer (DST): UTC-4 (EDT)
- Area codes: 910, 472
- GNIS feature ID: 1006268

Kornegay is an unincorporated community in Duplin County, North Carolina, United States.

It is the location of B.F. Grady School, designed by architect Leslie Boney, Sr., which is listed on the U.S. National Register of Historic Places.
