= Henrietta-Caroleen High School =

Historic school building in North Carolina, United States

- U.S. National Register of Historic Places
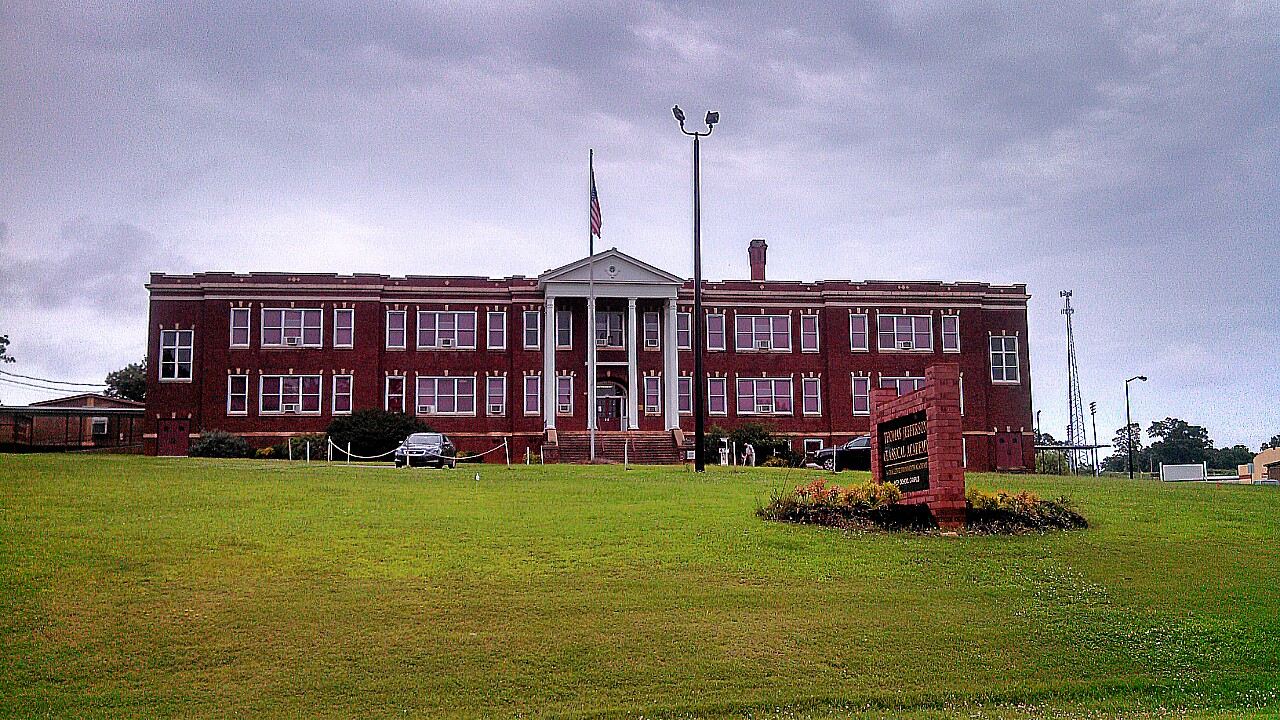
- Henrietta-Caroleen High School, July 2013

- Location within North Carolina Location within the United States
- Location: 2527 NC 221A, near Mooresboro, North Carolina
- Coordinates: 35°16′28″N 81°47′48″W
- Area: 5 acres (2.0 ha)
- Built: 1925, 1935, 1952, 1955, 1967
- Built by: Palmer-Spivey Construction Co.
- Architect: Boney, Leslie N.
- Architectural style: Classical Revival
- NRHP reference No.: 05001451
- Added to NRHP: December 23, 2005

Henrietta-Caroleen High School (also known as Tri-High School, Tri-Community Elementary, and Chase Middle School) is a historic high school building located near Mooresboro, Rutherford County, North Carolina. It was designed by architect Leslie Boney (1880–1964) and built in 1925. It is a two-story on basement, "T"-plan, Classical Revival-style red brick building.

The front facade features a monumental, two-story, portico with a denticulated pediment supported by fluted Corinthian order columns. A brick gymnasium addition was built in 1935 and a hip-roofed, concrete block, addition to it was added in 1952. Also on the property are the contributing cafeteria building (1955, 1967), and a World War II Commemorative Marker (c. 1950). The building now houses Thomas Jefferson Classical Academy, a public charter school.

It was added to the National Register of Historic Places in 2005.
