= La Grange Presbyterian Church =

Historic church in North Carolina, United States

- LaGrange Presbyterian Church
- U.S. National Register of Historic Places
- U.S. Historic district – Contributing property
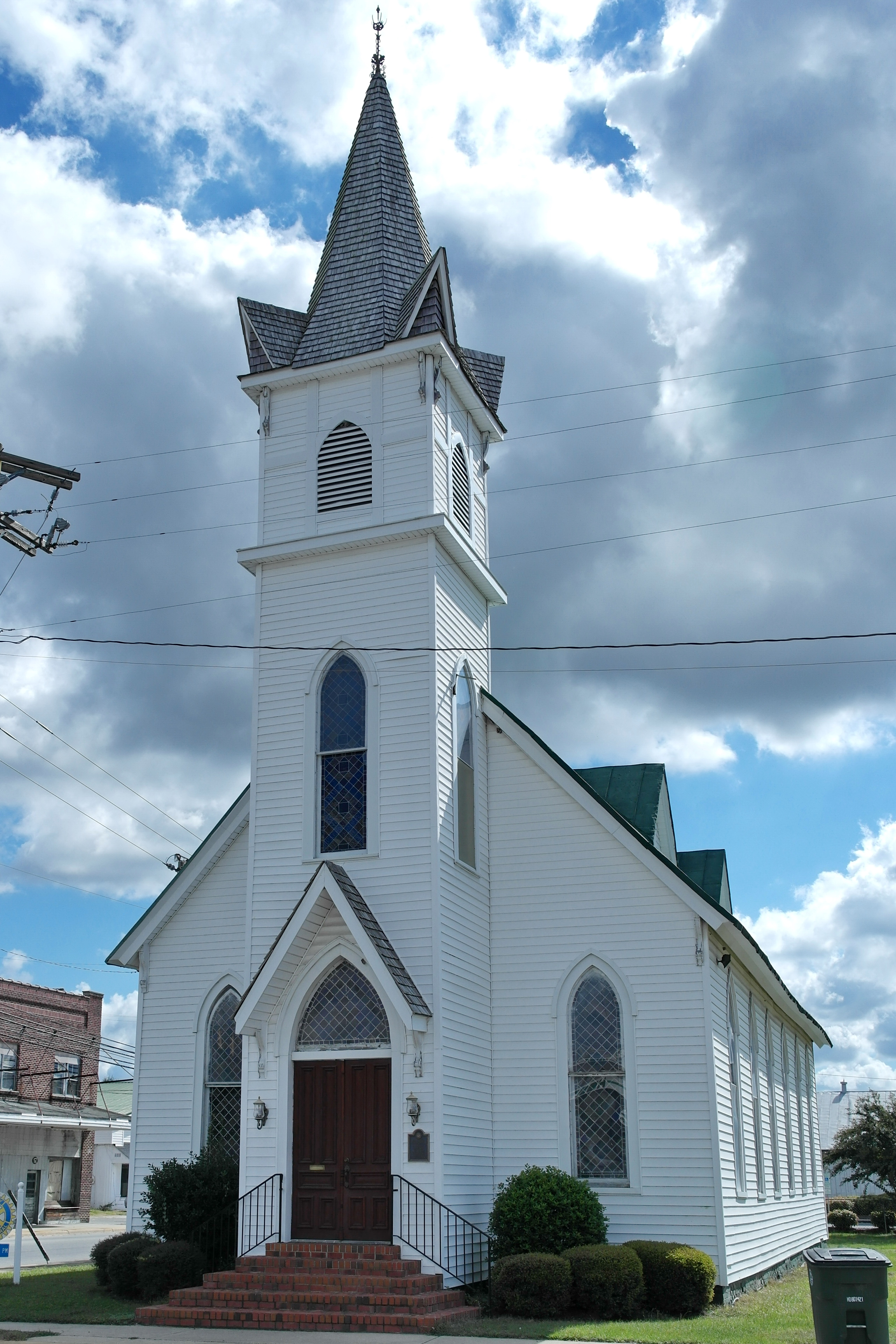

- Location within North Carolina Location within the United States
- Location: 201 S. Caswell Street, La Grange, North Carolina
- Coordinates: 35°18′17″N 77°47′21″W
- Area: less than one acre
- Built: 1892
- Architectural style: Gothic Revival
- NRHP reference No.: 86001646
- Added to NRHP: August 14, 1986

The La Grange Presbyterian Church, also known as the La Grange Rotary Club, is a historic Presbyterian church building located on Caswell Street in La Grange, Lenoir County, North Carolina. It was constructed in 1892, and is a Gothic Revival style frame building.

It was added to the National Register of Historic Places in August 1986. It is located in the La Grange Historic District.

== See also ==
- National Register of Historic Places listings in Lenoir County, North Carolina
