= Vern Benson =

American baseball player and manager (1924–2014)

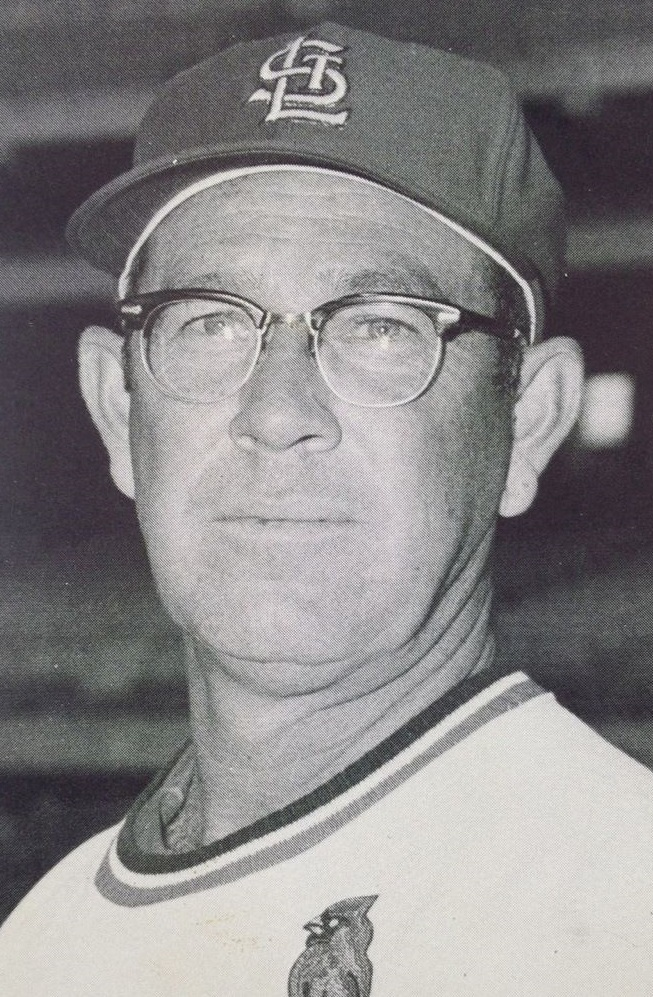
- Benson in 1971
- Third baseman / Outfielder
- Born: September 19, 1924; Granite Quarry, North Carolina, U.S.
- Died: January 20, 2014 (aged 89); Salisbury, North Carolina, U.S.
- Batted: Left Threw: Right

MLB debut
- July 31, 1943, for the Philadelphia Athletics

Last MLB appearance
- May 30, 1953, for the St. Louis Cardinals

MLB statistics
- Batting average: .202
- Home runs: 3
- Runs batted in: 12
- Stats at Baseball Reference
- Managerial record at Baseball Reference

Teams
- As player: Philadelphia Athletics (1943, 1946); St. Louis Cardinals (1951–1953); As manager: Atlanta Braves (1977); As coach: St. Louis Cardinals (1961–1964); New York Yankees (1965–1966); Cincinnati Reds (1966–1969); St. Louis Cardinals (1970–1975); Atlanta Braves (1976–1977); San Francisco Giants (1980)

Career highlights and awards
- World Series champion (1964)

Vernon Adair Benson (September 19, 1924 – January 20, 2014) was an American infielder, outfielder, coach, scout and interim manager in Major League Baseball. During his playing career, he stood 5 ft 11 in (180 cm) tall, weighed 180 pounds (82 kg), batted left-handed, and threw right-handed.

== Playing career ==
Born in Granite Quarry, North Carolina, Benson attended Catawba College in nearby Salisbury. He debuted in the Majors with the Philadelphia Athletics in 1943 and had a second trial with the Mackmen in 1946, but most of his career would be spent in the organization of the St. Louis Cardinals. While he appeared in only 46 games for St. Louis between 1951 and 1953, he was a fixture with the Cards' Rochester Red Wings and Columbus Red Birds Triple-A farm clubs as a player. Overall, Benson batted .202 in 104 MLB at bats over five seasons, with three home runs and 12 runs batted in. In his finest minor league season, 1951 at Columbus, he batted .308 with 18 home runs and 89 RBI.

== Major League coach ==
He became a manager in the Redbird system in 1956 with the Winnipeg Goldeyes of the Class C Northern League. On July 6, 1961, he was promoted from manager of the Triple-A Portland Beavers to the Cardinals to serve as a Major League coach under new skipper Johnny Keane.

Benson worked with Keane through the Cards' 1964 World Championship, then moved to the New York Yankees when Keane switched to the Bombers (his 1964 World Series opponent) in 1965. But the Yankees were in a downward spiral at the time, finishing sixth in the '65 American League race. Then they won only four of their first 20 games in 1966, resulting in Keane's firing and Benson's resignation on May 7.

Two months later, on July 13, 1966, Benson returned to the National League as a coach for fellow North Carolinian Dave Bristol, newly appointed pilot of the Cincinnati Reds. He spent the remainder of his MLB career in the Senior Circuit, as a coach for the Reds (through 1969), the Cardinals again (1970–1975), Atlanta Braves (1976–77), and San Francisco Giants (1980), working in the latter two posts under Bristol once again. He managed the Syracuse Chiefs, Triple-A affiliate of the Toronto Blue Jays, in 1978–79. He won three playoff championships in the minor leagues, in: the Northern League (with Winnipeg) in 1957; the Texas League (with Tulsa) in 1960; and the International League (with Syracuse) in 1979. After his on-field career ended, Benson returned to the Cardinals as a scout.

He also managed the Braves for one game in 1977 under unusual circumstances. After the club lost 21 of its first 29 games, Dave Bristol was sent on a "scouting trip" on May 10 and replaced by the team's owner, Ted Turner, a world-class yachtsman and television executive who had no baseball experience. After Turner lost his only game as the team's skipper on the 11th, National League president Chub Feeney told Turner that managers cannot own financial interest in a club. When Turner's appeal to Commissioner Bowie Kuhn was turned down, Benson stepped in for one game—which he won, 6–1 over the Pittsburgh Pirates on May 12—before Bristol was rehired for the remainder of the season.

== Death ==
Benson died on January 20, 2014, at the age of 89.
