= North Lenoir High School =

Coordinates: 35.3419°N 77.6793°W

Location
- 2400 Institute Road; La Grange, North Carolina; 78945

Information
- Type: Public
- Established: 1964
- School district: Lenoir County Public Schools
- Superintendent: Brent Williams
- Principal: Rhonda Greene
- Teaching staff: 55.58 (FTE)
- Grades: 9–12
- Enrollment: 989 (2023–2024)
- Student to teacher ratio: 17.79
- Colors: Black, White
- Athletics conference: 2A Conference
- Mascot: Hawks
- Website: https://nlhs.lcpsnc.org/

North Lenoir High School is a public high school in La Grange, North Carolina serving grades 9–12. It was created as part of school consolidation of Contentnea, Wheat Swamp and La Grange schools in 1964. The school reports 100 percent of its students are economically challenged. In 2024, 40.6 percent of the student body was white, 39.3% was black and 15.9 percent Hispanic. It won back to back state championships in baseball. The school's mascot was originally a buccaneer and then a hawk. The school colors are black and white. The school is part of the North Carolina High School Athletic Association and its teams compete in the 2A Conference.

The school won state baseball championships in 2005 and 2006. The football coach resigned in 2022 after a rough season. Alumni include Daniel Leon Morgan who played basketball professionally in Finland.

A tenth grader won a national essay contest in 2020. She was the first ever winner from North Carolina.

== History ==
The high school succeeded La Grange High School and Moss Hill High School was consolidated into it.

In 1990, the school made national headlines after five students were suspended for bringing a firearm to the campus.

In 1993, a volunteer basketball coach was charged with murdering a 16-year-old student.

== Notable alumni ==
- Carter Capps, MLB pitcher
- Jason Roach, MLB pitcher
- Sam Shepherd, professional basketball player
- Mitchell Wiggins, NBA player
