= Herring House (La Grange, North Carolina) =

Historic house in North Carolina, United States

- U.S. National Register of Historic Places
- Location within North Carolina Location within the United States
- Location: Northwest of La Grange off SR 1503, near La Grange, North Carolina
- Coordinates: 35°19′44″N 77°48′22″W
- Area: 5 acres (2.0 ha)
- Built: 1801
- Architectural style: Federal
- NRHP reference No.: 73001356
- Added to NRHP: October 25, 1973

The Herring House is a historic home near La Grange, Lenoir County, North Carolina. Built in the early-19th century, the Federal style farmhouse was built by one of the area's early settlers. The building was added to the National Register of Historic Places (NRHP) in 1973.

== History ==
The Herring family settled in present-day Lenoir County in the early-18th century. John Herring (1684–1760), a member of the North Carolina Colonial Assembly, received a land patent in August 1720 for property a few miles from present-day La Grange. The house is believed to have been built by either his grandson, Edward Matchet Herring (1755–1825), or great-grandson, William Herring (1779–1830). A brick in the chimney is marked "1801", most likely the year the house was constructed. It is located on a dirt lane 0.4 miles (0.64 km) west of Ed Herring Road (State Route 1503). When William's youngest son, Joshua James Herring, Sr., deeded the property to his son, Needham Whitfield Herring (1856–1942), on October 11, 1889, the homestead included the house and 314 acres (127 ha). At the time of Herring House's historical survey in the 1970s, the home was still owned by a Herring family member. The house was added to the NRHP on October 25, 1973.

== Architecture ==
Herring House is a two-story Federal style wooden building on a Flemish bond foundation. The front of the five bay wide house (facing south) features a central entrance with transom and 20th century one-story porch with hip roof that continues around the east side. Two bays and a Flemish bond chimney are located on each end of the house. The brick that reads "1801" is in the west chimney. The windows of the house are somewhat narrow. The first floor windows are nine-over-nine sash while the second floor windows are nine-over-six.

There is a central hallway in the home with a large parlor on either side. The walls in the hallway are plastered but feature wainscoting on the lower portion. The plastered walls in the other rooms are lined with a molded chair rail. The open-string two flights staircase is on the left side of the main hallway. The staircase features curved brackets and square balusters. An enclosed staircase is located in the east end parlor.

== See also ==
- National Register of Historic Places listings in Lenoir County, North Carolina
