= La Grange Historic District (North Carolina) =

Historic district in North Carolina, United States

- U.S. National Register of Historic Places
- U.S. Historic district
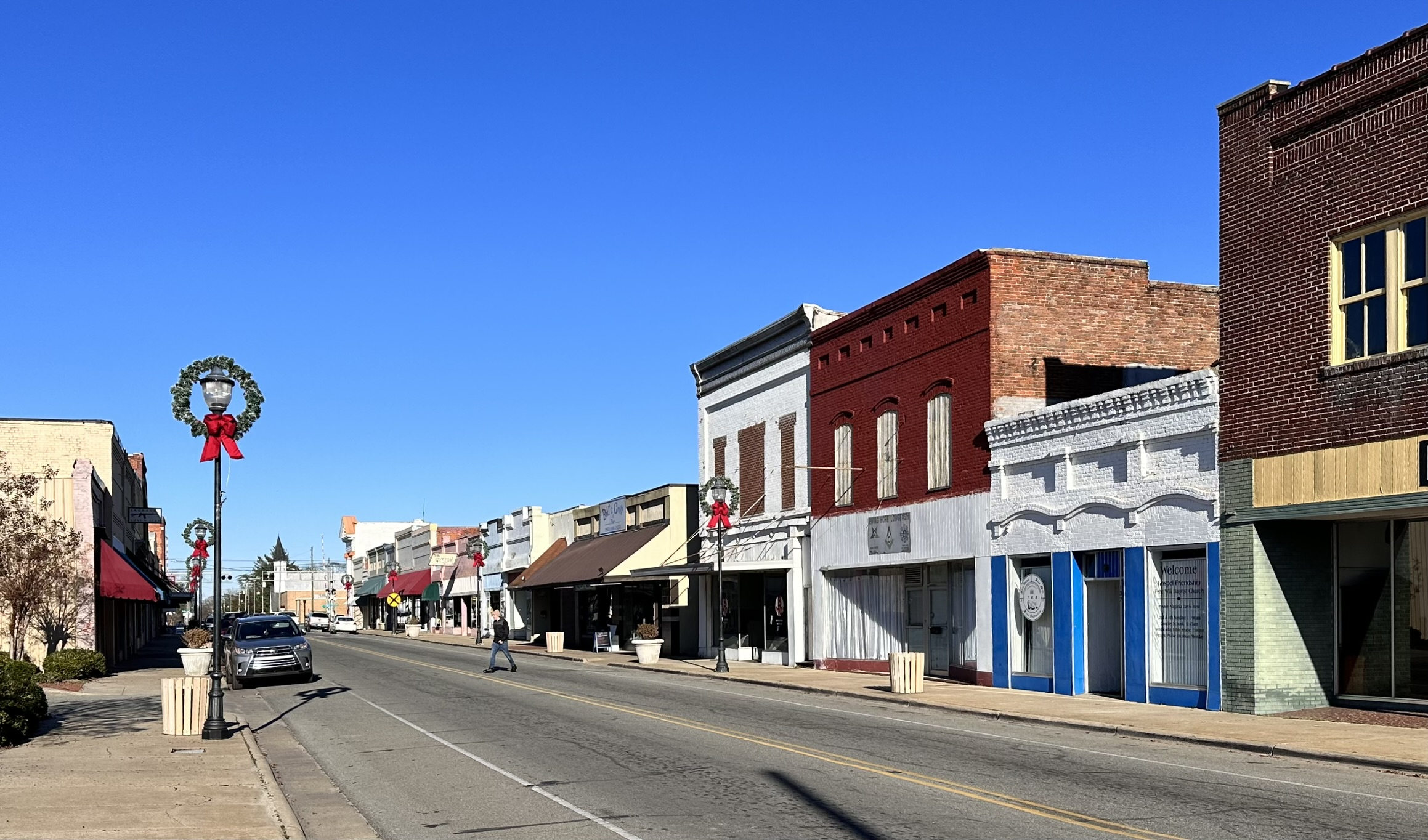
- South Caswell Street in 2023
- Location: Roughly bounded by N. Caswell, E. James, N. Carey, E. Washington, S. Caswell, W. Washington, and Forbes Sts. La Grange, North Carolina
- Coordinates: 35°18′20″N 77°47′30″W
- Architectural style: Multiple
- NRHP reference No.: 00000458
- Added to NRHP: May 11, 2000

The La Grange Historic District is a national historic district located in La Grange, North Carolina, United States. The district, originally encompassing 225 buildings and 1 structure, includes the historic commercial, residential, and industrial center of La Grange. The buildings include notable examples of Gothic Revival, Queen Anne and Bungalow/American Craftsman styles of architecture and date between the 1850s and the 1940s. Located in the district is the separately listed La Grange Presbyterian Church. Other notable buildings include the Sutton-Kinsey House (c. 1898), Walter Pace House (c. 1900), Sutton-Fields House (c. 1850), Colonel A. C. Davis House (1887), and the Rouse Banking Company Building (1908). The historic district was added to the National Register of Historic Places in May 2000.

The boundaries of the historic district are approximately Caswell, James, Carey, Washington, Caswell, and Forbes Streets. The most prominent houses are located along Railroad Street. South Caswell Street is where the one block commercial center is located. Some of the buildings on this block have been demolished or in need of serious repair. Two prominent sites previously designated as contributing properties were La Grange Elementary School on West Washington Street, which was demolished in 2006, and the Hardy-Newsome Industrial Complex, a collection of buildings on West Railroad Street that were demolished in the 2010s.

== Geography ==
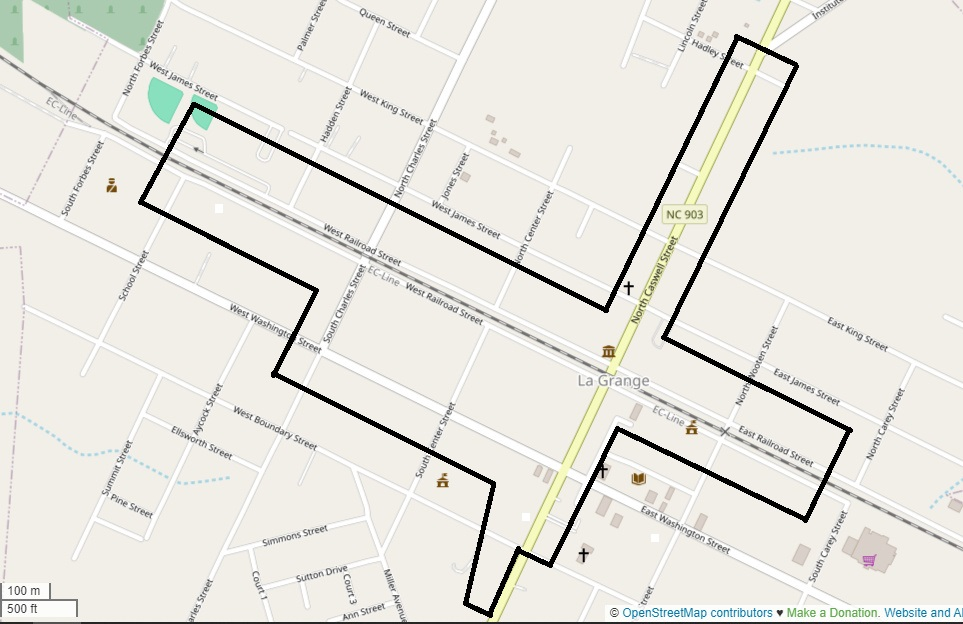
Map of the La Grange Historic District

The historic district of La Grange is predominantly located along two of the streets in town, Caswell Street and Railroad Street. Many of the buildings on these two streets are commercial properties. There are houses on North Caswell and all along West and East Railroad Street, except for the intersection with South Caswell Street. There are large trees and landscaping in the residential areas, complementing the small-town nature of the historic district.

The northern end of the historic district, which encompasses approximately 25 blocks, begins just above the intersection of Hadley Street and North Caswell Street. The boundary heads south, running behind the property lines of buildings along the east side of North Cameron Street. The boundary then heads east, behind buildings facing East Railroad Street and ends before North Carey Street. It then crosses the street and railroad tracks to include buildings on the south side of East Railroad Street. This continues until reaching the properties along South Cameron Street, where the boundary heads south. At East Boundary Street, the boundary crosses the road and heads south for around half a block.

It then heads slightly west before turning north again, running behind the property lines of buildings on West Boundary Street, until just past the intersection with South Charles Street. The boundary turns north on South Charles Street and takes a turn west to include the buildings along West Railroad Street. The boundary goes west until crossing School Street. It crosses West Railroad Street and includes buildings that are on the north side of the railroad tracks. After heading east on West Railroad Street, the boundary stops behind the property lines of buildings on North Caswell Street and heads north, stopping on the other side of Hadley Street, where the boundary began.

== History ==
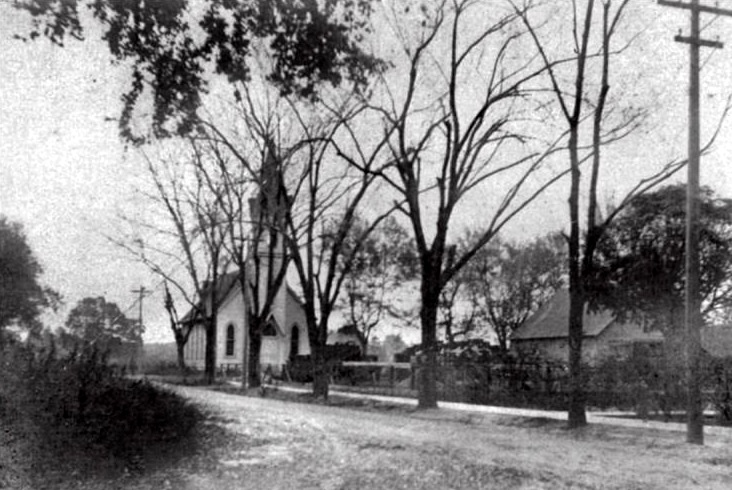
The former La Grange Presbyterian Church, seen here in 1910, is individually listed on the National Register of Historic Places.

La Grange, North Carolina, is a small town in western Lenoir County. The town was originally named after an area plantation, Moseley Hall. Like several towns in the area, commercial development and population growth took place after completion of the Atlantic and North Carolina Railroad in 1858. The railroad tracks began in Goldsboro, located west of the town, and ended at Morehead City on the coast. Moseley Hill was renamed La Grange in 1869 when the town was incorporated. La Grange was named after Château de la Grange-Bléneau, the home of American Revolutionary War hero, Gilbert du Motier, Marquis de Lafayette.

Agricultural and commercial products were loaded onto trains, allowing farmers and merchants to greatly increase their businesses. Before the Civil War, the surrounding farms and plantations mostly grew cotton. Prices dropped after the war, hurting the local economy. In the 1890s, area farmers began growing tobacco, a crop that would become very important to the local and state economies. By the early 20th-century, industrial equipment to process and load tobacco was located along the railroad. By the late 1910s, there were several tobacco warehouses and related buildings located along Railroad Street, none of which survive today.

In addition to tobacco industrial buildings on Railroad Street, there was the Hardy-Newsome Bean Harvester Factory, which has been demolished. The Hanly-Newsome Building, the first of several properties in the Hardy-Newsome Industrial Complex, was erected in 1918. The complex also included a company store where employees would shop. The commercial industry grew on South Cameron Street, with 22 merchants by the late 1890s. In a 1914 survey, some of the businesses located in the town included a jewelry store, clothing stores, furniture stores, grocery stores, a bank, a movie theater, and a drug store.

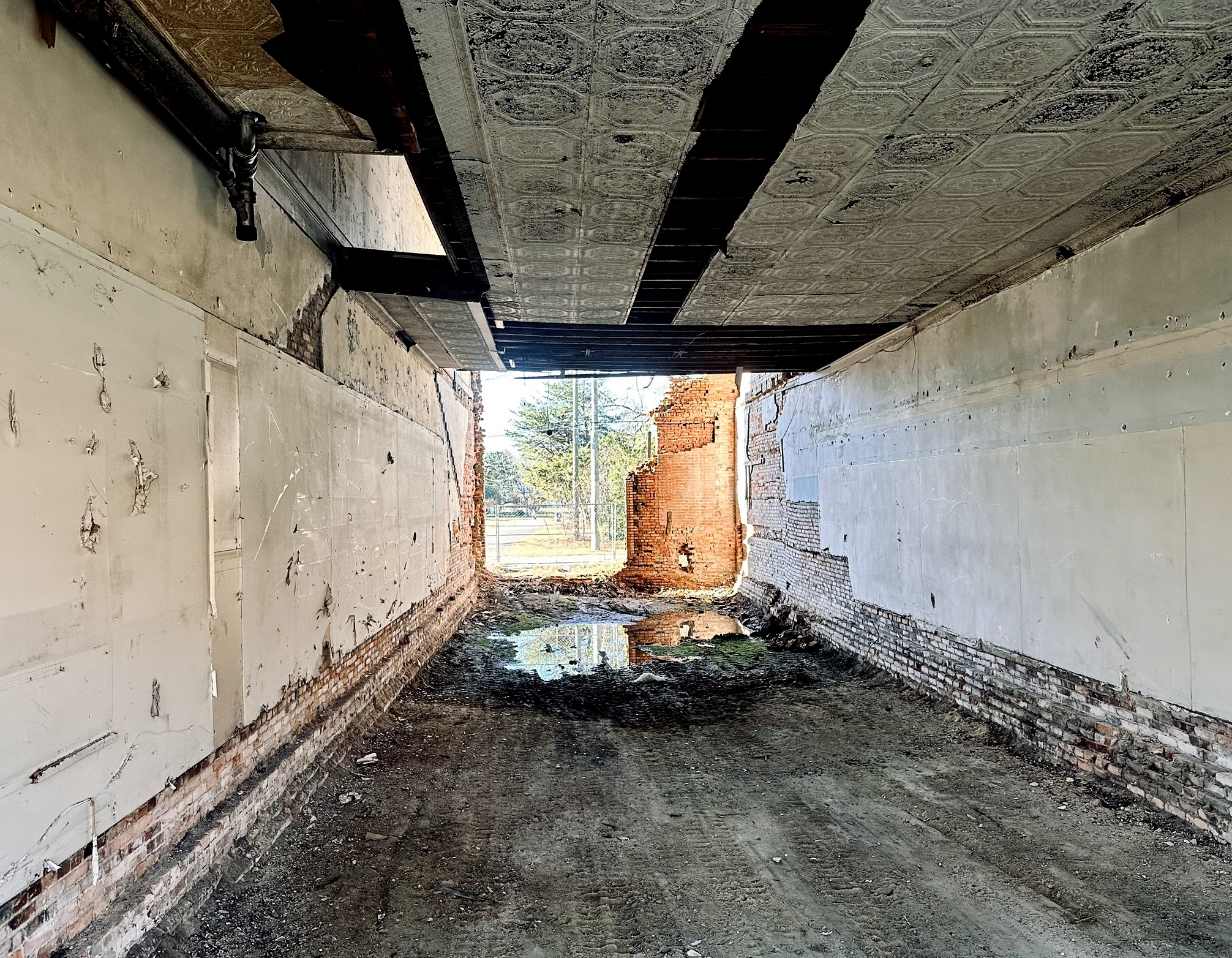
130 South Caswell Street is one of many commercial buildings in need of repair.

Along with agricultural growth once the railroad was built, commercial businesses began opening in the town, including a shoe store, contracting firms, saddle and wheelmakers, and a carriage company, Rouse Carriage Works, that would later become Rouse Funeral Home. In addition to commerce, La Grange became known for its educational institutes, with three private academies located in the town in the 1880s. One of the schools, Davis School, was a military academy, with students furthering their education and military training at the United States Military Academy and United States Naval Academy. The only building still standing from the Davis School is the A. C. Davis House on East Railroad Street.

A public school was established in 1892 and the original school building, which originally served high school students, was later renamed La Grange Elementary School. There were also churches built, including the Bear Creek Baptist Church, La Grange Presbyterian Church, La Grange Free Will Baptist Church, and a Methodist church. By the end of the 19th-century, there were eleven churches in La Grange.

The population of La Grange doubled between 1893 and 1925; with this came an array of architectural styles in houses lining Railroad and Washington Streets. The oldest homes were designed in the Greek Revival style, followed by Italianate, Queen Anne, Colonial Revival, Neoclassical, and American Craftsman. There is one Gothic Revival house in La Grange, the Shade Wooten House. Like many towns, the Great Depression damaged the local economy and smaller houses were built. There are a couple of ranch-style houses in the historic district, with most of them built between the 1930s and 1950s.

To try and preserve older buildings in the town and to note the various architectural styles displayed throughout La Grange, the central portion of the town was listed on the National Register of Historic Places (NRHP) on May 11, 2000. The La Grange Presbyterian Church had already been listed on the NRHP in 1996. At the time of the historic district's listing, it included 225 contributing properties and 1 contributing structure. There were 77 buildings, 1 site, and 2 structures that were labelled non-contributing. Despite this attempt to preserve the town's oldest structures, many buildings in the historic district, including the school and Hardy-Newsome Industrial Complex on Railroad Street, have been demolished since the La Grange Historic District was listed.

== Contributing properties ==
=== Commercial ===
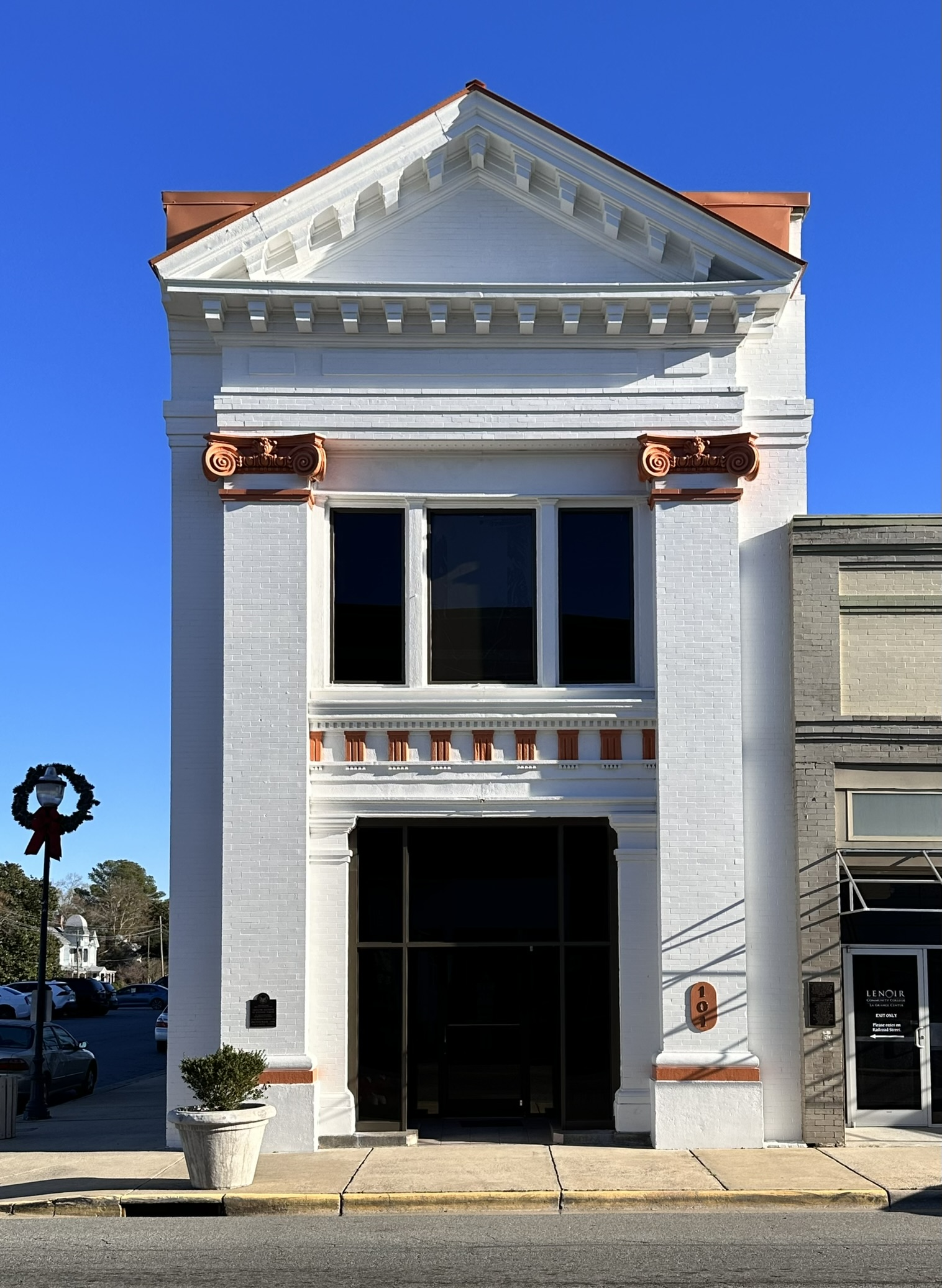
Rouse Banking Company Building, constructed in 1908

The majority of contributing properties in the historic district are located along the railroad tracks and along Caswell Street. There are additional contributing properties found along Washington Street, Boundary Street, Charles Street, Carter Street, and Wooten Street. Many of the commercial properties on South Caswell Street were built in the 1910s. They are predominantly one or two stories, some of which are in need of major repairs. The exception to the one and two-story buildings is the neoclassical Rouse Banking Company Building, constructed in 1908, and located on the corner of South Caswell and East Railroad Street.

On West Boundary Street there is a two-story frame commercial building, formerly the Friendly Mart, that was constructed around 1930. Most of the commercial properties in the historic district are located along South Caswell Street. On the east side of the street, the surviving buildings include 100-136 South Caswell Street. The corner building is one of several that were built in 1912. The remaining buildings on the west side of the street were built between 1905 and the late 1920s. Demolished buildings that were once located at 138-140 South Caswell Street include the former Kinsey General Store, built in 1880, and a commercial building constructed in the late-19th century. There is a service station at the end of the block that was built in the 1950s and is a contributing property. The non-contributing property on this side of the block is 126 South Caswell Street, which was built in the mid-20th century.

The east side of the 100 block of South Caswell Street includes buildings constructed between the late-19th century and 1915. The opposite ends of the street include the Rouse Banking Company Building at the corner of South Caswell and East Railroad Streets, and a commercial property on the corner of South Caswell and East Washington Streets. The latter has been partially demolished in the rear of the building. Between these two corner buildings are 103-137 South Caswell Street. Most of these are one-story buildings constructed in 1912. There is one non-contributing property, 127 South Caswell Street, that was built in 1912 but has been significantly altered. On the 200 block of South Caswell Street are two non-contributing commercial buildings on the west side that were constructed in the 1980s. On the east side of the block are four non-contributing commercial properties, one of which is the post office.

The vast majority of buildings and structures on North Caswell Street are residences and associated buildings. The only commercial building is Rouse Funeral Home, which is a non-contributing property. On East Railroad Street there is a non-contributing fire station. On West Railroad Street, there are a few non-contributing commercial buildings. These include a bank and an adjoining commercial property. Further west on Railroad Street is the former site of the Hardy-Newsome Industrial Complex. On the opposite end of the street stand four contributing commercial buildings, 114-120 East Railroad Street, built between 1914 and 1920.

=== Residential ===
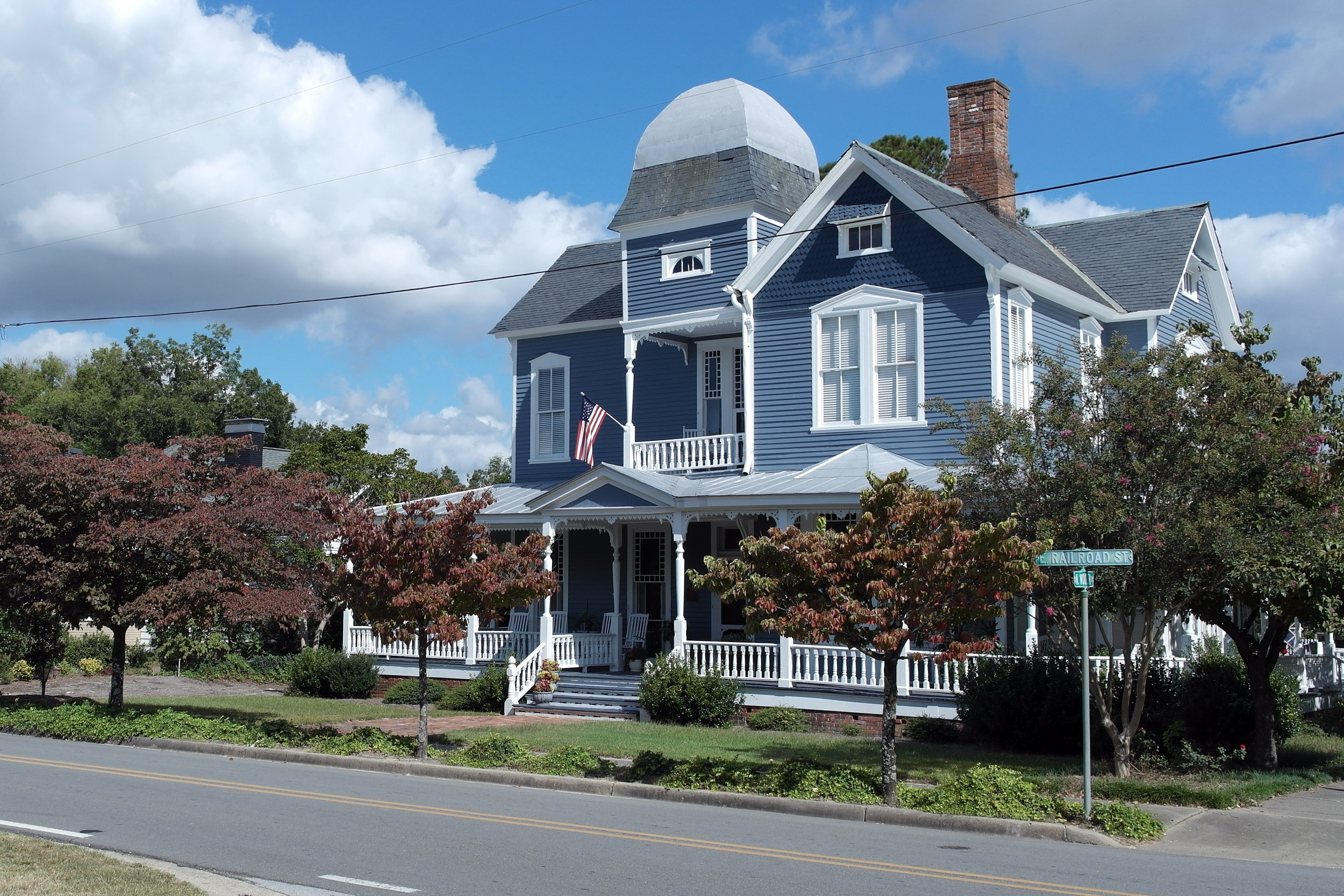
Colonel A. C. Davis House, built 1887

The majority of the buildings in the La Grange Historic District are residential, which includes many outbuildings and garages. The oldest homes were designed in the Greek Revival style and many of the late 19th-century houses are fine examples of the Queen Anne style. Other residential styles represented include Colonial Revival, American Craftsman, and I-houses. The two oldest residences in the historic district, the Sutton-Fields House and George Taylor House, are Greek Revival and located on West Railroad Street. Both were constructed in 1852. Another older residence on the same street is the Shade Wooten House, which was built in 1860 in the Gothic Revival style.

Examples of the Queen Anne style on West Railroad Street include the Radley-Mayes House and 118 West Railroad Street. Many of the homes are bungalows or I-houses that have been modified since first being built. Some of the most notable homes on West Railroad Street in addition to the aforementioned houses include: Rouse House, Hadley-Mayes House, Dr. MacDonald House, Rouse-Joyner House, and the A. B. and Eliza Windham House. There are 14 non-contributing houses, garages, and sheds on West Railroad Street.

East Railroad is lined with historic residences, the most notable being the following: Colonel A. C. Davis House, James and Sudie Wooten House, Pinita Frazier House, Williams House, Octavius Taylor House, Griffon-Sutton House, Davis-Harper House, Leon Rouse House, and the Herman Hardy House. There are four non-contributing outbuildings on this street. On North Caswell Street stands the Walter Pace House, Sutton Jones House, Jones-Mitchell House, James F. Britt House, Dr. Wooten House, Lucy Anderon House, and the Pitts-Creech House. There are 16 non-contributing residences and outbuildings on North Caswell Street. Homes on the remaining blocks in the historic district are mostly bungalows or I-houses, except for 13 non-contributing houses, garages, and sheds.

=== Religious and education ===
The most prominent religious building in the historic district is La Grange Presbyterian Church, which was listed individually on the NRHP in 1986. The Gothic Revival building, which no longer serves as a church, was built in 1892 and is located on a prominent corner in the town. Additional churches in the historic district include the former Free Will Baptist Church at 114 North Caswell Street, built in 1895 in the Gothic Revival style, First Missionary Baptist Church at 201 North Caswell Street, built in 1860 and expanded in 1888, La Grange United Methodist Church at 213 South Caswell Street, built in 1944, and the former Bear Creek Primitive Baptist Church at 210 West Washington Street, built in 1857 and now serving as the La Grange Garden Club headquarters, The non-contributing religious building in the historic district is La Grange Christian Church, built in 1957.

At the time of the historic district's listing, La Grange Elementary School, which previously housed the La Grange High School, was still intact. It was constructed in 1928 in the Colonial Revival style and designed by Leslie Boney. Despite being a contributing property, it was demolished in 2006 and replaced with a new facility. The A. C. Davis House on East Railroad Street is the only surviving building from the Davis School, which previously took up an entire block, and closed in 1889 due to a meningitis outbreak amongst students and staff.

== See also ==
- National Register of Historic Places listings in Lenoir County, North Carolina
