= Bobby Evans (baseball) =

American baseball executive (born 1969)

Evans at the White House in 2015

Robert Carlton Evans (born 1969) is an American professional baseball executive for the San Francisco Giants of Major League Baseball (MLB). He has previously served as San Francisco's general manager from 2015 to 2018.

== Early life and education ==
Evans is from Staten Island, New York. As a young child, his family moved to Framingham, Massachusetts. His father's job with the United States Public Health Service later led the family to move to Jackson, North Carolina.

He graduated from Northampton County High School–East in Conway, North Carolina. Evans would receive a Morehead-Cain Scholarship from the University of North Carolina at Chapel Hill (UNC). He served as a student manager for the Tar Heels baseball team in his freshman year and played baseball at the club level, hoping to be added to the Tar Heels' varsity team, which did not happen.

Evans began working in Major League Baseball (MLB) as an intern with the Boston Red Sox, during the summer after his sophomore year in college. He graduated from UNC with a degree in business.

== Career ==
After graduating from UNC in 1991, Evans was selected to participate in MLB's executive development program. He worked in the Commissioner's Office in New York City for three years. Brian Sabean, then-assistant general manager of the San Francisco Giants, hired Evans in 1994 as a minor league administrative assistant.

Evans was promoted to director of minor league operations in 1998, director of player personnel in 2005, and vice president of baseball operations in 2009. Before the start of the 2015 season, the Giants promoted Sabean to executive vice president of baseball operations and Evans to general manager. On September 24, 2018, the Giants fired Evans as general manager, and reassigned him within the organization.

In December 2024, Evans was hired by the San Francisco Giants as an advisor to the President of Baseball Operations, Buster Posey.

== Personal life ==
Evans is a Southern Baptist. He and his wife, Gwen, have been married since 1999; they have two sons and a daughter.
