= Ahoskie School =

Historic school building in North Carolina, United States

- U.S. National Register of Historic Places
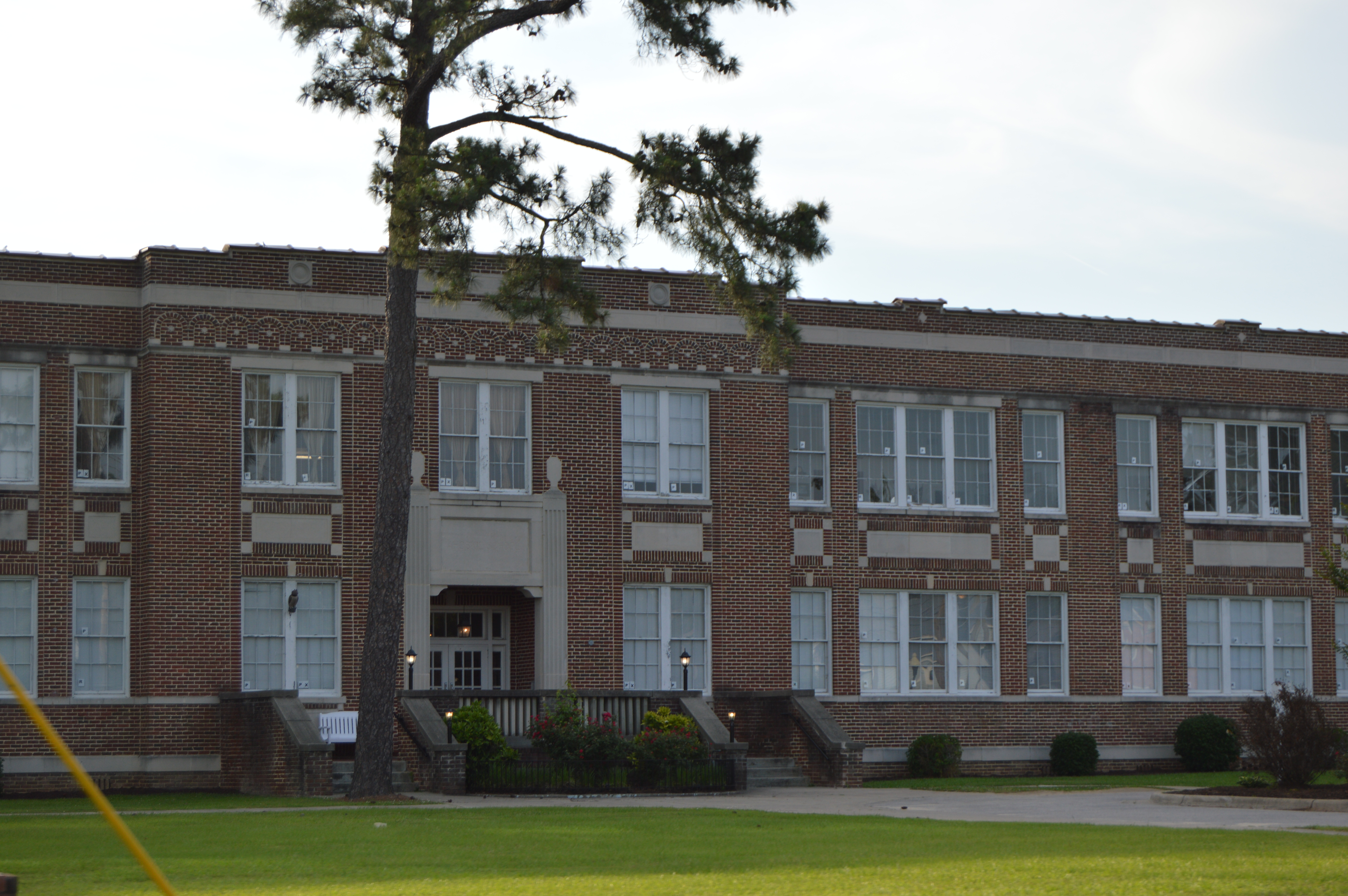
- Facade

- Location within North Carolina Location within the United States
- Location: 105 N. Academy St., Ahoskie, North Carolina
- Coordinates: 36°17′20″N 76°59′28″W
- Area: 9 acres (3.6 ha)
- Built: 1929
- Built by: C.B. Mooney
- Architect: Leslie N. Boney
- Architectural style: Classical Revival
- NRHP reference No.: 05000960
- Added to NRHP: September 7, 2005

Ahoskie School is a historic school complex located at Ahoskie, Hertford County, North Carolina. The main school building was designed by architect Leslie Boney and built in 1929. It is a two-story, Classical Revival-style brick building. Associated with the school are the contributing one-story brick agricultural building (1937), a one-story brick home economics building (1940), a brick and concrete block gymnasium (1940), an athletic field, and a Department of Transportation highway historical marker commemorating the site of the first 4-H club in North Carolina (1955).

It was listed on the National Register of Historic Places in 2005.
