= Taylor Farm (Richlands, North Carolina) =

Historic farm in North Carolina, United States

- U.S. National Register of Historic Places
- U.S. Historic district
- Location within North Carolina Location within the United States
- Location: 337 Comfort Rd., near Richlands, North Carolina
- Coordinates: 34°55′18″N 77°31′53″W
- Area: 153 acres (62 ha)
- Built: 1931
- Architect: Boney, Leslie N.
- Architectural style: Colonial Revival, Bungalow/craftsman
- MPS: Onslow County MPS
- NRHP reference No.: 99000063
- Added to NRHP: January 27, 1999

Taylor Farm is a historic farm and national historic district located in Richlands, Onslow County, North Carolina. The main house was designed by Leslie N. Boney and built in 1931–1932. It is a two-story, brick dwelling with Colonial Revival and Bungalow / American Craftsman style design elements. Other contributing resources include two garages (c. 1931-1932), pump house (c. 1931-1932), barn (c. 1931-1932), Woodward-Taylor Cemetery (c. 1900), silo complex (c. 1940), and the surrounding agricultural landscape.

It was listed on the National Register of Historic Places in 1999.
