= B. F. Grady School =

Historic school building in North Carolina, United States

- U.S. National Register of Historic Places
- Location within North Carolina Location within the United States
- Location: North side NC 11, 0.3 miles (0.48 km) west of the junction with NC 111, near Kornegay, North Carolina
- Coordinates: 35°3′20″N 77°49′54″W
- Area: 3 acres (1.2 ha)
- Built: 1928, 1938, 1947, 1950
- Architect: Boney, Leslie, Sr.; Hudson, H. W., Jr.
- Architectural style: Classical Revival
- NRHP reference No.: 94000085
- Added to NRHP: February 24, 1994

The B. F. Grady School was a historic school building located near Kornegay, Duplin County, North Carolina. Designed by architect Leslie N. Boney, Sr., it was constructed in 1928. This two-story, 27-bay-wide building was built in the Neoclassical style. Additional wings were added in 1938, 1947, and 1950.

It was listed on the National Register of Historic Places in 1994 and remains listed in 2012. However, the building was destroyed in April, 1996. In 2022, Andrew Wilson was selected as Duplin County Teacher of the Year. He taught 5th grade and was the first BFG teacher to ever win the award.
