= Granite Quarry School =

Historic school building in North Carolina, United States

- U.S. National Register of Historic Places
- Location within North Carolina Location within the United States
- Location: 706 Dunn's Mountain Rd., Granite Quarry, North Carolina
- Coordinates: 35°36′57″N 80°26′7″W
- Area: 2.3 acres (0.93 ha)
- Built: 1933
- Architect: Boney, Leslie
- NRHP reference No.: 01000017
- Added to NRHP: February 7, 2001

Granite Quarry School, also known as Shuford Memorial Elementary School and Granite Quarry Elementary School, is a historic school complex located at Granite Quarry, Rowan County, North Carolina. The main school building was built in 1933, and is a one-story, H-shaped building sheathed in granite. It has a side-gable roof with shed dormers and a pedimented entrance portico. Connected to the main building by open, covered walkways are the cafeteria (1956) designed by Leslie Boney and a classroom building (1960). It was originally built for African-American students and continued to operate until 1968 when its students were integrated into other county schools.

An email from Jan Smoot states that education of African-American students in Granite Quarry began around 1906 at White Rock A.M.E. Zion Church, with a one-room school by 1918. A building built by people in the community was dedicated on January 30, 1934. The name was changed in 1965 to honor Principal Clarence Jay Shuford.

The building was listed on the National Register of Historic Places in 2001.
