= Randy Winn =

American baseball player (born 1974)

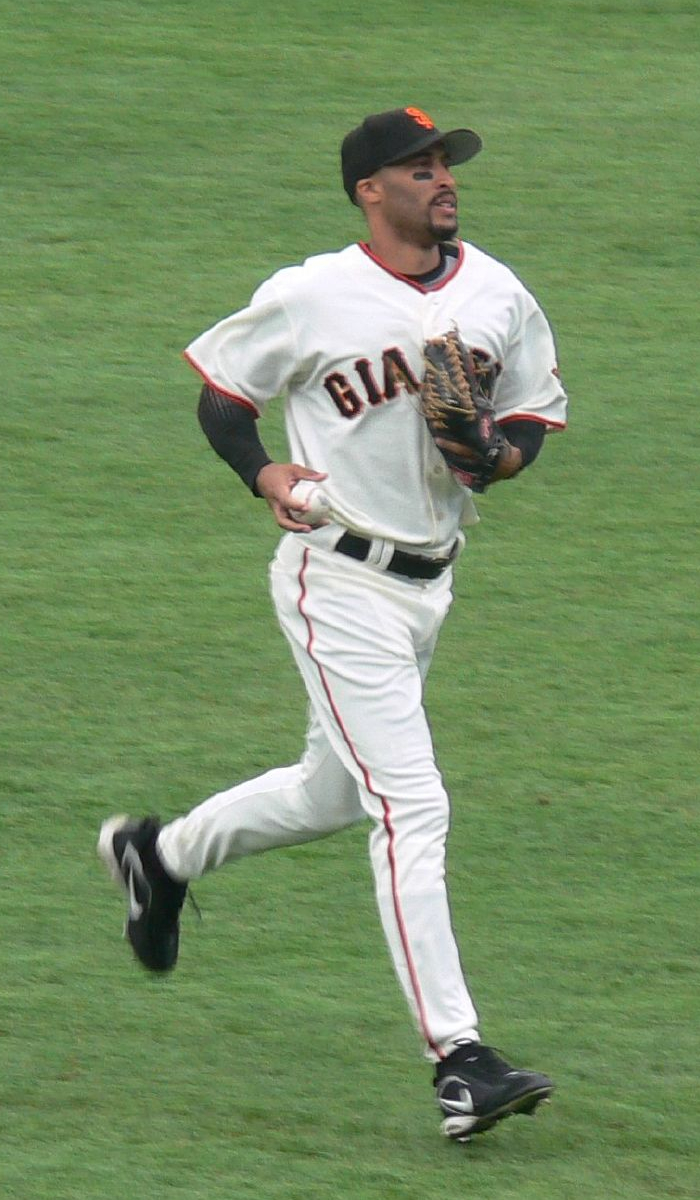
- Winn with the Giants in 2006
- Outfielder
- Born: June 9, 1974 (age 52); Los Angeles, California, U.S.
- Batted: Switch Threw: Right

MLB debut
- May 11, 1998, for the Tampa Bay Devil Rays

Last MLB appearance
- October 3, 2010, for the St. Louis Cardinals

MLB statistics
- Batting average: .284
- Home runs: 110
- Runs batted in: 662
- Stats at Baseball Reference

Teams
- Tampa Bay Devil Rays (1998–2002); Seattle Mariners (2003–2005); San Francisco Giants (2005–2009); New York Yankees (2010); St. Louis Cardinals (2010)

Career highlights and awards
- All-Star (2002)

Dwight Randolph Winn (born June 9, 1974) is an American former professional baseball player and is currently the vice president of player development for the San Francisco Giants of Major League Baseball (MLB). He played all or parts of 13 seasons in MLB, primarily as an outfielder. Winn was a switch hitter, and threw right-handed. He made his major league debut in 1998 with the Tampa Bay Devil Rays, then went on to play for the Seattle Mariners, San Francisco Giants, New York Yankees, and St. Louis Cardinals. He played in the 2002 Major League Baseball All-Star Game. Following his playing career, Winn worked as an analyst for Giants broadcasts on NBC Sports Bay Area from 2013 to 2024, leaving to accept his current position with the Giants.

== Early life ==
Winn was born in Los Angeles but attended San Ramon Valley High School. He attended Santa Clara University and played baseball and basketball (where he played guard alongside Steve Nash, his former roommate and future NBA Most Valuable Player).

== Professional career ==
Winn was selected in the third round (65th overall) of the 1995 MLB draft by the Florida Marlins.

=== Tampa Bay Devil Rays (1998–2002) ===
Winn was taken by the Tampa Bay Devil Rays in the 1997 MLB expansion draft.

Winn made his MLB debut on May 11, 1998, as a pinch runner for the Devil Rays. On October 3, 1999, he hit an inside-the-park grand slam against the New York Yankees. Winn represented Tampa Bay in the 2002 All-Star Game.

=== Seattle Mariners (2003–05) ===
On October 29, 2002, he was traded to the Seattle Mariners as compensation for Lou Piniella being hired to manage the Devil Rays.

Winn recorded 462 hits, 40 home runs, 56 stolen bases, 96 doubles, 17 triples, and a .299 batting average over a 2½ year period.

=== San Francisco Giants (2005–09) ===
The day before the trade deadline on July 30, 2005, Seattle traded Winn to the Giants for catcher Yorvit Torrealba and minor league pitcher Jesse Foppert. Despite a late-season rally, the 2005 Giants finished third in the NL West, with a 75–87 record. In his 231 at bats as a Giant, Winn had a .359 batting average, a .680 slugging percentage, 26 RBI, and hit 14 home runs. By comparison, in his 386 at bats with the Mariners that year, Winn was batting .275, slugging .391, had 37 RBIs, and hit 6 home runs.

In his two months with the Giants, Winn equaled his career best for home runs in a season. For his performance in the month of September, Winn was named National League Player of the Month; he recorded 51 hits and had a batting average of .447. Winn's 51 hits were the most in one month by a Giant in over 30 years. Winn had a career-high hitting streak of 20 games. He signed a three-year, $23.25M contract extension with the Giants the following offseason.

In 2006 Winn played in 149 games making 635 plate appearances and saw his average, OBP and slugging drop to .262/.324/.396.

In 2007 Winn played in 155 games making 653 plate appearances and saw his average, OBP and slugging rebound closer to his career averages .300/.353/.455.

In 2008, Winn repeated his 155 games and made 667 plate appearances. His average, OBP and slugging were .306/.363/.426.

In 149 games in 2009, Winn made 597 plate appearances while averaging .262, getting on base .318 and slugging .353. He hit just two home runs and his slugging declined for three straight years. He did record his 200th stolen base and 500th walk during that year. Winn became a free agent following the season.

=== New York Yankees and St. Louis Cardinals (2010) ===
On February 8, 2010, Winn signed a one-year deal with the New York Yankees. On May 28, he was designated for assignment as Curtis Granderson was activated from the disabled list. On May 28, 2010, he was officially released by the Yankees. He signed with the St. Louis Cardinals on June 5, and finished the season with them, becoming a free agent at the end of the season.

=== Baltimore Orioles (2011) ===
Winn signed a minor league contract with the Baltimore Orioles on February 3, 2011. Four days after his request for an unconditional release was granted on March 28, he announced his retirement as an active player on April 1.

He appeared on the 2016 election ballot for the National Baseball Hall of Fame and earned zero votes.

=== Career statistics ===
In 1,717 games spanning 13 seasons, Winn posted a .284 batting average (1,759-for-6,186) with 863 runs, 367 doubles, 59 triples, 110 home runs, 662 RBI, 215 stolen bases, 526 base on balls, .343 on-base percentage and .416 slugging percentage. He recorded a .992 fielding percentage playing at all three outfield positions.

== Post-playing career ==
From the 2013 season, Winn began broadcasting San Francisco Giants games as a part-time color analyst for NBC Bay Area. That same year and through 2016, Winn was also a roving instructor working with outfielders and baserunners. For the next two seasons, Winn was a special assistant to general manager Bobby Evans, then moved to professional scouting in 2019, reporting to Zack Minasian. Before the 2025 season began, Winn was named vice president of player development.

== Personal life ==
In 2002, five days after being traded to Seattle, Winn married his college sweetheart, Blessings Robertson.

== See also ==
- List of Major League Baseball career stolen bases leaders
- List of Major League Baseball players to hit for the cycle

Awards and achievements
Preceded by Mark Grudzielanek	Hitting for the cycle August 15, 2005	Succeeded by José Reyes
Preceded by Andruw Jones	National League Player of the Month; September 2005	Succeeded by Albert Pujols
