= KIPP Pride High School =

American public charter school in North Carolina

Location
- 9986 NC-903; Halifax, North Carolina 27839; United States
- 36°30′15″N 77°38′24″W

Information
- Type: Public charter school
- Motto: "Non scholae sed vitae discimus"
- Founded: 2005 (21 years ago)
- CEEB code: 341441
- Leader: Shanae McWhite and Keith Starr
- Website: www.kipp.org/school/kipp-pride-high-school/

KIPP Pride High School is a 9–12th grade open-enrollment charter school founded in 2005. It is part of KIPP (Knowledge is Power Program), a national network of charter schools.
