= Gaston School (Gaston, North Carolina) =

Historic school building in North Carolina, United States

- U.S. National Register of Historic Places
- Location within North Carolina Location within the United States
- Location: 200 School St., Gaston, North Carolina
- Coordinates: 36°29′52″N 77°38′49″W
- Area: 12.13 acres (4.91 ha)
- Built: c. 1950-1968
- Architect: Boney, Leslie N.
- Architectural style: Modernist
- NRHP reference No.: 12000215
- Added to NRHP: April 11, 2012

Gaston School is a historic high school building located at Gaston, Northampton County, North Carolina. It was designed by architect Leslie Boney and built about 1950, with additions made about 1952; 1955, about 1962, and about 1968. It is a brick-clad, flat-roofed, one-story Modernist building. Also on the property is the contributing home economics and auto shop building (c. 1952, c. 1968). The school closed about 1990.

It was listed on the National Register of Historic Places in 2012.
