= Mooresboro, North Carolina =

- Town
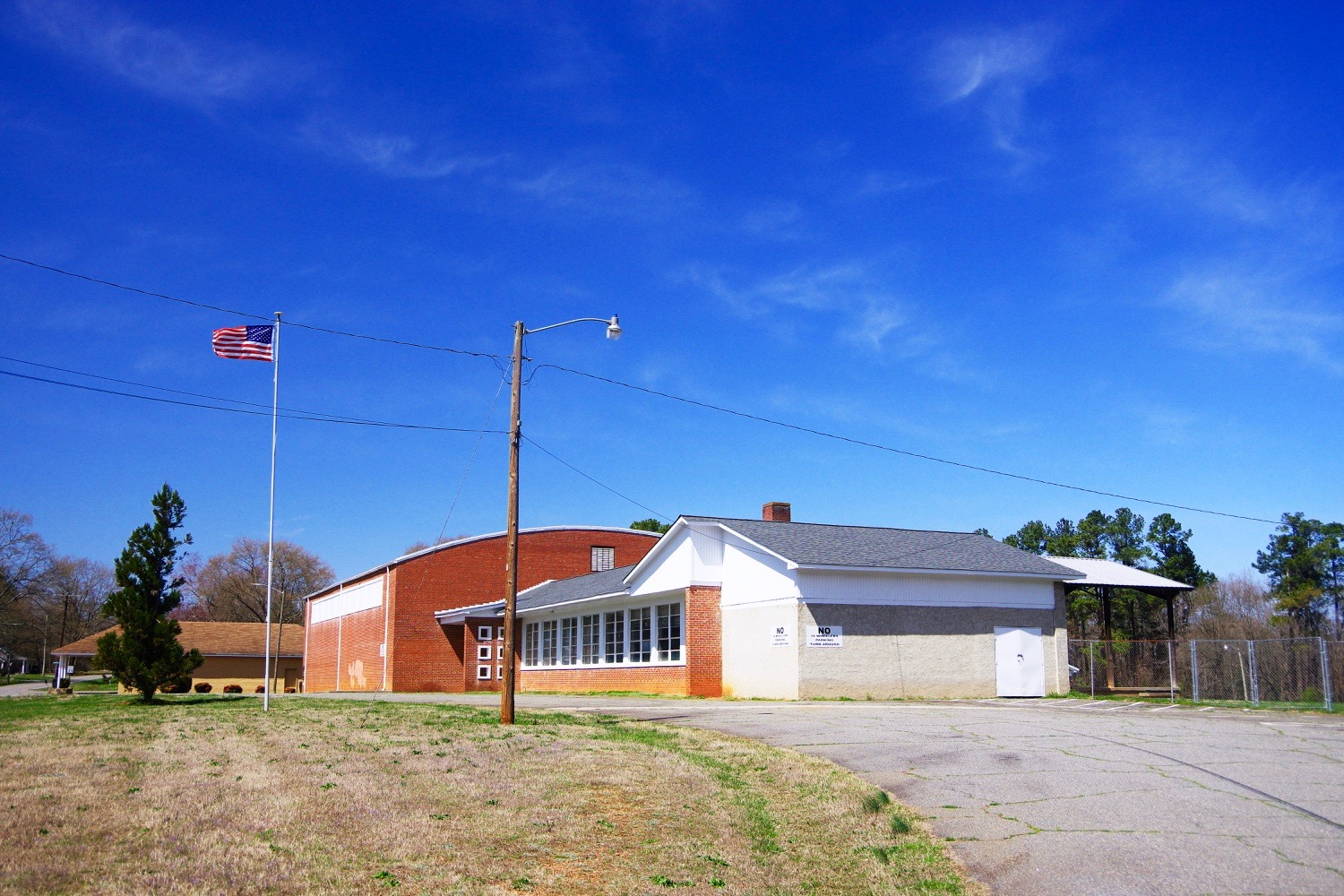
- Old Mooresboro Gym

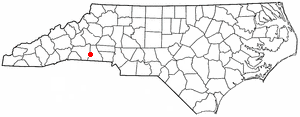
- Location of Mooresboro, North Carolina
- Coordinates: 35°17′57″N 81°41′55″W
- Country: United States
- State: North Carolina
- County: Cleveland

Area
  - Total: 1.77 sq mi (4.58 km^{2})
  - Land: 1.77 sq mi (4.58 km^{2})
  - Water: 0 sq mi (0.00 km^{2})
- Elevation: 886 ft (270 m)

Population (2020)
  - Total: 293
  - Density: 165.8/sq mi (64.01/km^{2})
- Time zone: UTC-5 (Eastern (EST))
  - Summer (DST): UTC-4 (EDT)
- ZIP code: 28114
- Area codes: 704, 828, 980
- FIPS code: 37-44160
- GNIS feature ID: 2406187
- Website: townofmooresboro.og

Mooresboro is a town in Cleveland County, North Carolina, United States. As of the 2020 census, Mooresboro had a population of 293.

== History ==
Mooresboro was settled in the 1780s, it was incorporated as a town in 1885, and its charter was repealed in 1943. It was named for Lem Moore, an early settler.

The Henrietta-Caroleen High School was added to the National Register of Historic Places in 2005.

== Geography ==
According to the United States Census Bureau, the town has a total area of 1.8 square miles (4.7 km^{2}), all land.

== Demographics ==
Historical population
Census	Pop.	Note	%±
1890	197		—
1900	144		−26.9%
1920	228		—
1930	270		18.4%
1980	405		—
1990	294		−27.4%
2000	314		6.8%
2010	311		−1.0%
2020	293		−5.8%
U.S. Decennial Census

As of the census of 2000, there were 314 people, 131 households, and 94 families residing in the town. The population density was 178.3 inhabitants per square mile (68.8/km^{2}). There were 140 housing units at an average density of 79.5 per square mile (30.7/km^{2}). The racial makeup of the town was 88.22% White, 11.46% African American and 0.32% Pacific Islander.

There were 131 households, out of which 33.6% had children under the age of 18 living with them, 51.1% were married couples living together, 16.8% had a female householder with no husband present, and 28.2% were non-families. 27.5% of all households were made up of individuals, and 9.9% had someone living alone who was 65 years of age or older. The average household size was 2.40 and the average family size was 2.88.

In the town, the population was spread out, with 25.2% under the age of 18, 5.7% from 18 to 24, 30.9% from 25 to 44, 25.2% from 45 to 64, and 13.1% who were 65 years of age or older. The median age was 38 years. For every 100 females, there were 95.0 males. For every 100 females age 18 and over, there were 91.1 males.

The median income for a household in the town was $33,125, and the median income for a family was $36,500. Males had a median income of $29,219 versus $27,083 for females. The per capita income for the town was $19,791. About 8.5% of families and 13.7% of the population were below the poverty line, including 29.4% of those under age 18 and 28.9% of those age 65 or over.

== Notable people ==
- Chris Hamrick (b.1966), professional wrestler
- Tyler White (b.1990), Major League Baseball player
