= Northampton County High School =

American public school in North Carolina

Northampton Collegiate and Technical High School

Location
- 152 Hurricane Drive; Gaston, North Carolina 27832; United States; 36°30′40″N 77°39′19″W

Information
- Former name: Northampton County High School (2012–2026)
- School type: Public
- Established: 2012 (14 years ago)
- School district: Northampton County Schools
- Teaching staff: 18.73 (FTE)
- Grades: 9–12
- Enrollment: 265 (2024-2025)
- Student to teacher ratio: 14.15
- Colors: Navy, teal, and white
- Team name: Jaguars
- Website: nchs.northampton.k12.nc.us

Northampton Collegiate and Technical High School (also known as Northampton County High School) is a public high school in Gaston, North Carolina. It is a part of the Northampton County Schools district.

== History ==
Northampton Collegiate and Technical High School stems from the consolidation of the counties two former high schools, Northampton County High School–East and Northampton County High School–West. These two schools consolidated in 2012, with 2012–13 school year being the first year as the newly formed Northampton County High School.

Up until the 2016–17 school year, Northampton County High School was at the site of the former NCHS–East campus, before moving to its current location, which is the site of the former NCHS–West campus.

In 2026, the school name was changed to Northampton Collegiate and Technical High School.

== Athletics ==
Northampton Collegiate and Technical High School is a part of the North Carolina High School Athletic Association (NCHSAA). The school colors are navy, teal and white, and its team name are the Jaguars. Listed below are the different sport teams at the school:

- Baseball
- Basketball
- Cross Country
- Football
- Golf
- Softball
- Tennis
- Track & Field
- Volleyball

== Notable alumni ==
- Keion Crossen, former NFL cornerback, Super Bowl LIII champion with the New England Patriots
