= Wallace Commercial Historic District =

Historic district in North Carolina, United States

- U.S. National Register of Historic Places
- U.S. Historic district
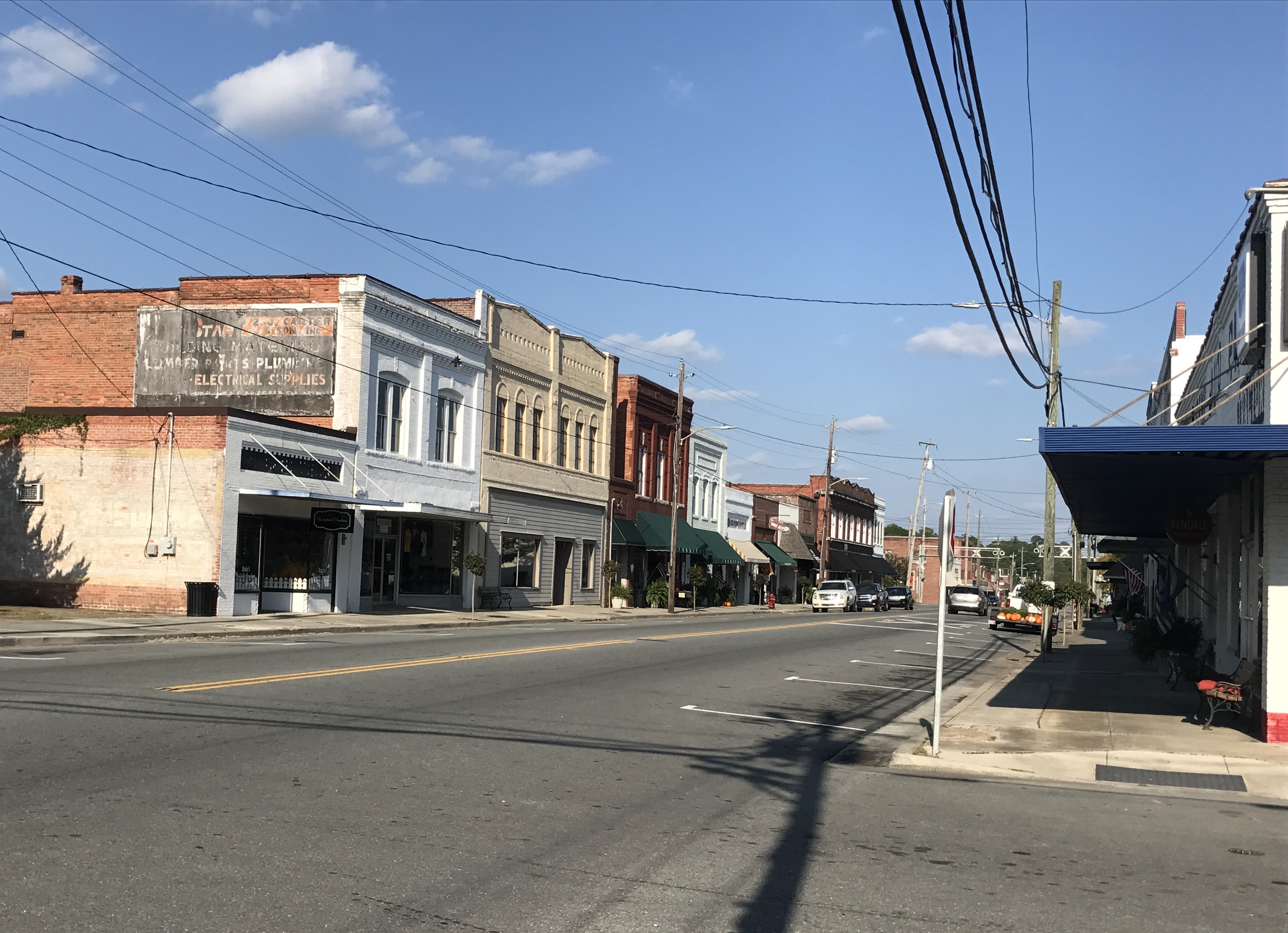

- Location within North Carolina Location within the United States
- Location: Roughly bounded by Southerland, College, Boney and Raleigh Sts., Wallace, North Carolina
- Coordinates: 34°44′08″N 77°59′35″W
- Area: 17.3 acres (7.0 ha)
- Built: 1838
- Architect: Leslie N. Boney Sr., Louis Simon
- Architectural style: Queen Anne, Moderne
- MPS: Duplin County MPS
- NRHP reference No.: 95001179
- Added to NRHP: October 20, 1995

Wallace Commercial Historic District is a national historic district located at Wallace, Duplin County, North Carolina. The district encompasses 55 contributing buildings in the central business district of Wallace. It primarily includes commercial buildings with notable examples of Queen Anne and Moderne style architecture. Notable buildings include the (former) Wallace Post Office (1940-1941), (former) Farmers Bank & Trust Company (1922), White House Cafe, Wallace Depot and Freight Warehouse, Oscar Rivenbark Wholesale Building (c. 1945), Johnson Cotton Company Building and adjacent Warehouse (c. 1945), Blanchard Pontiac dealership (c. 1945), and the former Robert Carr Gulf Station (c. 1936).

It was added to the National Register of Historic Places in 1995.
