= Gaston, North Carolina =

Town in Northampton County

- Town
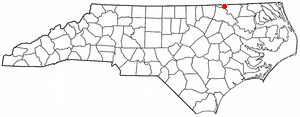
- Location of Gaston, North Carolina
- Coordinates: 36°29′47″N 77°38′41″W
- Country: United States
- State: North Carolina
- County: Northampton

Area
  - Total: 1.83 sq mi (4.74 km^{2})
  - Land: 1.69 sq mi (4.38 km^{2})
  - Water: 0.14 sq mi (0.36 km^{2})
- Elevation: 131 ft (40 m)

Population (2020)
  - Total: 1,008
  - Density: 596/sq mi (230.2/km^{2})
- Time zone: UTC-5 (Eastern (EST))
  - Summer (DST): UTC-4 (EDT)
- ZIP code: 27832
- Area code: 252
- FIPS code: 37-25560
- GNIS feature ID: 2406550

Gaston is a town in Northampton County, North Carolina, United States. As of the 2020 census, Gaston had a population of 1,008. It is part of the Roanoke Rapids, North Carolina Micropolitan Statistical Area.

== History ==
The Gaston School was listed on the National Register of Historic Places in 2012.

== Geography ==
According to the United States Census Bureau, the town has a total area of 1.8 square miles (4.7 km^{2}), of which 1.7 square miles (4.4 km^{2}) is land and 0.1 square miles (0.26 km^{2}) (7.65%) is water.

== Demographics ==
Historical population
Census	Pop.	Note	%±
1850	274		—
1870	11		—
1950	1,218		—
1960	1,214		−0.3%
1970	1,105		−9.0%
1980	883		−20.1%
1990	1,003		13.6%
2000	973		−3.0%
2010	1,152		18.4%
2020	1,008		−12.5%
U.S. Decennial Census

=== 2020 census ===
Gaston racial composition
Race	Number	Percentage
White (non-Hispanic)	502	49.8%
Black or African American (non-Hispanic)	447	44.35%
Native American	10	0.99%
Other/Mixed	34	3.37%
Hispanic or Latino	15	1.49%

As of the 2020 United States census, there were 1,008 people, 567 households, and 341 families residing in the town.

=== 2000 census ===
As of the census of 2000, there were 973 people, 429 households, and 296 families residing in the town. The population density was 575.5 inhabitants per square mile (222.2/km^{2}). There were 479 housing units at an average density of 283.3 per square mile (109.4/km^{2}). The racial makeup of the town was 66.39% White, 31.76% African American, 0.31% Native American, 0.31% from other races, and 1.23% from two or more races. Hispanic or Latino of any race were 1.03% of the population.

There were 429 households, out of which 27.7% had children under the age of 18 living with them, 43.6% were married couples living together, 22.6% had a female householder with no husband present, and 30.8% were non-families. 27.7% of all households were made up of individuals, and 11.9% had someone living alone who was 65 years of age or older. The average household size was 2.27 and the average family size was 2.73.

In the town, the population was spread out, with 24.7% under the age of 18, 8.8% from 18 to 24, 28.8% from 25 to 44, 23.1% from 45 to 64, and 14.6% who were 65 years of age or older. The median age was 37 years. For every 100 females, there were 82.2 males. For every 100 females age 18 and over, there were 80.5 males.

The median income for a household in the town was $23,824, and the median income for a family was $29,375. Males had a median income of $27,500 versus $18,819 for females. The per capita income for the town was $14,247. About 18.2% of families and 21.1% of the population were below the poverty line, including 35.5% of those under age 18 and 18.4% of those age 65 or over.

== Education ==
The elementary and middle schools serving Gaston are Gaston Elementary and Gaston Middle. The high school serving Gaston is Northampton County High School. Also located in Gaston is KIPP Pride High School, a charter school that's part of the Knowledge is Power Program commonly known as KIPP.
