= La Grange, North Carolina =

- Town
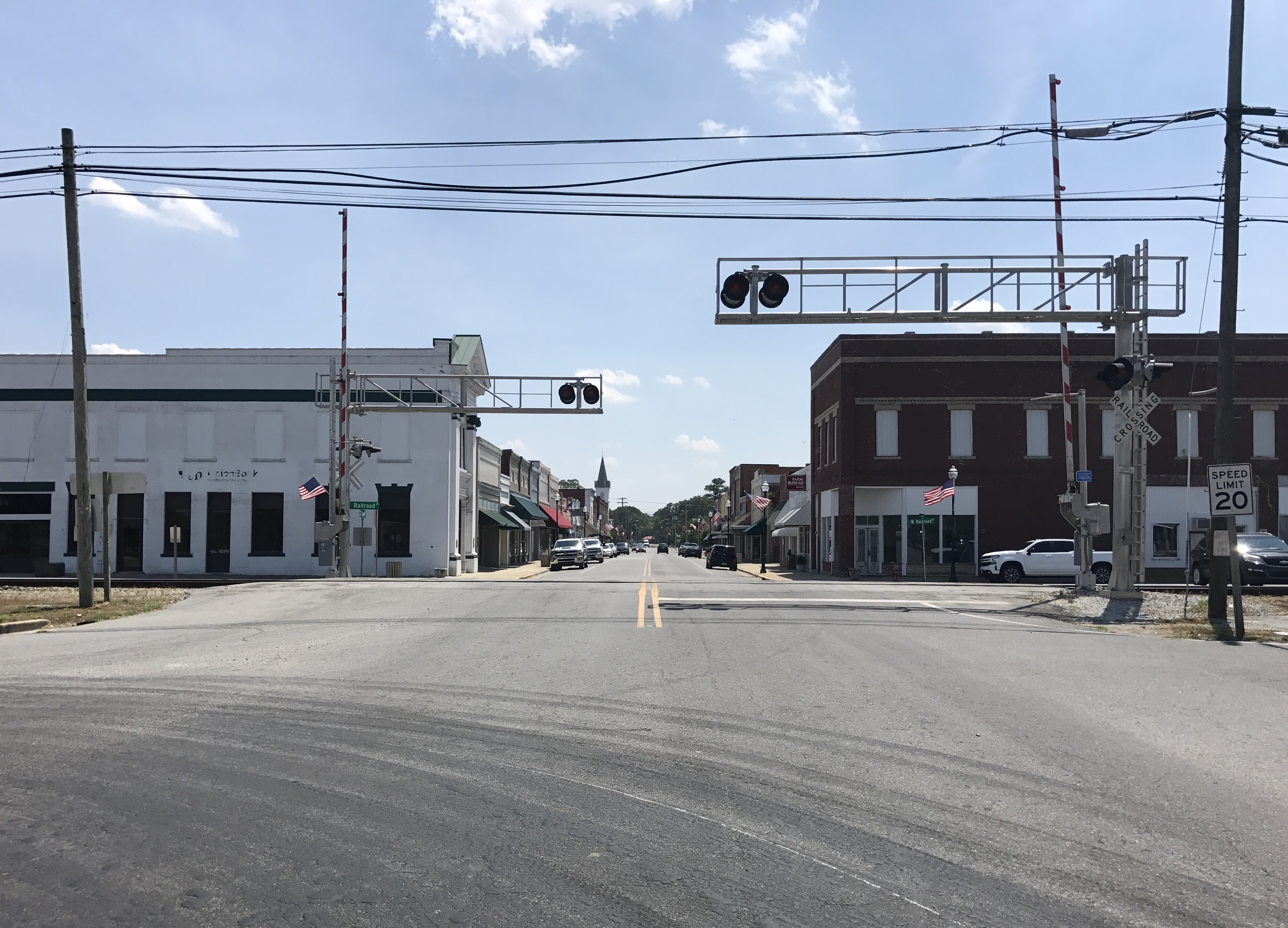
- Southbound NC 903 as it crosses the railroad tracks in La Grange.

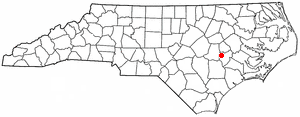
- Location of La Grange, North Carolina
- Coordinates: 35°18′23″N 77°47′20″W
- Country: United States
- State: North Carolina
- County: Lenoir
- Named for: Château de la Grange-Bléneau

Area
  - Total: 2.31 sq mi (5.99 km^{2})
  - Land: 2.31 sq mi (5.97 km^{2})
  - Water: 0.0077 sq mi (0.02 km^{2})
- Elevation: 108 ft (33 m)

Population (2020)
  - Total: 2,595
  - Density: 1,126.6/sq mi (434.97/km^{2})
- Time zone: UTC-5 (Eastern (EST))
  - Summer (DST): UTC-4 (EDT)
- ZIP code: 28551
- Area code: 252
- FIPS code: 37-36400
- GNIS feature ID: 2405964
- Website: www.lagrangenc.com

La Grange is a town in Lenoir County, North Carolina, United States. The population was 2,595 based on the 2020 census. La Grange is located in North Carolina's Inner Banks region.

== Geography ==
According to the United States Census Bureau, the town has a total area of 2.3 square miles (6.0 km^{2}), of which 2.3 square miles (6.0 km^{2}) is land and 0.44% is water.

== History ==
La Grange was named for the French estate of the Marquis de Lafayette, the Château de la Grange-Bléneau. The Herring House, La Grange Presbyterian Church, and La Grange Historic District are listed on the National Register of Historic Places.

== Demographics ==
Historical population
Census	Pop.	Note	%±
1880	522		—
1890	775		48.5%
1900	853		10.1%
1910	1,007		18.1%
1920	1,399		38.9%
1930	1,500		7.2%
1940	1,647		9.8%
1950	1,852		12.4%
1960	2,133		15.2%
1970	2,679		25.6%
1980	3,147		17.5%
1990	2,805		−10.9%
2000	2,844		1.4%
2010	2,873		1.0%
2020	2,595		−9.7%
U.S. Decennial Census

=== 2020 census ===
As of the 2020 census, La Grange had a population of 2,595, with 1,133 households and 732 families. The median age was 43.5 years. 23.1% of residents were under the age of 18 and 22.9% were 65 years of age or older. For every 100 females, there were 82.6 males, and for every 100 females age 18 and over, there were 78.9 males age 18 and over.

0.0% of residents lived in urban areas, while 100.0% lived in rural areas.

Of the 1,133 households, 29.8% had children under the age of 18 living in them. 33.7% were married-couple households, 16.9% were households with a male householder and no spouse or partner present, and 42.4% were households with a female householder and no spouse or partner present. About 33.4% of all households were made up of individuals, and 18.7% had someone living alone who was 65 years of age or older.

There were 1,342 housing units, of which 15.6% were vacant. The homeowner vacancy rate was 2.2% and the rental vacancy rate was 7.3%.

La Grange racial composition
Race	Number	Percentage
White (non-Hispanic)	1,005	38.73%
Black or African American (non-Hispanic)	1,342	51.71%
Native American	8	0.31%
Asian	18	0.69%
Pacific Islander	1	0.04%
Other/Mixed	96	3.7%
Hispanic or Latino	125	4.82%

=== 2000 census ===
As of the census of 2000, there were 2,844 people, 1,211 households, and 768 families residing in the town. The population density was 1,256.4 inhabitants per square mile (485.1/km^{2}). There were 1,330 housing units at an average density of 587.6 per square mile (226.9/km^{2}). The racial makeup of the town was 42.86% White, 55.03% African American, 0.35% Asian, 0.04% Pacific Islander, 0.91% from other races, and 0.81% from two or more races. Hispanic or Latino of any race were 1.30% of the population.

There were 1,211 households, out of which 27.6% had children under the age of 18 living with them, 40.5% were married couples living together, 19.7% had a female householder with no husband present, and 36.5% were non-families. 33.6% of all households were made up of individuals, and 15.2% had someone living alone who was 65 years of age or older. The average household size was 2.35 and the average family size was 3.00.

In the town, the population was spread out, with 23.6% under the age of 18, 8.2% from 18 to 24, 27.7% from 25 to 44, 24.8% from 45 to 64, and 15.8% who were 65 years of age or older. The median age was 39 years. For every 100 females, there were 82.4 males. For every 100 females age 18 and over, there were 76.3 males.

The median income for a household in the town was $28,304, and the median income for a family was $38,068. Males had a median income of $26,581 versus $20,212 for females. The per capita income for the town was $14,436. About 14.4% of families and 19.0% of the population were below the poverty line, including 24.6% of those under age 18 and 15.0% of those age 65 or over.

== Education ==
=== Schools ===
La Grange is served by three Public schools which are operated by the Lenoir County Public School system. They include North Lenoir High School, E.B. Frink Middle School and La Grange Elementary School. Higher education is provided through a local branch of Lenoir Community College.

The community was home to La Grange Colored High School. Emmett Bentley Frink was its principal.

=== Library ===
The Neuse Regional Library system is headquartered in Kinston and operates a branch in La Grange.

== Transportation ==
=== Passenger ===
- Air: La Grange is served by the nearby Kinston Regional Jetport (IATA: ISO, ICAO: KISO). Raleigh-Durham International Airport (code RDU) is the closest major airport, with service to more than 45 domestic and international destinations.
- I-42 is the closest Interstate Highway to La Grange and is located 3 miles east of the town.
- The closest Amtrak station is located in Selma.

=== Roads ===
- The main highway in La Grange is US 70, which offers access to the North Carolina coast and I-95.
- NC 903 is the other highway that runs through the town.

== Local events ==
The Garden Spot Festival is a yearly event that is held from September 7–9. The event includes live bands, food, and artistic performances.

== Notable people ==
- The Corsairs, Doo-wop quartet consisting of brothers Jay "Bird," James and Moses Uzzell with cousin George Wooten
- Frank Lucas, famous drug lord and subject of a 2007 motion picture American Gangster
- Sam Shepherd, Venezuelan Olympic basketball player
