= Granite Quarry, North Carolina =

- Town
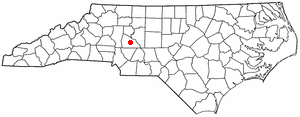
- Location of Granite Quarry, North Carolina
- Coordinates: 35°36′47″N 80°26′55″W
- Country: United States
- State: North Carolina
- County: Rowan

Area
  - Total: 2.92 sq mi (7.56 km^{2})
  - Land: 2.92 sq mi (7.56 km^{2})
  - Water: 0 sq mi (0.00 km^{2})
- Elevation: 781 ft (238 m)

Population (2020)
  - Total: 2,984
  - Density: 1,022.4/sq mi (394.76/km^{2})
- Time zone: UTC-5 (Eastern (EST))
  - Summer (DST): UTC-4 (EDT)
- ZIP code: 28072, 28146
- Area codes: 704, 980
- FIPS code: 37-27440
- GNIS feature ID: 2406602
- Website: http://www.granitequarrync.gov/

Granite Quarry is a town in Rowan County, North Carolina, United States. The population was 2,984 at the 2020 census.

== History ==
Granite Quarry was originally named Woodville when it was founded in the late 1800s. However, the first post office in the town was established under the name of Woodsides in 1891, after a prominent family in the area named Woodsides. The name was officially changed to Woodsides when the town was incorporated on March 7, 1901, by the North Carolina General Assembly. Jerry L. Shuping was the first mayor. The first town meetings were held in an upstairs room in the W. S. Brown store building. What is now the Town Hall Municipal Building was originally built in 1963 by Gemgas, and purchased later by the town.

Soon after the town's incorporation, however, problems arose with mail delivery, since there was already another town in North Carolina named Woodsides. Because of this, in 1902, the post office changed its name to Granite Quarry, after the stone quarried in the area. The town's name was not officially changed until February 5, 1905.

The Michael Braun House and Granite Quarry School are listed on the National Register of Historic Places.

Though town officials have been working to change this since 1990, residents and businesses who get their mail delivered have a Salisbury address because the Granite Quarry post office only has boxes, not delivery. A proposal rejected by the Postal Service would have allowed a Granite Quarry address but a Salisbury zip code. In early November 2015, with the help of U.S. Rep. Richard Hudson, the town persuaded the Postal Service to make the change.

== Geography ==
According to the United States Census Bureau, the town has a total area of 2.3 square miles (6.0 km^{2}), all land.

== Demographics ==
Historical population
Census	Pop.	Note	%±
1910	363		—
1920	466		28.4%
1930	507		8.8%
1940	555		9.5%
1950	591		6.5%
1960	1,059		79.2%
1970	1,344		26.9%
1980	1,294		−3.7%
1990	1,646		27.2%
2000	2,175		32.1%
2010	2,930		34.7%
2020	2,984		1.8%
U.S. Decennial Census

=== 2020 census ===
As of the 2020 census, Granite Quarry had a population of 2,984. The median age was 40.0 years. 24.0% of residents were under the age of 18 and 17.1% of residents were 65 years of age or older. For every 100 females there were 94.1 males, and for every 100 females age 18 and over there were 89.6 males age 18 and over.

98.6% of residents lived in urban areas, while 1.4% lived in rural areas.

There were 1,197 households in Granite Quarry, of which 34.7% had children under the age of 18 living in them. Of all households, 50.2% were married-couple households, 16.6% were households with a male householder and no spouse or partner present, and 26.8% were households with a female householder and no spouse or partner present. About 24.3% of all households were made up of individuals and 11.5% had someone living alone who was 65 years of age or older.

There were 1,290 housing units, of which 7.2% were vacant. The homeowner vacancy rate was 1.8% and the rental vacancy rate was 7.4%.

Granite Quarry racial composition
Race	Number	Percentage
White (non-Hispanic)	2,329	78.05%
Black or African American (non-Hispanic)	263	8.81%
Native American	9	0.3%
Asian	36	1.21%
Pacific Islander	2	0.07%
Other/Mixed	142	4.76%
Hispanic or Latino	203	6.8%

=== 2000 census ===
As of the census of 2000, there were 2,175 people, 871 households, and 627 families residing in the town. The population density was 924.5 people per square mile (357.0 people/km^{2}). There were 940 housing units at an average density of 399.6 per square mile (154.3/km^{2}). The racial makeup of the town was 89.33% White, 8.28% African American, 0.14% Native American, 0.41% Asian, 1.01% from other races, and 0.83% from two or more races. Hispanic or Latino of any race were 5.29% of the population.

There were 871 households, out of which 36.5% had children under the age of 18 living with them, 56.4% were married couples living together, 10.9% had a female householder with no husband present, and 27.9% were non-families. 23.2% of all households were made up of individuals, and 10.6% had someone living alone who was 65 years of age or older. The average household size was 2.50 and the average family size was 2.94.

In the town, the population was spread out, with 26.1% under the age of 18, 8.1% from 18 to 24, 30.6% from 25 to 44, 21.6% from 45 to 64, and 13.7% who were 65 years of age or older. The median age was 37 years. For every 100 females, there were 93.2 males. For every 100 females age 18 and over, there were 91.4 males.

The median income for a household in the town was $41,645, and the median income for a family was $48,750. Males had a median income of $32,286 versus $26,285 for females. The per capita income for the town was $18,633. About 6.4% of families and 7.8% of the population were below the poverty line, including 8.6% of those under age 18 and 11.3% of those age 65 or over.

== Education ==
Area students attending public schools are served by the Rowan–Salisbury School System. The schools that generally serve the town include:

- East Rowan High School – Mustangs
- Charles Columbus Erwin Middle School – Eagles
- Granite Quarry Elementary School – Dragons

== Notable person ==
- Vern Benson, Major League Baseball player and coach
