= Conway, North Carolina =

- Town
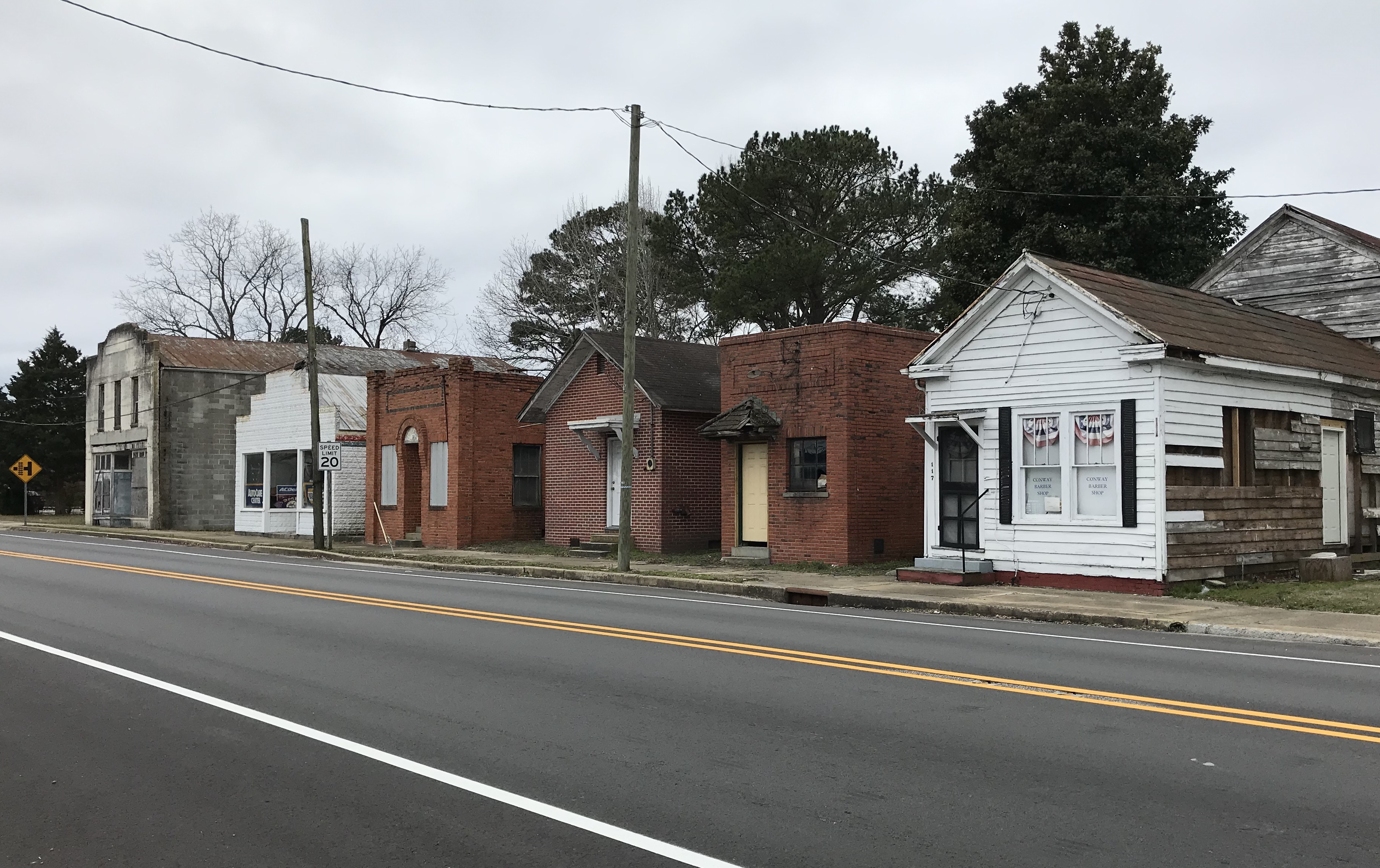
- Commercial buildings on South Church Street

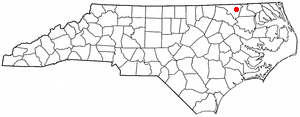
- Location of Conway, North Carolina
- Coordinates: 36°26′14″N 77°13′44″W
- Country: United States
- State: North Carolina
- County: Northampton

Area
  - Total: 1.82 sq mi (4.72 km^{2})
  - Land: 1.82 sq mi (4.72 km^{2})
  - Water: 0 sq mi (0.00 km^{2})
- Elevation: 102 ft (31 m)

Population (2020)
  - Total: 752
  - Density: 412.4/sq mi (159.21/km^{2})
- Time zone: UTC-5 (Eastern (EST))
  - Summer (DST): UTC-4 (EDT)
- ZIP code: 27820
- Area code: 252
- FIPS code: 37-14400
- GNIS feature ID: 2406307
- Website: https://www.townofconwaync.com/

Conway is a town in Northampton County, North Carolina, United States. As of the 2020 census, Conway had a population of 752. It is part of the Roanoke Rapids, North Carolina Micropolitan Statistical Area.

== Geography ==
According to the United States Census Bureau, the town has a total area of 1.8 square miles (4.7 km^{2}), all land.

== Demographics ==
Historical population
Census	Pop.	Note	%±
1920	294		—
1930	400		36.1%
1940	449		12.3%
1950	618		37.6%
1960	662		7.1%
1970	694		4.8%
1980	678		−2.3%
1990	759		11.9%
2000	734		−3.3%
2010	836		13.9%
2020	752		−10.0%
U.S. Decennial Census

=== 2020 census ===
Conway racial composition
Race	Number	Percentage
White (non-Hispanic)	369	49.07%
Black or African American (non-Hispanic)	338	44.95%
Native American	1	0.13%
Asian	1	0.13%
Other/Mixed	27	3.59%
Hispanic or Latino	16	2.13%

As of the 2020 United States census, there were 752 people, 306 households, and 221 families residing in the town.

=== 2010 census ===
As of the 2010 United States census, there were 836 people living in the town. The racial makeup of the town was 48.6% White, 47.7% Black and 1.3% from two or more races. 2.4% were Hispanic or Latino of any race.

=== 2000 census ===
As of the census of 2000, there were 734 people, 328 households, and 205 families living in the town. The population density was 406.0 inhabitants per square mile (156.8/km^{2}). There were 356 housing units at an average density of 196.9 per square mile (76.0/km^{2}). The racial makeup of the town was 65.53% White, 33.24% African American, 0.54% Native American, and 0.68% from two or more races. Hispanic or Latino of any race were 0.27% of the population.

There were 328 households, out of which 27.7% had children under the age of 18 living with them, 41.8% were married couples living together, 18.0% had a female householder with no husband present, and 37.5% were non-families. 35.1% of all households were made up of individuals, and 14.9% had someone living alone who was 65 years of age or older. The average household size was 2.24 and the average family size was 2.88.

In the town, the population was spread out, with 24.5% under the age of 18, 7.2% from 18 to 24, 23.7% from 25 to 44, 25.6% from 45 to 64, and 18.9% who were 65 years of age or older. The median age was 42 years. For every 100 females, there were 75.6 males. For every 100 females age 18 and over, there were 66.9 males.

The median income for a household in the town was $23,250, and the median income for a family was $27,386. Males had a median income of $26,932 versus $21,538 for females. The per capita income for the town was $14,969. About 24.9% of families and 24.1% of the population were below the poverty line, including 36.3% of those under age 18 and 21.1% of those age 65 or over.

== Notable people ==
- Stu Flythe, former MLB player
- Fred Vinson, former NBA player and current coach
