= List of displayed Lockheed T-33 Shooting Stars =

== Aircraft on display ==
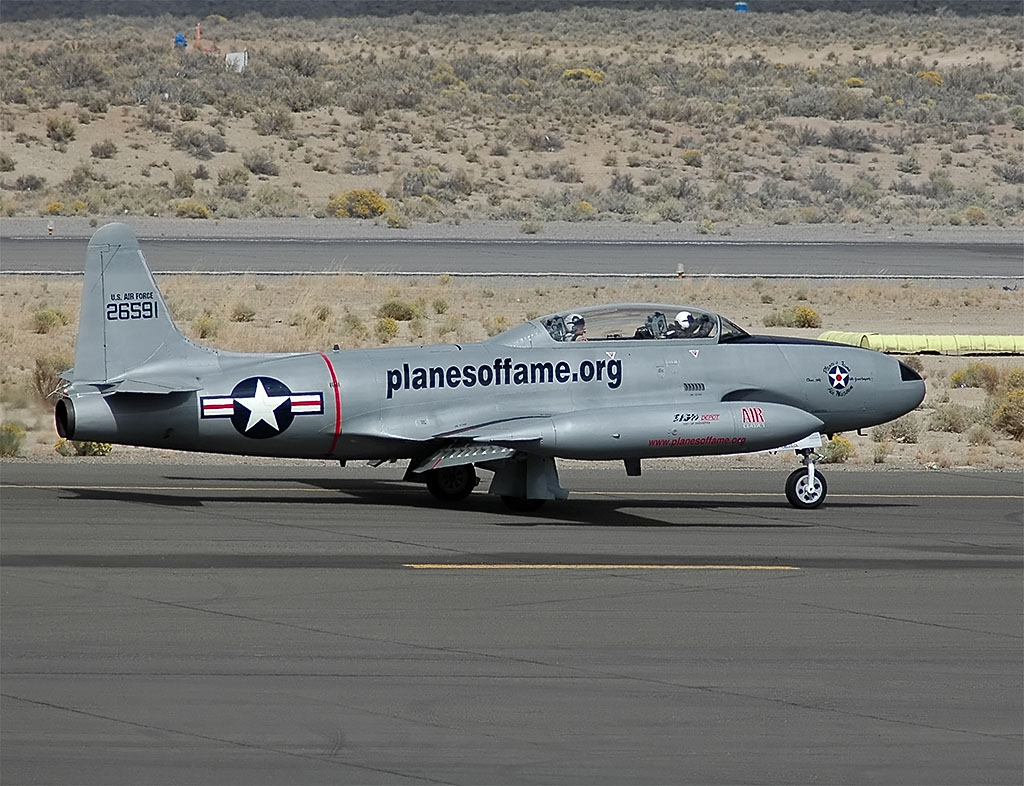
A Lockheed T-33 in Reno, Nevada in 2004

Numerous T-33s have been preserved as museum and commemorative displays including:

=== Albania ===
On display

- RT-33A 51-4413 of the USAF was forced to land in December 1957 at Rinas Airport (Albania) after being intercepted by two Albanian MiG-15bis - on display at Gjirokastra Museum.

=== Belgium ===
On display

- T-33 FT-25 (ex-USAF 53-5724) in Wetteren.
- T-33 FT-34 (ex-USAF 55-3043/TR-043) of the Belgian Air Force at the Royal Museum of the Armed Forces and Military History in Brussels

=== Brazil ===
On display

- T-33A - FAB4313 on display at Museu Asas de um Sonho in Itú, São Paulo.
- T-33A - FAB4323 on display at Museu Matarazzo in Bebedouro, São Paulo.
- T-33A - FAB4364 on display at Museu Aeroespacial - Musal in Rio de Janeiro.
- Unknown T-33 - Assis Airport in Assis.
- Unknown T-33 - Brazilian Air Force Base in Fortaleza.

=== Burma ===
On display

- Unknown T-33 - Armed Forces Museum in Yangon.

=== Canada ===
Most examples in Canada are Canadair CT-133 Silver Stars.

On display

- T-33A 53-5413 of the United States Air Force at Happy Valley, Goose Bay.

=== China ===
On display

- A former Republic of China (Taiwan) Air Force Lockheed T-33A #3024 on static display (partially wrecked) at the Military Museum of the Chinese People's Revolution in Beijing. This aircraft fell into Chinese hands when a lieutenant of the ROC Air Force defected to mainland China by flying the aircraft there during the Cold War.

=== Denmark ===
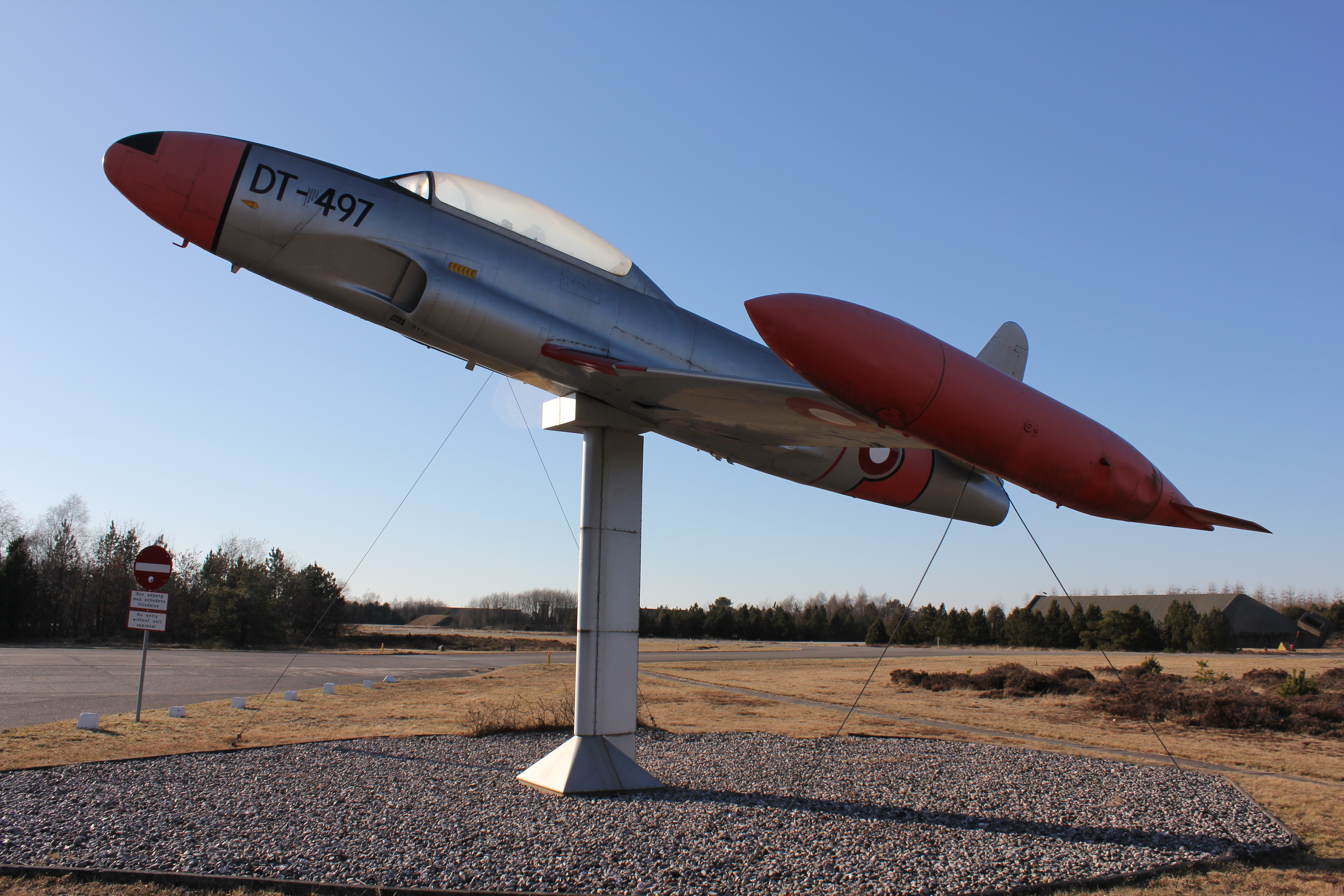
T-33A Royal Danish Air Force - Now gate guard at the Air Force Flying School

On display

- T-33A RDAF DT-102 at Danmarks Flymuseum, Stauning.
- T-33A RDAF DT-289 at Garnisonsmuseet, Aalborg.
- T-33A RDAF DT-491 at Danmarks Tekniske Museum, Helsingør.
- T-33A RDAF DT-497 a Gate Guard at RDAF Flying School.
- T-33A RDAF DT-905 at Gedhus museum.

Stored or under restoration

- T-33A RDAF DT-104 in storage at Aalborg Air Force Base.
- T-33A RDAF DT-884 under restoration at Skrydstrup Air Force Base.
- T-33A RDAF DT-923 in storage at Danmarks Tekniske Museum, Helsingør.

=== Greece ===
On display

- T-33A TR-516 in the Hellenic Air Force Museum.
- T-33A TR-029 in the Hellenic Air Force Museum.
- T-33A TR-516 in Elatia Lokridos, near Lamia.
- T-33 TR-876 near Akrotiri, Crete.

=== Germany ===
On display

- T-33A-1-LO (53-5628) 94+47 at Deutsches Museum Flugwerft Schleißheim near Munich.
- T-33A-1-LO (51-17471) 94+01 painted as USAF T-33A-5-LO 56-3659 at Technik Museum Speyer, Speyer.
- T-33A-1-LO (53-5781) 9455 at Militärhistorisches Museum der Bundeswehr - Flugplatz Berlin-Gatow, Berlin.
- T-33A-1-LO (54-1535) 94+64 at Internationales Luftfahrtmuseum, Villingen-Schwenningen.

=== Indonesia ===
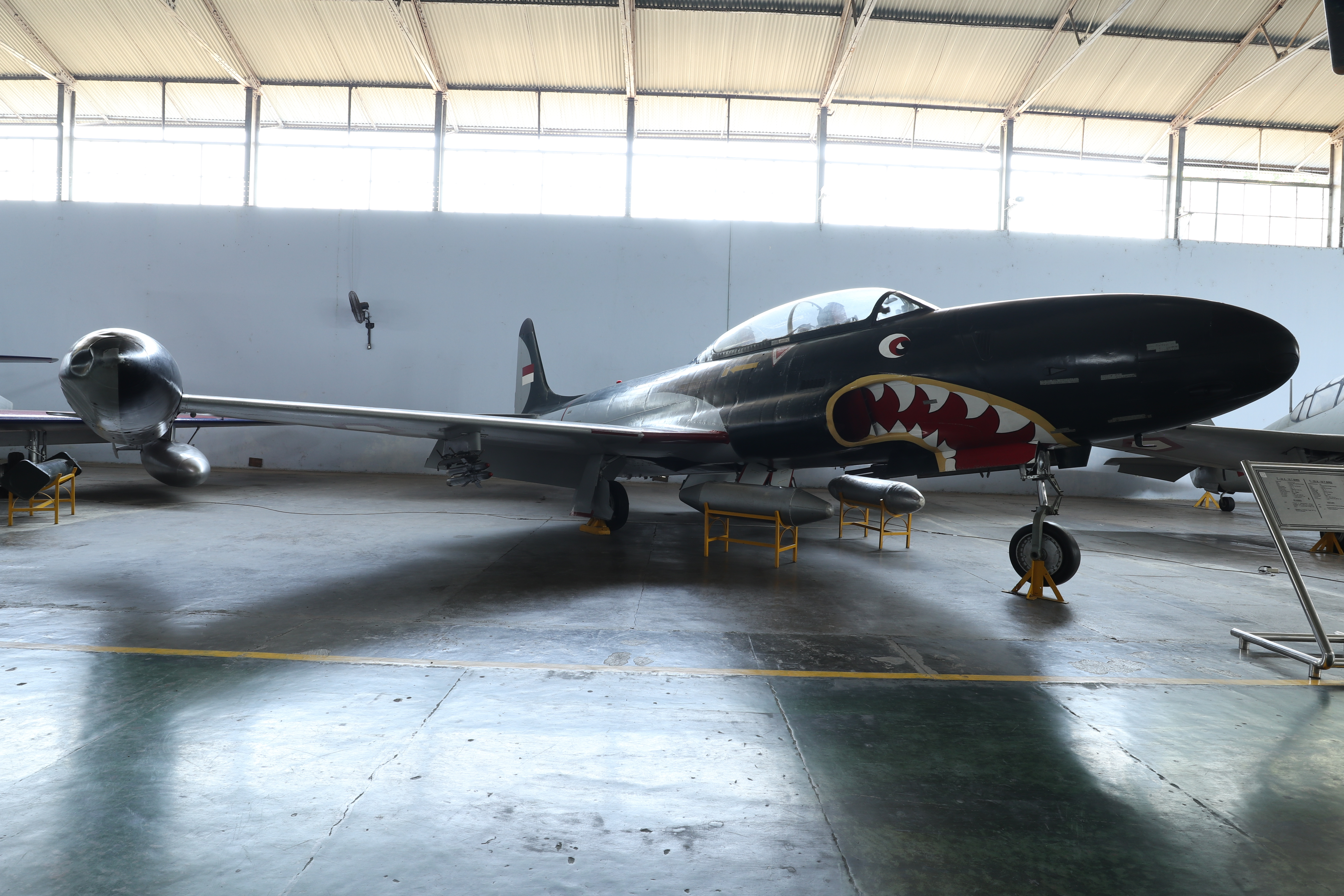
Indonesian Air Force T-33A TS-3334 on display at Dirgantara Mandala Museum

.

On display

- T-33A TS-3326 at Iswahyudi Air Force Base, Magetan, East Java
- T-33A TS-3333 at Abdul Rachman Saleh Air Force Base, Malang, East Java
- T-33A TS-3334 at Dirgantara Mandala Museum, Sleman Regency, Special Region of Yogyakarta

=== Italy ===
On display

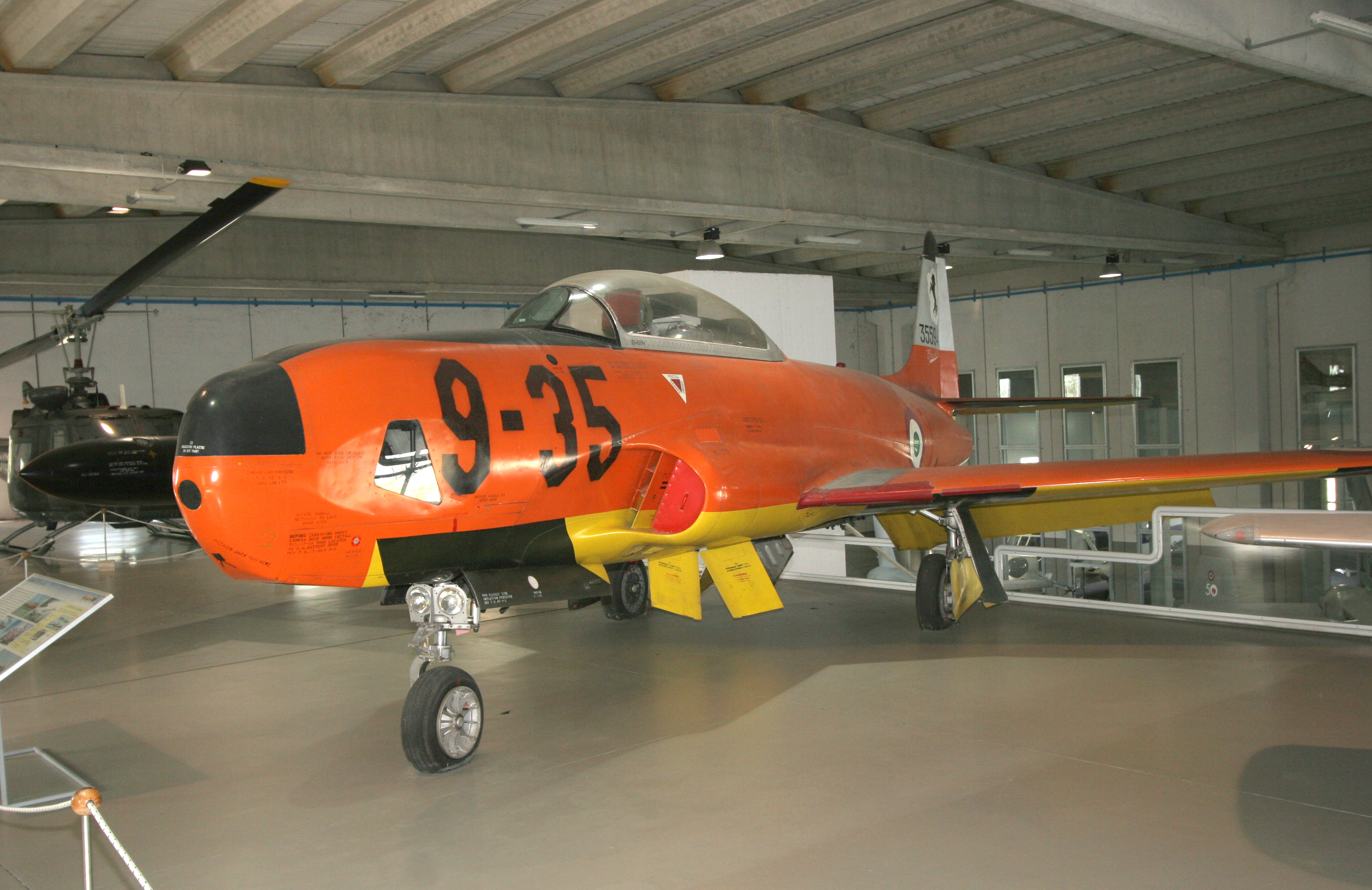
Lockheed T-33A Shooting Star, Museo Storico Aeronautica Militare

- T-33A 9-35, 35594 at Museo storico dell'Aeronautica Militare, Vigna di Valle.

=== Japan ===
On display

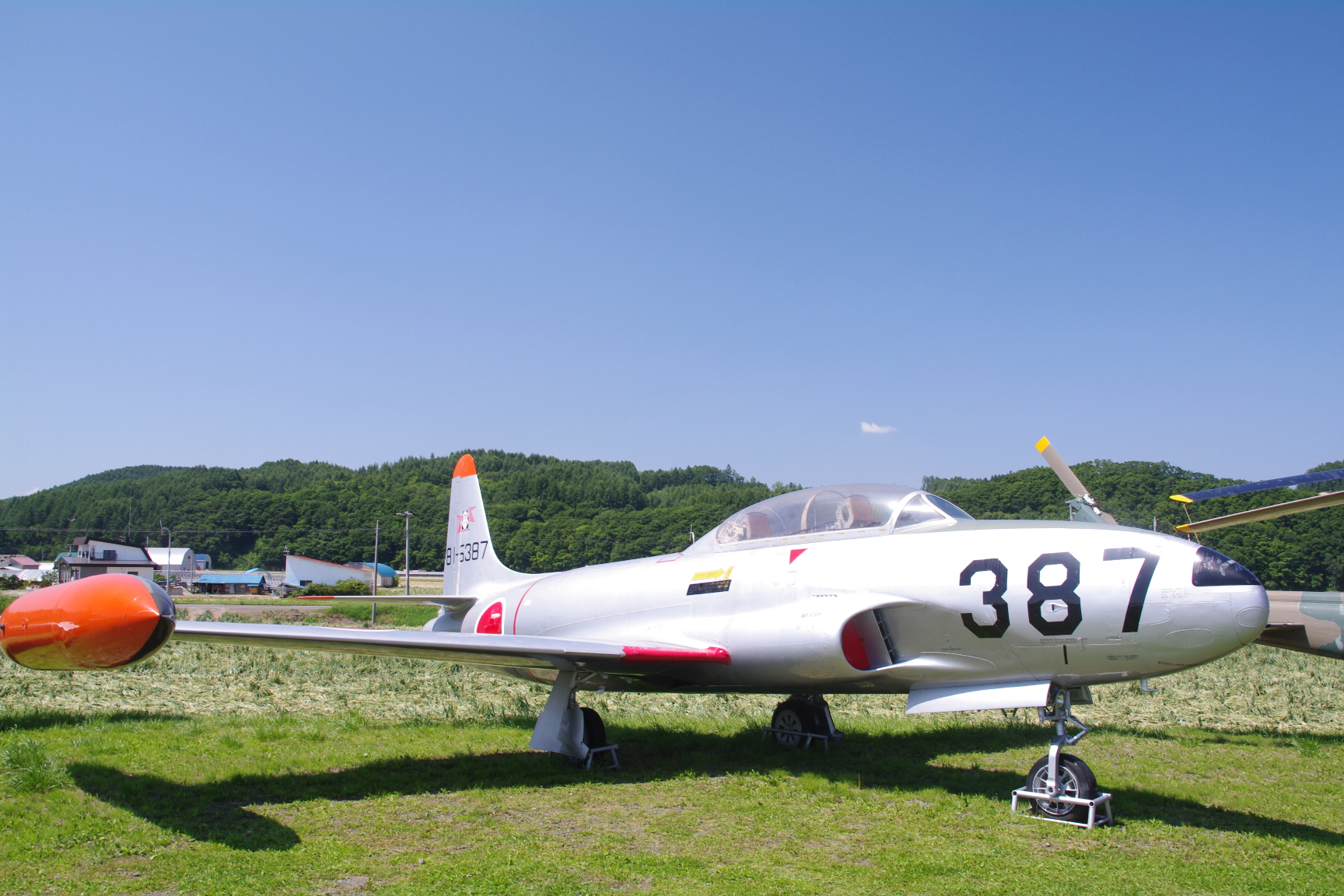
Japan Air Self-Defense Force T-33A at Bihoro Aviation Park, Hokkaido

- T-33A 61-5221 of the JASDF Air Development and Test Command at the Kakamigahara Aerospace Science Museum, Kakamigahara, Gifu.
- T-33A 71-5293 of the JASDF 8th Air Wing at the Amagi Railway Amagi Line Tachiarai Station, Chikuzen, Fukuoka.
- T-33A 51-5639 of the JASDF at Kawaguchiko Motor Museum, Minamitsuru District, Yamanashi prefecture.
- T-33A 81-5386 of the JASDF at Bihoro Aviation Park in Hokkaido.

=== Mexico ===
- Various T-33s are on static display at the Mexican Air Force Museum, Mexican Army and Air Force Museum and individual air bases.
- Unknown T-33 4019 - Base Aérea Militar No. 4 General Eduardo Aldasoro Suárez in San Miguel de Cozumel.

=== Netherlands ===
- T-33A 51-4384 / M-50 is in storage at the Nationaal Militair Museum, Soesterberg.
- T-33A 51-9028 / M-5 is in storage at the Nationaal Militair Museum, Soesterberg.

=== Norway ===
On display

- T-33A 117546 of the Royal Norwegian Air Force at the Norwegian Armed Forces Aircraft Collection, Oslo Airport, Gardermoen near Oslo.
- T-33A DT-571 of the Royal Danish Air Force painted as 16571 of the Royal Norwegian Air Force at Flyhistorisk Museum, Sola, Stavanger Airport, Sola, near Stavanger.

=== Pakistan ===
On Display

- T-33A (53-5259) at the PAF Museum in Karachi.
- RT-33 (53-5090) at the Army Museum Lahore.
- T-33 (56-1601) at PAF Base Masroor.
- T-33A at the Islamabad AHQ.

=== Peru ===
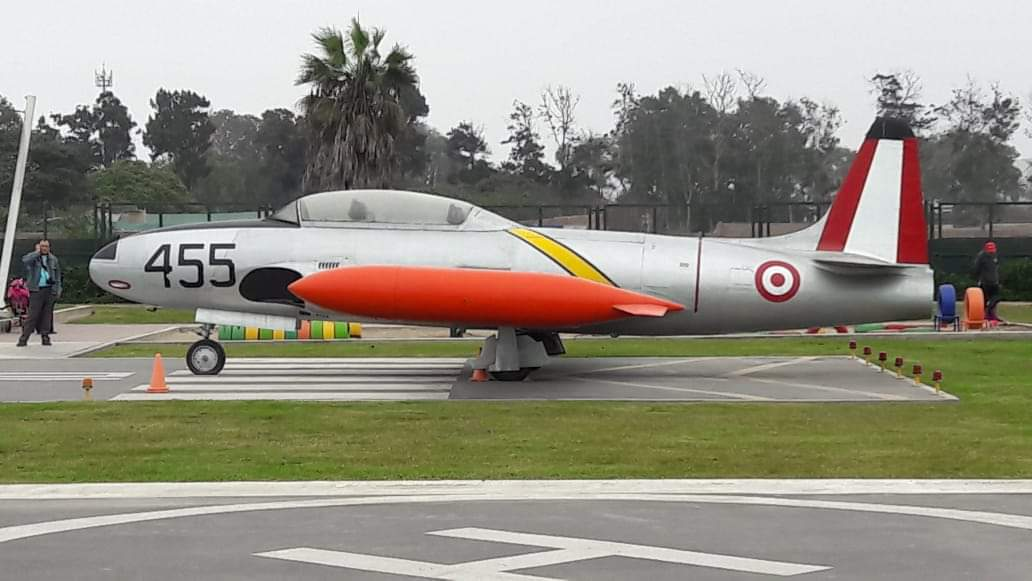
T-33A-1-LO FAP-455 of the Peruvian Air Force, preserved at Parque del Aire.

On display

- T-33A-1-LO FAP-455 (ex-USAF 55-4445, c/n 580-9889) preserved at Parque del Aire, Lima.

=== Philippines ===
RT-33A

- RT-33A serial 53457 at the Cesar Basa Air Base Pampanga Province.

T-33A

- T-33A serial 29806 at the Philippine Air Force Museum at Villamor Air Base.
- T-33A serial 52257 at the Clark Air Base Pampanga Province
- T-33A serial 53636 at the Cesar Basa Air Base in Pampanga Province.
- T-33A serial 29585 at Camp Servillano Aquino Museum in Tarlac Province.

=== Portugal ===
On Display

- T-33A (1923) at the Museu do Ar in Sintra.

=== Saudi Arabia ===
- T-33A on display at the Royal Saudi Air Force Museum, Riyadh.

=== Serbia ===
On display

- T-33A Yugoslav 10024 (ex-USAF 52-9958, c/n 580-8189) at the Yugoslav Aeronautical Museum, Nikola Tesla Airport, Belgrade.

Stored or under restoration

- TV-2 Yugoslav 10242 (ex-USAF 51-4034, ex-USN 126592, c/n 580-5328) at the Yugoslav Aeronautical Museum in Belgrade.

=== Singapore ===
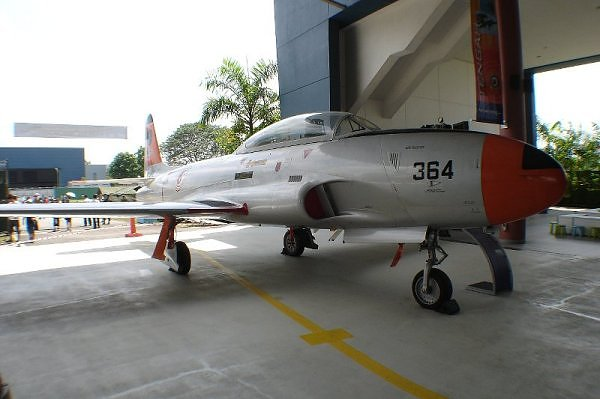
A retired RSAF T-33A 364 on static display

On display

- A T-33A is on static display at the Singapore Air Force Museum.

=== South Korea ===
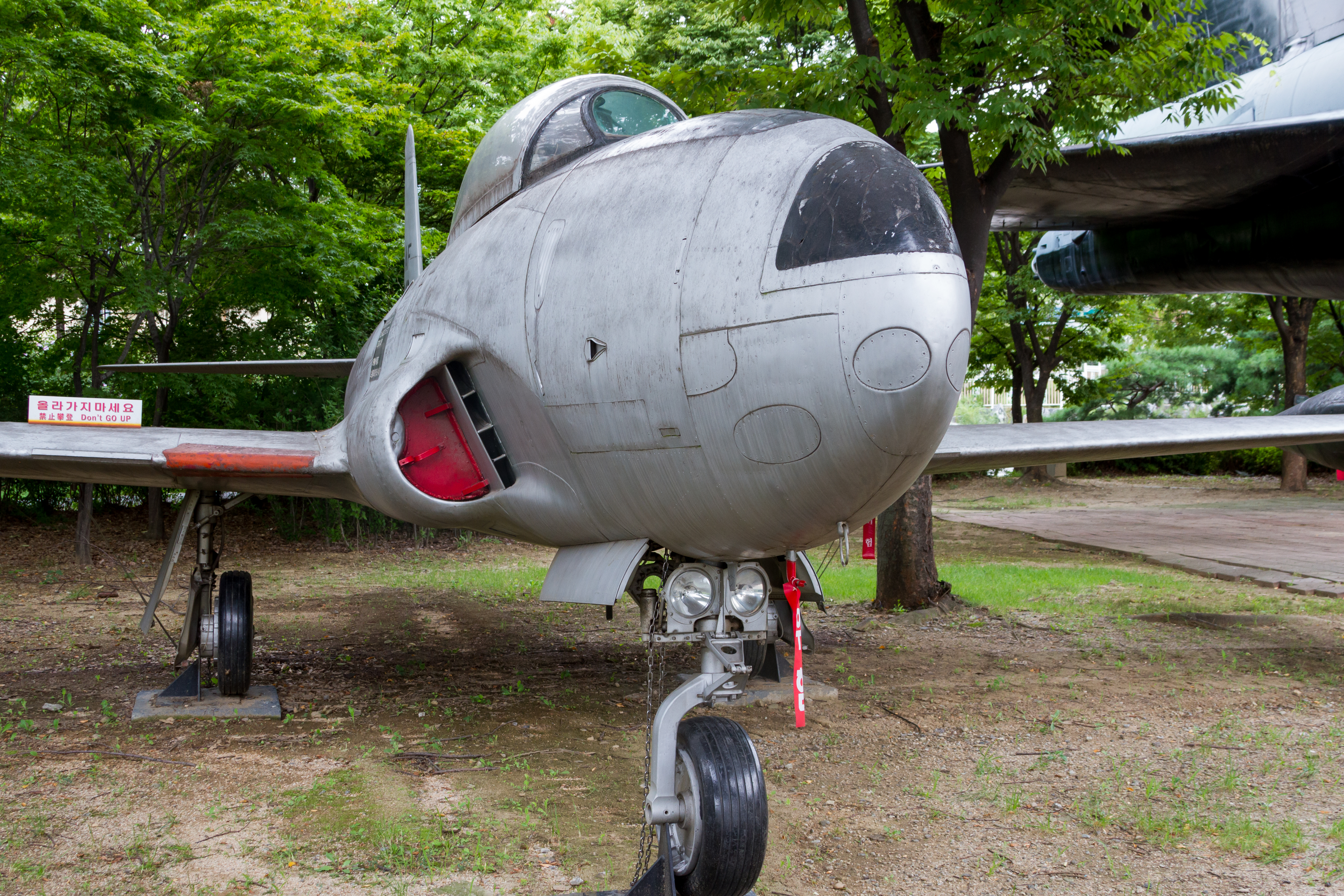
A T-33 Shooting Star at the War Memorial of Korea

On display

- A T-33A on static display at the War Memorial of Korea in Seoul.

=== Spain ===
On display

- T-33A E.15-48 at the Aeronautical Museum of Catalonia (Sabadell Airport).
- T-33A E.15-19, at Santander Airport.
- T-33A, at Reus Airport.

=== Taiwan ===
On display

- T-33, 57-0532 of the Republic of China Air Force at Chung Cheng Aviation Museum.

=== Thailand ===
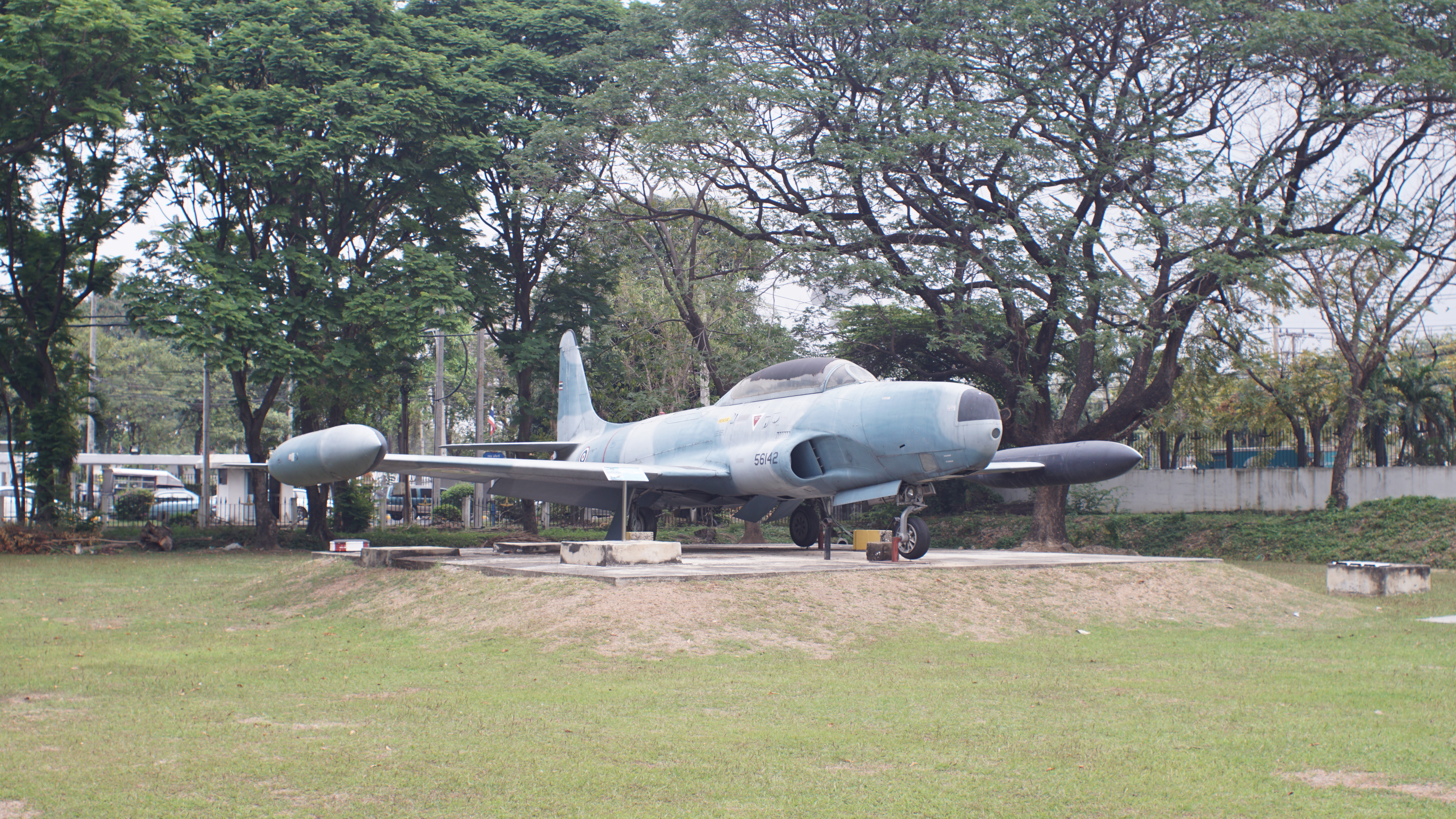
Lockheed T-33 Shooting Stars RTAF in Royal Thai Air Force Museum

On display

- T-33A F11-23/13 of the Royal Thai Air Force at the Royal Thai Air Force Museum, Don Muang AFB.
- T-33A F11-27/13 of the Royal Thai Air Force at Chitladda Palace.

=== Turkey ===
T-33A

- 55-4952 - İnciraltı, İzmir.
- 51-17519 - Çiğli Air Base.
- 52-9919 - Anadolu University.

RT-33A

- 1543/8-543 - Istanbul Aviation Museum.

=== United Kingdom ===
On display

- T-33A 14286 of the French Air Force on display in USAF markings at the American Air Museum, Duxford.
- T-33A 14419 of the French Air Force on display in USAF markings at the Midland Air Museum, Coventry.
- T-33A 17473 of the French Air Force on display in Royal Canadian Air Force markings at the Midland Air Museum, Coventry.
- T-33A 54439 of the French Air Force at the North East Land, Sea and Air Museums, Sunderland.
- T-33A 16718 of the French Air Force on display in USAF markings at City of Norwich Aviation Museum, Norwich.
- T-33A 19252 of the French Air Force under restoration Bentwaters Cold War Museum, Suffolk.
- T-33A 5547 of the United States Air Force in USAF markings at the Newark Air Museum, Nottinghamshire.
- T-33A 54439 of the French Air Force at the South Wales Air Museum, St Athan, Vale of Glamorgan.

=== United States ===
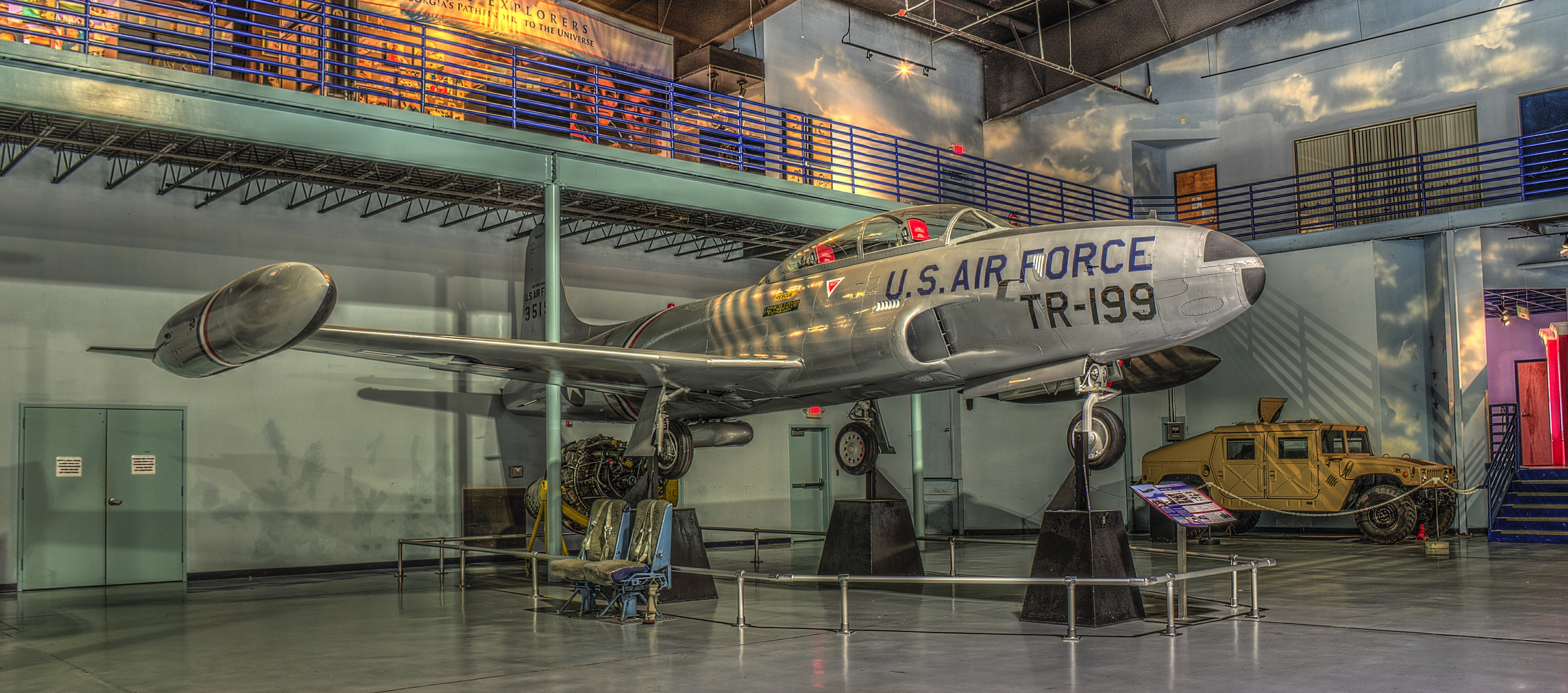
Lockheed T-33A on display at the Museum of Aviation, Robins AFB

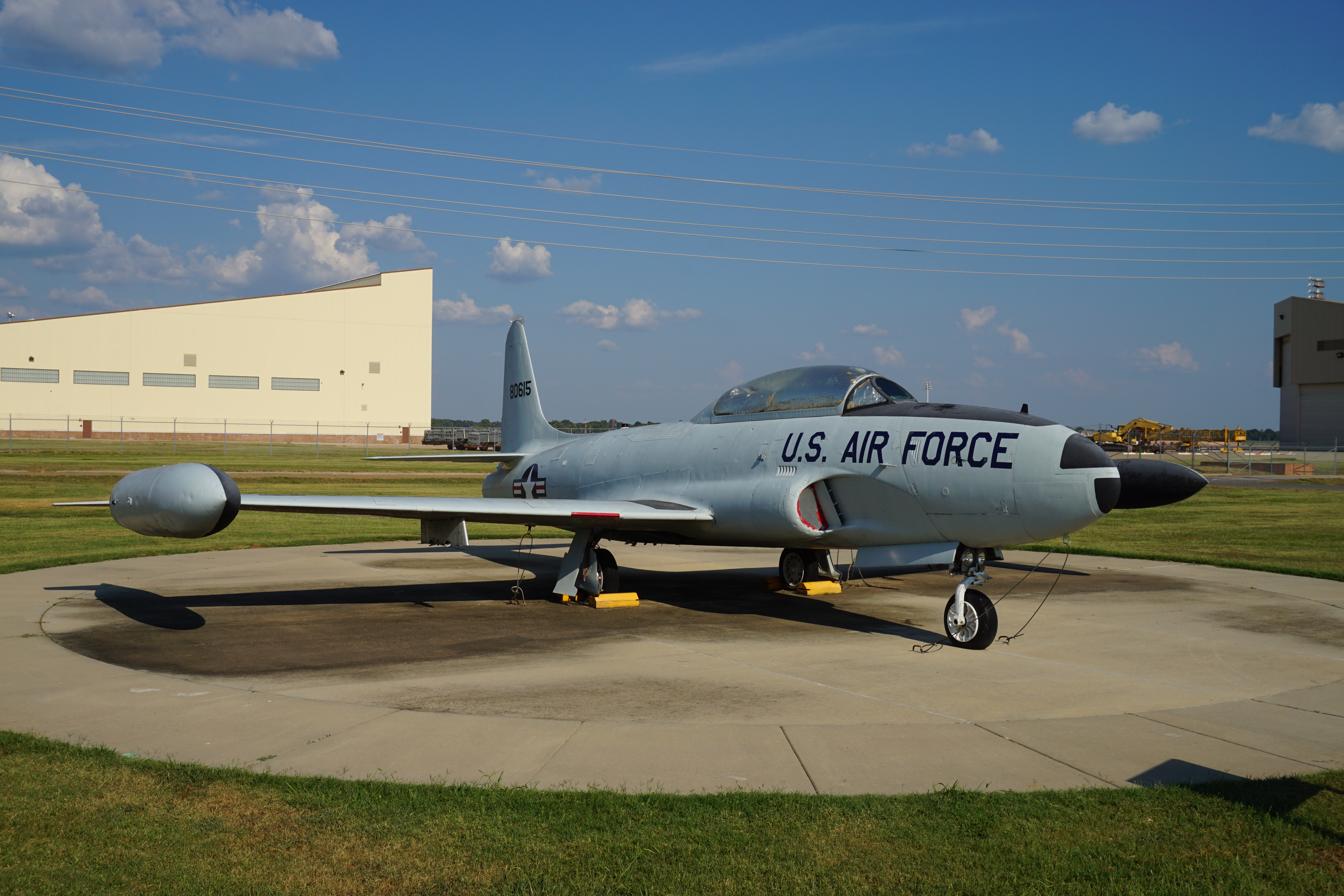
T-33A at the Barksdale Global Power Museum

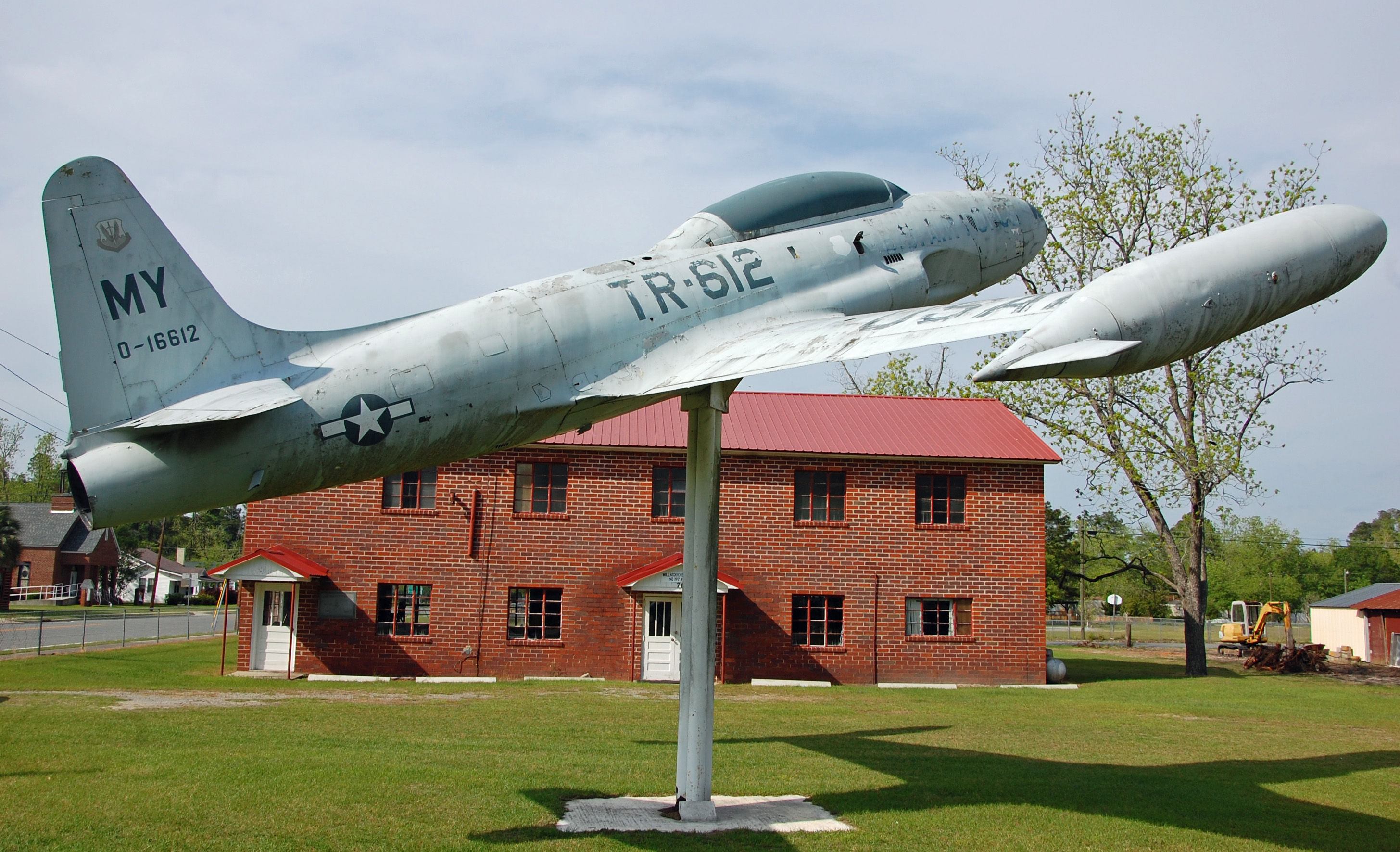
T-33 in Willacoochee, Georgia. A T-33 crashed here ca. 1960s

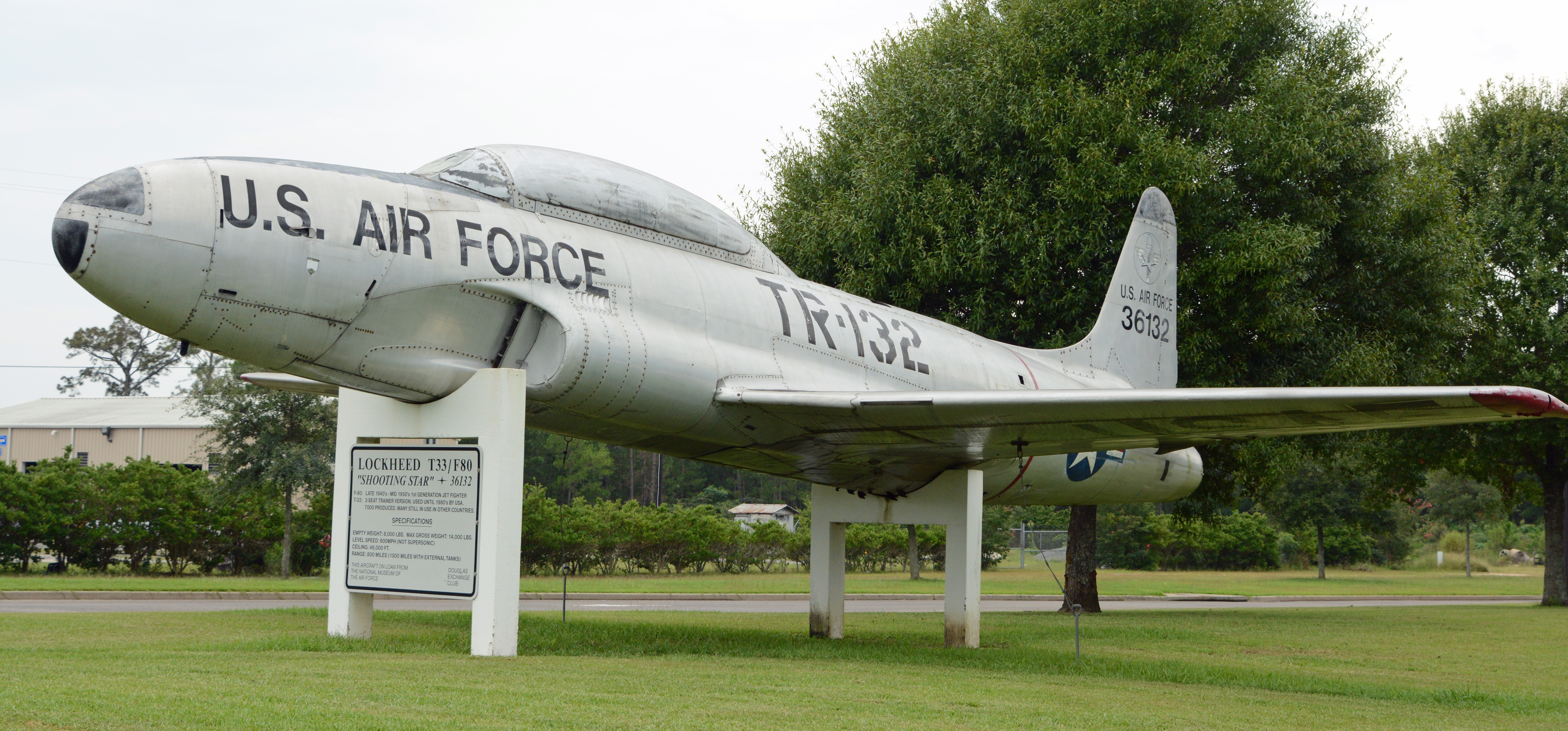
T-33 training aircraft at Douglas, Georgia airport

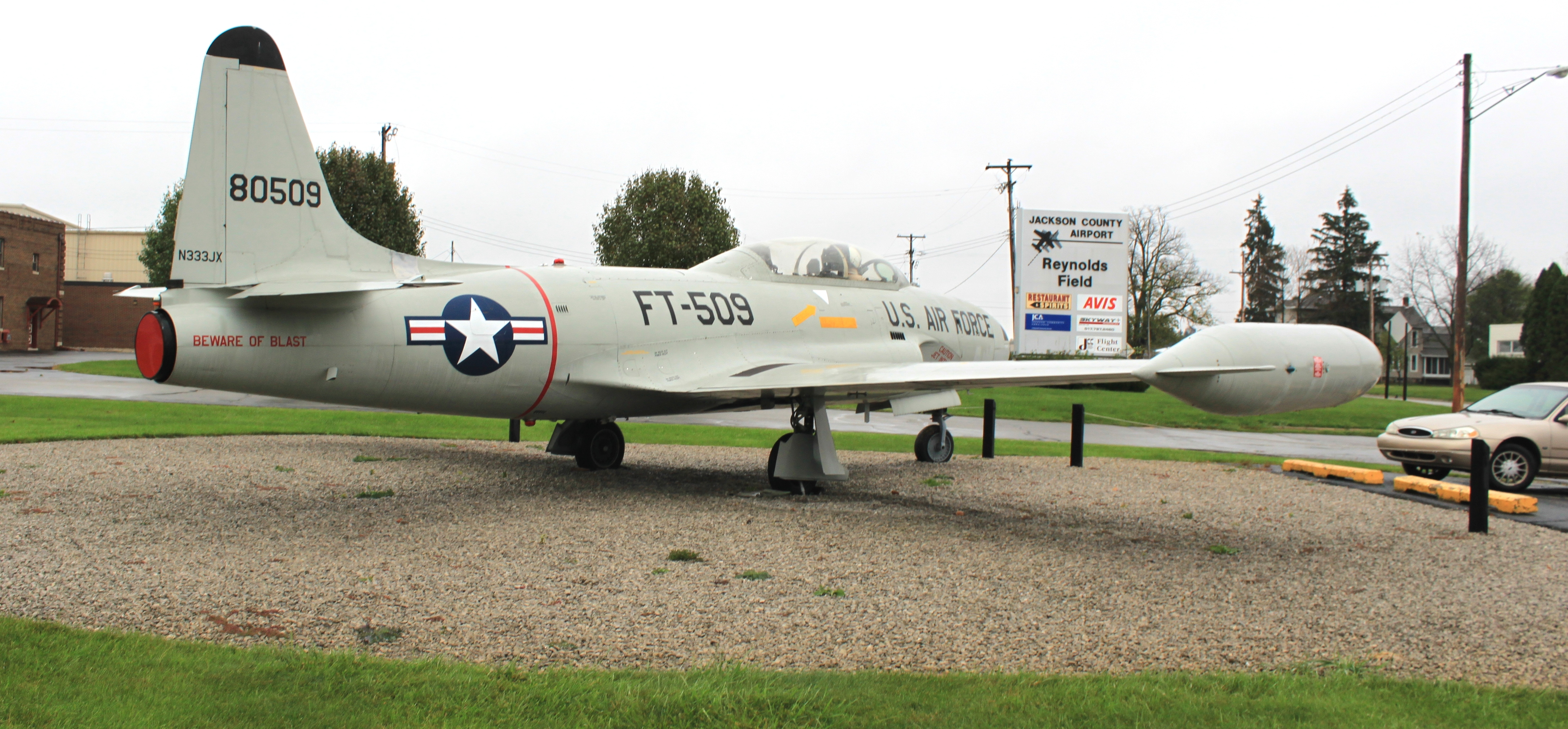
T-33A, Jackson County Airport

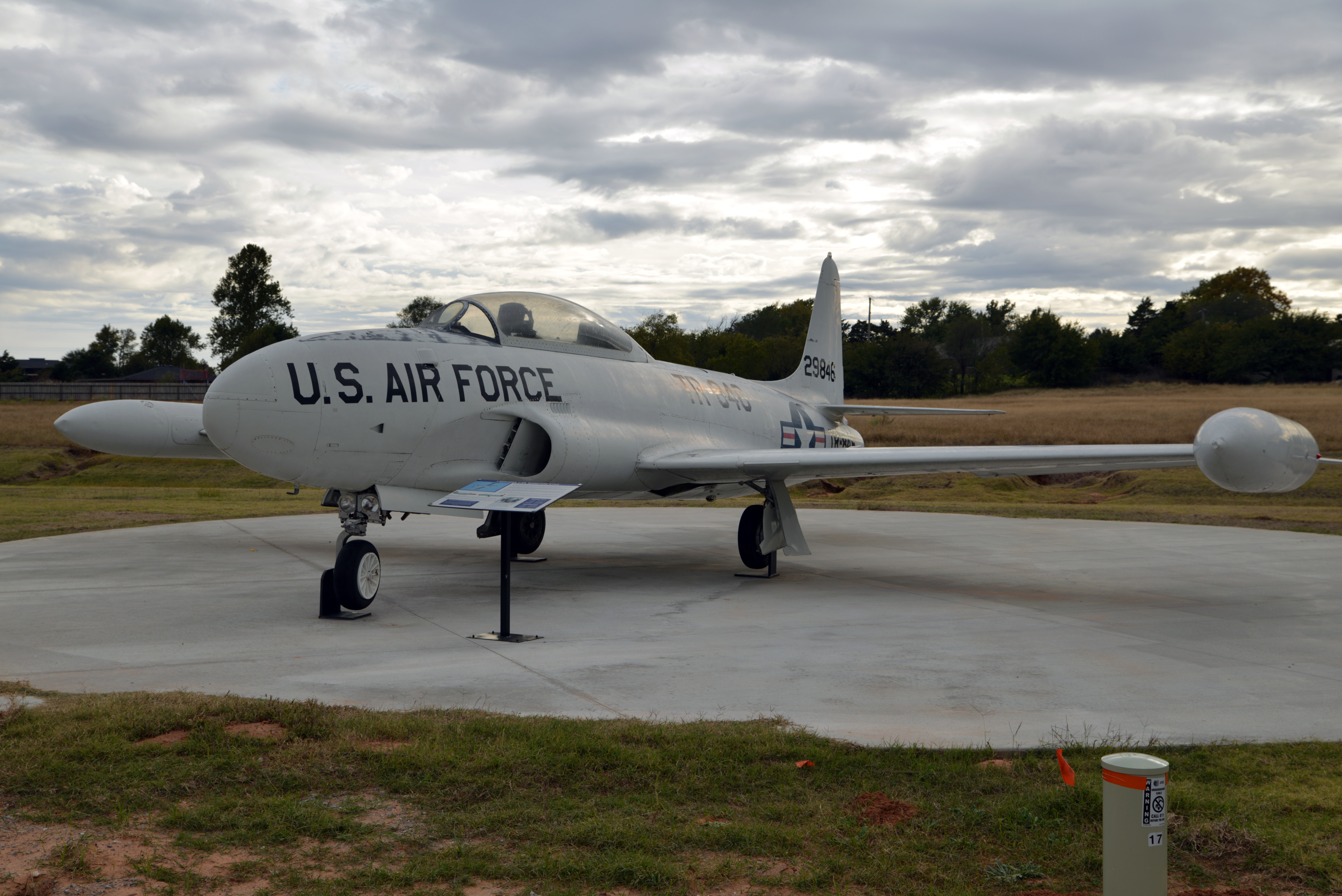
At the Stafford Air & Space Museum

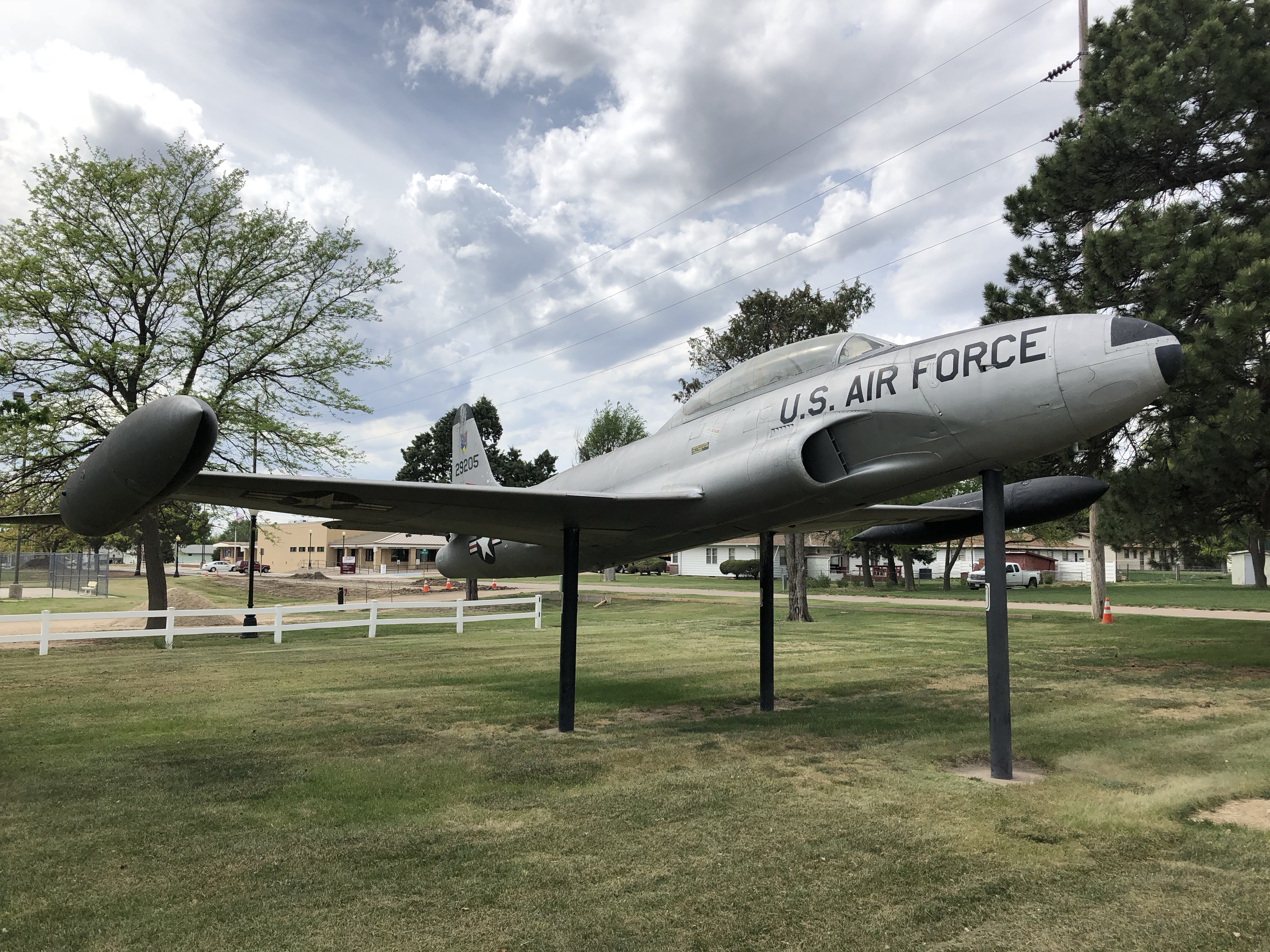
T-33 Serial 52-9205 on display in Franklin, NE

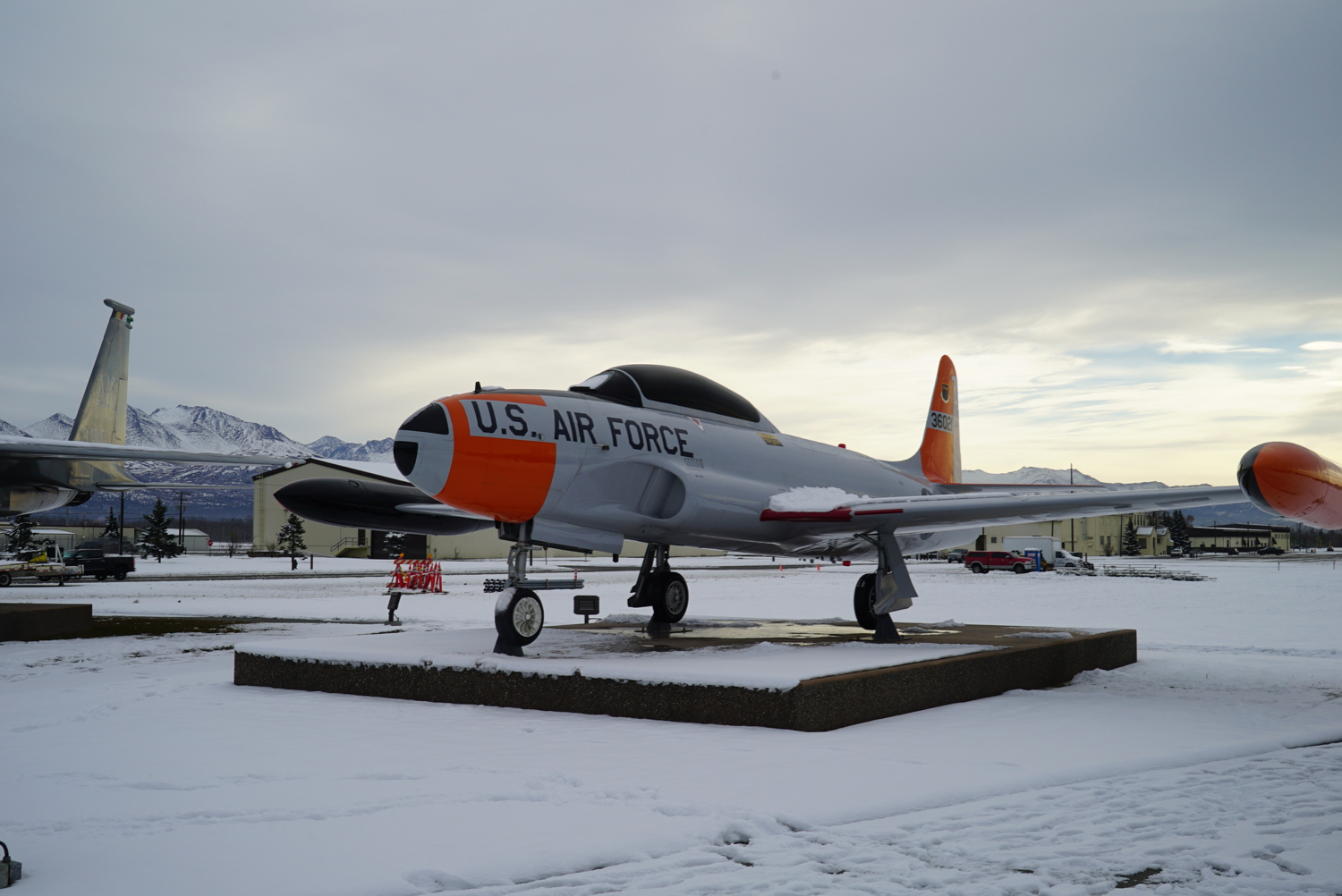
T-33 53-6021 at JBER in Alaska

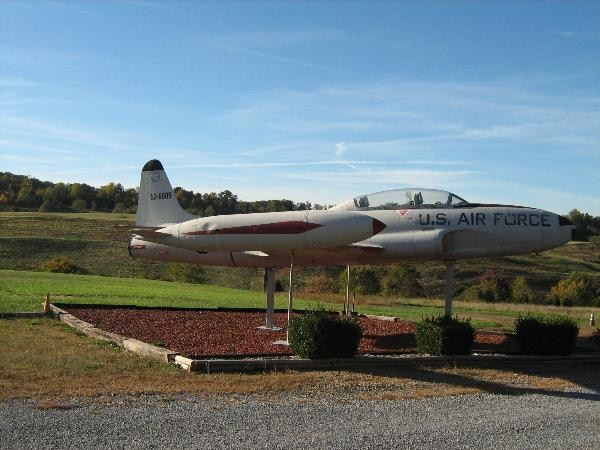
The "Johnson City" T-33a on display at the Johnson City Radio Controllers airfield.

Airworthy

T-33A

- 50-0370 - privately owned in Riverside, California.
- 51-17445 - privately owned in Grove, Oklahoma.
- 51-17463 - privately owned in Concord, North Carolina.
- 51-6581 - Commemorative Air Force-Delta Squadron, General Dewitt Spain Airport, Memphis, Tennessee.
- 51-6953 - Collings Foundation in Stow, Massachusetts.
- 51-8734 - privately owned in Spring Grove, Illinois.
- 51-9127 - Warbird Heritage Foundation in Waukegan, Illinois.
- 56-1749 - privately owned in Leander, Texas.
- 56-1573 - privately owned in Big Spring, Texas.
- 56-3667 - privately owned in Midlothian, Texas.
- 56-3689 - privately owned in Grove, Oklahoma.
- 57-0565 - privately owned in Flathead County, Montana.
- 57-0609 - privately owned in Nickerson, Kansas.
- 58-0471 - privately owned in Midlothian, Texas.
- 58-0665 - privately owned in Leesville, South Carolina.

Display

T-33A

- 51-4300 - Dyess Air Force Base, Abilene, Texas.
- 51-4025 - Spring Lake Park in Texarkana, Texas.
- 51-4067 - American Legion Post 285 in Breckenridge, Michigan.
- 51-4157 - Constitution Park in Cumberland, Maryland.
- 51-4300 - Dyess Air Force Base, Abilene, Texas. Dyess AFB Linear Air Park. Built by the Lockheed Corporation as a T-33A and originally assigned to Big Spring, Texas (AFB) from March, 1952 to February, 1953. It was transferred in 1954 to the 3560th Pilot Training Wing at Webb AFB, Texas where it operated until retired in September 1961. The pylons under the wings were used for ECM gear, chaff dispensers, and test equipment. 7th BW Historian, Dyess AFB.
- 51-4301 - Vance Air Force Base, Enid, Oklahoma.
- 51-4335 - Camp Edwards near Otis Air Force Base in Cape Cod, Massachusetts.
- 51-4505 - Tri-County Airport west of Ahoskie, North Carolina.
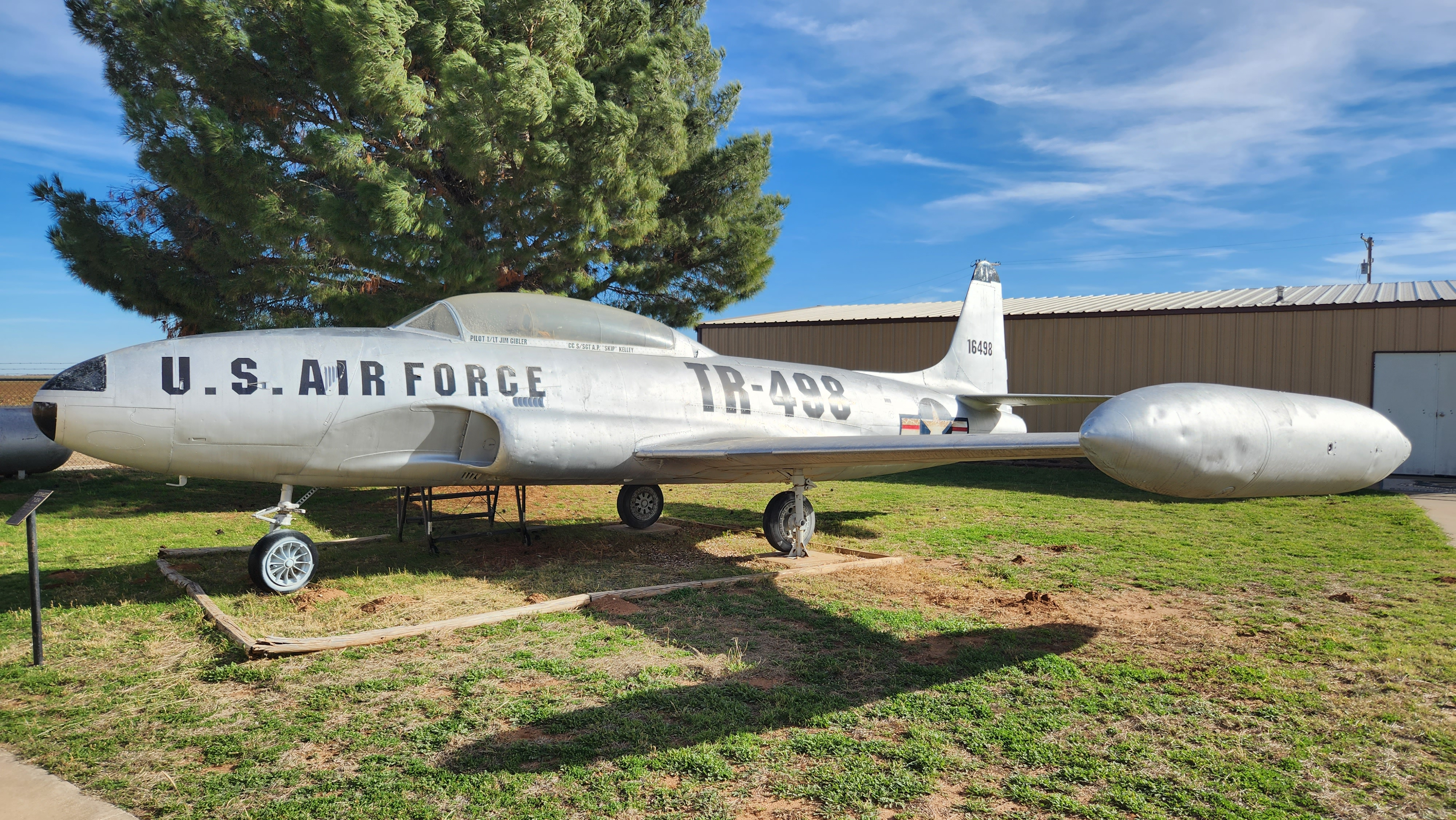
- T-33A on display at the Texas Air Museum in Slaton, Texas.
  51-6495 - Texas Air Museum in Slaton, Texas
- 51-6612 - Masonic Lodge in Willacoochee, Georgia, on U.S. Route 82.
- 51-6635 - American Legion Post 120, Waynesboro, Georgia.
- 51-8627 - EAA Airventure Museum, Wittman Regional Airport, Oshkosh, Wisconsin.
- 51-8513 - Memorial Community Park, New Kensington, Pennsylvania.
- 51-8763 - American Legion Post 106, Grayling, Michigan.
- 51-8880 - Beatrice Municipal Airport, Beatrice, Nebraska.
- 51-9091 - School for Exceptional Children in Houma, Louisiana.
- 51-1900 -Velva City Park, Velva, North Dakota.
- 51-9235 - Buffalo Municipal Airport, Buffalo, Minnesota.
- 51-9263 - City Hall of Brooklyn, Ohio.
- 51-9271 - Hill Aerospace Museum, Hill AFB, Utah.
- 52-5640 - 144th FIW, Fresno Air Terminal, Fresno, CA.
- 52-9171 - American Legion Post 87 at the Alexandria Municipal Airport in Alexandria, Minnesota.
- 52-9202 - Lubbock State School, Lubbock, Texas.
- 52-9205 - Franklin, Nebraska.
- 52-9223 - Ellington Field Joint Reserve Base, Houston Texas.
- 52-9239 - Torrance Airport in Torrance, California.
- 52-9462 - Joplin Regional Airport in Webb City, Missouri.
- 52-9497 - Air Mobility Command Museum, Dover Air Force Base, Delaware.
- 52-9608 - Greenville Mid-Delta Airport, Mississippi.
- 52-9632 - Combat Air Museum, Topeka, Kansas.
- 52-9650 - American Legion Post No. 93 in Pocomoke, Maryland.
- 52-9651 - Fairview Park in Centralia, Illinois.
- 52-9672 - Great Falls International Airport, Great Falls, Montana.
- 52-9785 - Harrison County Airport, Cadiz, Ohio.
- 52-9797 - Fort Wayne Air National Guard Station, Fort Wayne, Indiana. Formerly at Octave Chanute Aerospace Museum, Rantoul, Illinois.
- 52-9842 - Hector Municipal Airport, Hector, Minnesota.
- 52-9846 - Air Force Flight Test Museum beside the United States Air Force Test Pilot School, Edwards Air Force Base, California.
- 53-4932 - Wood County Regional Airport, Bowling Green, Ohio.
- 53-4938 - Lake Jackson Park, Florala, Alabama. Donated by Eglin AFB.
- 53-5073 - Veterans Memorial Park, Hart, Michigan.
- 53-5078 - Veterans Memorial in Young's Park, Dickinson, North Dakota.
- 53-5109 - Tuscaloosa Regional Airport in Tuscaloosa, Alabama.
- 53-5158 - Albert Lea Municipal Airport, Albert Lea, Minnesota.
- 53-5205 - Aerospace Museum of California, McClellan Park (former McClellan AFB) Sacramento, California.
- 53-5215 - Fort Worth Aviation Museum, Fort Worth, Texas.
- 53-5226 - National Air and Space Museum's Steven F. Udvar-Hazy Center in Chantilly, Virginia.
- 53-5421 - modified as a play structure at Oak Meadow Park Los Gatos, California.
- 53-5905 - VFW post 328 in Stoughton; the tail number is erroneously marked "3-0905".
- 53-5916 - Veteran's Memorial Stadium in Cedar Rapids, Iowa.
- 53-5943 - Evergreen Aviation and Space Museum, McMinnville, Oregon.
- 53-5947 - Air Force Armament Museum, Eglin Air Force Base, Florida.
- 53-4967 - Jackson Barracks Military Museum, New Orleans, Louisiana.
- 53-5974 - National Museum of the United States Air Force at Wright-Patterson Air Force Base, Ohio.
- 53-5979 - Prairie Aviation Museum in Bloomington, Illinois.
- 53-5990 - Maurice Roberts Park in Richmond, Missouri.
- 53-6008 - American Legion Post 27, Apache Junction, Arizona.
- 53-6009 - Johnson City Radio Controllers airfield in Johnson City, Tennessee.
- 53-6011 - Tulsa Technology Center (Riverside Campus) Richard Loyd Jones/Riverside Airport; Tulsa, Oklahoma. Formerly operated By NASA Johnson Space Center Houston. Possibly flown by NASA astronauts from 1960-1967.

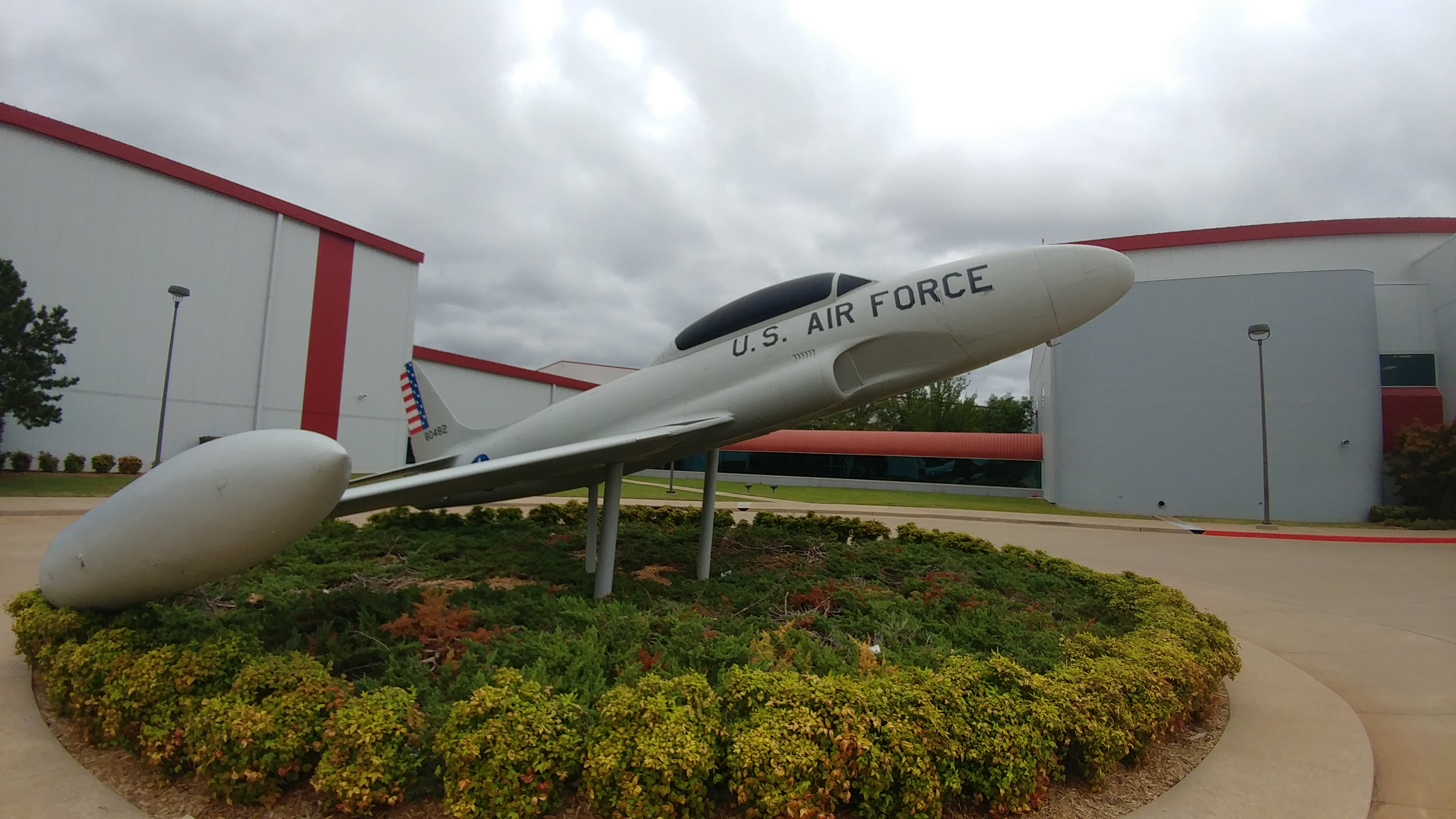
USAF s/n 53-6011 c/n 580-9543 at Tulsa Technology Center-Riverside; Tulsa Oklahoma.

- 53-6021 - Heritage Park, Joint Base Elmendorf-Richardson, Alaska.
- 53-6026 - American Legion 80, near the New Richmond Regional Airport, New Richmond, Wisconsin.
- 53-6038 - Franklin Institute, Philadelphia, Pennsylvania; painted as 0-36038.
- 53-6053 - Tiger Stadium, Louisiana State University Campus, Baton Rouge, Louisiana.
- 53-6073 - Kindley Park in Gravette, Arkansas.
- 53-6091 - Tomorrows Aeronautical Museum in Compton, California.
- 53-6102 - VFW Post 8562, Maverick County Lake in Eagle Pass, Texas.
- 53-6123 - Langan Park in Mobile, Alabama.
- 53-6132 - Douglas, Georgia.
- 55-3025 - Minnesota Air National Guard Museum located on the north side of the Minneapolis–Saint Paul International Airport, Minneapolis, Minnesota.
- 56-1660 - Magic Valley Regional Airport, Twin Falls, Idaho.
- 56-1710 - Wings Over the Rockies Air and Space Museum, Denver, Colorado.
- 56-1747 - American Airpower Museum, Farmingdale, New York.
- 56-1779 - American Legion Post 71 in Duluth, Minnesota. Displayed as 52-9406.
- 57-0590 - South Dakota Air and Space Museum, Ellsworth AFB, South Dakota.
- 57-0688 - Aviation Cadet Museum, Eureka Springs, Arkansas.
- 57-6560 - Costilla County Veterans Park, Fort Garland, Colorado.
- 58-0504 - South Carolina Cotton Museum/Lee County Veterans Museum, Bishopville, South Carolina.
- 58-0509 - Jackson County Airport (Michigan).
- 58-0513 - March Field Air Museum in Riverside, California.
- 58-0542 - JROTC Gen C Powell Hall, Central High School, Highway 67 San Angelo, Texas.
- 58-0548 - Strategic Air & Space Museum, Ashland, Nebraska
- 58-0629 - Castle Air Museum at the former Castle Air Force Base in Atwater, California.
- 58-0651 - Southwest Technical Institute, East Camden, Arkansas.
- 58-0669 - Air Force Flight Test Museum beside the United States Air Force Test Pilot School, Edwards Air Force Base, California.
- 58-2106 - McChord Air Museum, McChord Air Force Base, Washington.
- 51-6653 - Baker City Municipal Airport, Baker City, Oregon.

T-33B

- 58-0480 - National Naval Aviation Museum, Pensacola Naval Air Station, Florida.
- T-33 on display at Sampson Air Force Museum, former Sampson Air Force Base, Romulus, NY.
- 580-1102 - On display at "Park Township Airport" in Holland, Michigan. The airport is now out of service, but the aircraft remains.
- 580-9594 - On display at the main entrance to Westchester County Airport in North Castle, New York.

=== Uruguay ===
On display

- Uruguayan Air Force Airbase #2 (St. Bernardina, Durazno).
- Airbase #1 (Carrasco Intl. Airport).
- ETA (Technical Air School).
- Cnel. (Av.) Jaime Meregalli.Museo Aeronáutico (Air Museum).
