= James Newsome House =

Historic house in North Carolina, United States

- U.S. National Register of Historic Places
- Location within North Carolina Location within the United States
- Location: 3 miles (4.8 km) east of Ahoskie on NC 350, near Ahoskie, North Carolina
- Coordinates: 36°16′44″N 76°03′22″W
- Area: 103 acres (42 ha)
- Built: 1820s or 1830s
- Built by: Hollomon, Drew
- Architectural style: Federal
- NRHP reference No.: 84000803
- Added to NRHP: December 28, 1984

James Newsome House, also known as Wynnewood, is a historic plantation house located near Ahoskie, Hertford County, North Carolina. It was built in the 1820s or 1830s, and is a two-story, three-bay Federal-style frame dwelling. It has a gable roof, beaded siding, and brick chimneys with free-standing stacks at the gable ends. Also on the property are the contributing slave cabin, smokehouse, large barn, and plantation office.

It was listed on the National Register of Historic Places in 1984.
