= Jason Horton =

American football player (born 1980)

No. 26
- Position: Cornerback

Personal information
- Born: February 16, 1980 (age 46); Ahoskie, North Carolina, U.S.
- Listed height: 6 ft 0 in (1.83 m)
- Listed weight: 190 lb (86 kg)

Career information
- High school: Hertford County (Ahoskie)
- College: North Carolina (1999–2000); North Carolina A&T (2001–2002)
- NFL draft: 2003: undrafted

Career history
- Toronto Argonauts (2003); Green Bay Packers (2004–2005); Houston Texans (2007); Kansas City Chiefs (2008)*; Oakland Raiders (2009)*; Calgary Stampeders (2010); Virginia Destroyers (2011)
- * Offseason or practice squad member only

Career NFL statistics
- Total tackles: 28
- Stats at Pro Football Reference

Jason Dennard Horton (born February 16, 1980) is an American former professional football player who was a cornerback in the National Football League (NFL) and Canadian Football League (CFL). He was signed by the Toronto Argonauts as an undrafted free agent in 2003. He played college football for the North Carolina A&T Aggies.

Horton was also a member of the Green Bay Packers, Houston Texans, Kansas City Chiefs, Calgary Stampeders and Virginia Destroyers.
