= Roberts H. Jernigan House =

Historic house in North Carolina, United States

- U.S. National Register of Historic Places
- U.S. Historic district – Contributing property
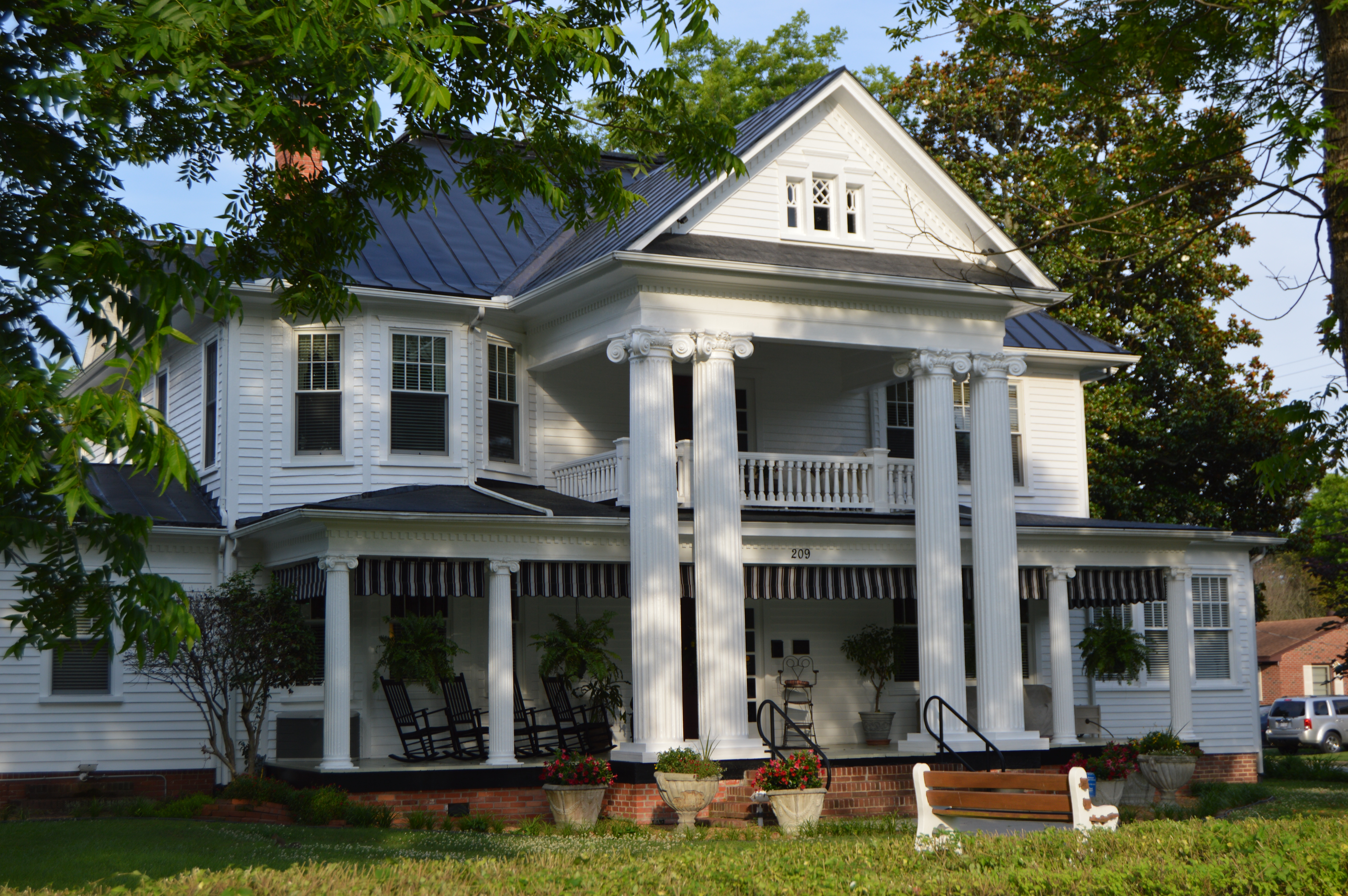
- Facade

- Location within North Carolina Location within the United States
- Location: 209 S. Catherine Creek Rd., Ahoskie, North Carolina
- Coordinates: 36°16′50″N 76°58′47″W
- Built: 1917-1918
- Architectural style: Colonial Revival, Southern Colonial
- NRHP reference No.: 01000123
- Added to NRHP: February 16, 2001

Roberts H. Jernigan House is a historic home located at Ahoskie, Hertford County, North Carolina. It was built in 1917–1918, and is a two-story, Southern Colonial style frame dwelling with a truncated hip roof. It is sheathed in weatherboard and features a two-story, pedimented portico flanked by one-story porches extending to sides.

It was listed on the National Register of Historic Places in 2001. It is located in the Ahoskie Historic District.

Roberts H. Jernigan was born in Kobe, Japan about 1890 while his father, Thomas R. Jernigan, was serving there as US consul (1885-1889) under the first administration of Grover Cleveland. Roberts' father had served in the 15th North Carolina Cavalry in the US Civil War, studied law, and become active in Hertford County, North Carolina politics. In Cleveland's second term, Roberts' father served as US consul general to Shanghai, China (1893-1897).

Roberts married before World War I and built the Jernigan House for his young family a few years later. His son, Roberts H. Jernigan, Jr., like Roberts' father, worked for a time in Beijing. In the early days of World War II, Roberts Jr was captured by the Japanese and imprisoned for nearly two years, then served as an ensign in the US Navy through the end of the war. Roberts Jr subsequently served as a member of the North Carolina House of Representatives for 18 years.
