= Mulberry Grove (Ahoskie, North Carolina) =

Historic house in North Carolina, United States

- U.S. National Register of Historic Places
- Location within North Carolina Location within the United States
- Location: Southwest of Ahoskie, near Ahoskie, North Carolina
- Coordinates: 36°17′32″N 77°9′1″W
- Area: 2.4 acres (0.97 ha)
- Built: c. 1758
- Architectural style: Greek Revival, Georgian
- NRHP reference No.: 80002848
- Added to NRHP: November 25, 1980

Mulberry Grove was a historic plantation house located near Ahoskie, Hertford County, North Carolina. It was built about 1758, and was originally a 1 1/2-story brick dwelling with Georgian detailing, which was raised to two stories. At that time, it was extensively remodeled in the Greek Revival style with a hipped roof. It has a frame wing to form a "T"-shape. It was the ancestral seat of the Cotton and Moore families of Hertford County. The house has been demolished.

It was listed on the National Register of Historic Places in 1980.
