= King-Casper-Ward-Bazemore House =

Historic house in North Carolina, United States

- U.S. National Register of Historic Places
- Location within North Carolina Location within the United States
- Location: West of Ahoskie on NC 11, near Ahoskie, North Carolina
- Coordinates: 36°16′37″N 77°3′2″W
- Area: 3 acres (1.2 ha)
- Built: c. 1805
- Built by: Bunch Family
- Architectural style: Federal
- NRHP reference No.: 82001299
- Added to NRHP: November 26, 1982

King-Casper-Ward-Bazemore House, also known as the Cling Bazemore House, is a historic home located near Ahoskie, Hertford County, North Carolina. It was built about 1805, and is a two-story, three-bay, Federal period frame dwelling with a truncated hip roof. It is sheathed in beaded siding and has two brick chimneys. The house was moved to its present site in 1980.

It was listed on the National Register of Historic Places in 1982.
