= Ahoskie Historic District =

Historic district in North Carolina, United States

- U.S. National Register of Historic Places
- U.S. Historic district
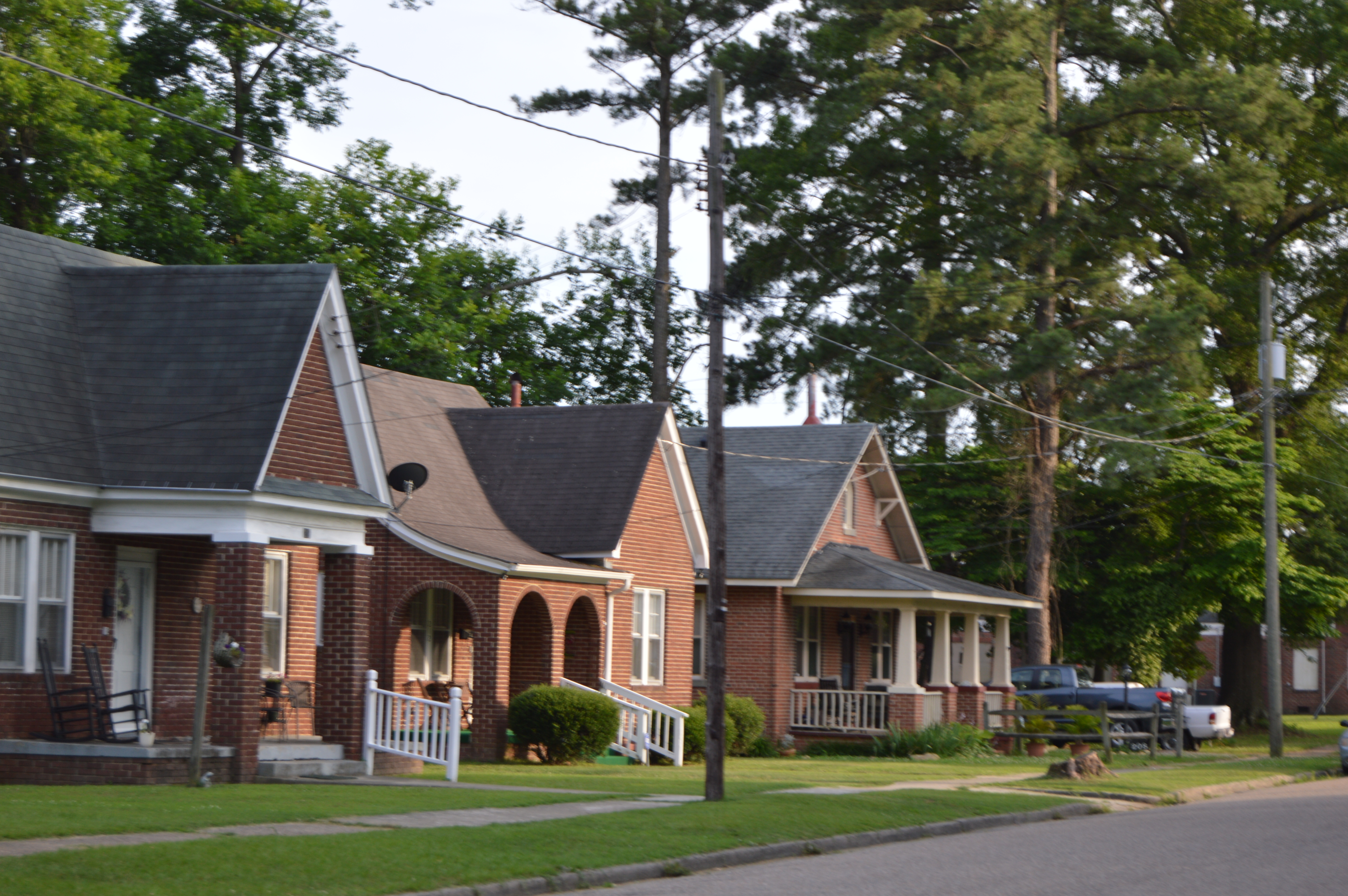
- Houses on McGlohon Street

- Location within North Carolina Location within the United States
- Location: Roughly bounded by Pembroke Ave., Catherine Creek Rd., Colony, Alton, Maple, & South Sts., Ahoskie, North Carolina
- Coordinates: 36°17′14″N 76°59′05″W
- Area: 205 acres (83 ha)
- Architect: Multiple
- Architectural style: Classical Revival, Colonial Revival, Tudor Revival, Late Gothic Revival, Bungalow/Craftsman
- NRHP reference No.: 12000237
- Added to NRHP: April 24, 2012

Ahoskie Historic District is a national historic district located at Ahoskie, Hertford County, North Carolina. The district encompasses 604 contributing buildings, 1 contributing site, and 2 contributing structures in the central business district and surrounding residential sections of Ahoskie. The buildings include notable examples of Classical Revival, Colonial Revival, Late Gothic Revival, Tudor Revival, and Bungalow / American Craftsman architecture. The district includes the separately listed Ahoskie School and Roberts H. Jernigan House and encompasses the previously listed Ahoskie Downtown Historic District. Other notable buildings include The Tomahawk Motel (c. 1959-1960), Ahoskie Food Center (c. 1953), Thomas Wright Hayes House (c. 1805, c. 1850, c. 1948), Basnight & Company Building (c. 1931), Ahoskie United Methodist Church (c. 1927), St. Thomas Episcopal Church (1931, c. 1955, c. 1993), and North Carolina Mutual Insurance Company (c. 1920).

It was listed on the National Register of Historic Places in 2012.
