= Ahoskie Downtown Historic District =

Historic district in North Carolina, United States

- U.S. National Register of Historic Places
- U.S. Historic district
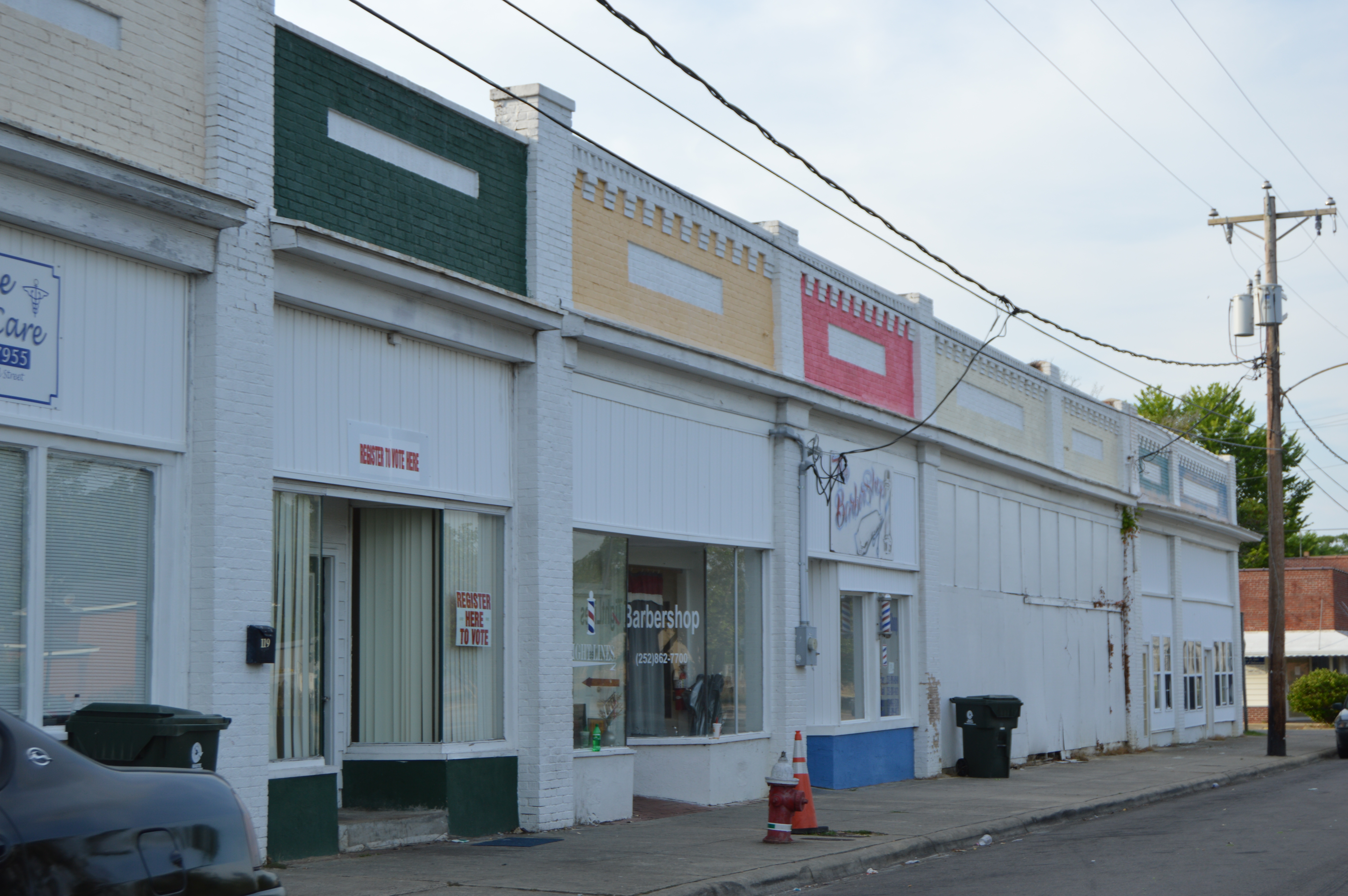
- Buildings on Railroad Street

- Location within North Carolina Location within the United States
- Location: Roughly bounded by W. North St., Seaboard Coastline RR, W. Main St., S. and N. Mitchell Sts., Ahoskie, North Carolina
- Coordinates: 36°17′10″N 76°59′13″W
- Area: 7 acres (2.8 ha)
- Architectural style: Classical Revival, Colonial Revival
- NRHP reference No.: 85000906
- Added to NRHP: April 25, 1985

Ahoskie Downtown Historic District is a national historic district located at Ahoskie, Hertford County, North Carolina. The district encompasses 14 contributing buildings in the central business district of Ahoskie. The commercial and governmental buildings include notable examples of Classical Revival and Colonial Revival architecture dated between 1901 and the late 1930s. Notable buildings include the (former) United States Post Office (1940), Garrett Hotel (1926), W. D. Newsome Building (c. 1905), Hotel Comfort (1907), Mitchell Hotel (c. 1910), Hertford Herald building (c. 1915), Bank of Ahoskie (1925-1926), Sawyer~Browne Furniture Company (1924), Richard Theater (1927), and E. L. Garrett Building (1938).

The historic district was listed on the National Register of Historic Places in 1985. It was incorporated into the Ahoskie Historic District in 2012.
