= William Mitchell House =

Historic house in North Carolina, United States

- U.S. National Register of Historic Places
- Location within North Carolina Location within the United States
- Location: 3 miles (4.8 km) east of Ahoskie on NC 350, near Ahoskie, North Carolina
- Coordinates: 36°16′57″N 77°02′56″W
- Area: 20 acres (8.1 ha)
- Built: c. 1832
- Built by: William W. Mitchell
- Architectural style: Greek Revival, Federal
- NRHP reference No.: 72000965
- Added to NRHP: December 4, 1972

William Mitchell House is a historic home located near Ahoskie, Hertford County, North Carolina. It was built about 1832, and is a two-story, five-bay-by-two-bay, L-shaped Federal style frame dwelling, with Greek Revival style design elements. It has a shallow gable roof and brick pier foundation. Also on the property are the contributing office, schoolhouse, carriage house, and smokehouse. It was the home of William Mitchell, one of the founders of Chowan University.

It was listed on the National Register of Historic Places in 1972.
