= East End Historic District (Ahoskie, North Carolina) =

Historic district in North Carolina, United States

- U.S. National Register of Historic Places
- U.S. Historic district
- Location within North Carolina Location within the United States
- Location: Bounded by Maple St., Town boundary, Catherine Creek Rd. & Holloman Ave., Ahoskie, North Carolina
- Coordinates: 36°17′37″N 76°58′26″W
- Area: 41 acres (17 ha)
- Built by: Newsome, H.J.
- Architectural style: Colonial Revival, gable-front
- NRHP reference No.: 07001497
- Added to NRHP: January 31, 2008

East End Historic District is a national historic district located at Ahoskie, Hertford County, North Carolina. The district encompasses 27 contributing buildings and 1 contributing structure in a predominantly African-American residential section of Ahoskie. The buildings include notable examples of Colonial Revival architecture. Notable buildings include the 12 buildings and racetrack at the Atlantic District Fairgrounds and 3 brick buildings at the Robert L. Vann Elementary and High School complex.

It was listed on the National Register of Historic Places in 2008.
