= Bihoro Aviation Park =

Coordinates: 43.8157724°N 144.0786635°E

美幌航空公園 (Bihoro Aviation Park, bihirokokukoen) is an outdoor aviation museum located in Bihoro in Hokkaido Prefecture in Japan.

== Aircraft displayed ==
- JG-0505 Beechcraft T-34 Mentor (Japan Ground Self-Defense Force)
- 52-0076 North American T-6 Texan (Japan Air Self-Defense Force)
- 81-5386 Lockheed T-33A Shooting Star (Japan Air Self-Defense Force)
- 41583 HU-1B Iroquois (Japan Ground Self-Defense Force)
- JG-0001 Piasecki H-21 (Japan Ground Self-Defense Force)

== Gallery ==
Aircraft on display

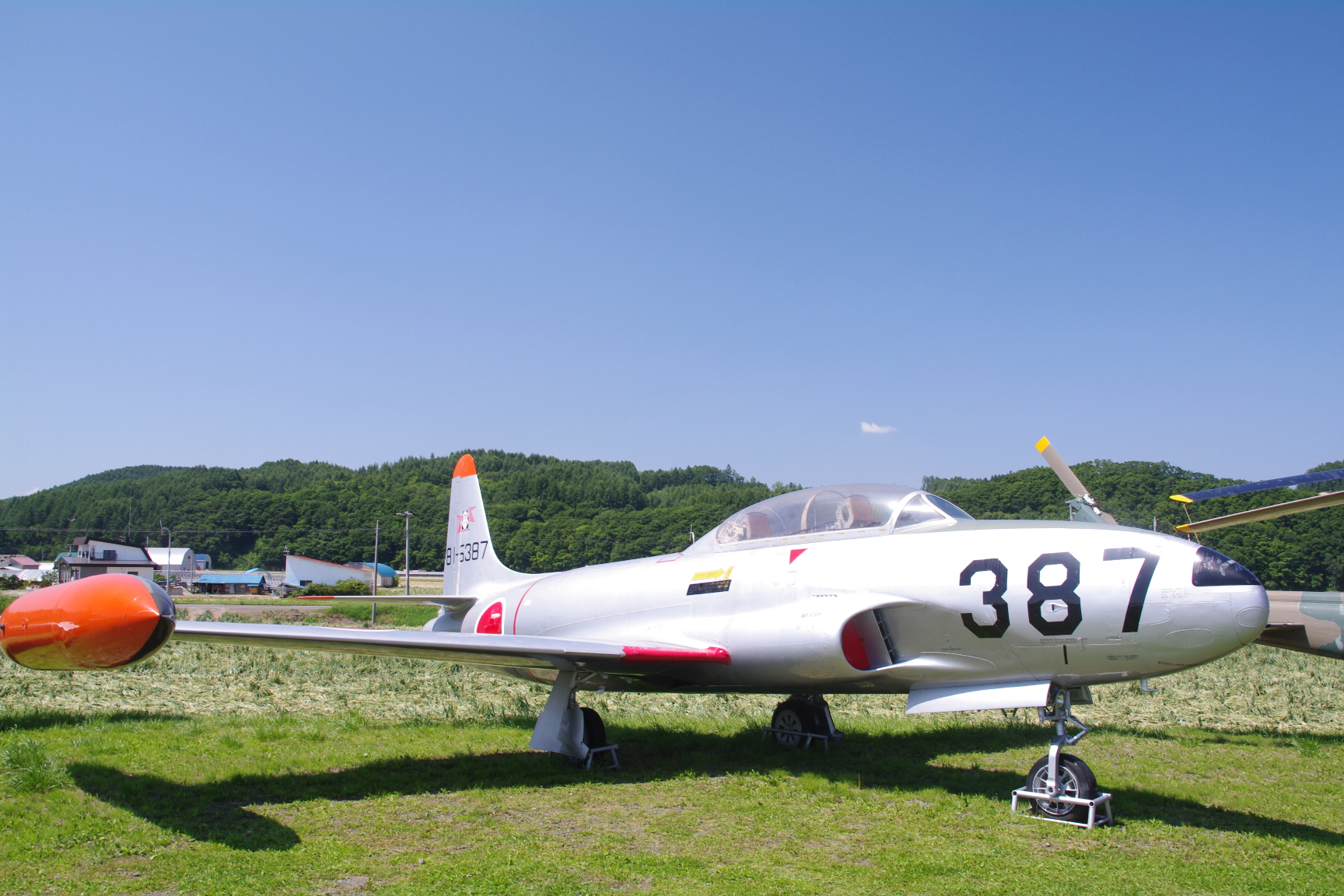
Lockheed T-33A Shooting Star

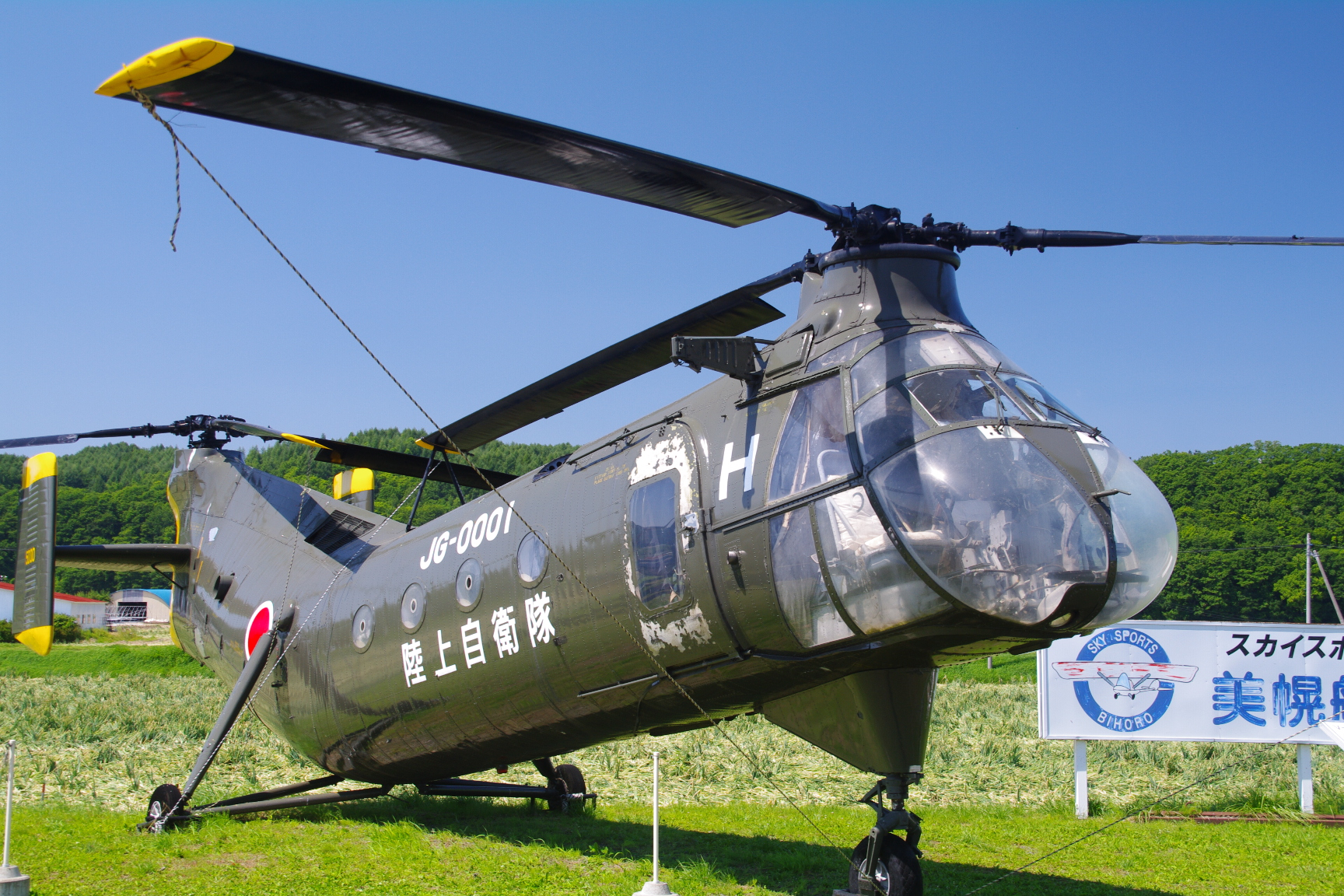
Piasecki H-21

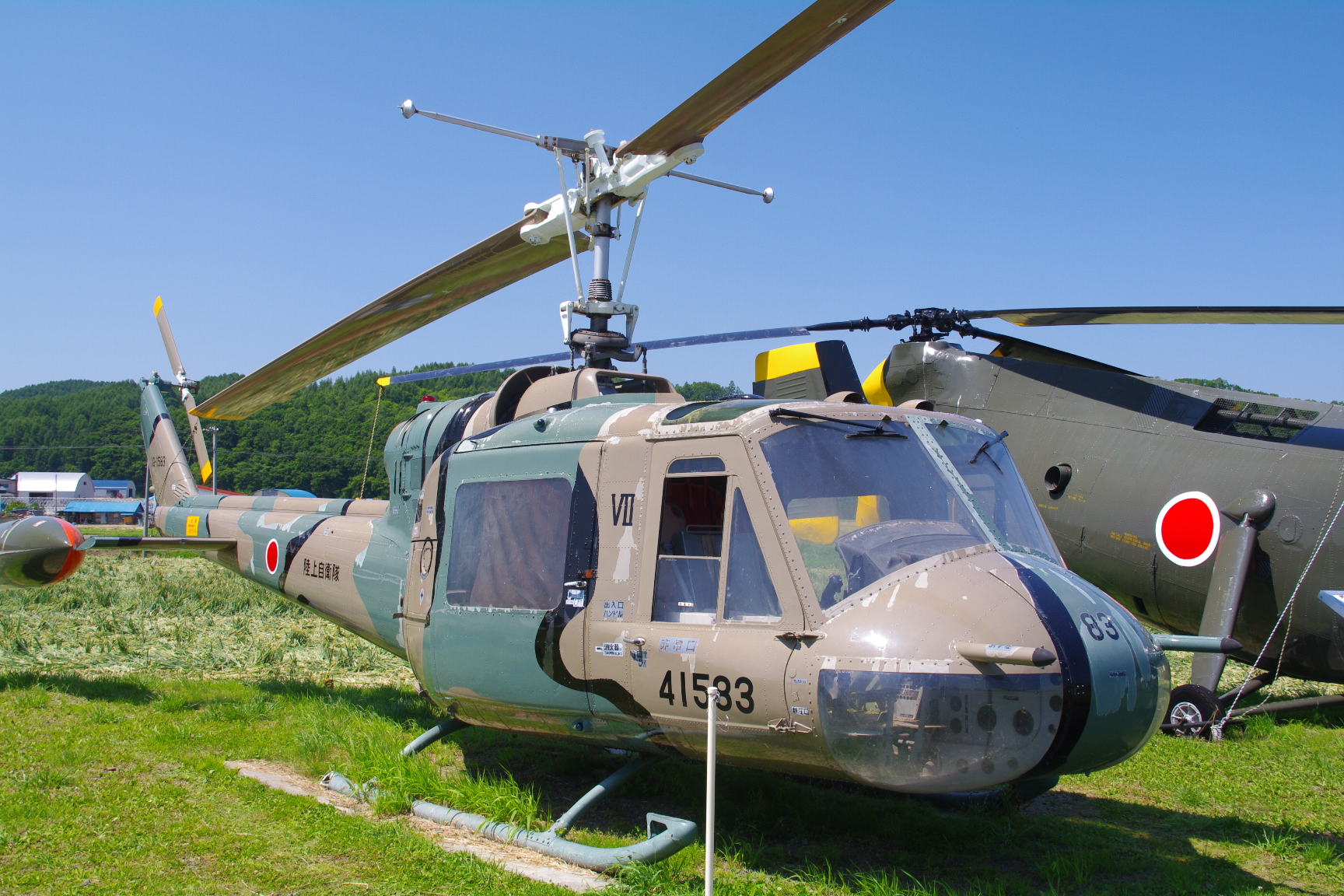
HU-1B Iroquois

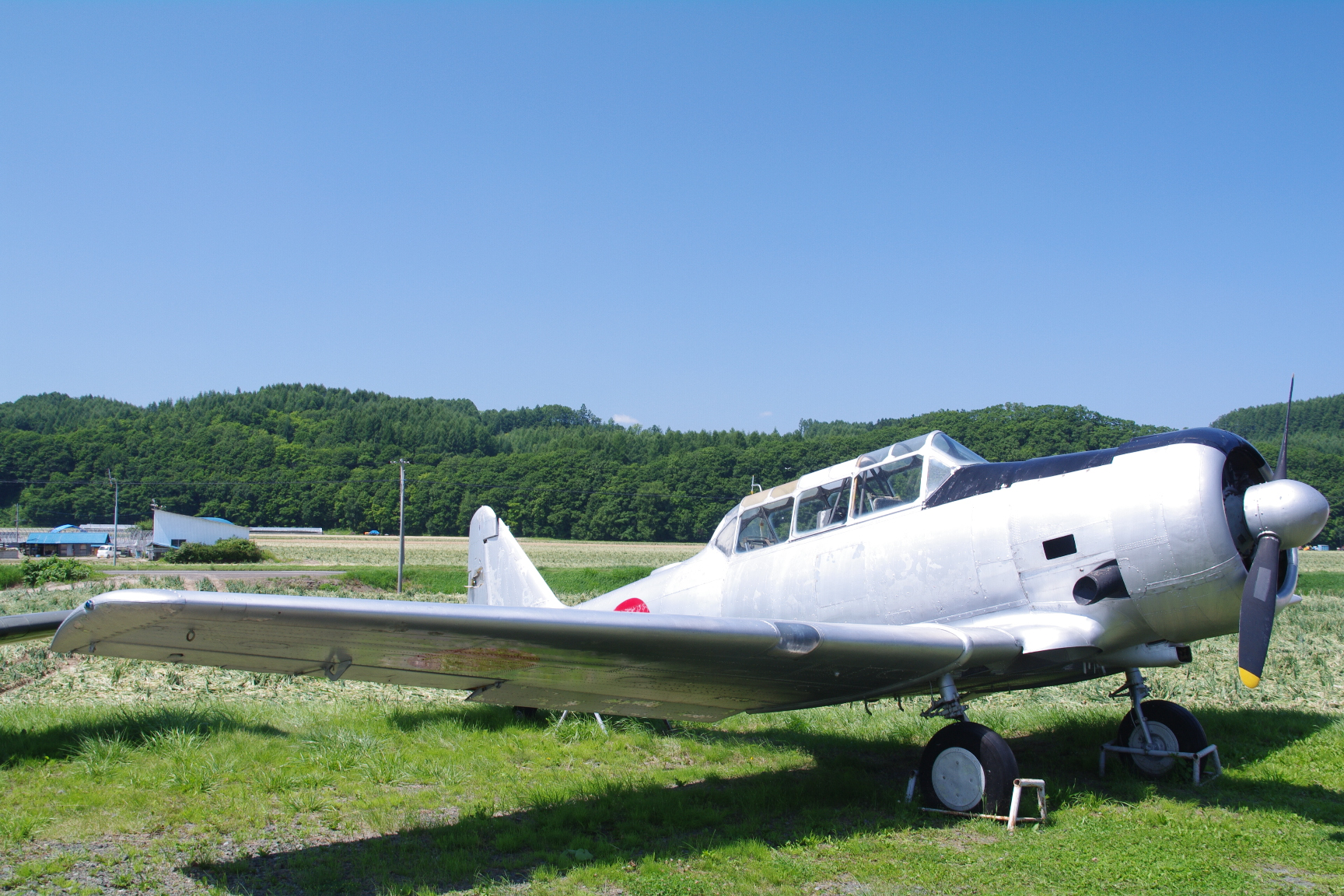
North American T-6 Texan

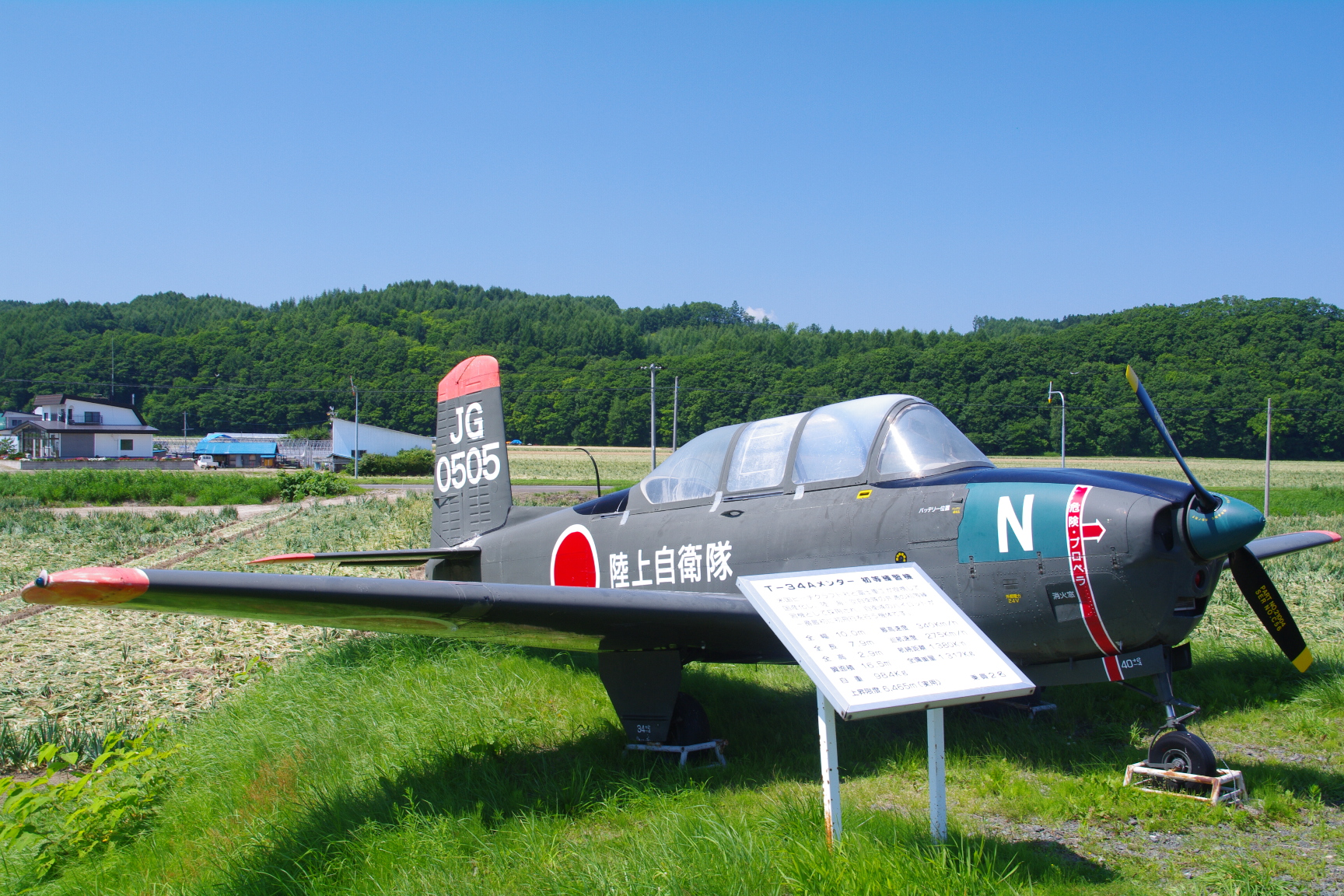
Beechcraft T-34A Mentor

== See also ==
- List of aviation museums
