= Army Museum Lahore =

Pakistani military museum

- پاک فوج عجائب گھر لاہور
- Established: 17 August 2017
- Location: Lahore Cantonment, Lahore, Punjab, Pakistan
- Coordinates: 31.5320°N 74.3981°E
- Website: armymuseumlahore.pk

Army Museum Lahore (Urdu: پاک فوج عجائب گھر لاہور) is a museum located in Lahore documenting the military history of Pakistan.

Established in 2017, it is based on Lahore Cantonment land opposite Allama Iqbal International Airport. The museum is Pakistan's second largest collection of military objects in the country. The collection highlights the Military history of Pakistan, from the 16th century Mughal Empire to the modern day Pakistan.

== Establishment ==
The Museum was officially inaugurated on 13 August 2017 and opened to the public on 23 September 2017 and is one of Pakistan’s largest heritage institutions, showcasing a comprehensive history of the Pakistan Army from the Mughal Era to the Insurgency in Khyber Pakhtunkhwa.

Its galleries include Shuhada Wall, History of Pakistan, Rebirth of a Nation, Evolution of Warfare, Tribute to the White of Flag, Women in Khaki, Tribute to the Nation, Nation Building, and more. The museum also features a War Memorial dedicated to the martyrs of IV Corps. Since its opening, Army Museum Lahore has become one of the most visited cultural and educational landmarks in Pakistan.

The museum is presently led by Director Umer Khalid Chattha and Deputy Director Dr. Muhammad Shafiq .

- Director Umer Khalid Chattha provides strategic direction for the growth, modernization, and public outreach of the museum, ensuring it remains a national hub of military history and cultural heritage.
- Deputy Director Dr. Muhammad Shafiq Ahmed, a PhD in Educational Psychology, oversees museum curation, research, and educational programs. He is actively involved in exhibition design, heritage preservation, and public engagement initiatives, bridging the gap between historical scholarship and public learning. His vision emphasizes making the museum an institution of both knowledge and inspiration, accessible to students, researchers, and the general public alike.

== Army Museum-War Elephant Display ==
In the initial design of Army Museum Lahore, History of Pakistan, Rebirth of a Nation, and Evolution of Warfare galleries were not planned. The idea emerged when the museum's history theme was changed from 1947 to ancient history of the land (9000 years old urbanized history). One of the major reasons was a discussion on a book, Historic Battlefield of Pakistan by Johnny Torrens-Spence. During the first phase, 1948 and 1965 war galleries were readjusted and History of Pakistan and Rebirth of a Nation galleries were designed. In next phase, Army Accolades, Nation Building, and Tribute to the Nation galleries were converted into wall displays. Resultantly, space was created in the central aisle. The central aisle was titled as Evolution of Warfare. It was decided to display the following side by side:

▪ A war elephant, a horse, and a tank.

▪ A chariot and an APC (Armoured Personnel Carrier).

▪ An archeror and an artillery gun.

▪ An ancient infantry soldier and a modern infantry soldier.
