= Ahoskie, North Carolina =

- Town
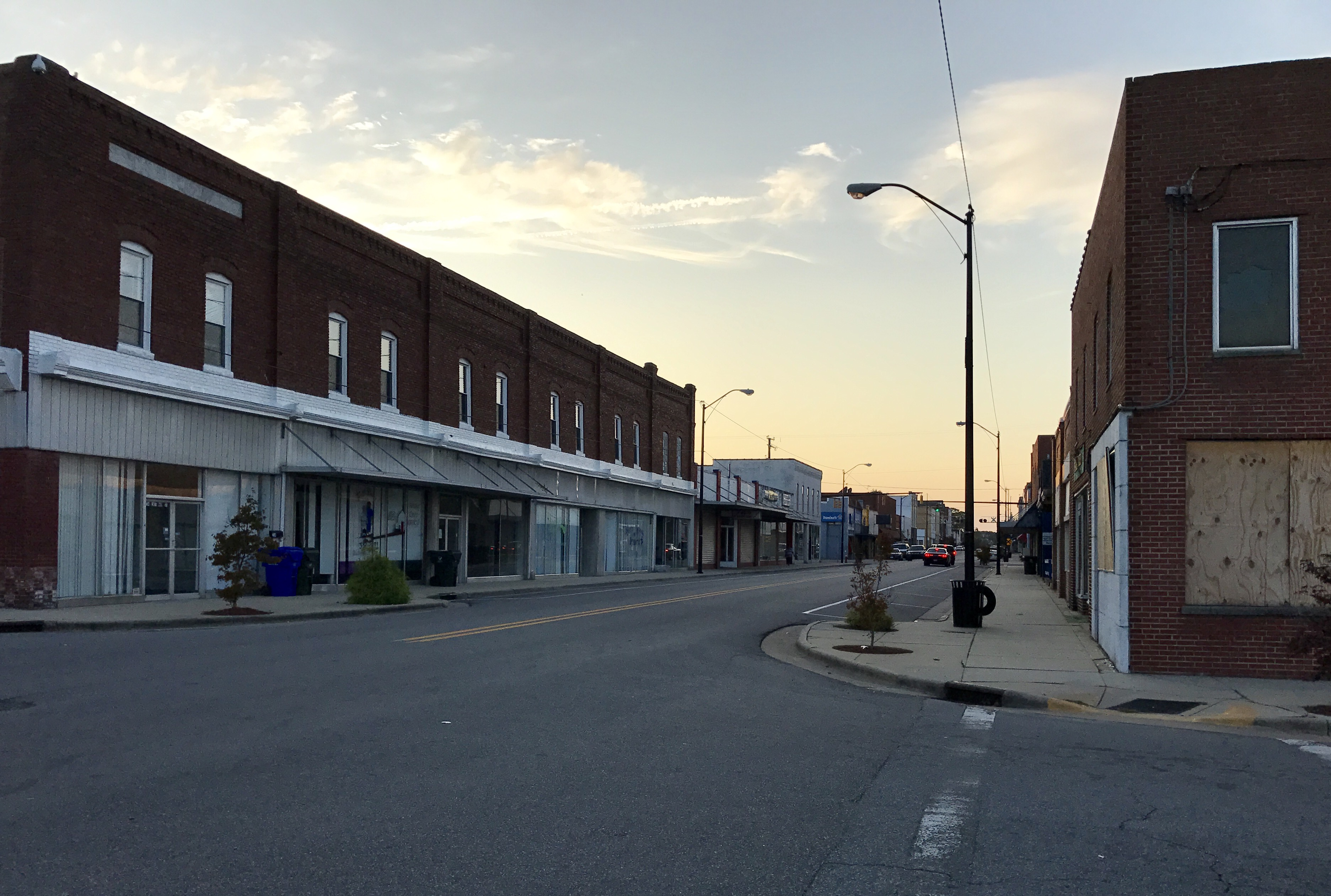
- View down Main Street in Ahoskie, facing west

- Seal
- Motto: "The Only One"
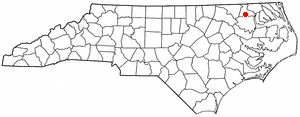
- Location of Ahoskie, North Carolina
- Coordinates: 36°17′03″N 76°59′24″W
- Country: United States
- State: North Carolina
- County: Hertford

Government
  - Mayor: Weyling White

Area
  - Total: 4.40 sq mi (11.40 km^{2})
  - Land: 4.40 sq mi (11.40 km^{2})
  - Water: 0 sq mi (0.00 km^{2})
- Elevation: 52 ft (16 m)

Population (2020)
  - Total: 4,891
  - Density: 1,111.3/sq mi (429.09/km^{2})
- Time zone: UTC-5 (Eastern (EST))
  - Summer (DST): UTC-4 (EDT)
- ZIP code: 27910
- Area code: 252
- FIPS code: 37-00500
- GNIS feature ID: 2405124
- Website: www.ahoskienc.gov

Ahoskie (ah-HOSS-kee /ɑːˈhɒski/) is a town in Hertford County, North Carolina, United States. The population was 4,891 at the 2020 census. Ahoskie is located in North Carolina's Inner Banks region. Its nickname is "The Only One" because no other town in the world is known by the same name. The etymology of the word Ahoskie, which was originally spelled "Ahotsky", was from the Wyanoke Indians, who entered the Hertford County area at the beginning of European settlement.

== History ==
Ahoskie began as a railroad siding for log trains hauling timber from the forests of Bertie and Hertford counties to a sawmill at Tunis on the Chowan and Southern Railroad line beginning in 1885. The town grew out of a loading station and commissaries to supply the community workers who cut, hauled and loaded the logs. Ahoskie's post office was established in 1889. The first passenger train passed through town on the newly opened tracks of the Norfolk and Carolina line in 1890.

By the time of its incorporation on January 24, 1893, Ahoskie had grown to include several stores, a saw mill and gin, a one-room school and a Baptist church. Other industries that flourished in the town's early days included an ice plant, a laundry operated by a wandering Chinese man, and a number of horse and mule exchanges and sales stables. Since few of the smaller towns in Hertford and Bertie counties were located on passenger lines, traveling salesman or "drummers" would use the town as a base to make sales trips to outlying community stores by horse and buggy.

The town's first bank, the Bank of Ahoskie, was chartered in 1905.

This area's economy was initially based on the cultivation of tobacco and cotton. It has continued to be largely rural with small towns.

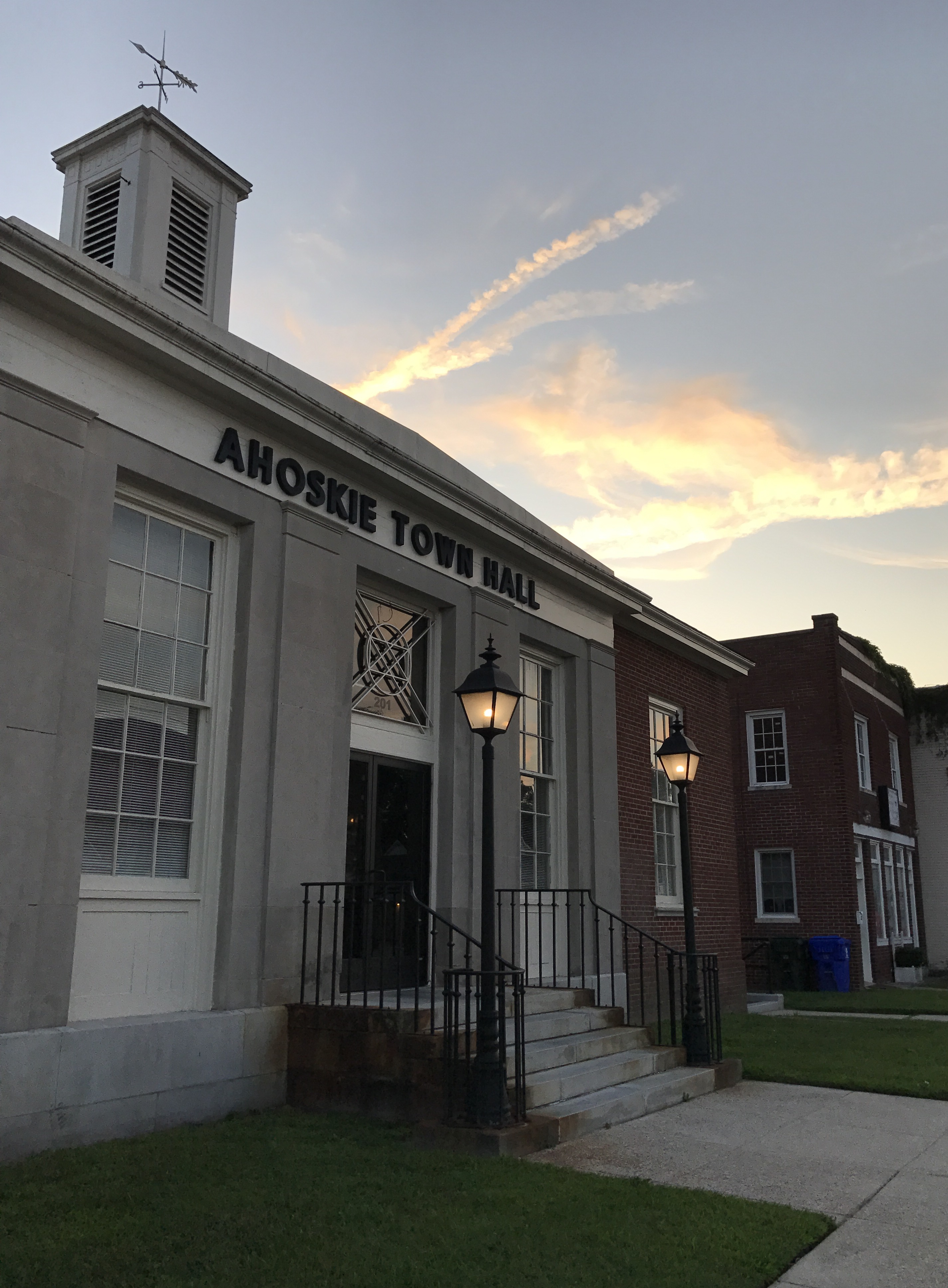
Town hall

The town has both historic districts and individual buildings listed on the National Register of Historic Places: the Ahoskie Historic District, Ahoskie Downtown Historic District, and East End Historic District; and Ahoskie School, Roberts H. Jernigan House, King-Casper-Ward-Bazemore House, William Mitchell House, Mulberry Grove, and James Newsome House. The town has highlighted these resources to encourage heritage tourism.

The county gave an acre of land on which the first Black school in Ahoskie was built, three years after the Civil War. The one-room schoolhouse at Hayes Street and Catherine Creek Road remained about 35 years. The first teacher at the school was Van Butler, and the school term was four months.

Through years of untiring efforts by the Black community, by 1939 the Ahoskie Graded School consisted of two brick buildings, with fourteen elementary teachers, five high school teachers and an enrollment of some 800 boys and girls.

The first Black church, the New Ahoskie Baptist Church, was organized in 1866. Other early churches in the Black community were the Methodist Church and Calvary Baptist Church.

The first charity organized in the Black community was Love and Charity, a mutual help group that met in members' homes under the slogan "Love to All, True to each Other, Mercy to all Mankind." Other early organizations included the Elks, Masons and Tents. The United Order of the Queens of the Orient had its origins in Ahoskie in 1923.

By 1939, the town had grown to include a number of Black-owned businesses including five grocery stores, three barber shops, three cafes, a dry goods store, a millinery shop, three hairdressers, three seamstresses, a doctor, a stenographer, two funeral homes and a garage. The Atlantic District Fair Association represented the economic interests of the town's Black community.

Perhaps the largest show seen in the town was a visit by Buffalo Bill's Wild West Show in October 1916, an event that drew an estimated 12,000 people and required three shows to accommodate everybody. The leading citizens of the town hosted a breakfast at the Manhattan hotel for Col. William F. Cody, who expressed his deep appreciation for the hospitality accorded to him. Cody's visit came about through the personal solicitation of a kinsman of the show's business manager.

Electric lights were first turned on in Ahoskie around Christmas in 1915. The power was generated by a gasoline engine and within two years was providing electricity day and night.

Ahoskie was the first stop in North Carolina for first lady Claudia Alta Johnson during her whistle-stop tour of the South aboard the Lady Bird Express, on October 6, 1964.

== Geography ==
According to the United States Census Bureau, the town has a total area of 4.35 square miles, all land.

== Demographics ==
Historical population
Census	Pop.	Note	%±
1900	302		—
1910	924		206.0%
1920	1,429		54.7%
1930	1,940		35.8%
1940	2,313		19.2%
1950	3,579		54.7%
1960	4,583		28.1%
1970	5,105		11.4%
1980	4,887		−4.3%
1990	4,391		−10.1%
2000	4,523		3.0%
2010	5,039		11.4%
2020	4,891		−2.9%
2022 (est.)	4,657	▼	−4.8%
U.S. Decennial Census

=== Racial and ethnic composition ===
Ahoskie town, North Carolina – Racial and ethnic composition Note: the US Census treats Hispanic/Latino as an ethnic category. This table excludes Latinos from the racial categories and assigns them to a separate category. Hispanics/Latinos may be of any race.
Race / Ethnicity (NH = Non-Hispanic)	Pop 2000	Pop 2010	Pop 2020	% 2000	% 2010	% 2020
White alone (NH)	1,671	1,414	1,158	36.94%	28.06%	23.68%
Black or African American alone (NH)	2,636	3,347	3,334	58.28%	66.42%	68.17%
Native American or Alaska Native alone (NH)	75	75	57	1.66%	1.49%	1.17%
Asian alone (NH)	28	63	68	0.62%	1.25%	1.39%
Native Hawaiian or Pacific Islander alone (NH)	0	0	1	0.00%	0.00%	0.02%
Other race alone (NH)	1	8	18	0.02%	0.16%	0.37%
Mixed race or Multiracial (NH)	31	49	147	0.69%	0.97%	3.01%
Hispanic or Latino (any race)	81	83	108	1.79%	1.65%	2.21%
Total	4,523	5,039	4,891	100.00%	100.00%	100.00%

=== 2020 census ===
As of the 2020 census, there were 4,891 people, 2,015 households, and 1,044 families residing in the town.

The median age was 43.3 years. 24.1% of residents were under the age of 18 and 24.3% were 65 years of age or older. For every 100 females there were 73.9 males, and for every 100 females age 18 and over there were 67.5 males age 18 and over.

99.4% of residents lived in urban areas, while 0.6% lived in rural areas.

Of all households, 30.1% had children under the age of 18 living in them. 25.8% were married-couple households, 20.0% were households with a male householder and no spouse or partner present, and 49.0% were households with a female householder and no spouse or partner present. About 39.7% of households were made up of individuals, and 18.4% had someone living alone who was 65 years of age or older.

There were 2,326 housing units, of which 13.4% were vacant. The homeowner vacancy rate was 3.4% and the rental vacancy rate was 9.1%.

=== 2010 census ===
As of the census of 2010, there were 5,039 people, 2,062 households, and 1,263 families residing in the town. The population density was 1,169 inhabitants per square mile. There were 2,309 housing units at an average density of 536 per square mile. The racial makeup of the town was 66.6% African American, 28.5% White, 1.50% Native American, 1.3% Asian, and 1.1% from two or more races. Hispanic or Latino of any race were 1.6% of the population.

There were 2,062 households, out of which 20.9% had children under the age of 18, 43.0% were married couples living together, 25.2% had a female householder with no husband present, and 31.8% were non-families. The average household size was 2.35 and the average family size was 3.01.

The population ages were distributed with 28.1% under the age of 20, 5.7% from 20 to 24, 22.3% from 25 to 44, 24.3% from 45 to 64, and 19.7% who were 65 years of age or older. The median age was 39.5 years.

The median income for a household in the town was $28,438, and the median income for a family was $37,833. Males had a median income of $36,711 versus $27,398 for females. The per capita income for the town was $17,648. About 19.8% of families and 26.4% of the population were below the poverty line, including 36.8% of those under age 18 and 22.4% of those age 65 or over.

== Business and college ==
Ahoskie is home to the Roanoke-Chowan News-Herald newspaper. In nearby Cofield there is a steel rolling mill owned and operated by Nucor Steel. Roanoke-Chowan Community College is located just outside Ahoskie in Union.

In the late 1990s, the town of Ahoskie donated a former elementary school to Shaw University, based in Raleigh. It established a Continuing and Professional Education (C.A.P.E.) center, to help improve and enhance the vocational and educational skills of individuals in lower-class communities in the surrounding area.

== Notable people ==
- Kentwan Balmer – defensive end in the NFL
- Edward L. Fike – journalist and publisher in California, Montana, North Carolina, Ohio, and Virginia
- Bobby Futrell – cornerback in the NFL for the Tampa Bay Buccaneers from 1986 to 1990
- Sam Harrell – running back in the NFL for the Minnesota Vikings
- Robert Lee Holloman – Democratic member of the North Carolina General Assembly
- Jason Horton – former NFL, CFL and Arena Football League cornerback
- Howard J. Hunter Jr. – Democratic member of the North Carolina General Assembly
- Toran James – former NFL, XFL and Arena Football League fullback/linebacker
- Ella Mitchell – soul singer and actress
- Dick Newsome – pitcher for the Boston Red Sox
- Timmy Newsome – fullback in the NFL for the Dallas Cowboys from 1980 to 1988
- Amber O'Neal – professional wrestler
- Graham Smith – Tuskegee Airman
- Robert Lee Vann – newspaper publisher and editor
- Tom Umphlett – MLB player for the Boston Red Sox and Washington Senators
- Oshane Ximines – outside linebacker in the NFL for the New York Giants
