= Gray House =

Gray House may refer to:

== Arts ==
- The Gray House, a novel by Armenian Russian writer Mariam Petrosyan
- The Gray House (TV series), an American historical drama television miniseries released in February 2026

== Places in the United States ==
=== Alabama ===
- Rev. John H. Gray House, Eutaw

=== Arkansas ===
- Gray House (Crosby, Arkansas)
- Gray-Kincaid House, Crosby
- Walter Gray House, Melrose
- Louis Gray Homestead, Barn, Plainview
- Rufus Gray House, Pangburn

=== Colorado ===
- Garret and Julia Gray Cottage, Salida, listed on the National Register of Historic Places in Chaffee County, Colorado

=== Georgia ===
- Blackford-Gray House, Graysville, listed on the NRHP in Catoosa County, Georgia

=== Idaho ===
- John P. and Stella Gray House, Coeur d'Alene

=== Illinois ===
- William W. Gray House, Grayville

=== Kentucky ===
- Gray House (Shelbyville, Kentucky), listed on the NRHP in Shelby County, Kentucky

=== Maryland ===
- Gray Gables (Darlington, Maryland)

=== Maine ===
- Old Gray House, Boothbay

=== Massachusetts ===
- David Gray House, Andover
- Capt. Thomas Gray House, Barnstable
- Asa Gray House Cambridge

=== Missouri ===
- William Gray House, La Grange

=== Nevada ===
- Joseph H. Gray House, Reno

=== New Jersey ===
- De Gray House, Franklin Lakes

=== New York ===
- Gray-Jewett House, Amsterdam
- E. L. Gray House, Saranac Lake, in town of Harrietstown

=== North Carolina ===
- Gray-Brownlow-Wilcox House, Brinkleyville
- Bowman Gray House, known also as Rock House (Roaring Gap, North Carolina)
- Gray Gables (Winton, North Carolina)

=== Ohio ===
- Gray-Coulton House, Mentor, listed on the NRHP in Lake County, Ohio
- Adams-Gray House, Trinway

=== Oregon ===
- Capt. J. H. D. Gray House, Astoria, listed on the NRHP in Clatsop County, Oregon
- Sprague-Marshall-Bowie House, Portland, also known as the G.T. Gray House

=== Pennsylvania ===
- Gray-Taylor House, Brookville
- Whitefield House and Gray Cottage, Nazareth
- John Gray House (Port Matilda, Pennsylvania)

=== Tennessee ===
- Benajah Gray Log House, Antioch
- Henry P. Gray House, Franklin
- Isaac Gray House, Winchester, listed on the NRHP in Franklin County, Tennessee

=== Texas ===
- Gray Rental Houses, Belton, listed on the NRHP in Bell County, Texas

=== Utah ===
- Levins D. Gray House, Park City

=== Virginia ===
- Harry W. Gray House, Arlington
- White House of the Confederacy, Richmond, also known as the Gray House

=== Washington ===
- Dr. Paschal and Agnes Gray House, Ellensburg, listed on the NRHP in Kittitas County, Washington

== See also ==
- Grey House (disambiguation)
