= Sprague House =

Sprague House may refer to:

in the United States (by state then city)

- Lillard-Sprague House, Rogers, Arkansas, listed on the National Register of Historic Places (NRHP) in Benton County
- Elias Sprague House, Coventry, Connecticut, listed on the NRHP in Tolland County
- Sprague Street Houses, Shreveport, Louisiana, listed on the NRHP in Caddo Parish
- Sprague House (Danvers, Massachusetts), listed on the NRHP in Essex County
- Thomas S. Sprague House, Detroit, Michigan, listed on the NRHP in Detroit
- Rollin Sprague Building-Old Stone Store, Rochester, Michigan, listed on the NRHP in Oakland County
- David R. and Ellsworth A. Sprague Houses, Caledonia, Minnesota, listed on the NRHP in Houston County
- Sprague House, Ithaca, New York
- Sprague-Deaver House, Fredericktown, Ohio, listed on the NRHP in Knox County
- Jonathan Sprague House, Lowell, Ohio, listed on the NRHP in Washington County
- Sprague House (Wellington, Ohio), listed on the National Register of Historic Places in Lorain County
- Sprague-Marshall-Bowie House, Portland, Oregon, listed on the NRHP in Northwest Portland
- Gov. William Sprague Mansion, Cranston, Rhode Island, listed on the NRHP in Providence County
- David Sprague House, Providence, Rhode Island, listed on the NRHP in Providence County
