= Robert Lee Vann =

African-American newspaper publisher and editor

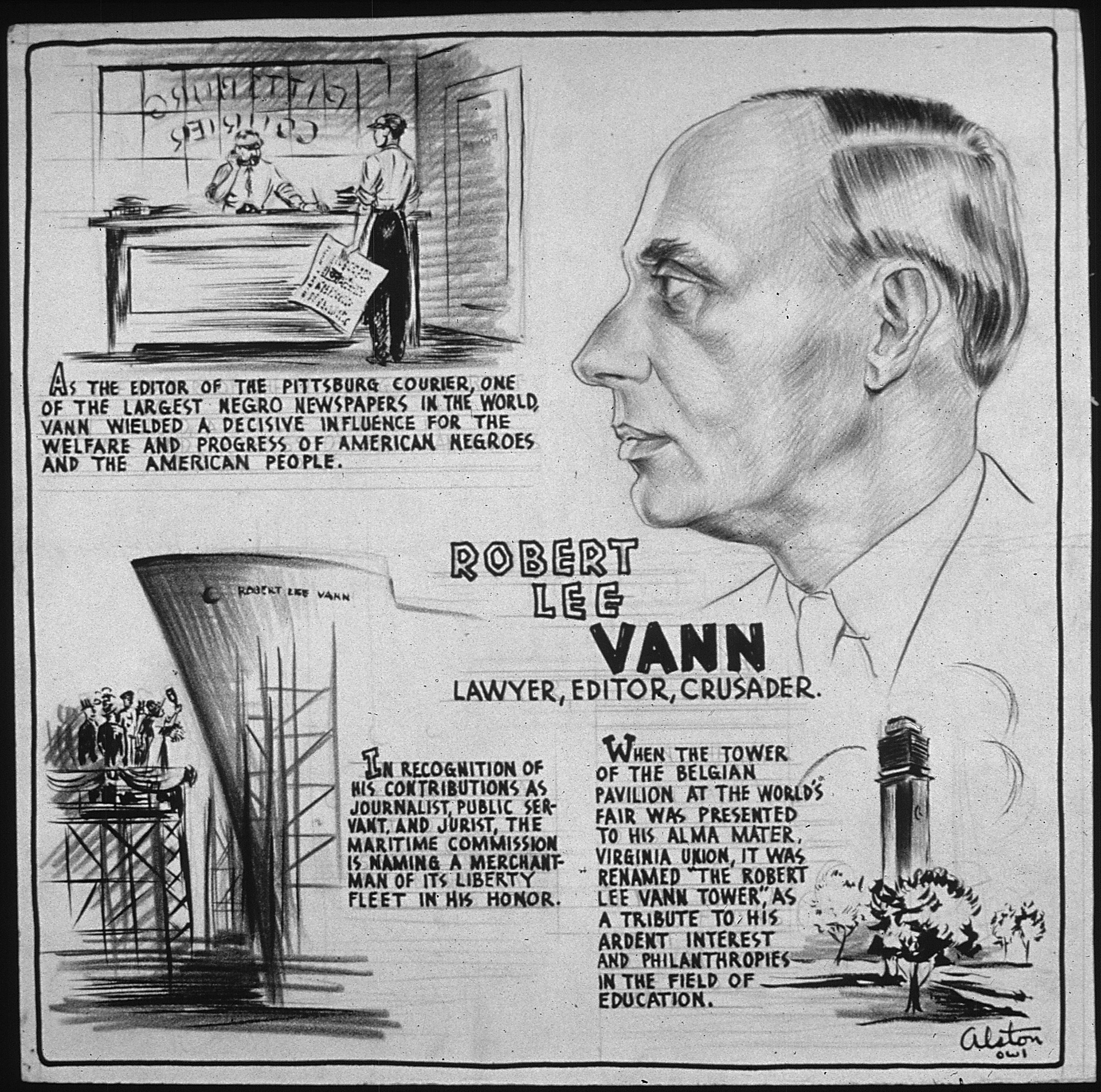
- Poster from the U.S. Office of War Information, 1943
- Born: August 27, 1879; Ahoskie, North Carolina, U.S.
- Died: October 24, 1940 (aged 61); Pittsburgh, Pennsylvania
- Education: Virginia Union University; University of Pittsburgh law school
- Occupations: Publisher, editor
- Known for: Pittsburgh Courier
- Spouse: Jessie Matthews Vann (m. 1919)

Robert Lee Vann (August 27, 1879 – October 24, 1940) was an African-American newspaper publisher and editor. He was the publisher and editor of the Pittsburgh Courier from 1910 until his death.

== Biography ==
He was born in Ahoskie, North Carolina, the son of Lucy Peoples and an unknown father. His parents had been enslaved. He graduated as valedictorian of Waters Training School in Winton, North Carolina, in 1901, and attended Wayland Academy and Virginia Union University in Richmond, Virginia, from 1901 to 1903. He then attended the University of Pittsburgh (then known as the Western University of Pennsylvania), and graduated from its law school in 1909, becoming Pitt Law's first African-American graduate. He passed the bar examination in 1909 and married Jessie Matthews from Gettysburg, Pennsylvania, on February 17, 1919.

Vann was one of only five black attorneys in Pittsburgh in 1910, a city with more than 25,000 African Americans. In early March 1910, Vann drew up incorporation papers for the Pittsburgh Courier and began writing contributions. Through Vann's connections, the paper was able to attract wealthy investors, including Cumberland Willis Posey Sr. On May 10, 1910, the Pittsburgh Courier was formally incorporated, with Vann handling the legal details. During the summer, the paper grew from four to eight pages, but struggled with circulation and financial solvency due to a small market and lack of interested advertisers. In the fall of 1910, original founder Edwin Nathaniel Harleston left the paper for financial and creative reasons, and Vann became editor.

The Courier under Vann prominently featured Vann's work as a lawyer and public figure. As editor, Vann wrote editorials encouraging readers to patronize only business that paid for advertisements in the Courier and ran contests to attempt to increase circulation. In his Christmas editorial at the end of 1914, Vann wrote of the paper's intent to "abolish every vestige of Jim Crowism in Pittsburgh."

In the 1920s, Vann made efforts to improve the quality of the news included in the growing paper. Under Vann, the "Local News" section of the Courier covered the social lives of the upper- and middle-class members of Pittsburgh's Hill District. This included accounts of vacations, marriages, and parties of prominent families and the goings on of local groups, such as the Pittsburgh Frogs. Vann legitimized the Courier with a professional staff, national advertisements, a dedicated printing plant, and wide circulation.

Vann stirred up controversy and 10,000 new readers by hiring George Schuyler in 1925, whose editorials and opinions made him famous as the "black H.L. Mencken" (who was a Courier subscriber). Under Vann, the Courier also worked as a tool for social progress. Most significantly, the paper extensively covered the injustices on African Americans perpetrated by the Pullman Company and supported the Brotherhood of Sleeping Car Porters. Vann wrote to gain support for causes such as improved housing conditions in the Hill District, better education for black students, and equal employment and union opportunities. However, Vann often used his Courier editorials to publicly fight with the National Association for the Advancement of Colored People (NAACP) and W. E. B. Du Bois over issues such as President Calvin Coolidge's grants of clemency to black soldiers involved in the Houston Riot and Vann's allegations that James Weldon Johnson embezzled money for personal use from the NAACP and the Garland Fund. This disharmony was resolved in 1929 by published apologies by Vann, Du Bois, and Johnson, and within the decade, Du Bois became a regular Courier contributor. But in 1938, Vann's Courier ended up at odds with the NAACP once again. Vann, through national campaigns and contact with President Franklin D. Roosevelt pursued inclusion of African-American units in the United States Armed Forces. Vann saw this as an achievable step on the path to integration of the military, but the NAACP leadership, primarily Walter White, publicly disagreed with this half-measure, despite the protests of Thurgood Marshall. As a result of the Courier's influence and Vann's political clout, New York Congressman Fish successfully added an amendment prohibiting racial discrimination in selection and training of men drafted to the Selective Training and Service Act of 1940.

In 1932, Vann officially put the Courier behind the party realignment of African Americans. He urged readers to vote for Democrats, writing: "My friends, go home and turn Lincoln's picture to the wall." This was at a time, 1932, when the Democrats were running on a platform of lower taxes and Franklin Roosevelt was denouncing Herbert Hoover a "socialist". Robert Lee Vann supported Republican Wendall Willkie against President Roosevelt in 1940.

After achieving prominence as the head of the Courier, Vann served as Special Assistant to U.S. Attorney General Homer Cummings from 1933 until 1935. Largely neglected and even ill-treated (staff stenographers often refused to take dictation from him because he was black), Vann could not get an appointment to see the Attorney General and in fact may never have met the man while in Washington. Vann resigned in 1935 to return to the Pittsburgh Courier; by 1938, the paper was the largest American black weekly, with a circulation of 250,000.

In 1939, Vann founded Interstate United Newspapers, Inc., an agency formed to sell advertising to the black press. Vann's widow succeeded him as president of Interstate United Newspapers.

== Death and legacy ==
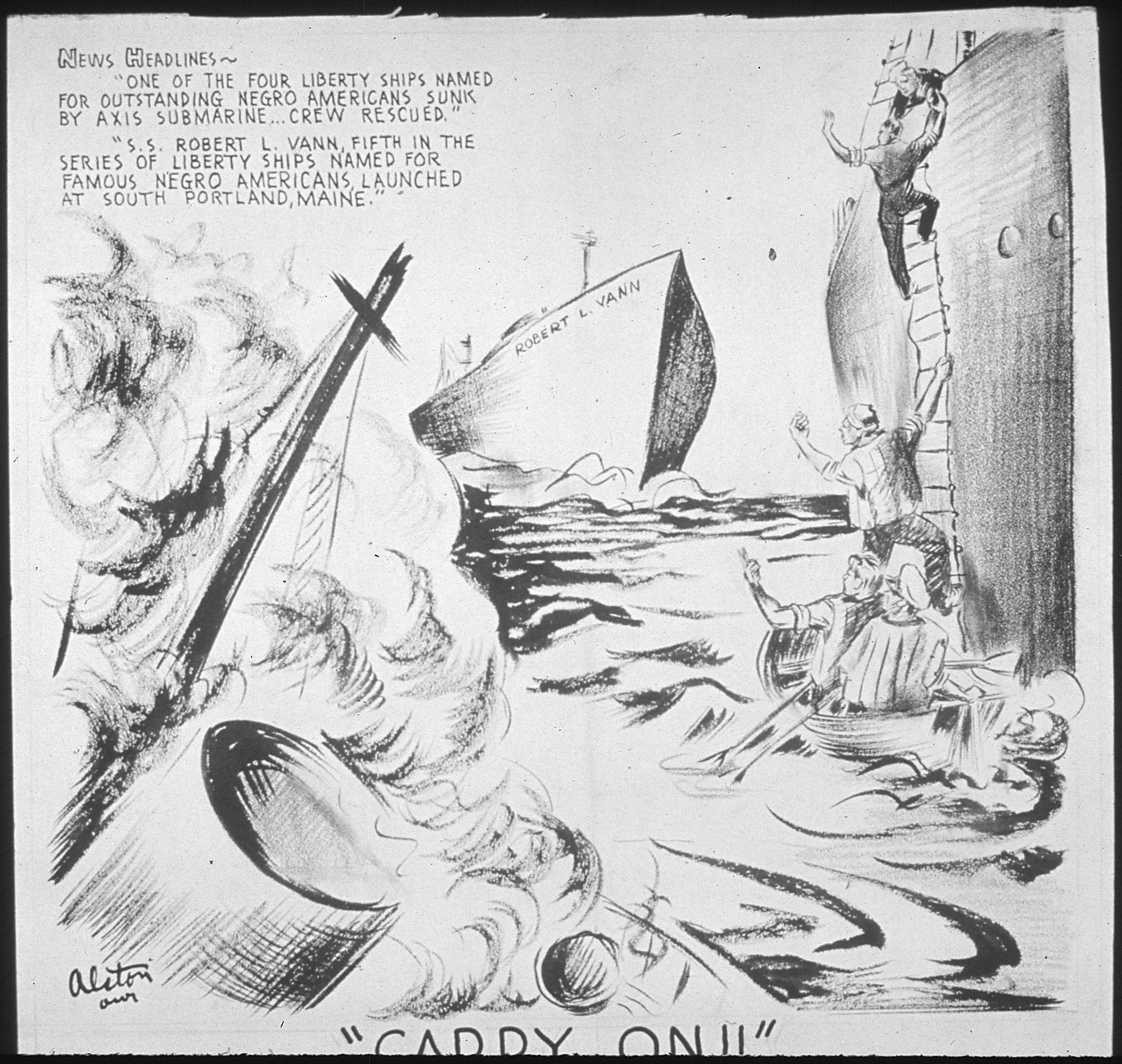
A Charles Alston cartoon commemorating the launch of SS Robert L. Vann

Vann is entombed at Homewood Cemetery, Allegheny County, Pennsylvania. The Liberty Ship SS Robert L. Vann was launched 10 October 10, 1943, in Portland, Maine, with his widow Jessie Matthews Vann attending the launch. The ship was hit by an underwater mine on March 1, 1945, and sunk. Records show the entire crew survived.

A Pennsylvania State historical marker is placed at the corner of Center Avenue and Frances Street, Pittsburgh, Pennsylvania, noting Vann's accomplishments. The former Robert L. Vann Elementary School, Pittsburgh, Pennsylvania, was named in his honor. The Robert L. Vann School in Ahoskie, North Carolina, is named in his honor.

The Belgian Tower at the 1939 New York World's Fair was later transported to Virginia Union University and renamed the Robert L. Vann Memorial Tower.

== See also ==
- African-American business history
