= Waters Normal Institute =

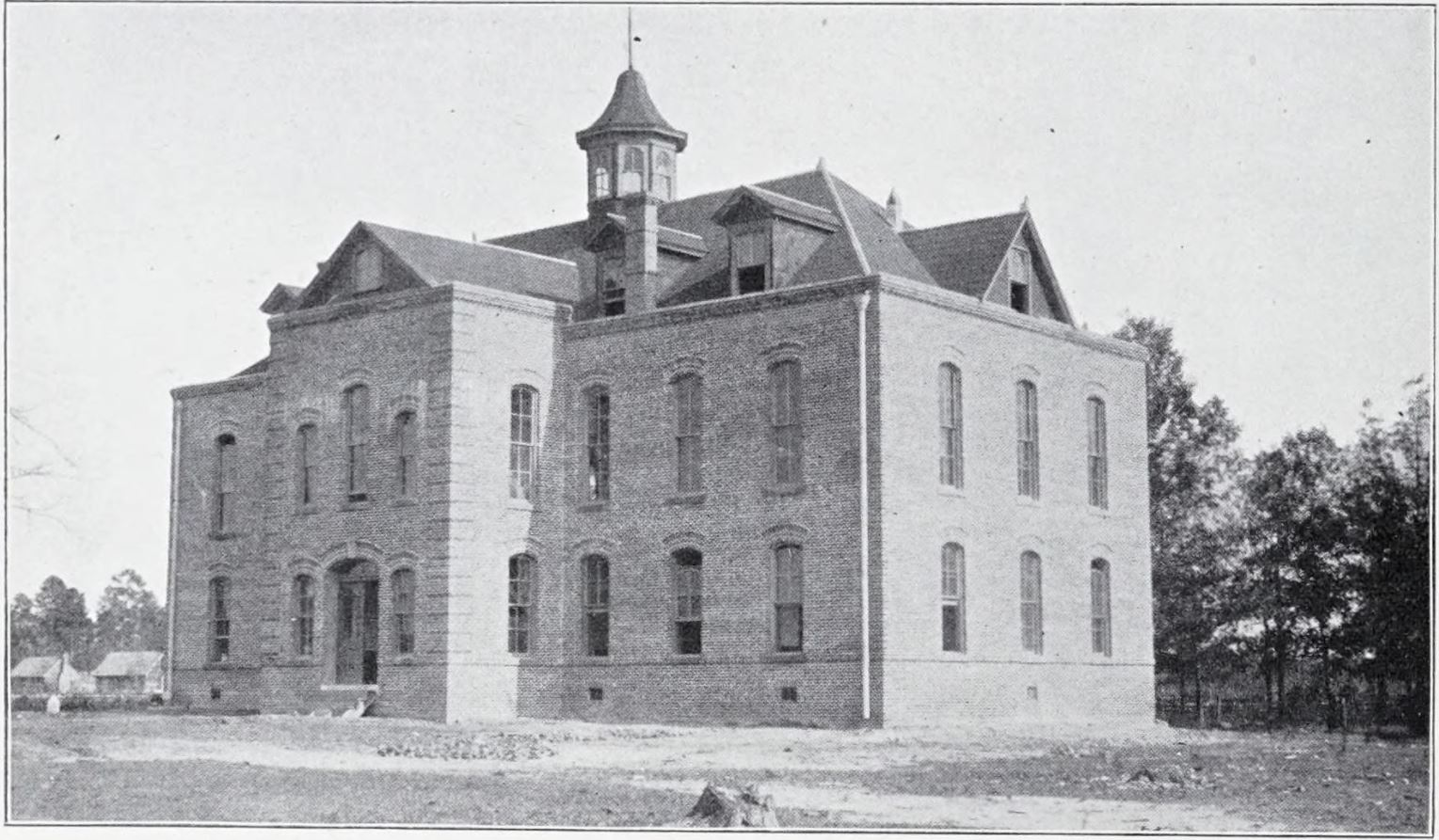
Morehouse Hall at Waters Normal Institute, c. 1910

Waters Normal Institute, originally Winton Academy and then Chosen Academy before becoming Calvin S. Brown School, was a school in Winton, North Carolina. Winton Academy was incorporated as a "colored school" March 7, 1887, by the North Carolina General Assembly. It had 15 trustees.

Calvin Scott Brown served as the school's principal until his death in 1936. The school's C. S. Brown School Auditorium is listed on the National Register of Historic Places.

The school later became a public school for colored children serving grades kindergarten through twelve. Enrollment began to decline in the middle of the 20th century as the local population dropped. In 1970 Hertford County integrated its schools and began assigning students to schools elsewhere. Enrollment declined further and in 1972 the school ceased offering high school courses and became a school serving grades kindergarten through eight. As enrollment continued to decline, the public school system turned the facility into the C.S. Brown Student Development Center which hosted special 45-day courses for students with poor behavior. In 2008 it was transformed into a school for academically struggling students. In 2013 it became a STEM school.
