= Grey House =

Grey House may refer to:

== Places ==
In Denmark

- Greu House, a building in the Carlsberg district of Copenhagen

In the United States (by state)

- Zane Grey Estate, Altadena, California, NRHP-listed
- Zane Grey House, Lackawaxen, Pennsylvania, NRHP-listed

== Other ==
- The Grey House, a 1926 German silent film
- Grey House (play), a 2019 Chicago and 2023 Broadway stage thriller
- Grey House Publishing, a company
- Gray House (Kraków), Płaszów Nazi concentration camp head's villa (portrayed in movie Schindler's List)

== See also ==
- Gray House (disambiguation)
- Greystone (disambiguation)
- Grey Columns, Tuskegee, Alabama, listed on the NRHP in Macon County, Alabama
- Grey Towers Castle, Glenside, Pennsylvania, NRHP-listed
- Mission Grey House, a 2025 Indian Hindi-language suspense thriller film
