= John Gray House =

John Gray House may refer to:

- Rev. John H. Gray House, Eutaw, Alabama, listed on the National Register of Historic Places (NRHP)
- John Gray House (Port Matilda, Pennsylvania), listed on the NRHP in Centre County, Pennsylvania
- John P. and Stella Gray House, Coeur d'Alene, Idaho, listed on the NRHP in Kootenai County, Idaho
- John Gray Springhouse, Elkton, Kentucky, listed on the NRHP in Todd County, Kentucky
