= King Parker House =

Historic house in North Carolina, United States

- U.S. National Register of Historic Places
- Location within North Carolina Location within the United States
- Location: 304 Mount Moriah Rd., near Winton, North Carolina
- Coordinates: 36°23′15″N 76°59′32″W
- Area: 27 acres (11 ha)
- Built: c. 1850
- Architectural style: Greek Revival
- NRHP reference No.: 02001663
- Added to NRHP: December 31, 2002

King Parker House is a historic home located near Winton, Hertford County, North Carolina. It was built about 1850, and is a two-story, three-bay, single-pile vernacular Greek Revival style frame dwelling. It has a low-pitched, side-gable roof and front portico with vernacular Italianate fretwork. The house encompasses an 18th-century, one-room, 1 1/2-story, gable-roofed building.

It was listed on the National Register of Historic Places in 2002.
