= Mariam Petrosyan =

Armenian painter, cartoonist and novelist

- Մարիամ Պետրոսյան
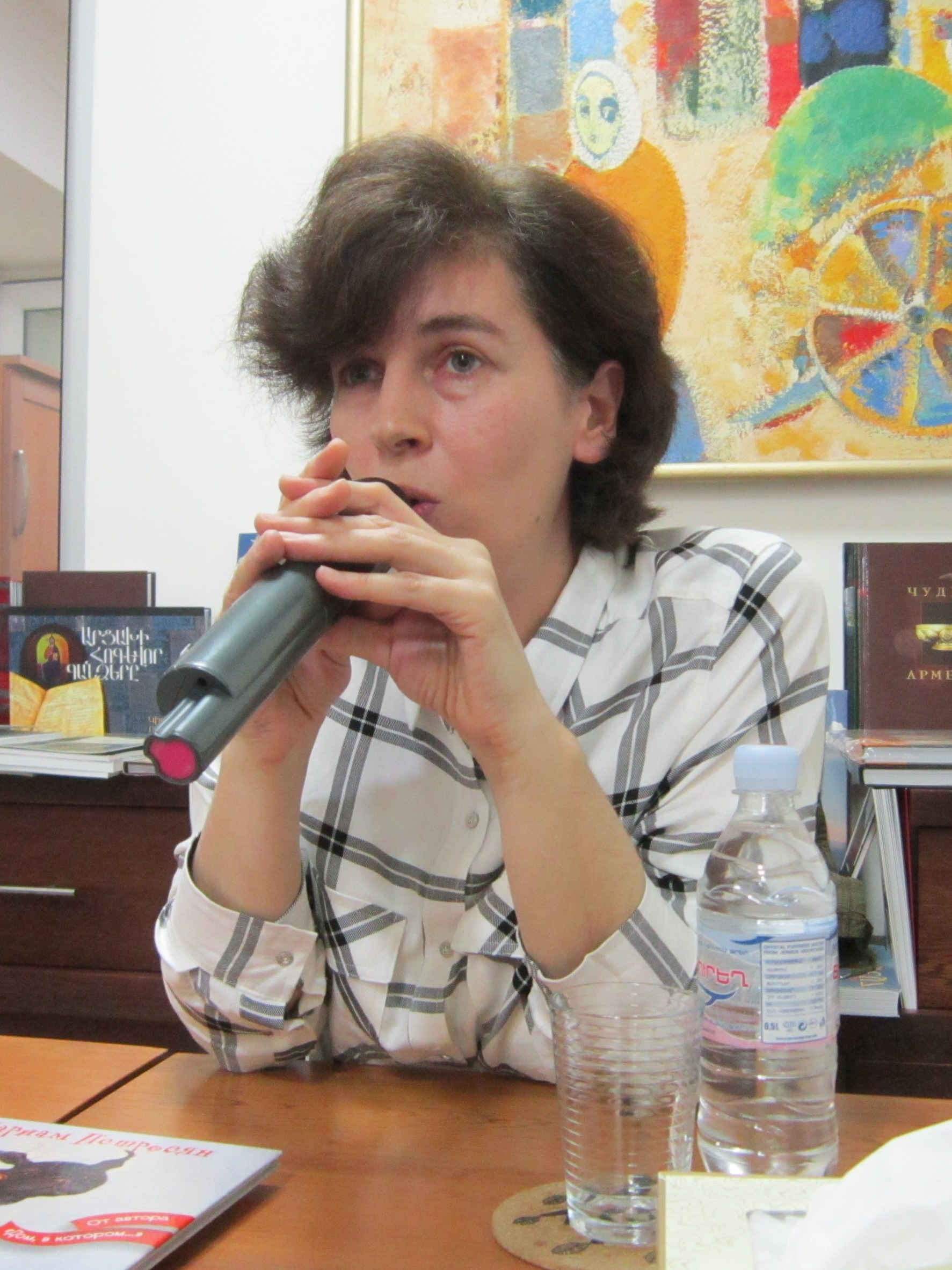
- Born: 10 August 1969 (age 57); Yerevan, Soviet Armenia
- Occupations: Novelist, cartoonist
- Spouse: Artashes Stamboltsyan
- Writing career
- Genre: Magic Realism
- Notable work: The Gray House (2009)
- Notable awards: 2009 Big Book Readers' Sympathy Prize (3rd)
- Literary movement: Modernism, Postmodernism

Mariam Petrosyan (Armenian: Մարիամ Պետրոսյան, born 10 August 1969) is an Armenian painter, cartoonist and Russian-language novelist. She is best known as the author of the award-winning novel The Gray House (2009), translated into eight languages.

== Biography ==
Mariam Petrosyan was born in 1969 in Yerevan, the capital of Armenia. After finishing at art college she became a cartoonist at the Studio of Armenfilm. Later she moved to Moscow to work at Soyuzmultfilm, but came back to Yerevan in 1995 and returned to Armenfilm. She worked there until 2007.

Her first novel, The Gray House (Russian: Дом, в котором...; lit. 'The House, in Which...'), tells of a boarding school for disabled children and was published in Russian in 2009, becoming a bestseller. It was nominated for the Russian Booker Prize in 2010 and received several awards and nominations, among them the 2009 Russian Prize for the best book in Russian by an author living abroad.

The book has been translated into Italian (La casa del tempo sospeso, 2011), Hungarian (Abban a házban, 2012), Polish (Dom, w którym..., 2013), Spanish (La casa de los otros, 2015), French (La Maison dans laquelle, 2016), Czech (Dům, ve kterém, 2016), and Macedonian (Домот во кој..., 2016) languages.

The worldwide English edition came out on 25 April 2017, from AmazonCrossing; it has been shortlisted for the 2018 Read Russia Prize. Selling rights for Danish, Latvian and Norwegian translations were also announced by Petrosyan's literary agency.

Excerpts from the novel (in English translation by Andrew Bromfield) were narrated by Stephen Fry in the film Russia's Open Book: Writing in the Age of Putin.

The only other book by the author to date is a short fairy tale, The Dog Who Could Fly (Russian: "Сказка про собаку, которая умела летать", 2014).

== Personal life ==
Mariam is married to Armenian graphic artist Artashes Stamboltsyan. They have two children. She is a great-granddaughter of the painter Martiros Saryan.
