= C. S. Brown School Auditorium =

Historic building in North Carolina, United States

- U.S. National Register of Historic Places
- U.S. Historic district
- Location within North Carolina Location within the United States
- Location: Off NC 45, Winton, North Carolina
- Coordinates: 36°23′6″N 76°56′18″W
- Area: 8.5 acres (3.4 ha)
- Built: 1926
- Architectural style: Colonial Revival
- NRHP reference No.: 85001657
- Added to NRHP: July 29, 1985

C. S. Brown School Auditorium, also known as Brown Hall, is a historic school auditorium and national historic district located at Winton, Hertford County, North Carolina. It was built in 1926, and is a one-story stuccoed tile block building in the Colonial Revival style. It consists of a five-bay central pavilion with hip roof and flanking classroom wings. The front facade features a pedimented portico with four original Doric order columns. It is the oldest intact and unaltered building associated with the Calvin Scott Brown School, a school for African-American students founded by Calvin Scott Brown (1859–1936).

It was listed on the National Register of Historic Places in 1985.
