= Benajah Gray Log House =

Historic house in Tennessee, United States

- Gray, Benajah, Log House
- U.S. National Register of Historic Places
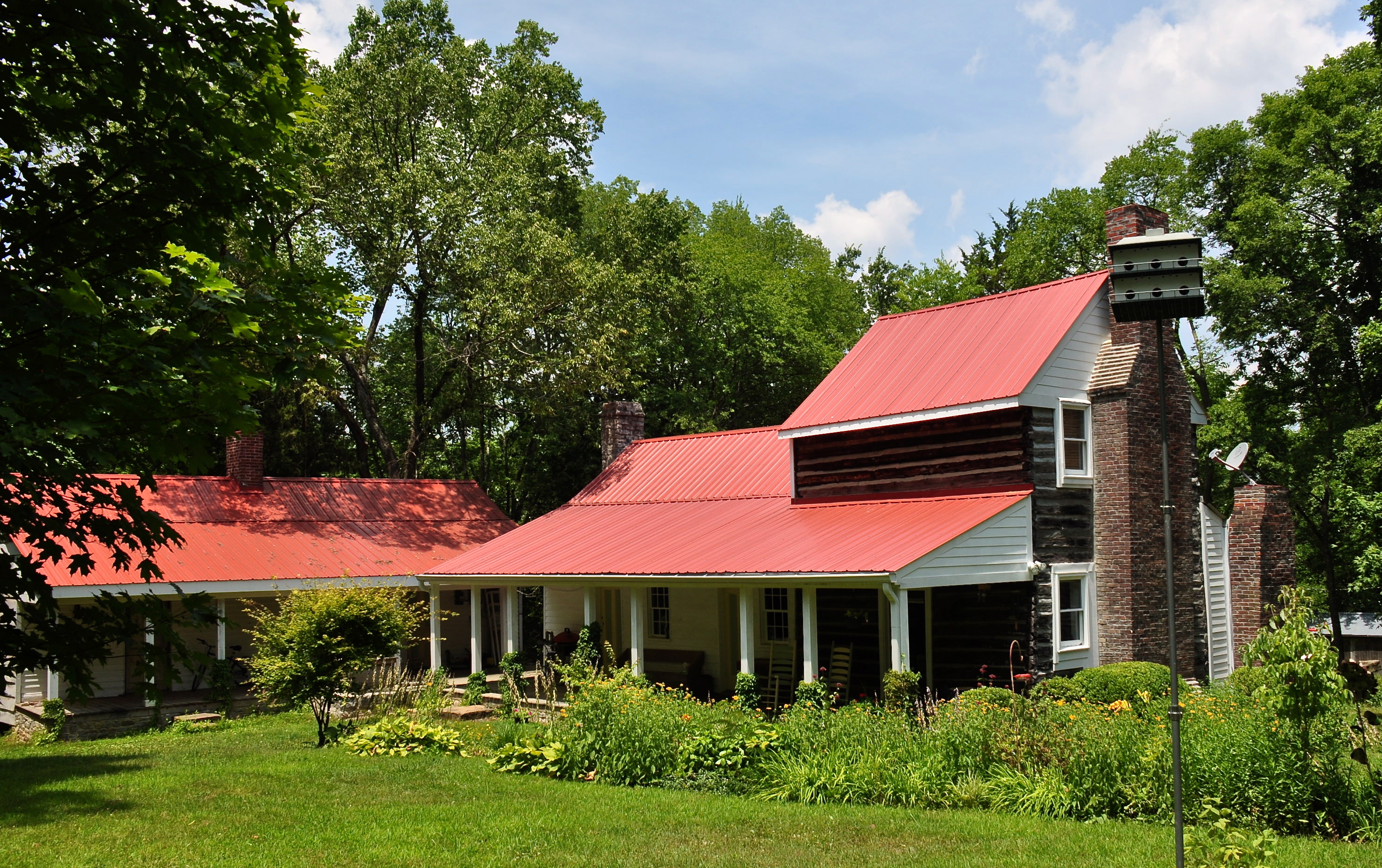
- The house in 2014

- Location within Tennessee
- Nearest city: Cane Ridge, Tennessee
- Coordinates: 35°59′36″N 86°37′31″W
- Area: 26 acres (11 ha)
- Built: 1805
- Built by: Gray, Benajah
- Architectural style: Double pen log
- NRHP reference No.: 85001512
- Added to NRHP: July 11, 1985

The Benajah Gray Log House is a historic loghouse in Antioch, Tennessee, United States.

== History ==
The land was granted to Lardner Clark in 1784. In the early 1800s Benajay Gray, the son of American Revolutionary War veteran James Gray, purchased some acres of land. He proceeded to build the log house by 1805. By the 1870s, it had become a horsebreeding farm. It was subsequently inherited by his descendants, and in the 1980s it belonged to Gray's great-great-granddaughter, Ernestine Huffman.

The house has been listed on the National Register of Historic Places since July 11, 1985.
