= Sprague House (Ithaca, New York) =

Historic house in New York, United States

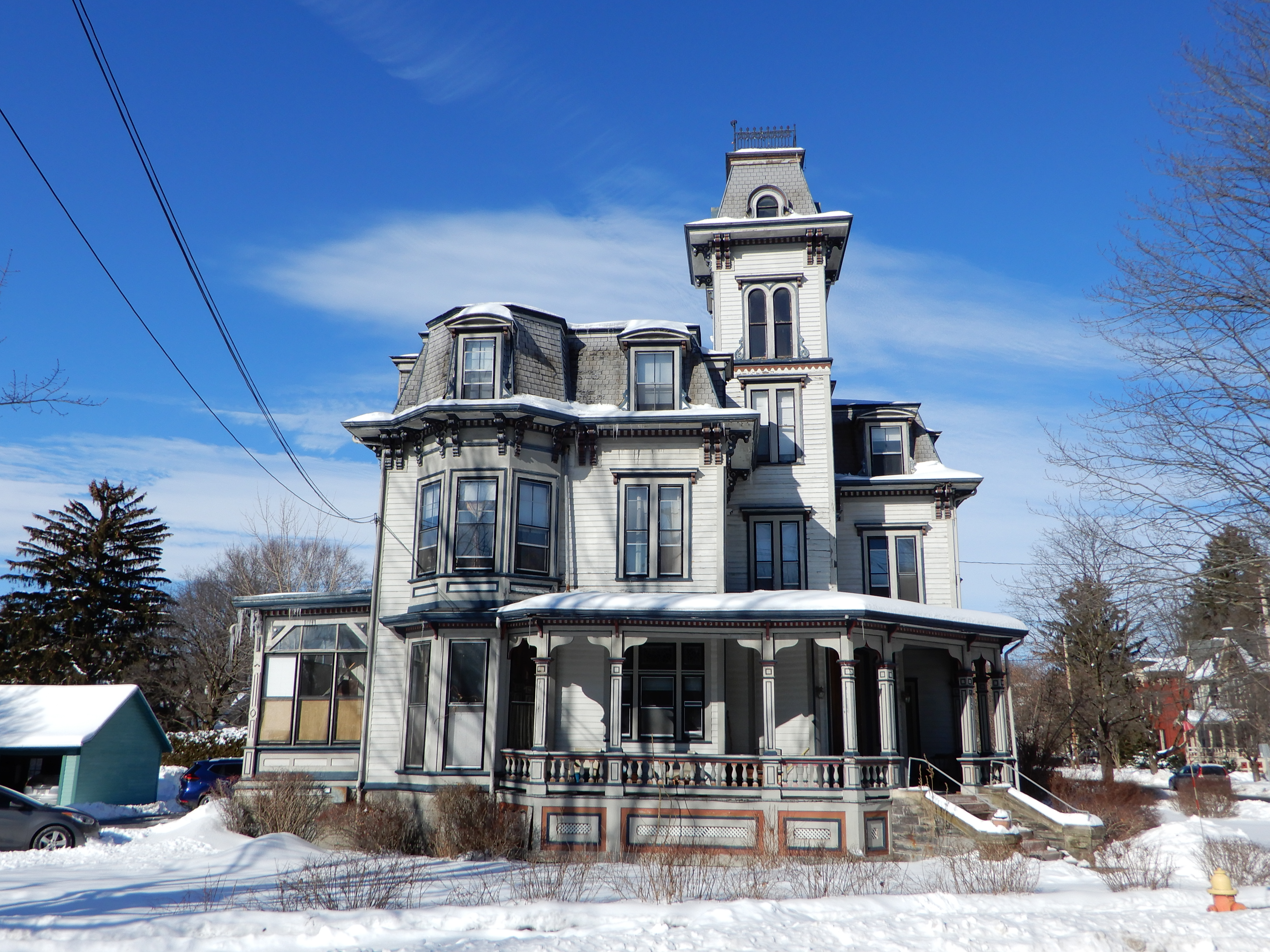
- The Sprague House in Ithaca, New York
- Click on the map for a fullscreen view

General information
- Architectural style: Second Empire
- Location: 412 S. Albany St.
- Coordinates: 42.434782°N 76.501801°W

The Sprague House is a historic house located at 412 South Albany Street in Ithaca, Tompkins County, New York.

== History ==
The house was built in 1871 by Charles Titus. After channelling the Six Mile Creek, Titus became a real estate developer for the now buildable land located immediately south of Downtown Ithaca. Titus soon sold the house to his in-laws, Joseph and Louisa Sprague.

== Description ==
The house is located at 412 South Albany Street in the Henry St. John Historic District, not far from Downtown Ithaca.

The building, occupying a corner lot, features a Second Empire style, which was popular in the United States when the house was built. With two main levels and a Mansard roof, the building has a complex floor plan. An ornate corner turret, adorned with a wrought iron crest, distinguishes the facades facing south and east.

== Gallery ==
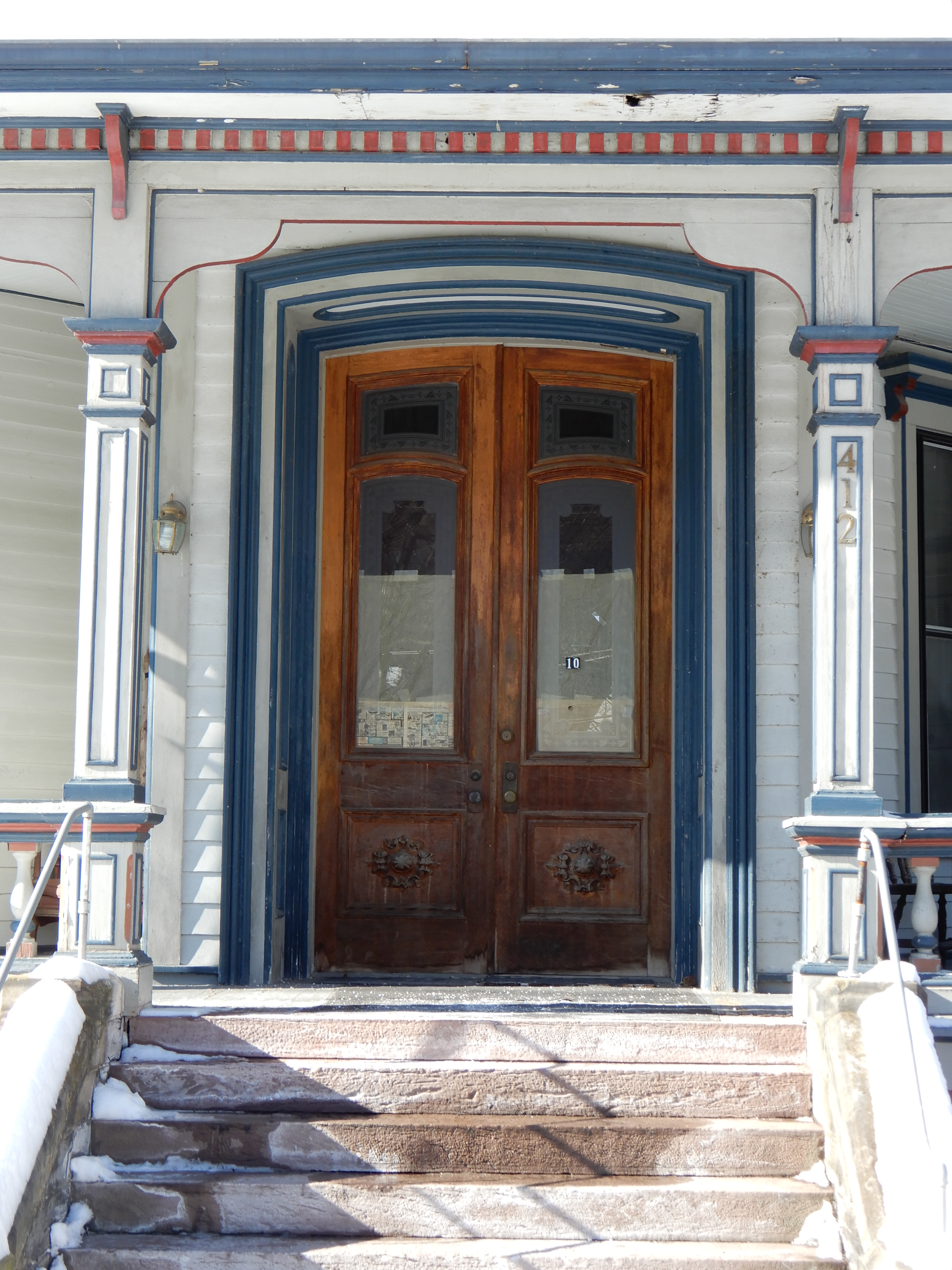

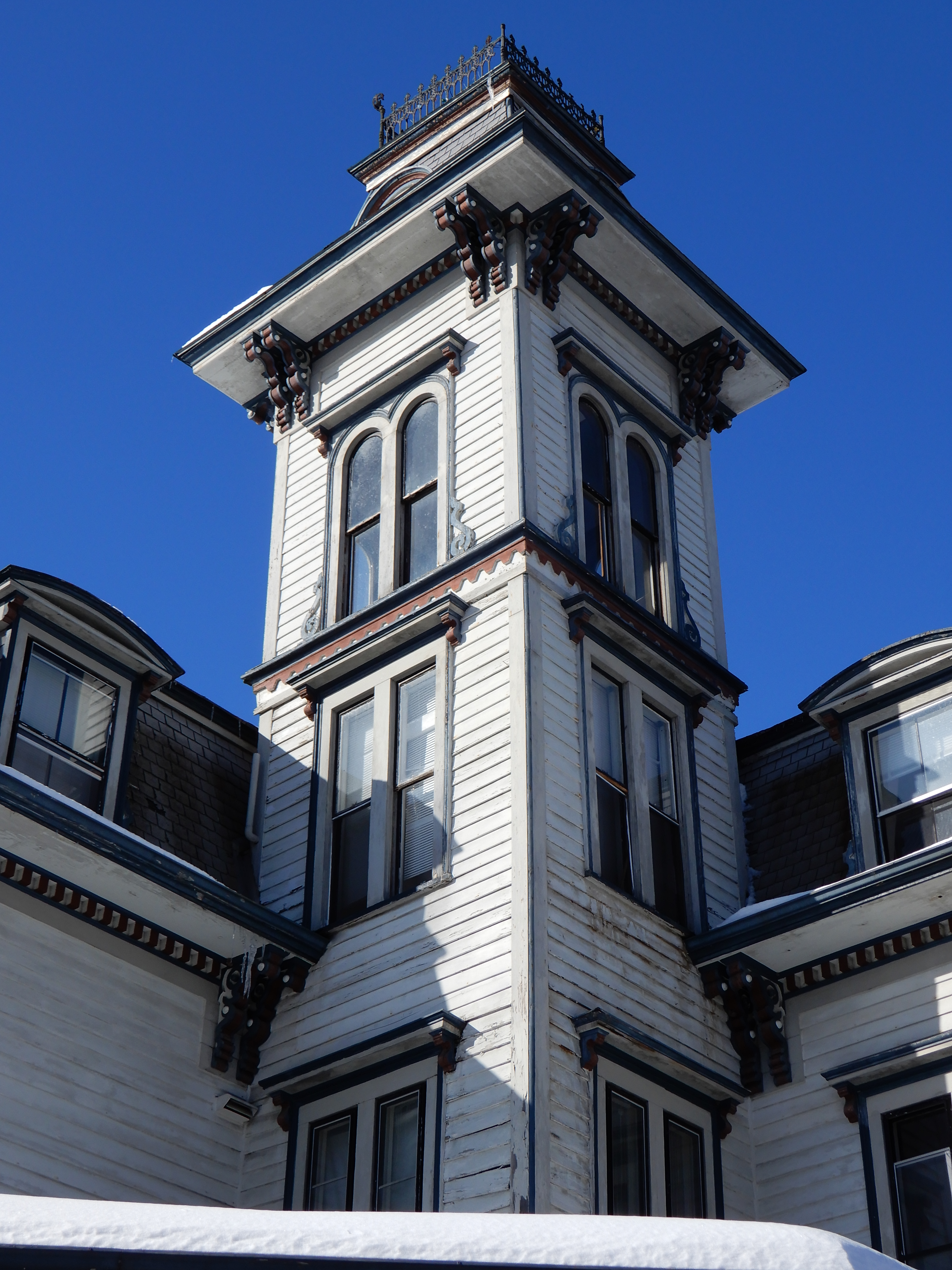

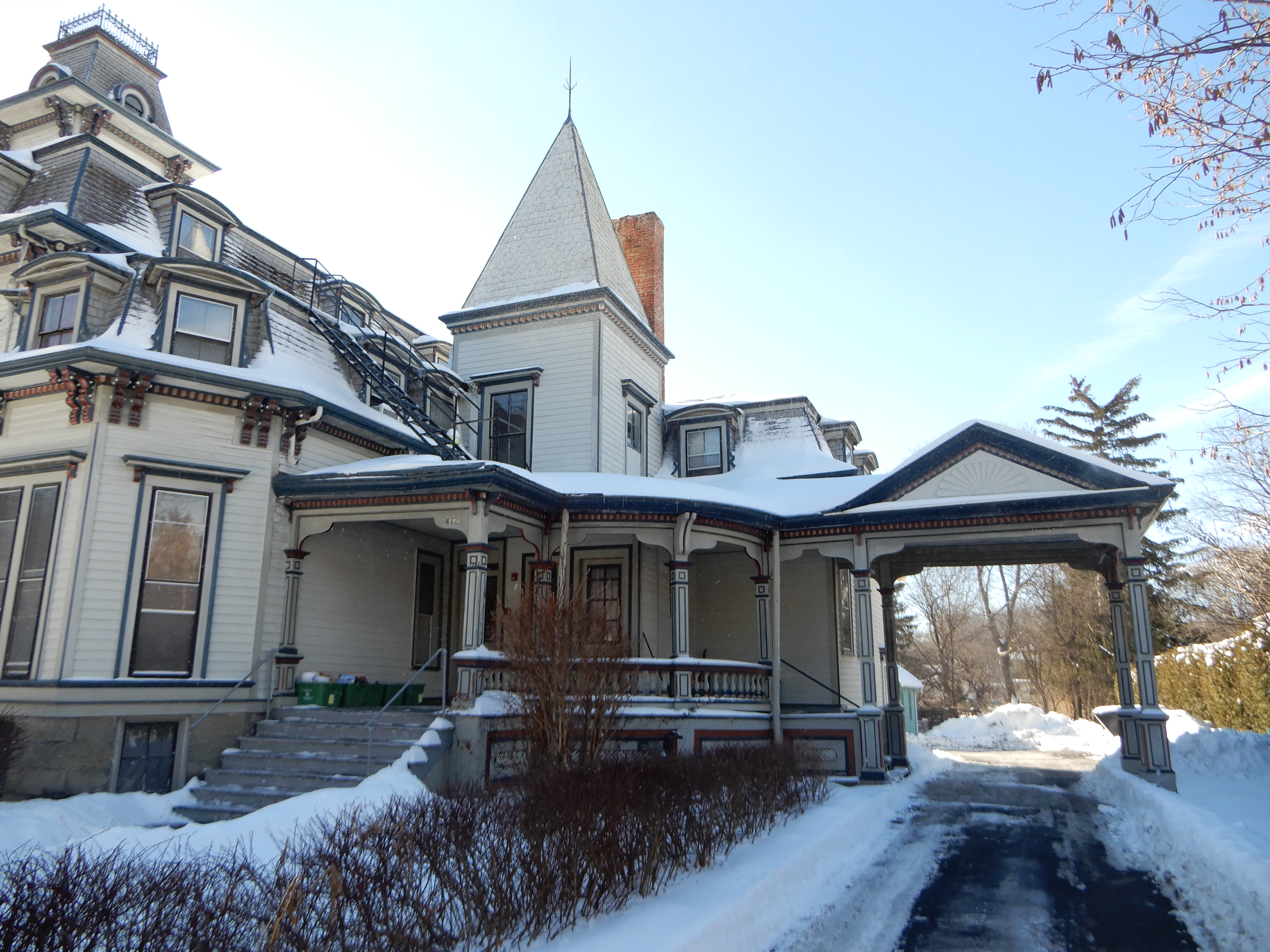
