= Gray-Kincaid House =

Historic house in Arkansas, United States

- U.S. National Register of Historic Places
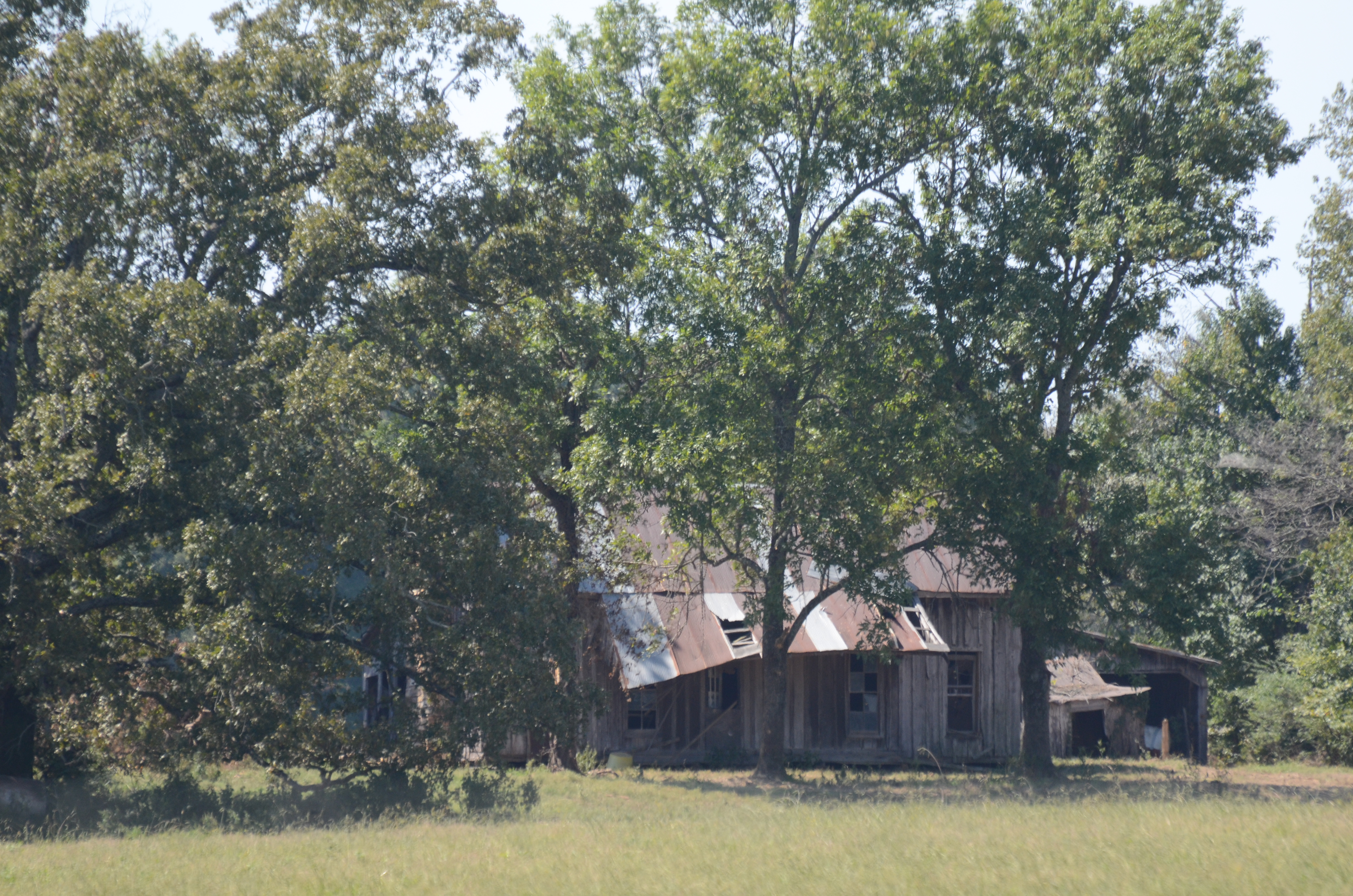

- Location within Arkansas Location within the United States
- Nearest city: Crosby, Arkansas
- Coordinates: 35°19′1″N 91°49′17″W
- Area: less than one acre
- Built: 1910
- Architectural style: Vernacular single pile center
- MPS: White County MPS
- NRHP reference No.: 91001335
- Added to NRHP: July 21, 1992

The Gray-Kincaid House is a historic house in rural White County, Arkansas. It is located about 0.5 miles (0.80 km) southeast of the junction of County Roads 46 and 759, northeast of the small community of Crosby and northwest of Searcy. It is a single-story wood-frame structure, with a side gable roof and board and batten siding. A shed-roof extension extends across the southern facade, while the principal (north-facing) facade has an entry near its center and four sash windows. A stone chimney rises from the eastern end. The house was built as a traditional dogtrot in about 1910, with an attached rear ell, but the latter was destroyed in a storm in the 1940s, and the dogtrot breezeway has been enclosed, transforming the house into center-hall plan structure.

The house was listed on the National Register of Historic Places in 1992.

== See also ==
- National Register of Historic Places listings in White County, Arkansas
