= Henry P. Gray House =

Historic house in Tennessee, United States

- U.S. National Register of Historic Places
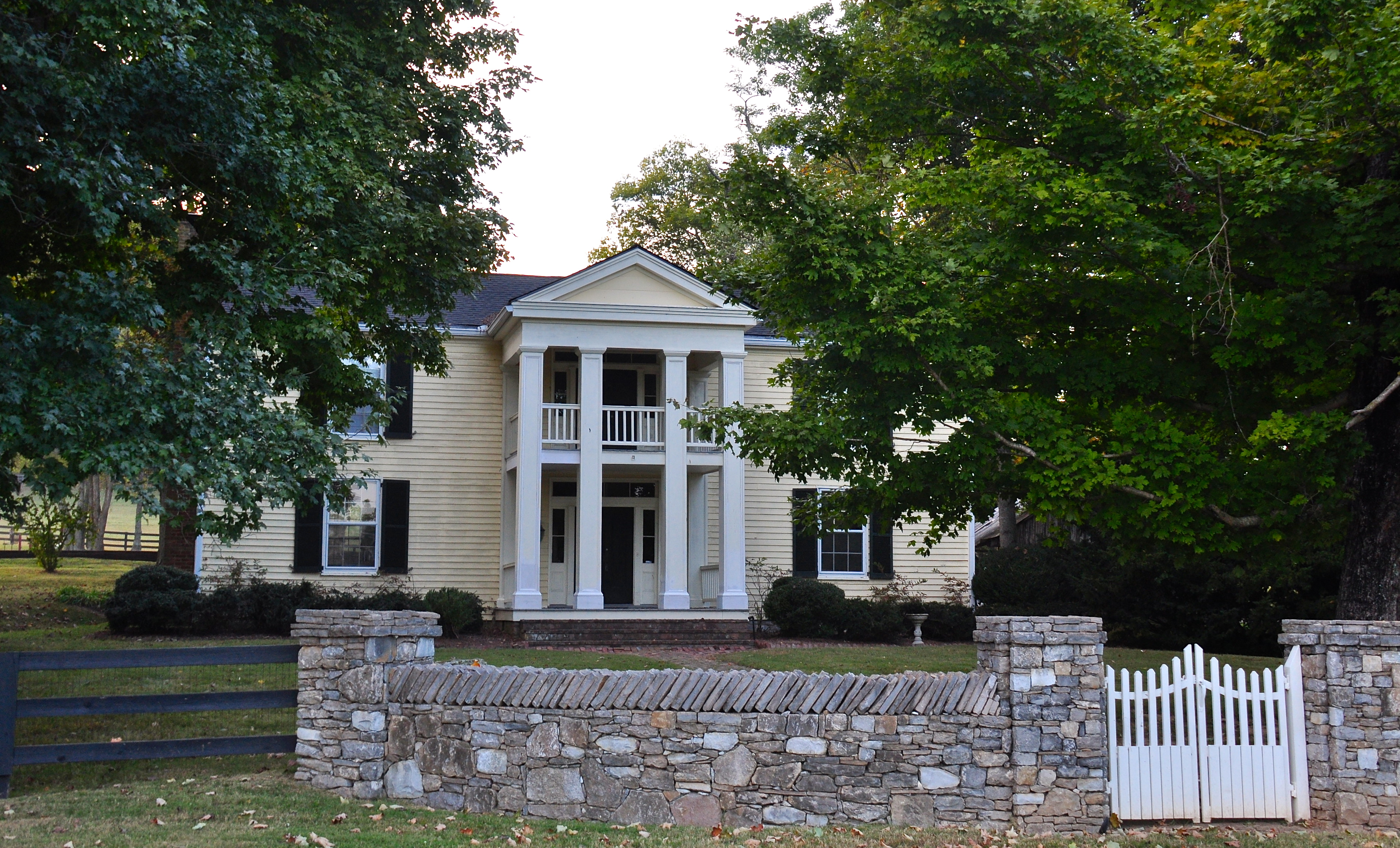
- Henry P. Gray House, September 2014.

- Location within Tennessee Location within the United States
- Location: Old Hillsboro Rd. at Boyd Mill Rd., Franklin, Tennessee
- Coordinates: 35°55′30″N 86°58′21″W
- Area: 1 acre (0.40 ha)
- Built: c. 1845
- Architectural style: Greek Revival, Central passage plan
- MPS: Williamson County MRA
- NRHP reference No.: 88000313
- Added to NRHP: April 13, 1988

The Henry P. Gray House is a building in Franklin, Tennessee, United States, dating from c. 1845. It was listed on the National Register of Historic Places in 1988. It shows Greek Revival and Central passage plan architecture.

When listed the property included one contributing building and three non-contributing structures, on an area of 1 acre (0.40 ha). The property was covered in a 1988 study of Williamson County historical resources.
