= Grey Columns =

Historic building in Tuskeegee, Alabama, USA

- U.S. National Register of Historic Places
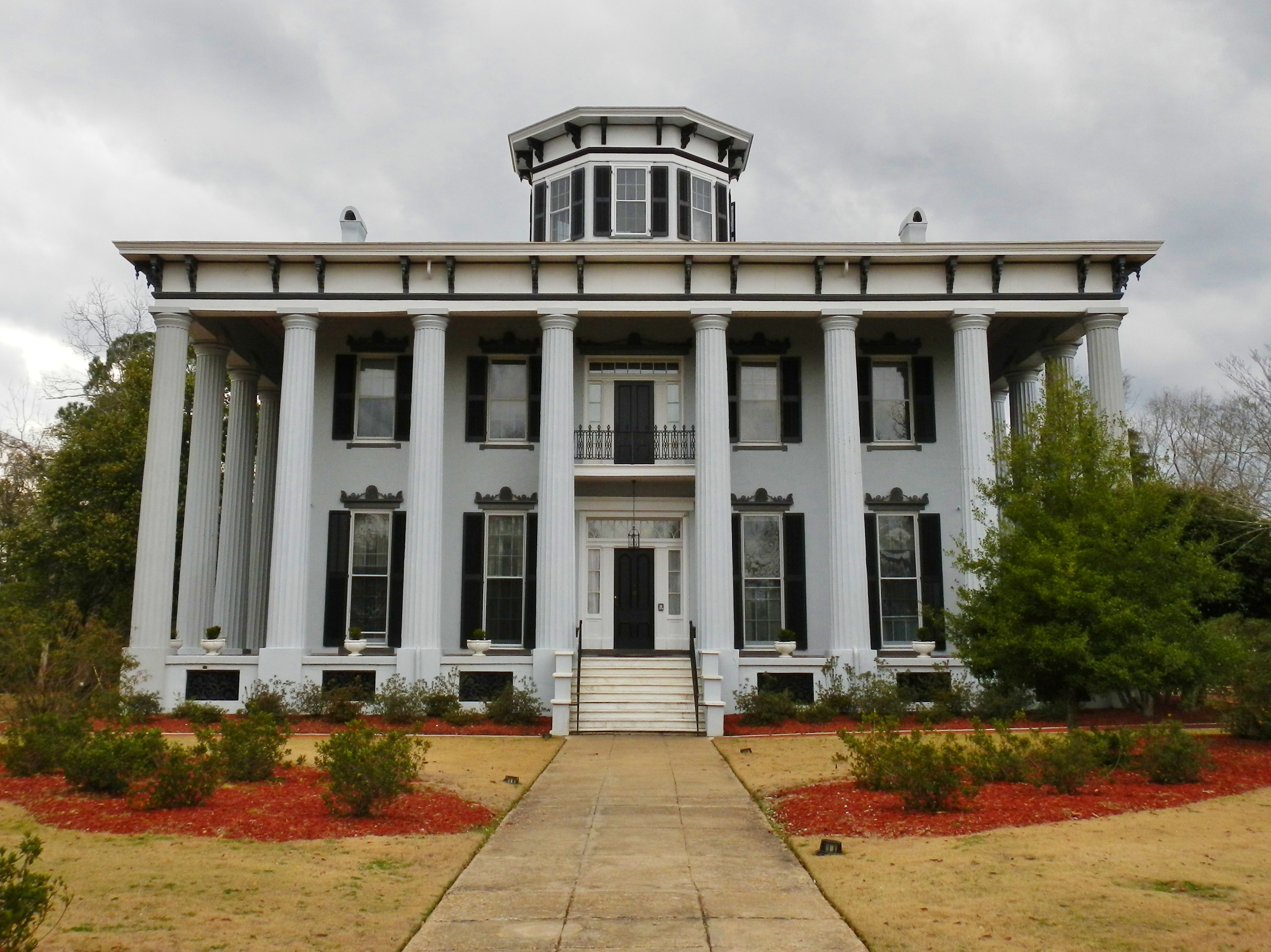

- Location within Alabama Location within the United States
- Location: 399 Old Montgomery Rd., Tuskegee, Alabama
- Coordinates: 32°25′27″N 85°41′59″W
- Area: 6 acres (2.4 ha)
- Built: 1854
- Built by: William Varner
- Architectural style: Greek Revival, Italianate
- NRHP reference No.: 80000364
- Added to NRHP: January 11, 1980

Grey Columns, at 399 Old Montgomery Rd. in Tuskegee, Alabama, was built as a plantation house from 1854 to 1857. It was listed on the National Register of Historic Places in 1980. It now serves as the home of the president of Tuskegee University.

It was built by William Varner principally in Greek Revival style, but with elements of the Italianate. It has an octagonal cupola. It was built at the center of a 5,000 acres (20 km^{2}) cotton plantation.

The listing also includes a contributing structure, which is an addition built around 1920. Former outbuildings and slave quarters are no longer present.

It was documented by the Historic American Buildings Survey in 1934 and in 1978.
