= David Sprague House =

Historic house in Rhode Island, United States

- U.S. National Register of Historic Places
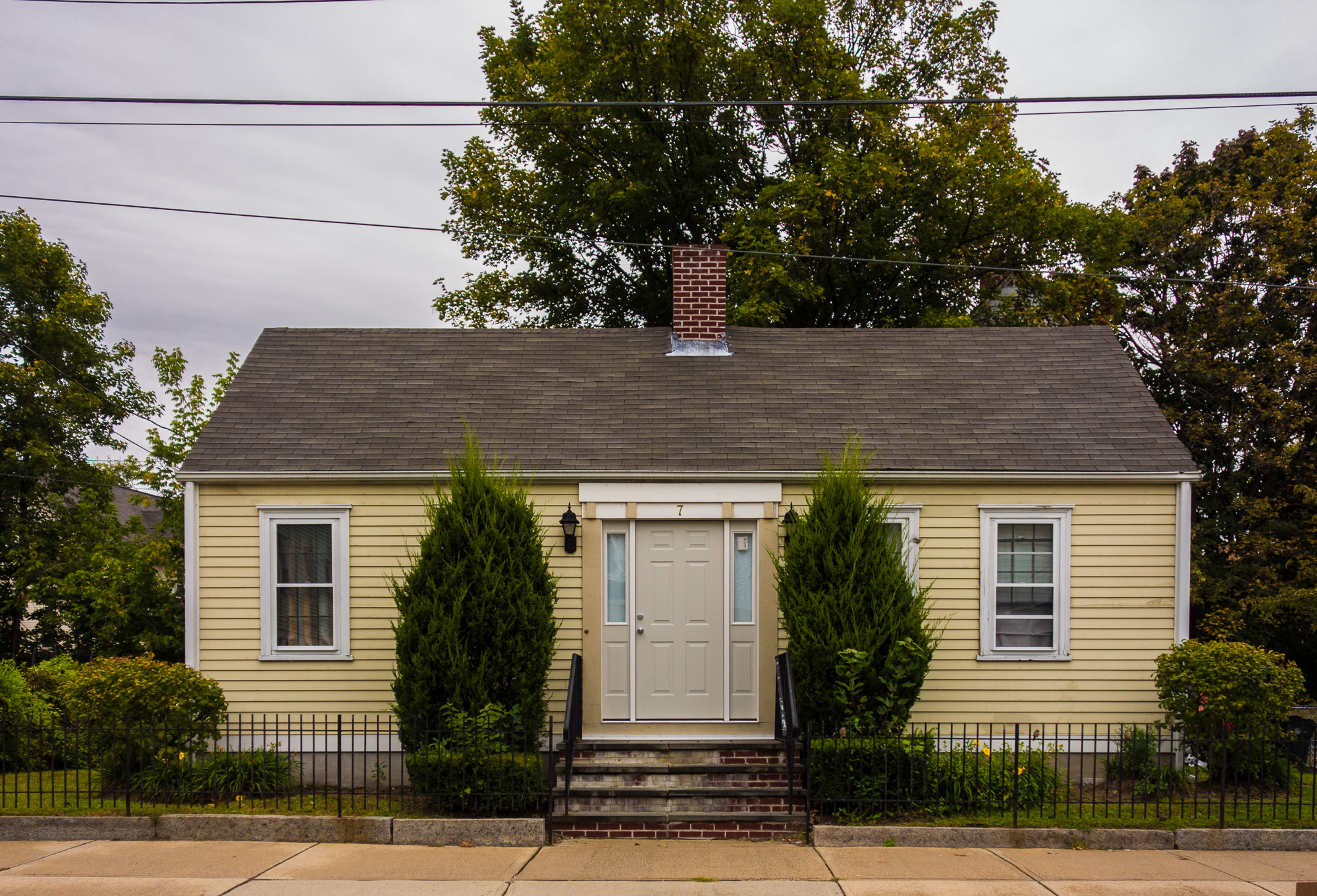

- Location within Rhode Island Location within the United States
- Location: 7 Harvard Avenue, Providence, Rhode Island
- Coordinates: 41°48′31.5174″N 71°25′5.4552″W
- Built: 1839
- Architectural style: Federal
- NRHP reference No.: 78000010
- Added to NRHP: May 23, 1978

The David Sprague House is an historic house in Providence, Rhode Island. The house was built in 1839 and added to the National Register of Historic Places in 1978.

== History ==
The house was originally located at 263 Public Street, which was then a "rural hinterland" with few residences. When the horsecar line was introduced to the South Providence neighborhood in 1865, the house became surrounded by larger Victorian style houses. By the mid-1930s, the neighborhood was "noted for its antiquity and quaint architecture." However, forty years later the neighborhood fell into disrepair, leaving the Sprague House as the neighborhood's most well-preserved landmark. This led the Providence Preservation Society to nominate the building for inclusion on the National Register of Historic Places in 1978.

By the 1990s, the Sprague House, now falling into disrepair, was named on the Providence Preservation Society's "Most Endangered List" in 1998, 1999, and 2000.

Around 2000, the decaying building was restored, and moved to a new location at 7 Harvard Avenue, which was deemed "more suitable."

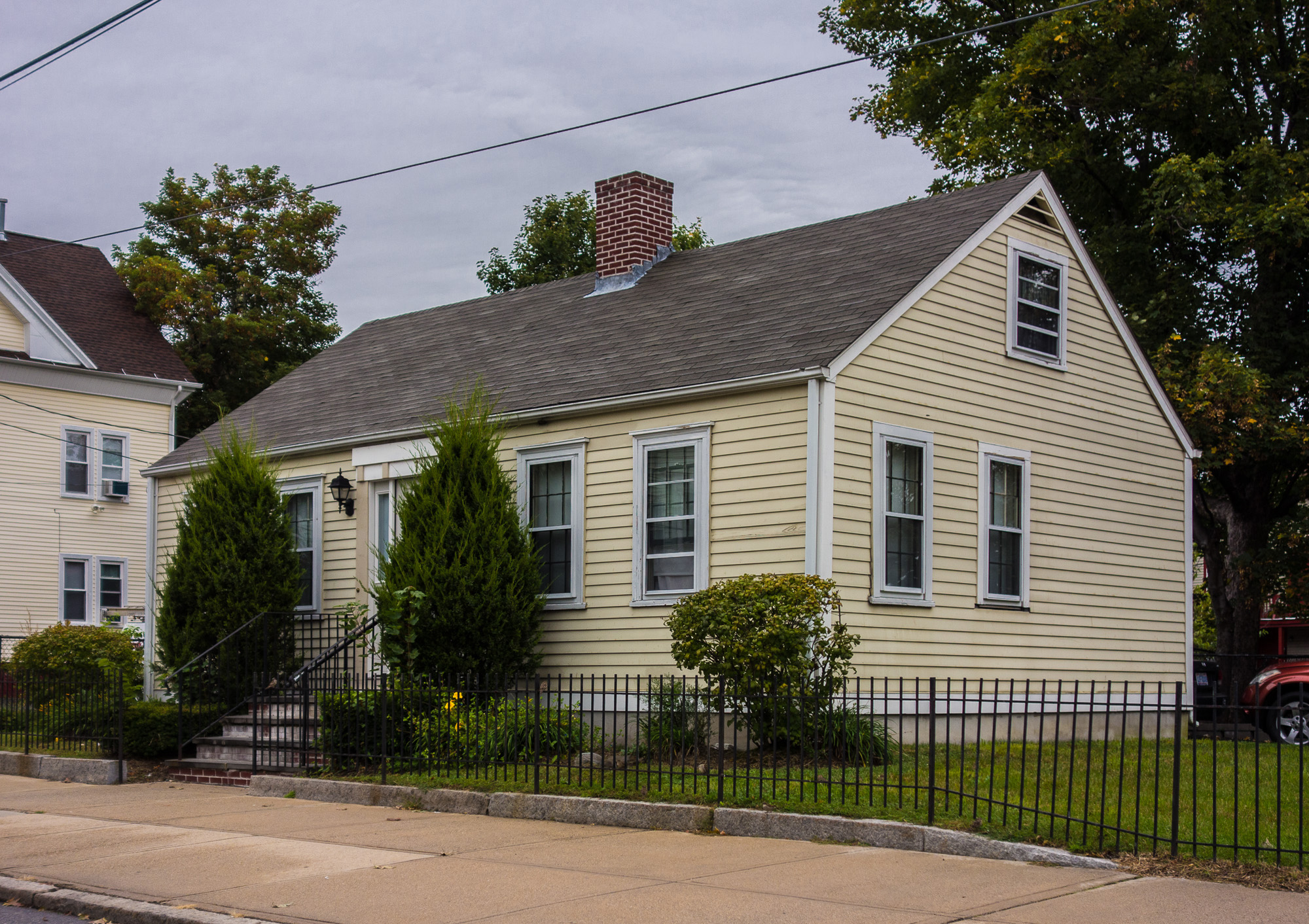
Corner view

== Notes ==
- Original NRHP application includes photo of the house in 1977.

== See also ==
- National Register of Historic Places listings in Providence, Rhode Island
