= The Gray House =

2009 novel by Mariam Petrosyan

- First edition (Russian)
- Author: Mariam Petrosyan
- Audio read by: Scott Merriman
- Original title: Дом, в котором...
- Translator: Yuri Machkasov
- Language: English
- Genre: magic realism
- Published: 2009
- Publisher: AmazonCrossing
- English publication date: April 25, 2017
- Media type: Print (softcover), Kindle book, audiobook
- Pages: 721
- ISBN: 9781503942813

The Gray House (Russian: «Дом, в котором...», literally: The House, In Which...) is the first novel of Armenian writer Mariam Petrosyan. Written in Russian, it tells a story of a boarding school for disabled children and was published in Russian in 2009, becoming a bestseller. The novel was nominated for the Russian Booker Prize in 2010 and received several awards and nominations, among them was the 2009 Russian Prize for the best book in Russian by an author living abroad.

== English version ==
The worldwide English edition of The Gray House came out on 25 April 2017, from AmazonCrossing; it made the shortlist for the 2018 Read Russia Prize.

Excerpts from the novel (in English translation by Andrew Bromfield) were narrated by Stephen Fry in the film Russia's Open Book: Writing in the Age of Putin.

== Translations ==
The book has been also translated into a number of language including (in chronological order):

- Italian as La casa del tempo sospeso (2011)
- Hungarian as Abban a házban (2012)
- Polish as Dom, w którym... (2013)
- Latvian as Nams, kurā (2013)
- Spanish as La casa de los otros (2015)
- French as La Maison dans laquelle (2016)
- Czech as Dům, ve kterém (2016)
- Macedonian as Домот во кој... (2016)
- Bulgarian as Домът, в който... (2018)
- Ukrainian as Будинок, в якому... (2019)

== Reception ==
Phoebe Taplin of The Guardian gave a positive review, writing that the book was "enigmatic and fantastical, comic and postmodern, flawed but brilliant". She compared the book to the works of J.K. Rowling, Salman Rushdie, and Donna Tartt. Kirkus Reviews called the book "An impressive—and impressively massive—feat of imagination."
