= Levins D. Gray House =

- U.S. National Register of Historic Places
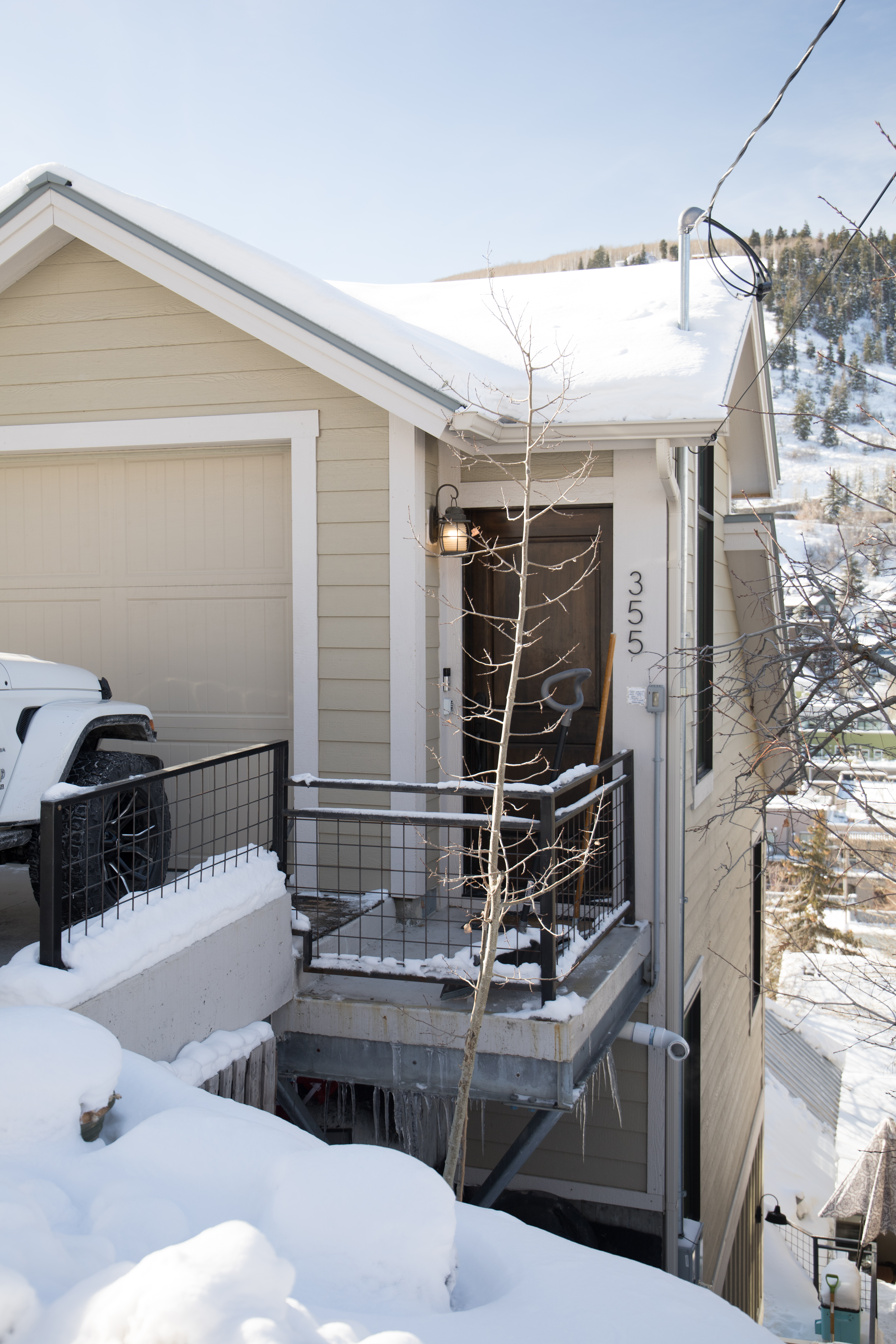

- Location within Utah Location within the United States
- Location: 355 Ontario Ave., Park City, Utah
- Coordinates: 40.643488°N 111.493669°W
- Area: less than one acre
- Built: 1902
- MPS: Mining Boom Era Houses TR
- NRHP reference No.: 84002272
- Added to NRHP: July 12, 1984

The Levins D. Gray House, at 355 Ontario Ave. in Park City, Utah, was built in 1902. It was listed on the National Register of Historic Places in 1984.

It is a single-story frame house with a truncated hip roof. It was deemed, in its Utah State Historical Society document, to be "architecturally significant as one of only five well preserved examples of a variant of the pyramid house. The pyramid house is one of the three most common house types built during the early period of Park City's mining boom era and was built with a number of variations. This one is characterized by the typical square form and a hip roof, but is distinguished from the basic pyramid house in that instead of having a porch spanning the facade, the porch is set into a recessed section of the facade."

The document goes on to say: "Instead of having a porch spanning a symmetrical facade, as was the typical facade arrangement of a pyramid house, the northwest corner was recessed to form a small front porch. The porch spans half of the facade, which consists of a door and a window. It is supported on lathe turned piers which have decorative brackets at the tops, and the balustrade has a geometric design. This type of balustrade was a popular element of the Victorian period, but there are few extant examples of the type in Park City. Because porch elements are the first to deteriorate and be replaced, it is difficult to determine if indeed this type of decoration was common in the area."

The house was built for Levins D. and Stella Gray, who bought the property in October, 1901. It was in an area being rebuilt, after a "great fire of 1898." It is not known if they lived there or rented it out, before they sold it in 1909.
