= Joseph H. Gray House =

Historic house in Nevada, United States

- U.S. National Register of Historic Places
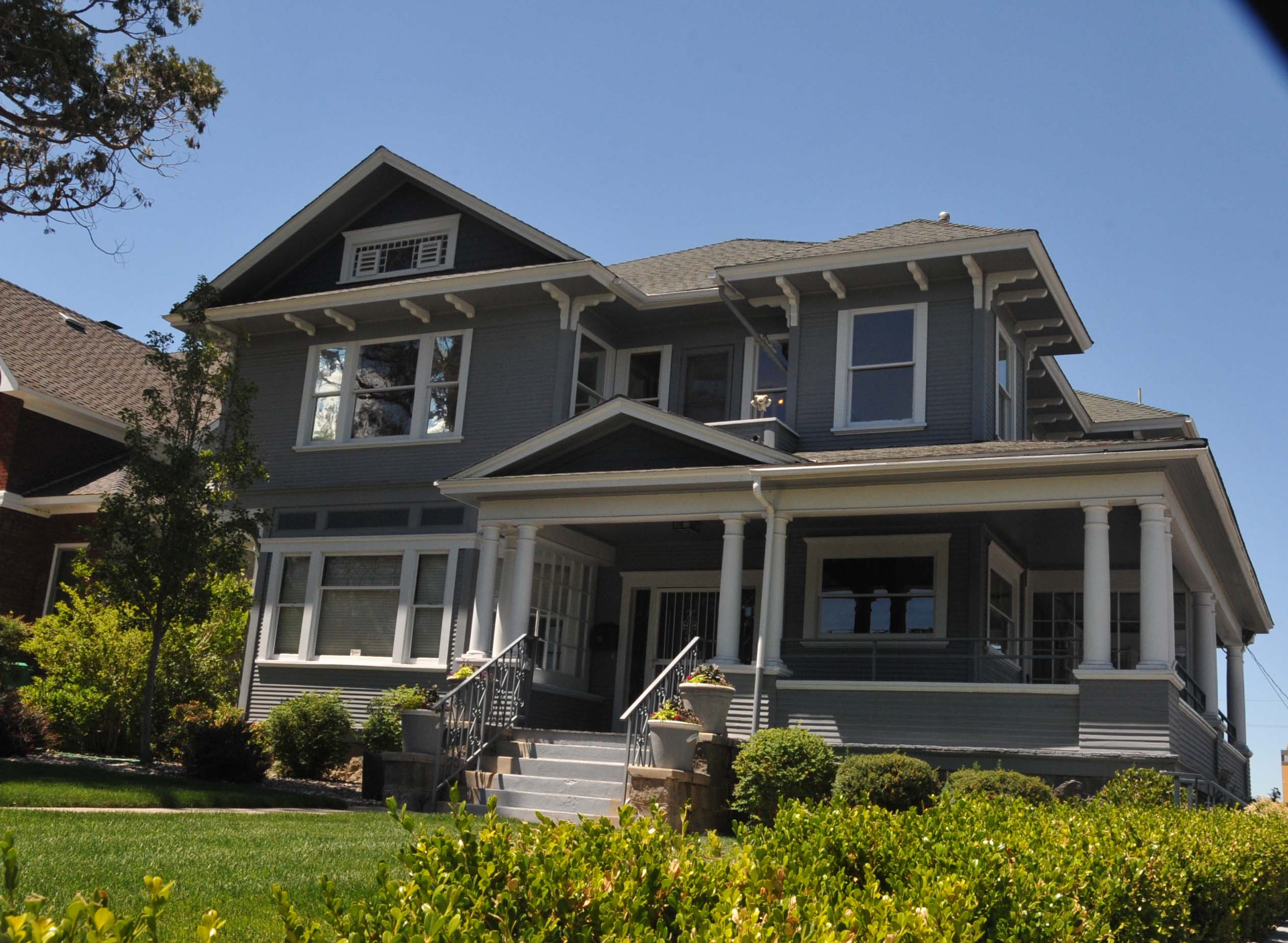

- Location within Nevada Location within the United States
- Location: 457 Court St., Reno, Nevada
- Coordinates: 39°31′22″N 119°49′4″W
- Area: less than one acre
- Built: c.1911
- Architectural style: Colonial Revival, Queen Anne
- NRHP reference No.: 87001472
- Added to NRHP: November 20, 1987

The Joseph H. Gray House, at 457 Court St. in Reno, Nevada, United States, is a historic house that was built in 1911. It includes Colonial Revival details in a form having Queen Anne-style massing. It was listed on the National Register of Historic Places in 1987. The listing included two contributing buildings.

It was built for Reno department store owner Joseph H. Gray.
