= William W. Gray House =

Historic house in Illinois, United States

- U.S. National Register of Historic Places
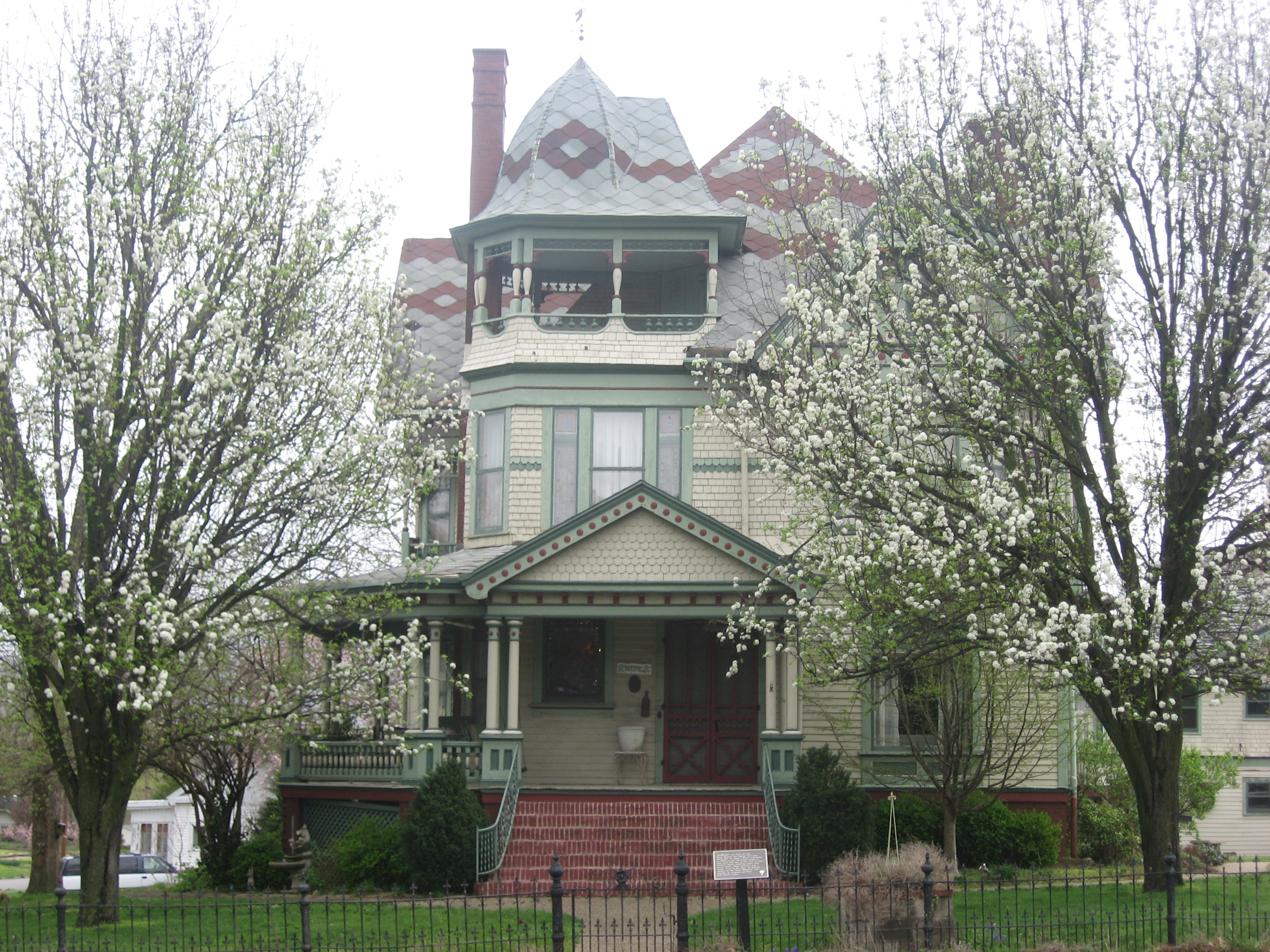

- Location within Illinois Location within the United States
- Location: 119 N. Court St., Grayville, Illinois
- Coordinates: 38°15′31″N 87°59′46″W
- Area: less than one acre
- Architect: Barber, George Franklin
- Architectural style: Queen Anne
- NRHP reference No.: 92000049
- Added to NRHP: February 13, 1992

The William W. Gray House is a historic house located at 119 N. Court St. in Grayville, Illinois. The house was built in 1885 for William W. Gray, Sr., one of the founders of Grayville. George Franklin Barber, a prominent residential architect known for his mail-order house patterns, designed the house in the Queen Anne style. The house's front entrance is located on a wraparound porch supported by Tuscan columns; the entrance is topped by a shingled pediment. The second floor of the house is also sided with wooden shingles and features a balcony on the north site. A porch topped by a tower projects from the third-level attic on the front facade; a bracketed gable is situated on the opposite side of the facade. The steep hip roof is decorated with patterned, multicolored shingles.

The house was added to the National Register of Historic Places on February 13, 1992.
