= Capt. Thomas Gray House =

Historic house in Massachusetts, United States

- U.S. National Register of Historic Places
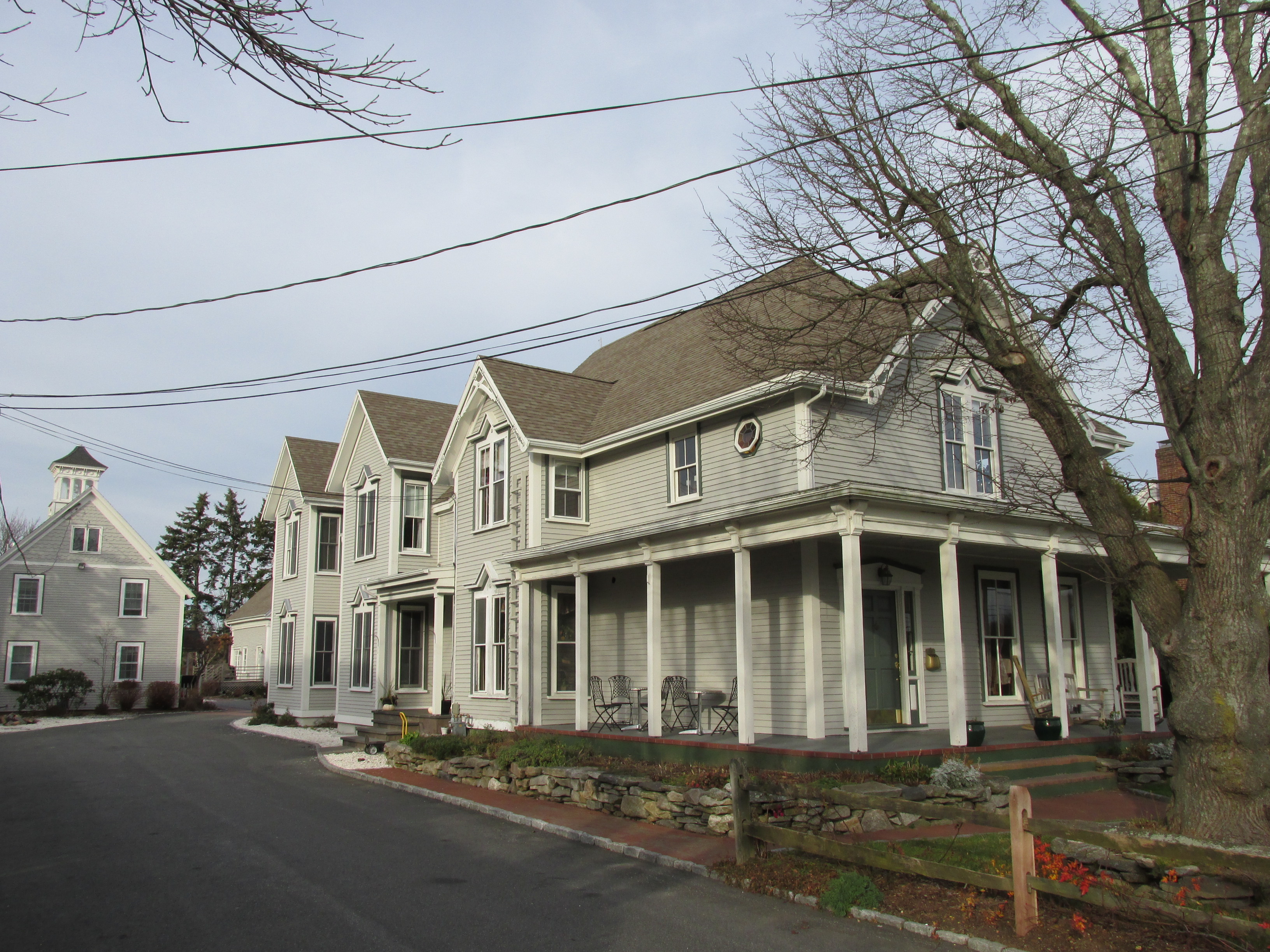
- 14 Main Street

- Location within Cape Cod Location within Massachusetts Location within the United States
- Location: 14 Main Street, Barnstable, Massachusetts
- Coordinates: 41°39′25″N 70°16′20″W
- Built: 1875
- Architectural style: Stick/Eastlake
- MPS: Barnstable MRA
- NRHP reference No.: 87000280
- Added to NRHP: March 13, 1987

The Capt. Thomas Gray House is a historic house in Barnstable, Massachusetts. The 2 1/2-story wood-frame house was built c. 1875, and is a locally rare example of Stick style design. It is T-shaped in plan, with varied gables that have applied stickwork decoration, and its windows have boldly stylized pediments. The property also includes a period barn with cupola. Its owner, Thomas Gray, was a prominent local captain of steamships.

The house was listed on the National Register of Historic Places in 1987.

== See also ==
- National Register of Historic Places listings in Barnstable County, Massachusetts
