= Gray Gables (Winton, North Carolina) =

Historic house in North Carolina, United States

- U.S. National Register of Historic Places
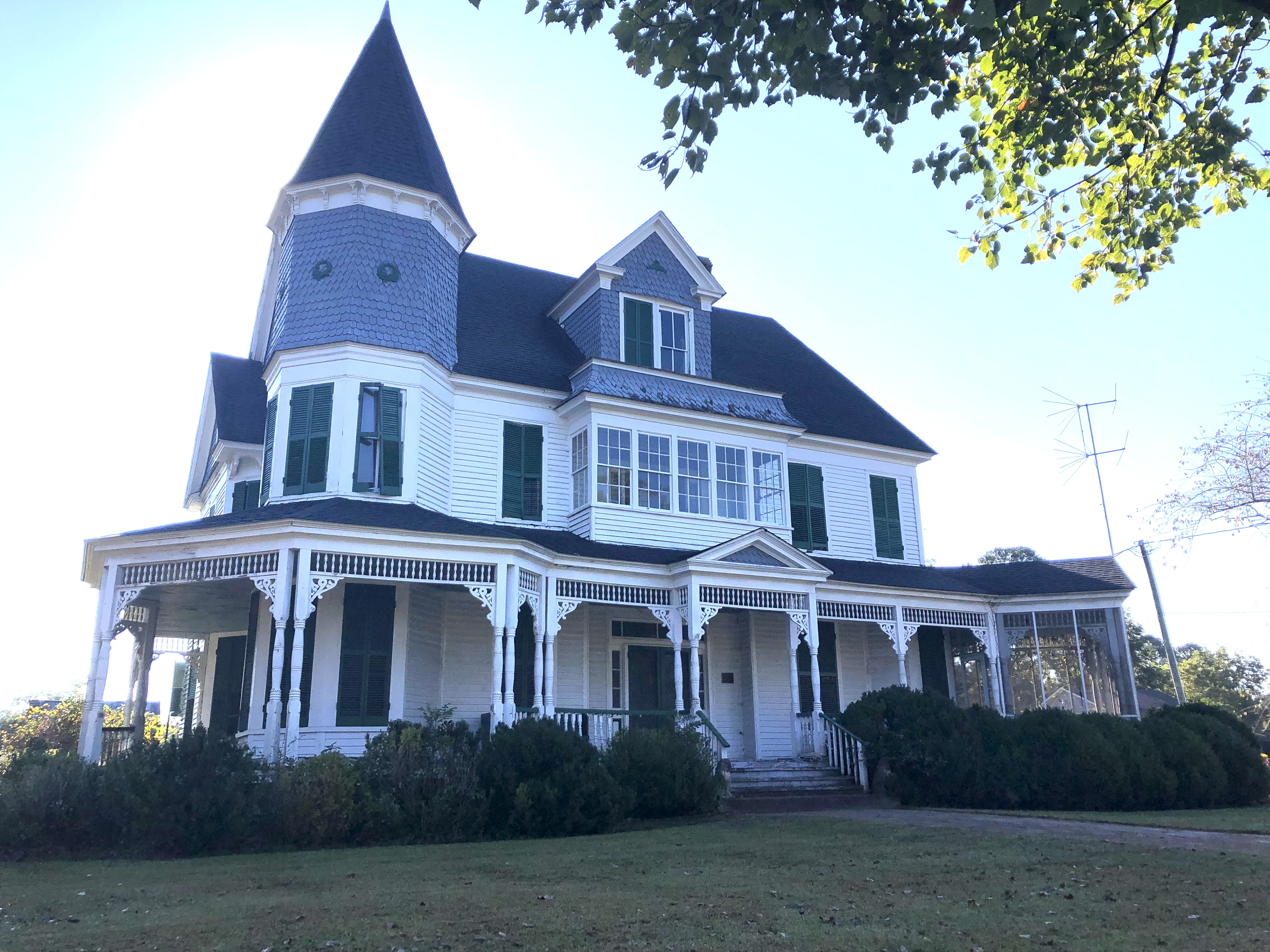

- Location within North Carolina Location within the United States
- Location: Main St., Winton, North Carolina
- Coordinates: 36°23′26″N 76°55′59″W
- Area: less than one acre
- Built: 1899
- Architect: Sloan, Samuel
- Architectural style: Queen Anne
- NRHP reference No.: 82003470
- Added to NRHP: June 1, 1982

Gray Gables, also known as the James S. Mitchell House, is a historic home located at Winton, Hertford County, North Carolina. It was designed by architect Samuel Sloan and built in 1899. It is a three-story, irregularly massed, Queen Anne style frame dwelling. It has a corner tower, a wraparound porch with turned posts and carved brackets, and a steeply pitched gable roof.

It was listed on the National Register of Historic Places in 1982.
