= Gray House (Crosby, Arkansas) =

Historic house in Arkansas, United States

- U.S. National Register of Historic Places
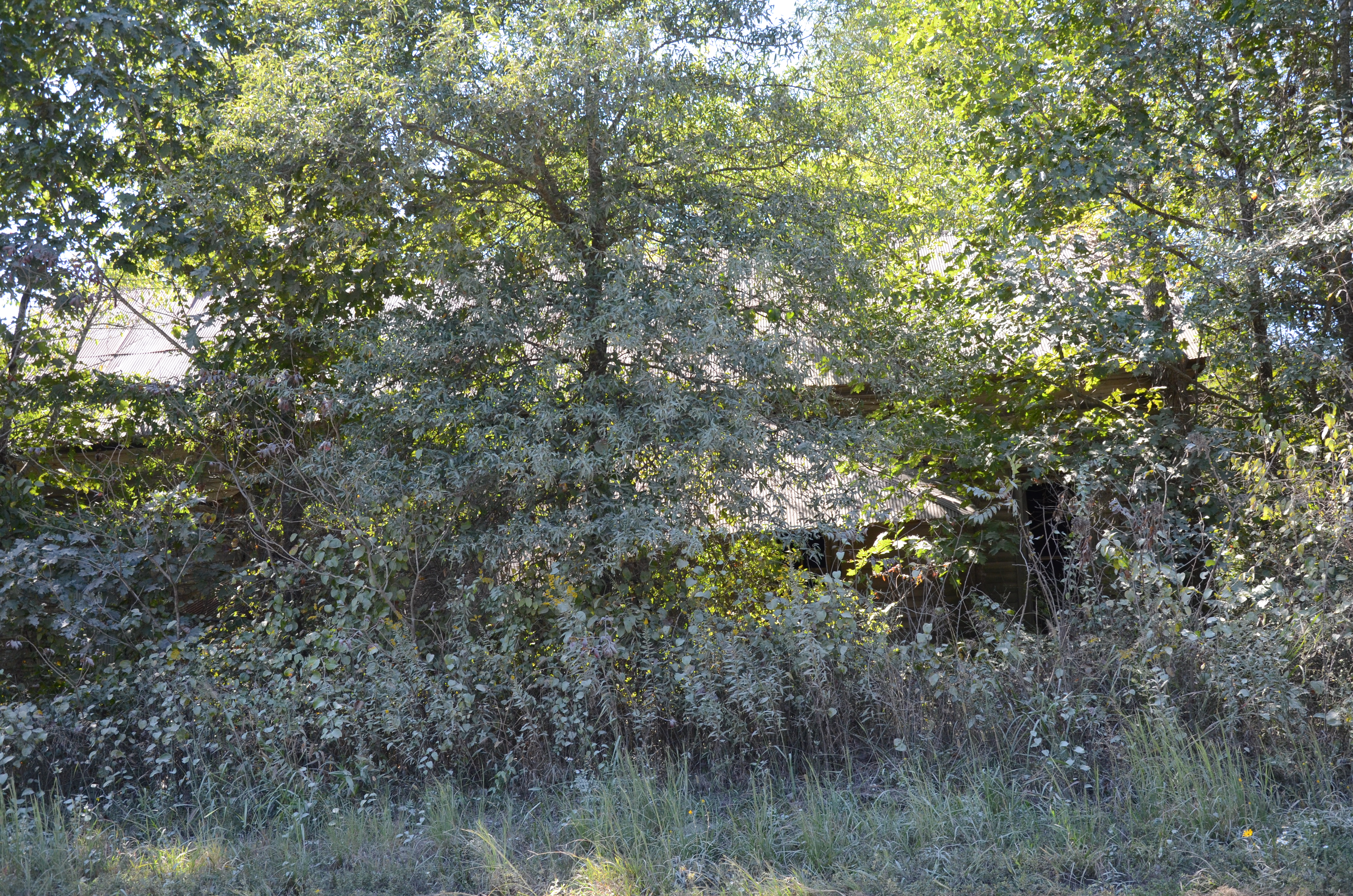
- All that remains of the Gray House

- Location within Arkansas Location within the United States
- Nearest city: Crosby, Arkansas
- Coordinates: 35°18′27″N 91°48′48″W
- Area: less than one acre
- Built: 1875
- Architectural style: Vernacular dog trot
- MPS: White County MPS
- NRHP reference No.: 91001334
- Added to NRHP: July 21, 1992

The Gray House was a historic house in rural White County, Arkansas. It was located north of Crosby and northwest of Searcy, near the junction of County Roads 758 and 46. It was a single-story wood-frame dogtrot house, with a gable roof and an integral rear ell. The east-facing front was a hip-roofed porch extending across its width, supported by square posts. The house was built c. 1875, and was one of the least-altered examples of this form in the county.

The house was listed on the National Register of Historic Places in 1992. It has been listed as destroyed in the Arkansas Historic Preservation Program database.

== See also ==
- National Register of Historic Places listings in White County, Arkansas
