= Winton, North Carolina =

- Town
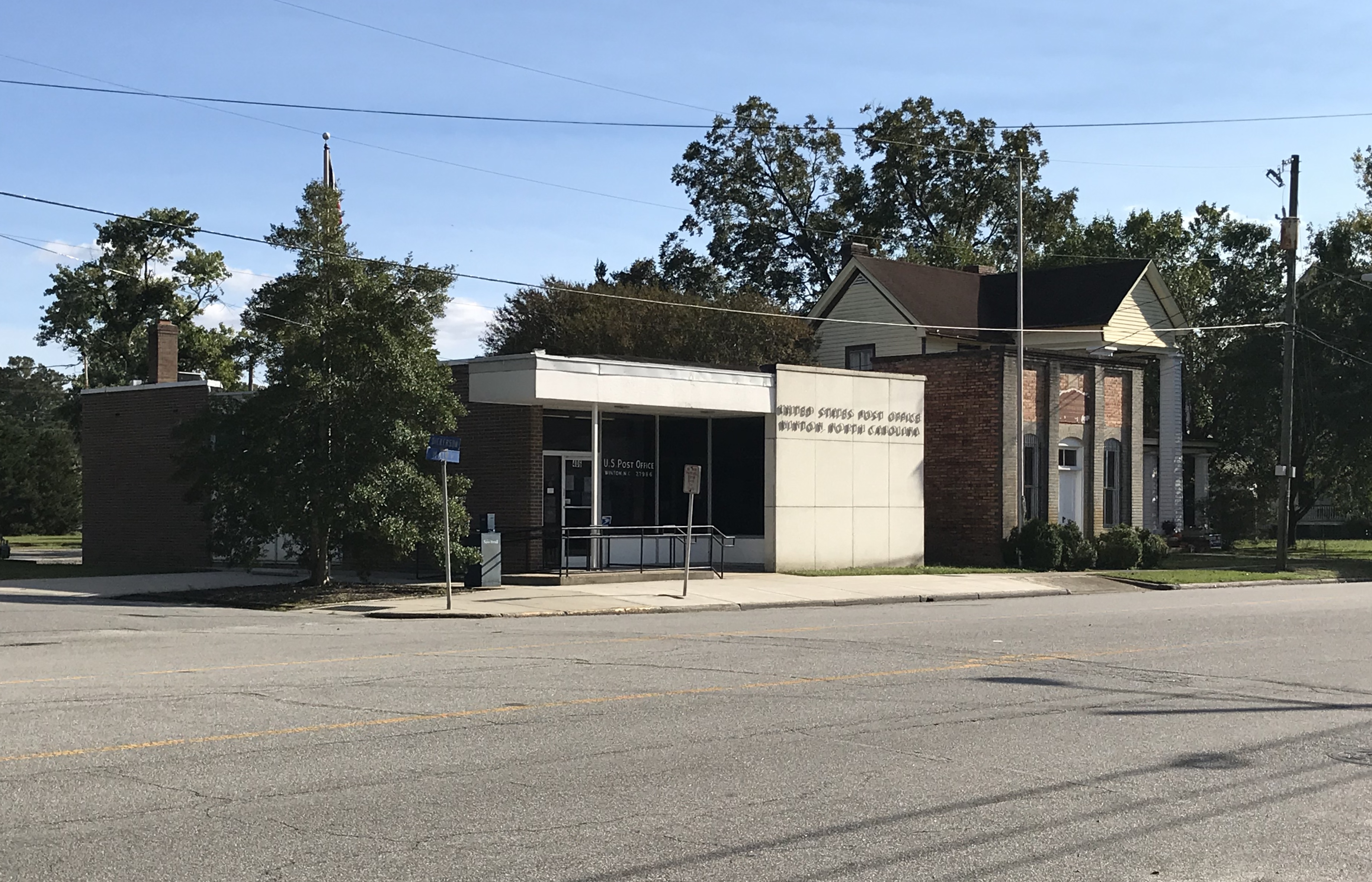
- U.S. Post Office and former U.S. Post Office in Winton

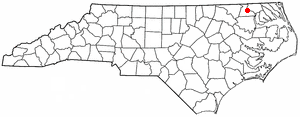
- Location of Winton, North Carolina
- Coordinates: 36°23′24″N 76°56′06″W
- Country: United States
- State: North Carolina
- County: Hertford

Government
  - Mayor: Emily Winstead

Area
  - Total: 0.89 sq mi (2.30 km^{2})
  - Land: 0.84 sq mi (2.18 km^{2})
  - Water: 0.046 sq mi (0.12 km^{2})
- Elevation: 43 ft (13 m)

Population (2020)
  - Total: 629
  - Density: 747.7/sq mi (288.68/km^{2})
- Time zone: UTC-5 (Eastern (EST))
  - Summer (DST): UTC-4 (EDT)
- ZIP code: 27986
- Area code: 252
- FIPS code: 37-75080
- GNIS feature ID: 2406906

Winton is a town in and the county seat of Hertford County, North Carolina, United States. It is governed by the Town Council which consists of a Mayor and five Council members. As of the 2020 census, Winton had a population of 629.

== History ==
The area eventually comprising the town of Winton was proximate to a community of Meherrin people. The area was first named Cotton's Ferry in homage to Alexander Cotton, a settler who operated a ferry in the 1740s. Hertford County was formed effective 1760. The county's first session of court was held at Cotton's Ferry. Benjamin Wynns, who had since acquired Cotton's property, donated 150 acres to the county for the creation of a town in the mid-1760s. In 1766 the town of Winton—originally styled Wynnton after the erstwhile landowner—was established as Hertford's seat of government and a courthouse was subsequently constructed. The original spelling of the name was used into the 1800s. The town's economy in its early years relied primarily upon agriculture. In 1830 the original courthouse was burned.

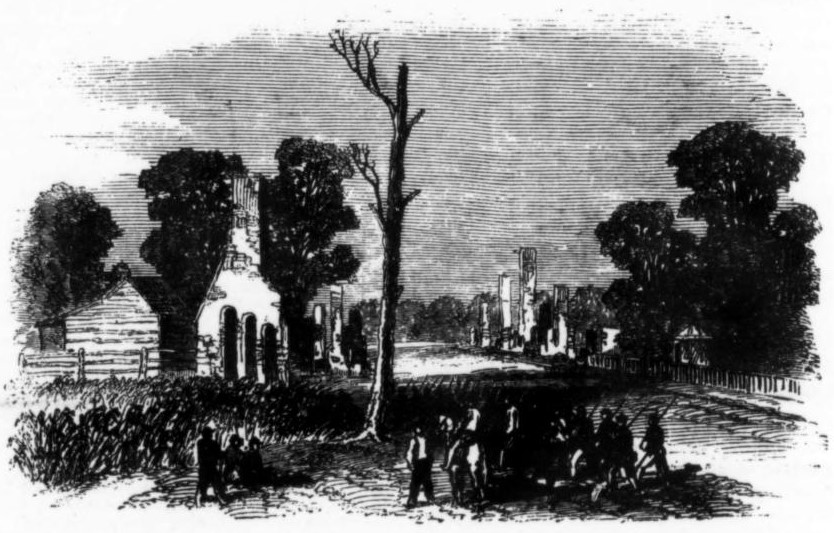
Ruins of Winton c. 1863

During the American Civil War, North Carolina seceded from the United States and joined the Confederate States of America. Federal forces intervened in eastern North Carolina early in the conflict, and in February 1862 they captured Roanoke Island, exposing territory along the Chowan River vulnerable to further penetration. Federal gunboats were subsequently dispatched up the river to destroy rail bridges north of Winton but were repulsed in an ambush by Confederate artillery. The following day federal troops under Colonel Rush C. Hawkins landed at Winton and found it deserted. Angered by the ambush and determined to deny Confederate troops the use of facilities, Hawkins ordered his troops to burn most of the buildings in town. As a result, the vast majority of structures in the town were destroyed, including the county courthouse.

After the war the town slowly rebuilt, with a new courthouse erected in 1870. The area economy continued to be based in agriculture, though the local lumber and fishing industries grew in importance in the latter portion of the 19th century. The town's economy and population continued to grow in the following years. In 1924, Winton was connected south to Ahoskie by the Winton-Ahoskie Highway, and a steel highway bridge was built across the Chowan River at Winton in 1925, the first in the county to cross the river. While the town's bank failed during the Great Depression, the local lumber, fishing, and shipping industries continued to be of importance into the 1950s. Also in the 1950s, the county government invested in the construction of new facilities, including the erection of a new courthouse in 1956.

The agricultural economy which underpinned the Winton region began to consolidate in the mid-20th century. In 1974, a bypass for U.S. Highway 13 was built diverting traffic around the community, leading to sharp decline in business in the town's center. Overfishing and pollution led to the sharp decline of the fishing industry in the 1990s.

The earliest buildings in the Winton Historic District reflect the Italianate, Queen Anne, and Gothic Revival styles of the mid-to-late nineteenth century. The C. S. Brown School Auditorium, Gray Gables, and King Parker House are listed on the National Register of Historic Places.

== Geography ==
According to the United States Census Bureau, the town has a total area of 0.8 square miles (2.1 km^{2}), all land.

== Demographics ==
Historical population
Census	Pop.	Note	%±
1880	253		—
1890	419		65.6%
1900	688		64.2%
1910	624		−9.3%
1920	489		−21.6%
1930	582		19.0%
1940	733		25.9%
1950	834		13.8%
1960	835		0.1%
1970	917		9.8%
1980	825		−10.0%
1990	796		−3.5%
2000	956		20.1%
2010	769		−19.6%
2020	629		−18.2%
U.S. Decennial Census

=== Racial and ethnic composition ===
Winton town, North Carolina – Racial and ethnic composition Note: the US Census treats Hispanic/Latino as an ethnic category. This table excludes Latinos from the racial categories and assigns them to a separate category. Hispanics/Latinos may be of any race.
Race / Ethnicity (NH = Non-Hispanic)	Pop 2000	Pop 2010	Pop 2020	% 2000	% 2010	% 2020
White alone (NH)	263	197	179	27.51%	25.62%	28.46%
Black or African American alone (NH)	643	536	378	67.26%	69.70%	60.10%
Native American or Alaska Native alone (NH)	23	18	20	2.41%	2.34%	3.18%
Asian alone (NH)	6	0	0	0.63%	0.00%	0.00%
Native Hawaiian or Pacific Islander alone (NH)	0	0	1	0.00%	0.00%	0.16%
Other race alone (NH)	0	0	9	0.00%	0.00%	1.43%
Mixed race or Multiracial (NH)	4	9	13	0.42%	1.17%	2.07%
Hispanic or Latino (any race)	17	9	29	1.78%	1.17%	4.61%
Total	956	769	629	100.00%	100.00%	100.00%

=== 2020 census ===
As of the 2020 United States census, there were 629 people, 291 households, and 192 families residing in the town.

=== 2000 census ===
As of the census of 2000, there were 956 people, 373 households, and 252 families residing in the town. The population density was 1,180.6 inhabitants per square mile (455.8/km^{2}). There were 385 housing units at an average density of 475.4 per square mile (183.6/km^{2}). The racial makeup of the town was 67.99% African American, 27.62% White, 2.41% Native American, 0.84% from other races, 0.63% Asian, and 0.52% from two or more races. Hispanic or Latino of any race were 1.78% of the population.

There were 373 households, out of which 31.4% had children under the age of 18 living with them, 34.9% were married couples living together, 29.2% had a female householder with no husband present, and 32.2% were non-families. 28.7% of all households were made up of individuals, and 11.5% had someone living alone who was 65 years of age or older. The average household size was 2.37 and the average family size was 2.91.

In the town, the population was spread out, with 25.8% under the age of 18, 10.7% from 18 to 24, 26.7% from 25 to 44, 25.9% from 45 to 64, and 10.9% who were 65 years of age or older. The median age was 35 years. For every 100 females, there were 87.8 males. For every 100 females age 18 and over, there were 85.1 males.

The median income for a household in the town was $19,706, and the median income for a family was $21,838. Males had a median income of $21,875 compared to $17,059 for females. The per capita income for the town was $13,049. About 19.3% of families and 20.0% of the population were below the poverty line, including 23.7% of those under age 18 and 7.1% of those age 65 or over.

Winton and the surrounding area is the home of the Meherrin Indian Tribe. This state-recognized tribe has more than 900 members.

== Government and infrastructure ==
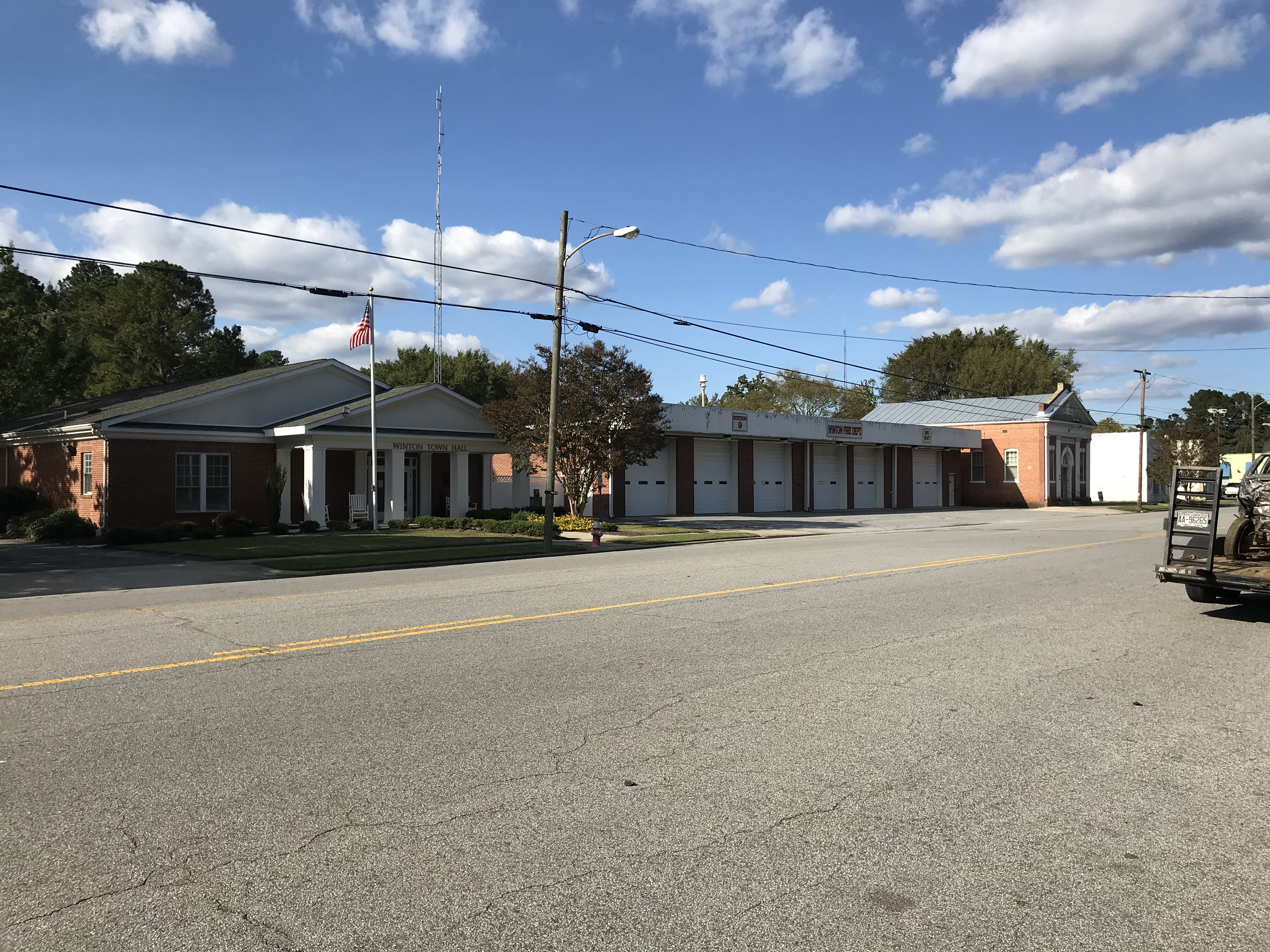
Town hall

Rivers Correctional Institution, a private prison operated by the GEO Group which operates under contract from the Federal Bureau of Prisons and houses many felons who committed crimes in Washington, DC, is 1 mile (1.6 km) from Winton.

== Education ==
The Hertford County Public Schools system serves students in the area, many of whom attend Hertford County High School in Ahoskie. C. S. Brown High School STEM, and The Alternative Learning Program are located in Winton.

== Notable person ==
- Sherman Jones, MLB player and member of Kansas House of Representatives

== Works cited ==
- Corbitt, David Leroy (2000). The formation of the North Carolina counties, 1663-1943 (reprint ed.). Raleigh: North Carolina Division of Archives and History. OCLC 46398241.
- Grimsley, Mark (1995). The Hard Hand of War: Union Military Policy Toward Southern Civilians, 1861-1865 (revised ed.). Cambridge University Press. ISBN 9780521599412.
- Harrell, Roger H. (2011). The 2nd North Carolina Cavalry (reprint ed.). Jefferson, North Carolina: McFarland. ISBN 9780786467747.
- Powell, William S. (1976). The North Carolina Gazetteer: A Dictionary of Tar Heel Places. Chapel Hill: The University of North Carolina Press. ISBN 9780807812471.
