= John Gray House (Port Matilda, Pennsylvania) =

Historic house in Pennsylvania, United States

- U.S. National Register of Historic Places
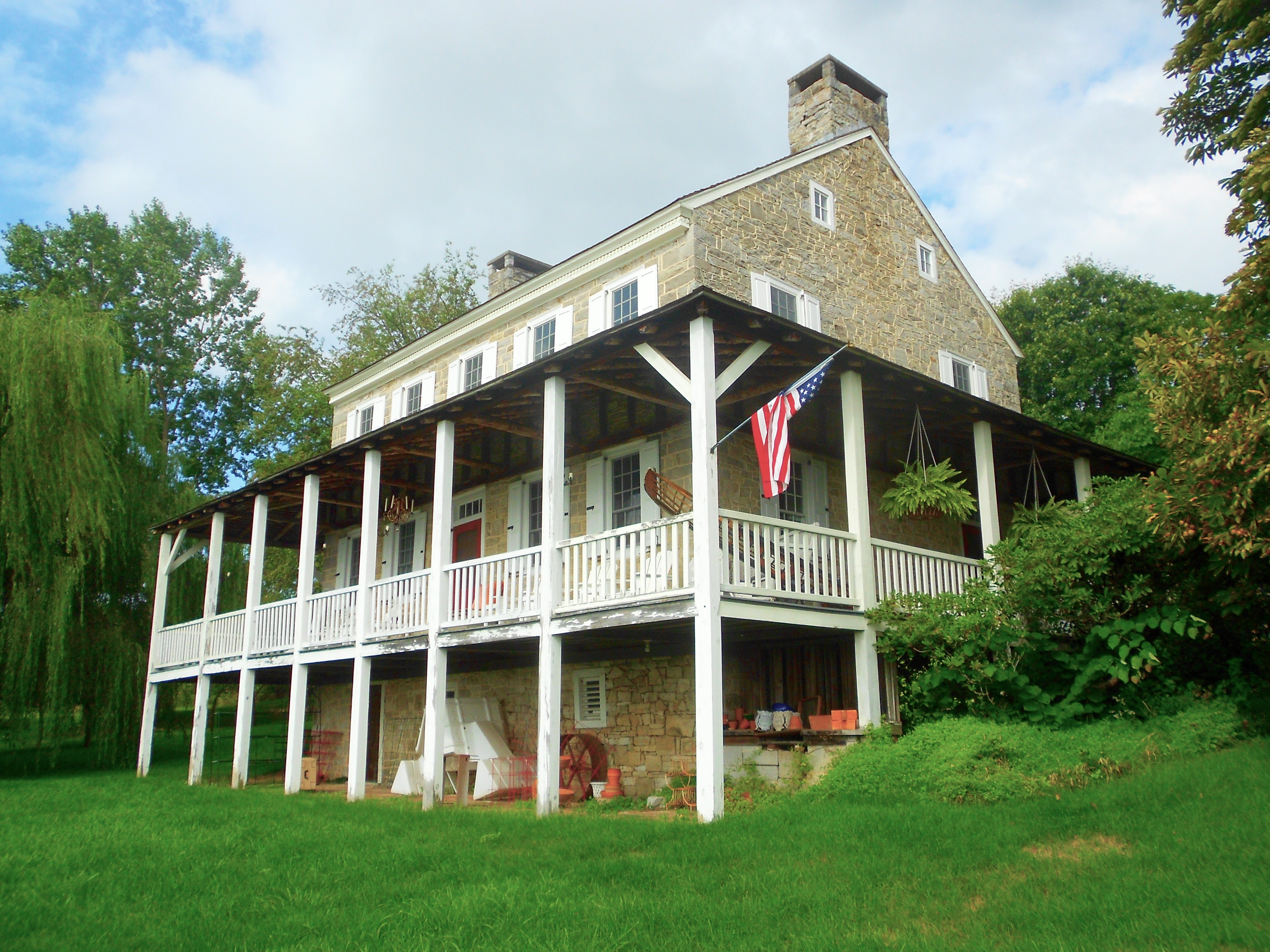

- Location within Pennsylvania Location within the United States
- Location: East of Port Matilda off Pennsylvania Route 550, south of U.S. Route 220, Port Matilda, Patton Township, Pennsylvania
- Coordinates: 40°49′28″N 77°58′29″W
- Area: 6 acres (2.4 ha)
- Built: 1793
- Architectural style: Georgian
- NRHP reference No.: 75001628
- Added to NRHP: April 3, 1975

John Gray House is a historic home located at Port Matilda, Patton Township, Centre County, Pennsylvania. It was built in 1793, and is a 2 1/2-story, five-bay, stone dwelling with an exposed basement. The interior has a traditional Georgian center hall plan.

It was added to the National Register of Historic Places in 1975.

== Gallery ==
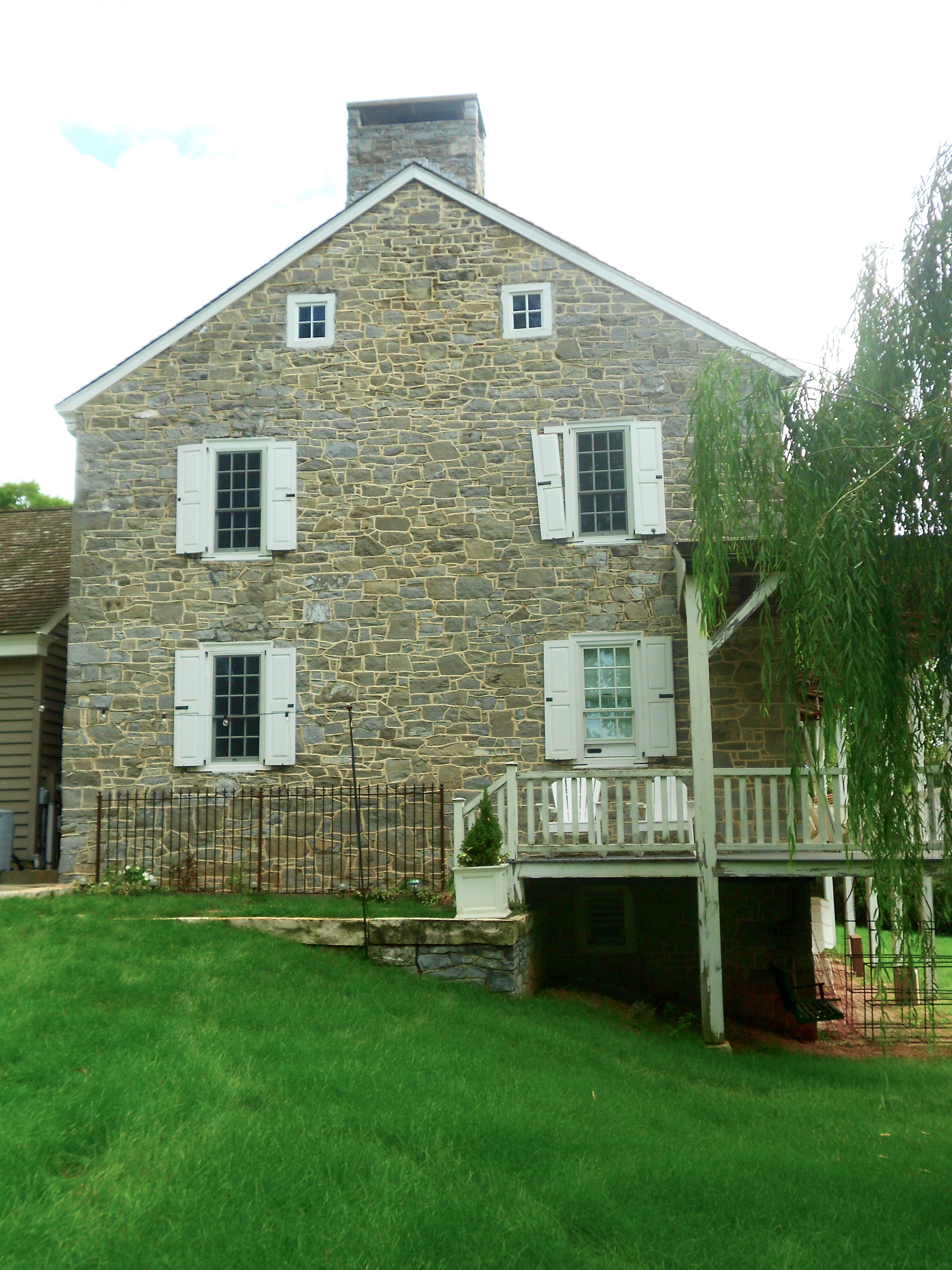
Gable end

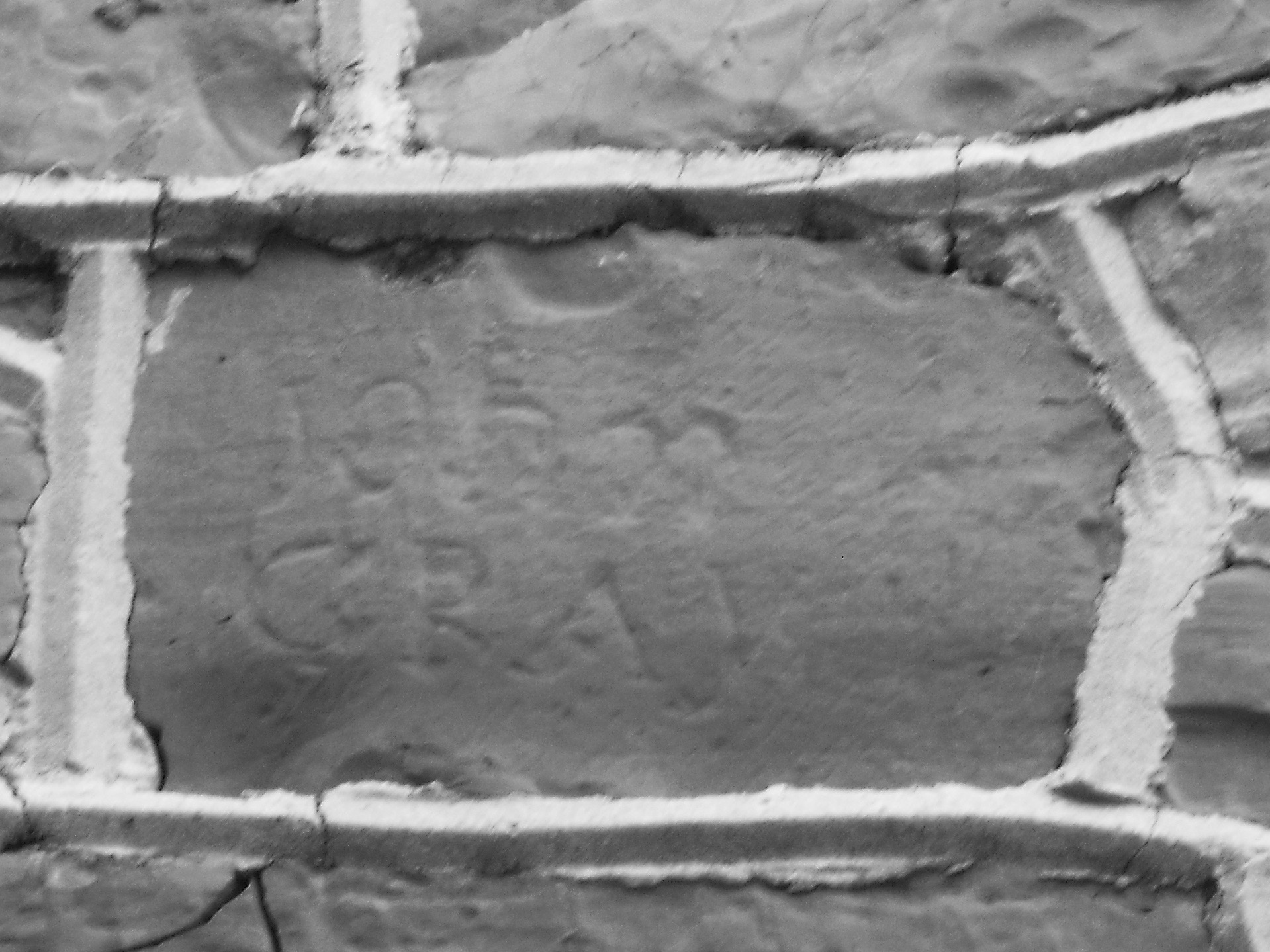
Datestone reading "Gray" with year illegible
