= Sprague–Marshall–Bowie House =

Historic building in Portland, Oregon, U.S.

- Sprague-Marshall-Bowie House
- U.S. National Register of Historic Places
- U.S. Historic district – Contributing property
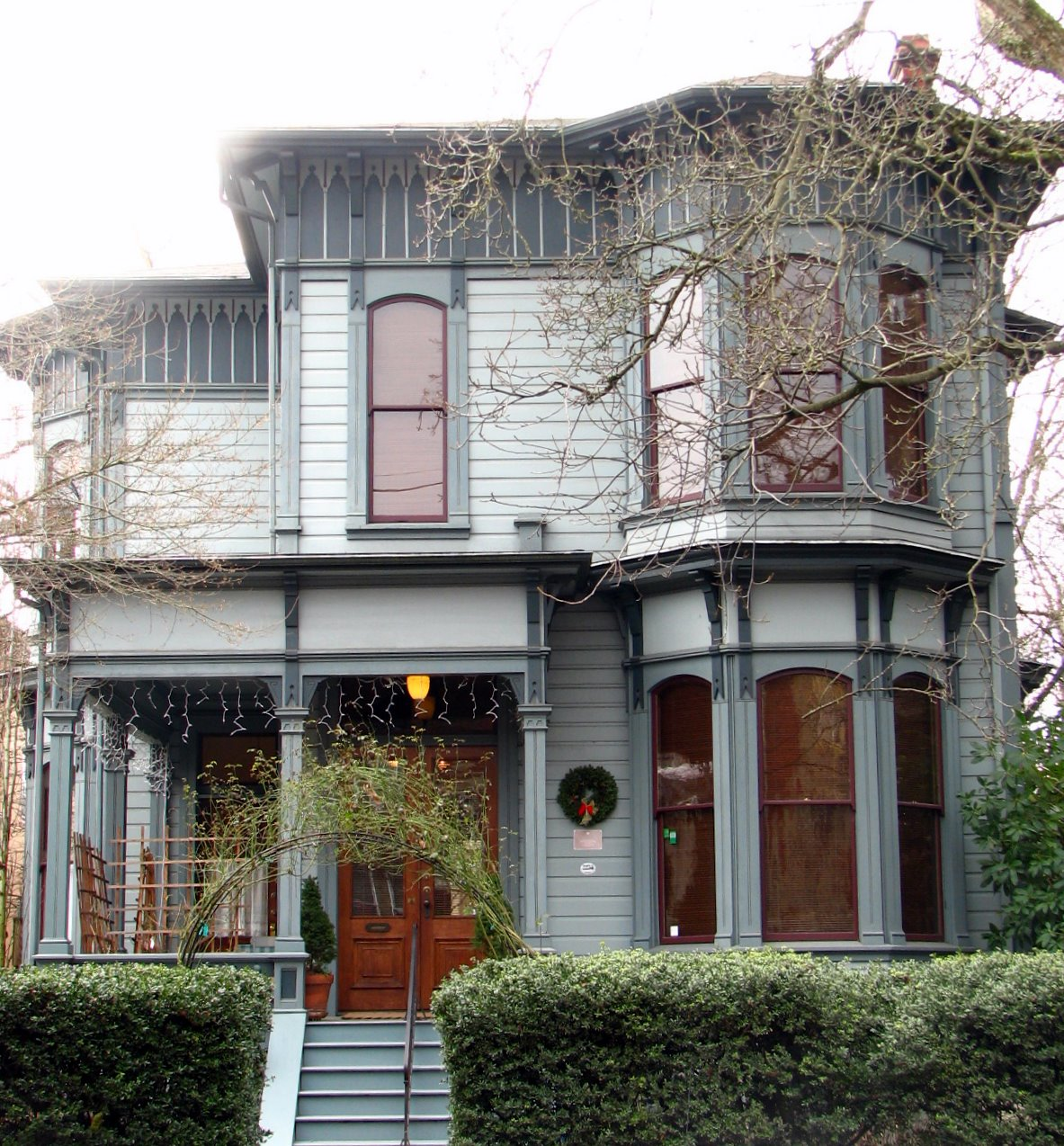

- Location within Oregon Location within the United States
- Location: 2234 NW Johnson Street; Portland, Oregon
- Coordinates: 45°31′41″N 122°41′51″W
- Area: 0.1 acres (0.040 ha)
- Built: 1882
- Architectural style: Italianate
- Part of: Alphabet Historic District (ID00001293)
- NRHP reference No.: 80003375
- Added to NRHP: February 5, 1980

The Sprague–Marshall–Bowie House, also known as the G.T. Gray House, is a historic Italianate style house in Portland, Oregon, that was built in 1882. It was listed on the National Register of Historic Places in 1980.
