= Rocky Mount =

Rocky Mount may refer to:

- Rocky Mount, Alabama, a place in Chilton County, Alabama
- Rocky Mount, Georgia
- Rocky Mount, Louisiana
- Rocky Mount, Miller County, Missouri
- Rocky Mount, Morgan County, Missouri
- Rocky Mount, North Carolina
  - Rocky Mount station
  - Rocky Mount Sports Complex
  - Rocky Mount High School
  - Rocky Mount Instruments
  - Rocky Mount metropolitan area
  - Rocky Mount Mills
  - Rocky Mount–Wilson Regional Airport
- Rocky Mount State Historic Site, Piney Flats, Tennessee
- Rocky Mount, Virginia
- USS Rocky Mount

== Events ==
- Rocky Mount Fire of 2016, a forest fire in Shenandoah National Park
