= Imperial Centre for the Arts and Sciences =

Museum in Rocky Mount, North Carolina, US

Imperial Centre for the Arts & Sciences

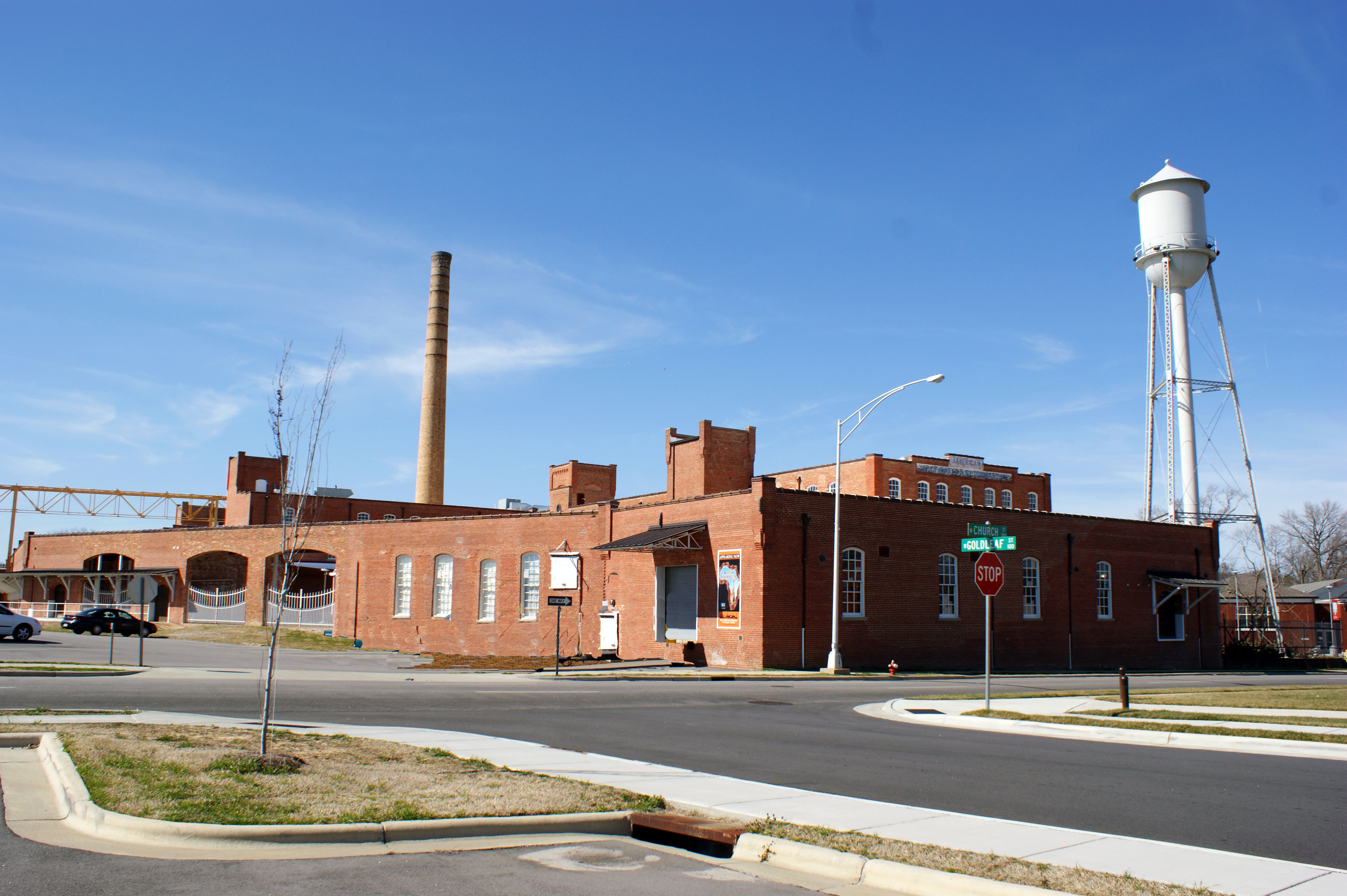
- Established: 2005
- Location: 270 Gay St, Rocky Mount, North Carolina, United States
- Coordinates: 35°56′49.1″N 77°47′55.0″W
- Website: imperialcentre.org

The Imperial Centre for the Arts and Sciences is an art and science museum in Rocky Mount, North Carolina that includes the Maria V. Howard Arts Center, Rocky Mount Children's Museum and Science Center, Cummins Planetarium (currently closed), and a community theater. Currently the museum hosts science and art exhibitions, theater performances, art classes and workshops, as well as community events.

The facility is located on a 135,000 sf site within the former facilities of the Imperial Tobacco Company, of Great Britain and Ireland, The company had been a leader in the N.C. tobacco industry from the late 19th century, for about 65 years.

The tobacco company's 180-foot overhead steel conveyor, 80-foot water tower, and 90-foot brick chimney all remain, and are incorporated in the museum's logo.

== Background ==
The museum site combines the former sites of the city's former Braswell Memorial Library and the Imperial Tobacco Company. While Imperial Tobacco constructed numerous facilities, from 1903 to 1923, from warehouses to curing furnaces, the building that is now the Imperial Centre itself, formerly known as the McDonald Building, housed the company's ordering operations as well as its hand and machine stemming work, where the central vein or stem of harvested tobacco leaves were removed. The company had ended all its operations by the 1980s.

When Hurricane Floyd inundated Rocky Mount in September 1999, many of the city's cultural facilities were destroyed, including its downtown Children's Museum and Arts Center as well as the Playhouse community theater in the Nashville Road area. Rocky Mount chose to recreate a new facility at the Imperial Tobacco site.
