= West Haven Historic District =

Historic district in North Carolina, United States

- U.S. National Register of Historic Places
- U.S. Historic district
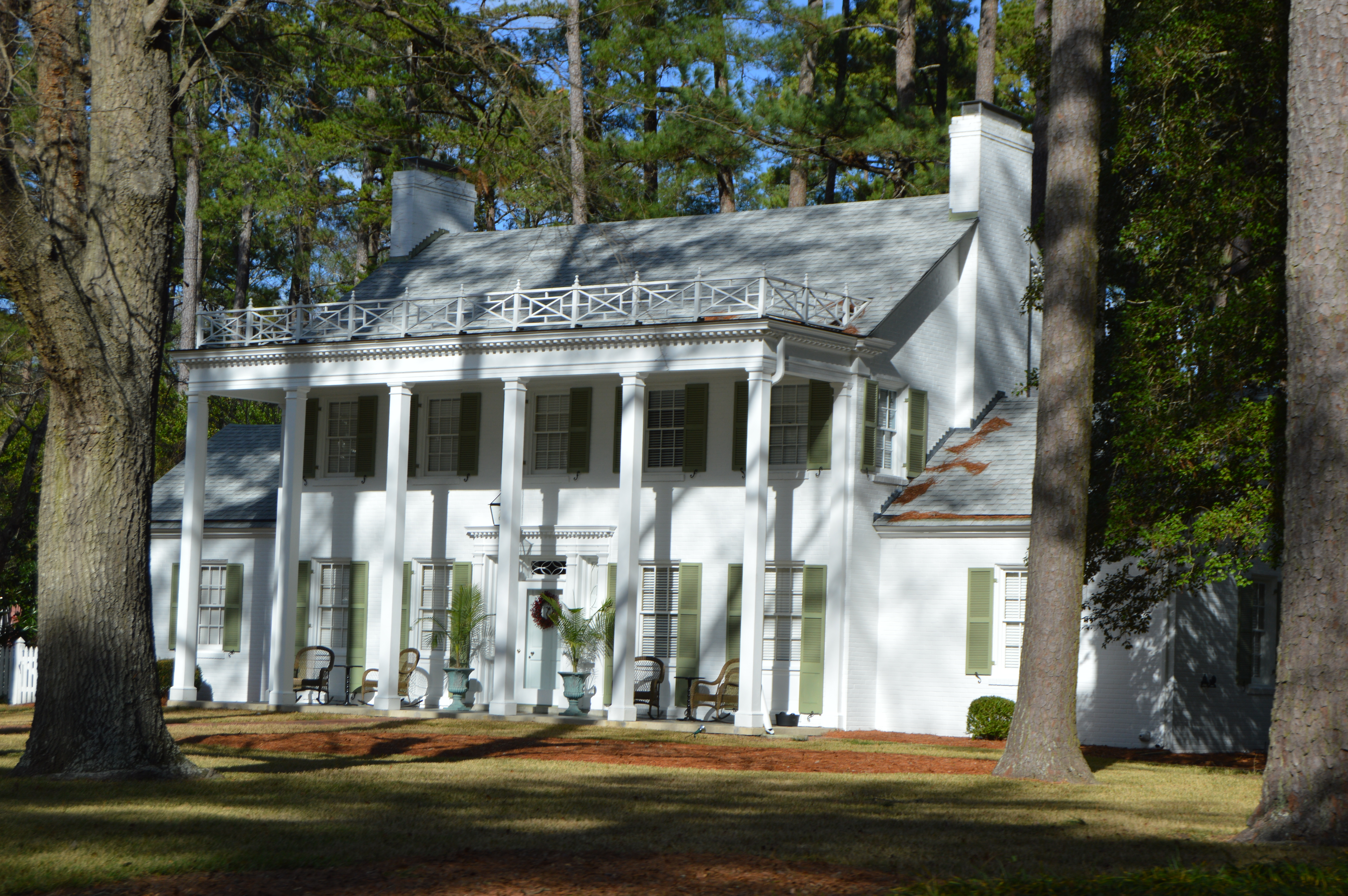
- House in the 1500 block of West Haven Boulevard

- Location within North Carolina Location within the United States
- Location: Roughly bounded by Lafayette and Pinecrest Aves., and the Tar River, Rocky Mount, North Carolina
- Coordinates: 35°56′41″N 77°49′19″W
- Area: 211 acres (85 ha)
- Built: 1928
- Architect: Herman, Thomas; Harles, Harry
- Architectural style: Colonial Revival, Tudor Revival, et al.
- NRHP reference No.: 02000931
- Added to NRHP: September 6, 2002

West Haven Historic District is a national historic district located at Rocky Mount, Nash County, North Carolina. It encompasses 181 contributing buildings and 2 contributing sites in a residential section of Rocky Mount. The buildings primarily date between about 1928 and 1952, and include notable examples of Renaissance Revival, Tudor Revival, Colonial Revival, and Classical Revival style residential architecture. Notable buildings include the Robert D. Gorham residence (1928), H. Alex Easley House (1934), Leon Epstein house (1928), and Thomas Pearsall House (1933).

It was listed on the National Register of Historic Places in 2002.
