= Rocky Mount Mills Village Historic District =

Historic district in North Carolina, United States

- U.S. National Register of Historic Places
- U.S. Historic district
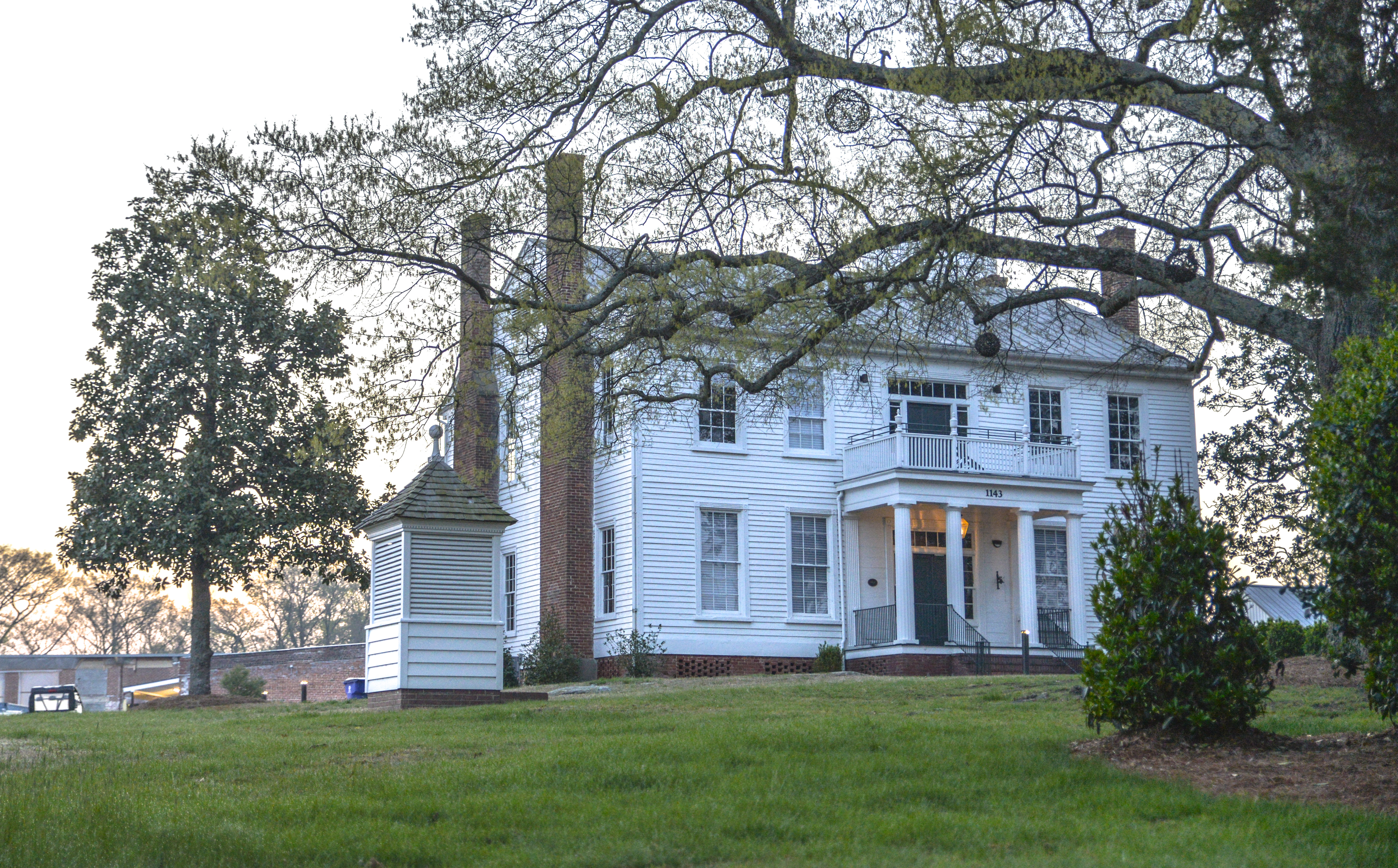
- Battle House located in the Historic District

- Location within North Carolina Location within the United States
- Location: Bounded by Tar R., Columbia Ave., Spring St., and Carr St., Rocky Mount, North Carolina
- Coordinates: 35°57′26″N 77°48′15″W
- Area: 48 acres (19 ha)
- Built: 1835
- Architectural style: Greek Revival, Bungalow/craftsman, et al.
- NRHP reference No.: 99000479
- Added to NRHP: April 22, 1999

Rocky Mount Mills Village Historic District is a national historic district located at Rocky Mount, Nash County, North Carolina. It encompasses 101 contributing buildings and 2 contributing structures in a historic mill village located at Rocky Mount. The buildings primarily date between about 1835 and 1948, and include notable examples of Greek Revival and Bungalow / American Craftsman style residential architecture. The district includes the buildings previously listed as Rocky Mount Mills and includes the Colonel Benjamin D. Battle House (1835). Other notable buildings include the mill village community house (1918) and a variety of one- and two-story frame mill worker houses.

It was listed on the National Register of Historic Places in 1999.
