= Rocky Mount Event Center =

Event venue

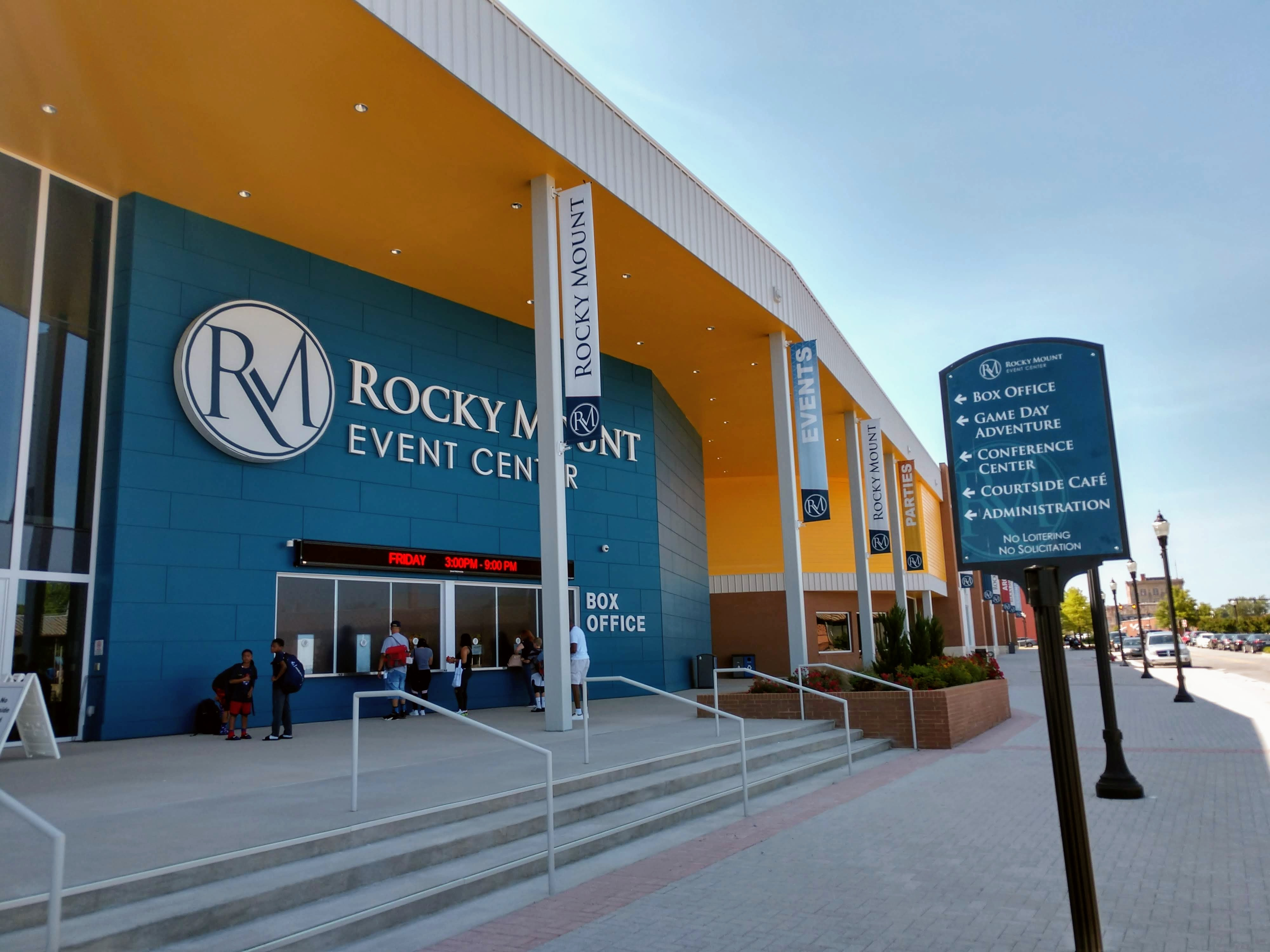
- Interactive map of Rocky Mount Event Center
- Location: 285 NE Main St, Rocky Mount, Rocky Mount, North Carolina 27801
- Coordinates: 35.9452°N 77.7933°W
- Capacity: 5,000

Construction
- Opened: 2018

Website
- rockymountevents.com

Rocky Mount Event Center (RMEC) is a 165,000-square-foot, $48-million multipurpose facility for entertainment and athletic events in Rocky Mount, North Carolina that opened in 2018. Its athletic space includes eight basketball courts, sixteen volleyball courts, climbing walls, and a ropes course. It also has a family entertainment center, meeting rooms, banquet space, and concession areas. It holds local, regional and national sporting tournaments as well as concerts, entertainment events, corporate conferences, and trade shows. President Donald Trump held his last rally of 2025 here on December 19, 2025.
