= John Nichols (politician) =

American politician

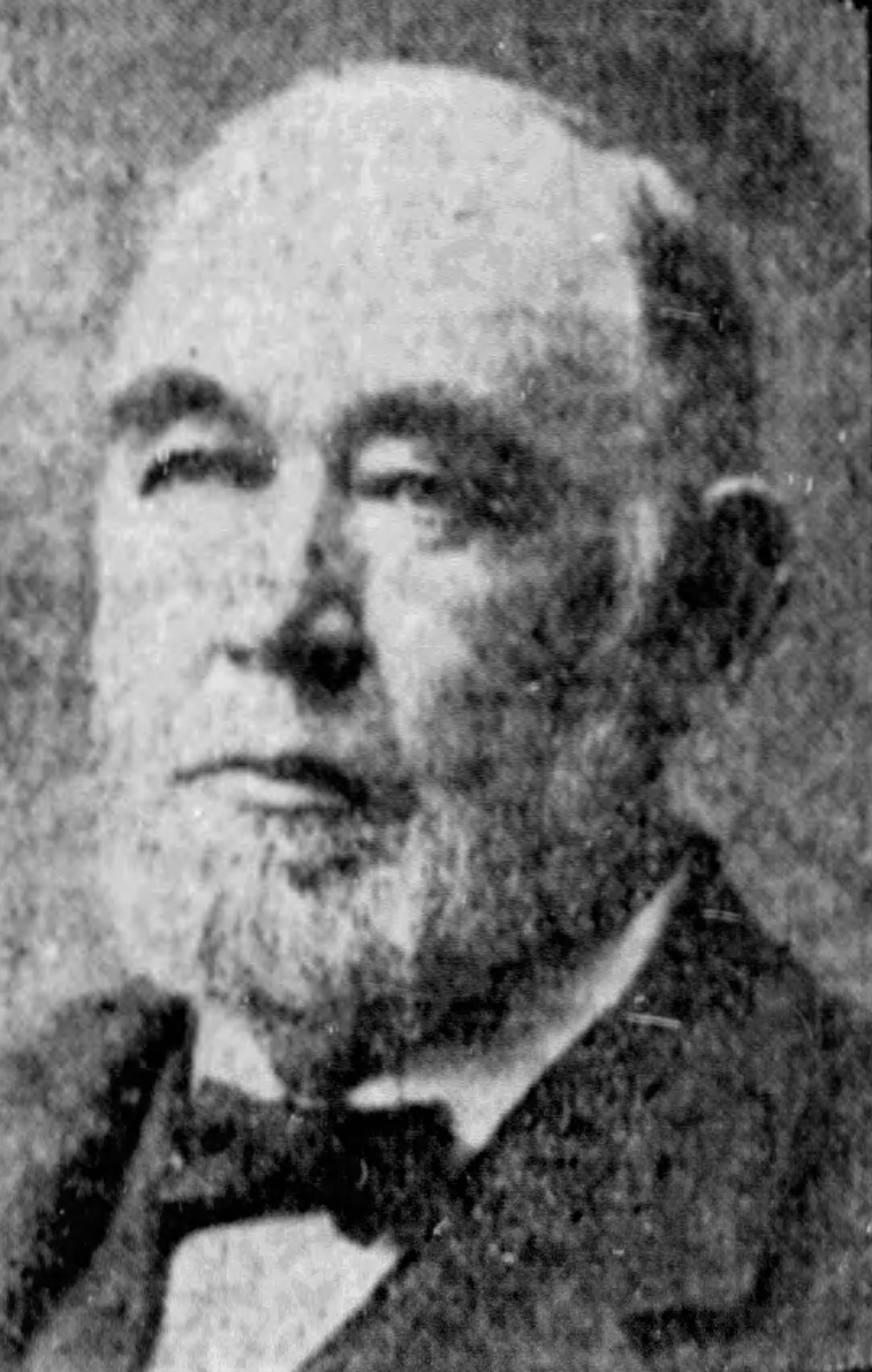

Member of the U.S. House of Representatives from North Carolina's 4th district
- In office March 4, 1887 – March 3, 1889
- Preceded by: William Ruffin Cox
- Succeeded by: Benjamin H. Bunn

Postmaster of Raleigh
- In office 1881–1885

Personal details
- Born: November 14, 1834 Eagle Rock, North Carolina
- Died: September 22, 1917 (aged 82)
- Resting place: Historic Oakwood Cemetery, Raleigh, North Carolina

John Nichols (November 14, 1834 – September 22, 1917) was an American printer and politician who served as a U.S. congressman from the state of North Carolina between 1887 and 1889.

== Early life ==
Nichols was born near Eagle Rock in Wake County, North Carolina. He attended the common schools and worked for six years in the printing trade. At age twenty-one, he studied at the Lovejoy Academy in Raleigh for a year, then opened a book and job printing business and published a newspaper.

== Printing and newspaper career ==
Following his education, Nichols worked in the printing and newspaper industry. He was an early member of the Raleigh Typographical Society, which became the Raleigh Typographical Union No. 54 in 1860. He owned one slave until 1865. After the war, he became a member of the middle class. In 1867, Nichols joined with his brother-in-law John C. Gorman and their friend John Neathery to create the printing firm Nichols, Gorman, and Neathery. That August, he appealed to the typographical union local to reduce its wage scale for journeymen. The local refused and investigated Nichols' firm for underpaying workers, but uncovered "nothing worth of action". As a result, Nichols became an inactive and eventually honorary member of the union.

Nichols and Gorman produced a Hand-Book for County Officers in 1868 and sold it at cost in the hopes of helping new Republicans elected to local offices. That year, Neathery was appointed state printer, and Nichols and Gorman used their print shop to assist him in issuing state publications. In 1871, Nichols and Gorman launched a newspaper, the Raleigh Daily Telegram, which they put forth as a politically independent publication. In it they condemned the Ku Klux Klan and Union League as extremist manifestations of the Conservative and Republican parties, respectively. They also postulated an economic vision for a postwar North Carolina, rooted in an agricultural system devoted to food production instead of cash crops and complimented by increasing industry.

== Early political career and labor activism ==
Nichols was a leader in founding the North Carolina Institute for the Deaf and Dumb and the Blind, and served as its principal from 1873 to 1877. Following the triumph of the Democratic candidate in the 1876 gubernatorial election, Nichols sought out federal Republican patronage positions. He was a revenue-stamp agent in Durham from 1879 to 1881, Raleigh's postmaster from 1881 to 1885, and then secretary and treasurer of the State Fair association.

Nichols joined the Knights of Labor in 1884. In August 1886, the Knights of Labor in North Carolina formed a State Assembly and accorded to Nichols the office of master workman.

== Congressional career ==
=== Campaign and election ===
In 1886, Nichols campaigned for election to the United States House of Representatives from North Carolina's 4th congressional district as a political independent. Catering to the sympathies of laborers and farmers, he denounced both the Democratic and Republican parties as unable to represent the interests of the people. He pushed for policies of facilitating labor organization, limited work hours, the prohibition of child labor, railroad regulation, uniform bankruptcy laws, land reform and stricter immigration laws. The Democratic press highlighted Nichols' associations with Republicans, accused him of growing expectant of patronage, and accused him of using his Knights of Labor affiliation to his benefit.

In the election, Nichols faced Democratic nominee John Graham. Graham campaign on a platform of opposition to tariffs and internal revenue taxes. Nichols prevailed in the election by a margin of over 1,500 votes. Nichols served one term of two years (March 4, 1887 – March 3, 1889), being defeated for reelection in 1888.

Nichols' congressional victory buoyed the aspirations of the Knights of Labor, and he subsequently summoned an extraordinary session of the state assembly in Raleigh in 1887 as the new General Assembly convened for its regular session. The Knights assembly subsequently crafted a platform of labor reform to lobby for, including the creation of a state labor bureau, reform of the convict leasing system, and the imposition of a 10-hour work day. Farmers of the state also held a convention which Nichols attended but adopted a largely different set of legislative goals. Nichols' victory also precipitated growing disputes within the Knights over the nature of the organizations' political involvement, including partisan divides and questions of whether politicians were simply using the order to their own advantage.

Feuds erupted between Nichols and other labor leaders. He refused to assist Raleigh Knights leader John Ray with his financial problems and let Ray be expelled from the order due to lack of dues payments. Meanwhile, at the behest of the Knights, the General Assembly created the Office of the Commissioner of Labor and Governor Alfred Moore Scales appointed an attorney, Wesley N. Jones, to fill the position. Jones' selection angered the Knights, and he subsequently tapped Knights figure J. M. Broughton to work as his chief clerk in his office, engendering further distrust, as they feared Jones would glean Broughton's knowledge of the Knights' affairs to thwart their goals. Nichols, sharing this assessment, demanded Broughton's resignation and secured the support of national Knights leader Terence V. Powderly, leading Broughton to quit the position.

=== Congressional tenure ===
In the U.S. House, Nichols refused to join the causes of either the Republican or Democratic parties.

The proposed Mills bill lowered tariffs and eliminated internal excise taxes. Nichols supported high tariffs but did not want to support the internal levies. In an attempt to avoid voting on the loaded measure, he proposed independent legislation which eliminated internal taxes. Nichols' bill never progressed out of committee, and, when forced to decide on the Mills bill, he voted against it. He also supported an increase in pensions for soldiers of the Union Army and sought an appointment for his son to the United States Military Academy at West Point.

=== Reelection campaign ===
He improved his margin in Raleigh but lost all rural precincts in the election.

== Later life ==
On July 22, 1889, he was appointed chief of the Division of Mail and Files of the U.S. Treasury Department. He became private secretary to the Assistant Secretary of the Treasury on April 1, 1893, resigning just 2 months later on June 30.

Nichols returned to Raleigh, and served briefly in the office of the Collector of Internal Revenue from November 26 to December 17, 1893. He was appointed United States commissioner for the eastern district of North Carolina on July 1, 1897, serving until his death in Raleigh in 1917. He was buried in Raleigh's Oakwood Cemetery.

== Works cited ==
- Beckel, Deborah (2011). Radical Reform: Interracial Politics in Post-Emancipation North Carolina. Charlottesville: University of Virginia Press. ISBN 978-0-8139-3002-2.
- McLaurin, Melton (July 1972). "The Knights of Labor in North Carolina Politics". The North Carolina Historical Review. 49 (3): 298–315. JSTOR 23528888.

U.S. House of Representatives
Preceded by William Ruffin Cox	U.S. Congressman from North Carolina's 4th district 1887–1889	Succeeded by Benjamin H. Bunn
