= Don Stallings =

American football player (1938–2026)

No. 76
- Positions: Defensive end, defensive tackle

Personal information
- Born: November 18, 1938; Rocky Mount, North Carolina, U.S.
- Died: June 9, 2026 (aged 87); Rocky Mount, North Carolina, U.S.
- Listed height: 6 ft 4 in (1.93 m)
- Listed weight: 250 lb (113 kg)

Career information
- High school: Rocky Mount
- College: North Carolina
- NFL draft: 1960: 5th round, 52nd overall pick
- AFL draft: 1960

Career history
- Washington Redskins (1960)

Career NFL statistics
- Games played: 9
- Stats at Pro Football Reference

Alva Donald Stallings (November 18, 1938 – June 9, 2026) was an American professional football player who was a defensive lineman for the Washington Redskins of the National Football League (NFL). He played college football for the North Carolina Tar Heels and was selected in the fifth round of the 1960 NFL draft.

Stallings died in Rocky Mount, North Carolina, on June 9, 2026, at the age of 87.
