= The Dunn Center =

Performance venue

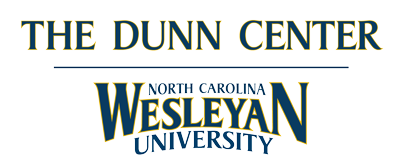
- Interactive map of The Dunn Center
- Location: 3400 N Wesleyan Blvd, Rocky Mount, North Carolina 27804
- Coordinates: 36.0190799°N 77.779075°W
- Capacity: 1,180

Construction
- Opened: 1996

Website
- ncwu.edu/dunn-center-performing-arts/

The Dunn Center, located on the campus of North Carolina Wesleyan University in Rocky Mount, North Carolina, is a premier cultural venue in Eastern North Carolina. Since its opening, the center has served as a hub for artistic expression, community engagement, concerts/entertainment and educational enrichment.

== History ==
The Dunn Center was established as part of North Carolina Wesleyan University's commitment to fostering the arts and providing a space for both academic and public performances. It was named in honor of a major benefactor whose vision helped bring the center to life. The facility has grown into a cornerstone of the university and the broader Rocky Mount community, hosting a wide range of events from theatrical productions and art shows to symphonic concerts.

== Facilities ==
The center includes the Minges Auditorium, a 1,180-seat venue equipped with state-of-the-art acoustics and lighting, making it suitable for concerts, plays, and large-scale productions. Additional spaces include the Carlton Board Room, Powers Recital Hall, Garner Lobby banquet hall, Mims Art Gallery and Gravely Art Gallery, which support smaller performances, meetings, and visual art exhibitions.

Minges Auditorium is one of the largest performing arts facilities in eastern North Carolina. The stage has full technical facilities, including fly space and orchestra pit. It is the venue for the Dunn Center Performing Arts Series, the home of the Tar River Orchestra and Chorus, and the site of Wesleyan Theatre Department productions.

== Notable Performances and Events ==
Over the years, the Dunn Center has hosted a diverse array of performers and events, including: Balsam Range, Pat Boone, Steven Curtis Chapman, Roy Clark, Crowder, Dailey & Vincent, Departure - Journey Tribute, Lee Greenwood, Merle Haggard, Vicki Lawrence, Leahy, The Lettermen, Malpass Brothers, Point of Grace, “The President’s Own” United States Marine Band, Rumours - Fleetwood Mac Tribute, Brooke Simpson, finalist from The Voice (2018), Steep Canyon Rangers, Theloneus Monk Jr., Ronan Tynan (Irish Tenor), Doc Watson, Rhonda Vincent, Ali Siddiq (comedian) and more.

=== Notable Art Shows and Exhibits ===
Fantastic Little Paintings by artist, Bob Ross, adorned the walls of The Mims and Gravely Galleries at The Dunn Center from November 2023 through January 2024 and also in 2024-25. It was the first time a Bob Ross exhibition had been to North Carolina and the largest, with over 75 paintings, ever seen under one roof globally. More than 13,000 visitors poured in from all over the world to see this once-in-a-lifetime exhibit during the showings. Showing ran from November 2, 2023 – January 4, 2024 and also November 2024 – January 2025.

Also, on display from November 2025 to January 2026, was The Life and Art of Charles Schulz, a heartwarming exhibition celebrating the beloved creator of Snoopy, Charlie Brown, and the entire Peanuts gang. Over 1500+ visitors adorned. Through original comic strips, personal quotes, photographs, and insights into his influences, the traveling Life & Art of Charles Schulz exhibit reveals how Schulz used humor, vulnerability, and everyday moments to connect with millions around the world.

== Community and Educational Impact ==
In addition to professional performances, the Dunn Center supports local arts through partnerships with groups like the Tar River Swing Band and Orchestra, and the Wesleyan Players, the university’s student theater troupe. It also hosts lectures, conferences, and community events, reinforcing its role as a cultural and educational asset.

== Accolades and Recognition ==
The Dunn Center is widely regarded as one of the top performing arts venues in Eastern North Carolina. It has received praise for its acoustics, accessibility, and programming diversity. On platforms like Tripadvisor, it holds a 5-star rating, reflecting its popularity and quality.
