= Chuck Robbins =

American businessman (born 1965/66)

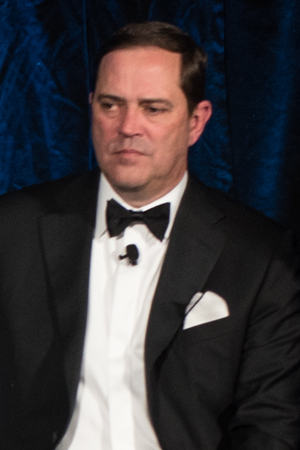
- Born: 1965 or 1966 (age 60–61); Grayson, Georgia, U.S.
- Education: University of North Carolina, Chapel Hill (BMath)
- Occupation: Businessman
- Title: Chairman and CEO, Cisco Systems
- Board member of: BlackRock
- Children: 4

Charles H. Robbins (born 1965 or 1966) is an American businessman. He is the chairman and CEO of Cisco Systems.

== Early life ==
Robbins was born in Grayson, Georgia, and educated at Rocky Mount High School in Rocky Mount, North Carolina. In 1987, he earned a Bachelor of Mathematics degree from the University of North Carolina at Chapel Hill.

== Career ==
Robbins began his career as an application developer for North Carolina National Bank (now part of Bank of America). He joined Wellfleet Communications followed by a brief tenure at Ascend Communications before joining Cisco in 1997.

Robbins filled various posts at Cisco, including senior vice president of the Americas and senior vice president of Worldwide Field Operations, a role in which he led Cisco's Worldwide Sales and Partner Organizations and built out Cisco's partnership program.

In May 2015, Cisco announced that CEO and chairman John Chambers would step down as CEO in July 2015 while remaining as chairman. Robbins, then a senior vice president, was named as his successor. Mentored by Chambers, Robbins was unanimously voted in as the company's new chief executive, becoming CEO of Cisco Systems in July 2015.

As CEO, Robbins became noted for accelerating the pace of Cisco's modern growth, while disrupting outdated working modes, promoting employee trust based in transparency of policy and process, and humanitarian policies and workplace diversity.

Robbins has advocated for corporate social responsibility. However, in 2018, he said that talk of corporate social responsibility is becoming obsolete and just expected of "corporate icons."

In 2018, as the GDPR came into effect, Robbins called for more regulation and for the tech industry to help educate regulators. In February 2019, Robbins promoted the need for comprehensive global privacy legislation, asserting privacy as “a fundamental human right."

In 2019, Robbins advocated against a 15% increase on tariffs for Chinese goods.

In 2023, Robbins's total compensation at Cisco was $31.8 million, up 37% from the previous year and representing a CEO-to-median worker pay ratio of 267-to-1. For 2024, Robbins's total compensation from Cisco was $38.2 million.

== Boards and affiliations ==
Robbins serves the World Economic Forum as the chair for the IT Governors Steering Committee and as a member of the International Business Council. He is a member of the Ford Foundation board of trustees. He is a director for BlackRock and for The Business Roundtable where he chairs the Immigration Committee.

In 2018, Robbins authored a statement on behalf of Business Roundtable that applauded bipartisan lawmakers working to reform immigration policies, while urging the White House "Administration to end immediately the policy of separating accompanied minors from their parents," decrying the practice as "cruel and contrary to American values."

Robbins spoke at the World Economic Forum in Davos, Switzerland in 2016, 2017, 2018, at the 2019 WEF annual general meeting, as well as the 2024 annual meeting.

He has been a board member of the MS Society of Northern California, a member of the Advisory Board of Georgia Tech, and a member of the International Council for the Belfer Center for Science and International Affairs at Harvard University. He is also a member of the 2019 class of the American Academy of Arts and Sciences.

Robbins also serves as honorary counsel to Destination: Home, a non-profit organization devoted to ending homelessness in Santa Clara County, where Cisco's headquarters is located.

== Personal life ==
Robbins is a fan of North Carolina Tar Heels men's basketball and participates in social media. He is married with four children and lives in Los Gatos, California.
