= William F. Strowd =

American politician

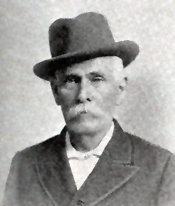

Member of the U.S. House of Representatives from North Carolina's 4th district
- In office March 4, 1895 – March 3, 1899
- Preceded by: Benjamin H. Bunn
- Succeeded by: John W. Atwater

Personal details
- Born: William Franklin Strowd; December 7, 1832 Chapel Hill, North Carolina
- Died: December 12, 1911 (aged 79) Chapel Hill, North Carolina
- Party: Democratic
- Occupation: Farmer

William Franklin Strowd (December 7, 1832 – December 12, 1911) was an American farmer and Confederate American Civil War veteran who served two terms as a Populist U.S. Congressman from North Carolina between 1895 and 1899.

== Biography ==
Strowd was born near Chapel Hill, North Carolina in 1832 and attended local schools.

=== Civil War ===
A farmer, he was a private in the Confederate Army during the American Civil War.

=== Career ===
Strowd was a member of the North Carolina Constitution Convention of 1875. In 1892, he unsuccessfully sought election as a Populist to the U.S. House.

==== Congress ====
In 1894, he succeeded, and served two terms in Washington, D.C., in the 54th and 55th Congresses.

=== Later career and death ===
He did not seek renomination in 1898, and died in 1911 in Chapel Hill, where he is buried.

U.S. House of Representatives
| Preceded by Benjamin H. Bunn | Member of the U.S. House of Representatives from North Carolina's 4th congressional district 1895–1899 | Succeeded by John W. Atwater |
