= Benjamin H. Bunn =

American politician (1844–1907)

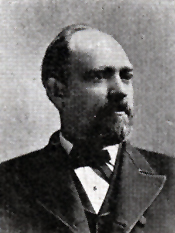

Postmaster of Rocky Mount, North Carolina
- In office April 23, 1895 – July 27, 1897

Member of the U.S. House of Representatives from North Carolina's 4th district
- In office March 4, 1889 – March 3, 1895
- Preceded by: John Nichols
- Succeeded by: William F. Strowd

Member of the North Carolina House of Representatives
- In office 1883–1885

Personal details
- Born: Benjamin Hickman Bunn; October 19, 1844 Nash County, North Carolina, U.S.
- Died: August 25, 1907 (aged 62) Nash County, North Carolina, U.S.
- Resting place: Pineview Cemetery
- Party: Democratic
- Occupation: Politician, lawyer

Military service
- Allegiance: Confederate States of America
- Branch/service: Confederate States Army
- Rank: Captain (United States)
- Unit: 47th North Carolina Regiment
- Battles/wars: American Civil War

Benjamin Hickman Bunn (October 19, 1844 – August 25, 1907) was a U.S. Representative from North Carolina.

Born on a farm in Nash County, near Rocky Mount, North Carolina, Bunn attended the local schools. During the Civil War he enlisted in the Confederate States Army as a second lieutenant in Company A, 47th North Carolina Regiment. He was promoted successively and became captain of the 4th Company of Sharpshooters, MacRae's Brigade, Army of Northern Virginia from 1861 to 1865. He studied law and was admitted to the bar in 1866 and commenced practice in Rocky Mount, North Carolina.

Bunn was elected mayor of Rocky Mount in 1867. He served as a delegate to the State constitutional convention in 1875 and to the Democratic National Convention in 1880. He served as a member of the State house of representatives 1883–1885.

Bunn was elected as a Democrat to the Fifty-first, Fifty-second, and Fifty-third Congresses (March 4, 1889 – March 3, 1895). He served as chairman of the Committee on Claims (Fifty-second and Fifty-third Congresses). He was not a candidate for renomination in 1894. Postmaster of Rocky Mount, North Carolina, from April 23, 1895, until the appointment of his successor on July 27, 1897. He resumed the practice of law. He died in Nash County, near Rocky Mount, North Carolina, August 25, 1907. He was interred in Pineview Cemetery.

His home near Rocky Mount, Benvenue, was listed on the National Register of Historic Places in 1982.

== Sources ==
- United States Congress. "Benjamin H. Bunn (id: B001062)". Biographical Directory of the United States Congress.

U.S. House of Representatives
Preceded by John Nichols	Member of the U.S. House of Representatives from North Carolina's 4th congressional district 1889–1895	Succeeded by William F. Strowd
