= Benvenue =

Historic house in North Carolina, United States

- U.S. National Register of Historic Places
- Location within North Carolina Location within the United States
- Location: 330 Southern Blvd., near Rocky Mount, North Carolina
- Coordinates: 35°58′35″N 77°49′20″W
- Area: 11.6 acres (4.7 ha)
- Built: 1844
- Architectural style: Second Empire, Influence
- NRHP reference No.: 82003493
- Added to NRHP: April 29, 1982

Benvenue is a historic plantation house located near Rocky Mount, Nash County, North Carolina. Originally built in 1844, the house was expanded and extensively remodeled to its present Second Empire form in 1889. It is a large 2 1/2-story, three bay by three bay, frame dwelling with a one-story rear ell. It features a steep mansard roof with imbricated and floral patterned slate tiles. Also on the property are the contributing frame kitchen, dovetailed log rootcellar, frame dairyhouse, smokehouses, commissary, a restored greenhouse, spring house, and a one-room schoolhouse. It was the home of Congressman Benjamin H. Bunn (1844-1907).

It was listed on the National Register of Historic Places in 1982.
