= Rocky Mount Mills =

- U.S. National Register of Historic Places
- U.S. Historic district – Contributing property

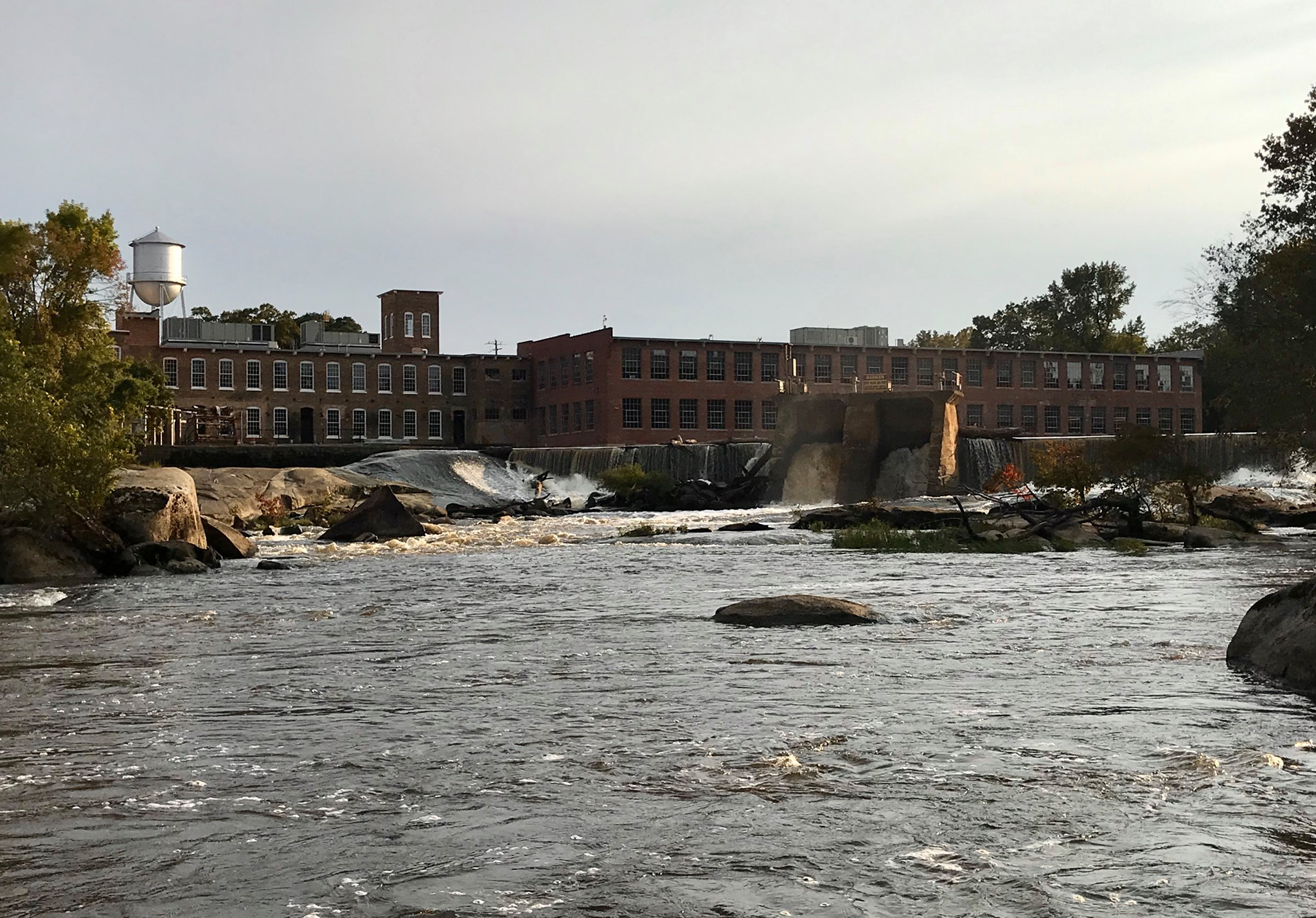
- As seen from Battle Park on the Tar River

- Location within North Carolina Location within the United States
- Location: 1151 Falls Rd, Rocky Mount, North Carolina
- Coordinates: 35°57′33″N 77°48′10″W
- Built: 1816
- Architectural style: Greek Revival
- Website: www.rockymountmills.com
- NRHP reference No.: 80002891
- Added to NRHP: February 1, 1980

Rocky Mount Mills, located in Rocky Mount, North Carolina, was the second cotton mill constructed in the state of North Carolina, dating back to 1816. Capitol Broadcasting Company bought the 150-acre (61 ha) mills in the 2007 and has since redeveloped it into a mixed-use campus of breweries, restaurants, lofts, office, and event space.

== History ==
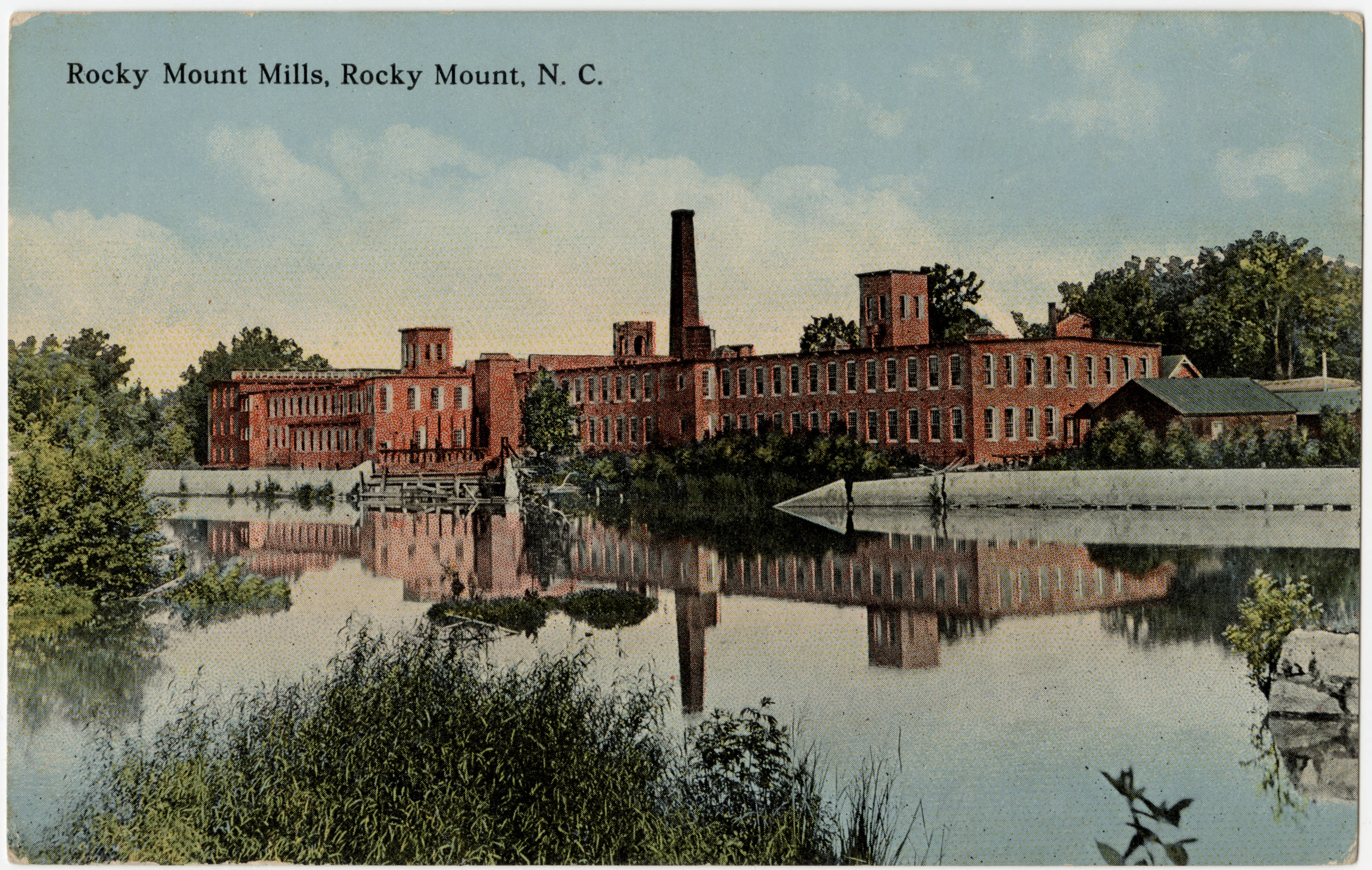
Local postcard of the Mill

The first use of slave labor in a cotton mill in North Carolina occurred in 1817, when Colonel Joel Battle and Henry A. Donaldson founded the Rocky Mount Mills on the Tar River. The mills had over two thousand spindles and had a working force made of only black people. The majority were slaves but a few were free people. Black people were continuously used by the mills for thirty-four years. In 1825, Henry A. Donaldson built a new mill in Fayetteville roughly the size of the one in Rocky Mount. The mill in Fayetteville used only slaves.

"...Especially before the Civil War, according to historian Holland Thompson, "a majority of the people in the Middle and Western counties [of North Carolina] dressed chiefly in the clothes of domestic or local manufacture." A superintendent of the Rocky Mount Mills recalled that in the 1850s he sold most of the coarse yarns produced at the mill "in five pound bundles for the country trade- this was woven by the country women on hand looms." He sold the surplus yarns for "coarse filling for the Philadelphia market." During the antebellum period and well into the twentieth century, North Carolina was known for its "little spinning mills" that produced lower grades of yarn for home manufacture and later for the weaving mills of New England and the Middle Atlantic States."

During the last months of the conflict, the Confederacy drew its entire supply of textile goods from North Carolina mills. Northern troops recognized the significance of the textile industry's contribution to the war effort. In raids led by General William T. Sherman, Union troops laid waste to most of Eastern North Carolina's manufacturing base by burning the Rocky Mount Mill on the Tar River, the Great Falls Mill in Rockingham, NC, and five of the six mills in the Fayetteville vicinity. In the western counties, Union General George Stoneman stationed his cavalry in the Fries Woolen and Cotton Mill while his troops destroyed nearly 1,700 bales of cotton the company had stored in High Point, NC. Stoneman's raiders also set fire to Patterson's Mill in Caldwell County, a woolen mill in Guilford County, and a cotton mill in Salisbury, NC that had served as a Confederate prison during the war. Those mills that escaped direct physical destruction during the final months of the war nevertheless entered the postwar period in a weakened condition with little operating capital, obsolete or worn-out machinery, and a sharply reduced demand from local markets.

From 1825 to 1883, the Battle family maintained ownership of the mill. As the southern cotton industry expanded after the Civil War, the cotton mill experienced rapid growth. The company also supported a residential village for employees, which was eventually incorporated into the city of Rocky Mount in the 1920s. The mill was a major supplier of cotton yarn to the United States Army during World War II. The mills and surrounding mill village are included in the Rocky Mount Mills Village Historic District.

The United States suffered a general decline in the textile industry, and by the time the mill closed in 1996, it was the oldest Southern textile company.

== Redevelopment ==
Rocky Mount Mills has been in the process of redevelopment since 2014 by Capitol Broadcasting Company, which also owns the popular American Tobacco campus in downtown Durham, North Carolina. Its main attraction is as an incubator for craft breweries, as well as being home to a number of restaurants. The mill itself has been turned into lofts, office, and event space. The approximately 100 historical homes in the mills village have also been updated and are available to rent.

In 2019, the River and Twine hotel opened on the campus, a collection of 20 boutique tiny house hotels. The next phase of development is Goat Island on the Tar River, which will offer public access to hiking trails, sandy beaches, and paddling sports.
