= Rocky Mount Sports Complex =

Sports venue in Rocky Mount, North Carolina

- Interactive map of Rocky Mount Sports Complex
- Coordinates: 35.966954°N 77.790575°W

The Rocky Mount Sports Complex is a large-scale sports complex located in Rocky Mount, North Carolina.

A division of the City of Rocky Mount Parks and Recreation Department, the Rocky Mount Sports Complex provides facilities for city recreational programs such as baseball, softball, soccer, lacrosse, field hockey, and football. The 143-acre (0.58 km^{2}) park on Centura Blvd. includes:

- 6 Youth Baseball Fields
- 4 Softball Fields
- A Championship Baseball Field
- 2 Basketball Courts
- Restrooms/Concession Buildings
- A Baseball Training Ground
- Walking Trails
- Playgrounds and a Sprayground
- 8 Championship Soccer Fields (Currently Under Construction)

The Rocky Mount Sports Complex is one of the largest sports complexes on the eastern seaboard. During weekdays the fields will be used by Parks and Recreation Department city Athletics Programs. On weekends the Sports Complex will host tournament action, bringing some of the best local, state and national sports teams to the area.

Adjacent to the Rocky Mount Sports Complex sits the 5,000-seat multi-use Rocky Mount Athletic Complex. The Football Stadium is also called home to the Rocky Mount High School Football Team. Div. II Elizabeth City State University also plays football annually in the Down East Viking Classic at the facility.
