= Rocky Mount, North Carolina =

City in northeast North Carolina

Rocky Mount
- City
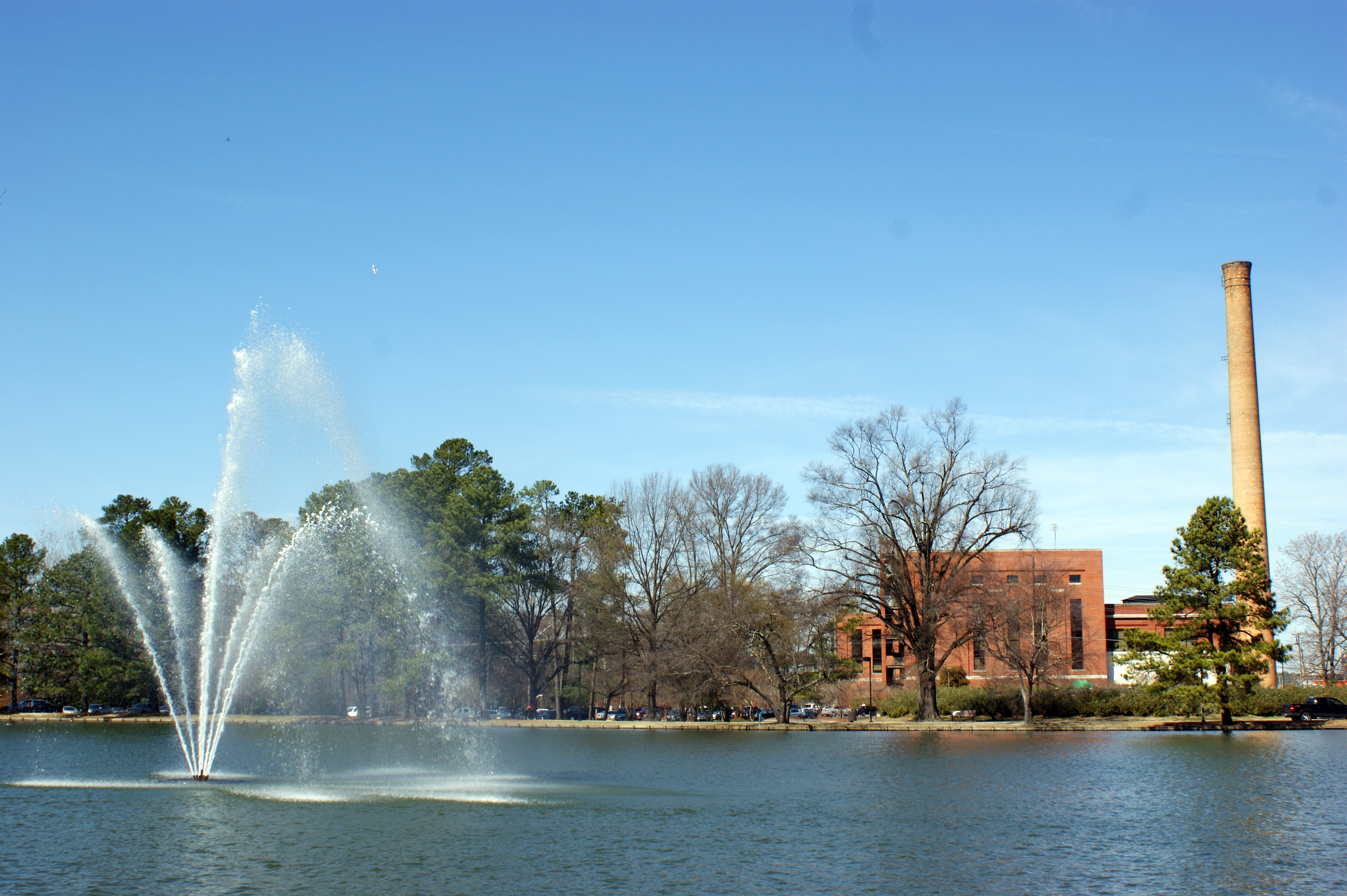
- Rocky Mount City Lake Park

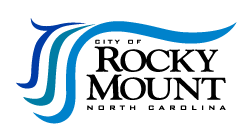
- Flag Seal Logo
- Nickname: City On The Rise
- Motto: "The Center Of It All"
- Location in Edgecombe and Nash counties and North Carolina

- Location within North Carolina Location within the United States
- Coordinates: 35°58′06″N 77°48′16″W
- Country: United States
- State: North Carolina
- Counties: Edgecombe, Nash
- Founded: March 22, 1816
- Incorporated: February 19, 1867
- Named for: Rocky mounds along the Tar River

Government
  - Type: Council–Manager
  - Mayor: Sandy Roberson
  - City manager: Peter Varney
  - City council: Members: Andre Knight; Reuben C. Blackwell, IV; Richard Joyner; T.J. Walker; Lige Daughtridge; Tom Harris; Jabaris D. Walker

Area
  - Total: 44.89 sq mi (116.27 km^{2})
  - Land: 44.68 sq mi (115.73 km^{2})
  - Water: 0.21 sq mi (0.54 km^{2}) 0.47%
- Elevation: 85 ft (26 m)

Population (2020)
  - Total: 54,341
  - Estimate (2023): 54,245
  - Density: 1,216.1/sq mi (469.55/km^{2})
  - Urban: 63,297 (US: 432nd)
  - Urban density: 1,408/sq mi (543.6/km^{2})
  - Metro: 145,383 (US: 295th)
- Time zone: UTC−5 (EST)
  - Summer (DST): UTC−4 (EDT)
- ZIP Codes: 27801, 27802, 27803, 27804, 27809, 27815
- Area code: 252
- FIPS code: 37-57500
- GNIS feature ID: 2404643
- Website: www.rockymountnc.gov

Rocky Mount is a city in Nash and Edgecombe counties in the U.S. state of North Carolina. The city's population was 54,341 as of the 2020 census, making it the 20th-most populous city in North Carolina.

It is the principal city of the Rocky Mount metropolitan area—often called the "Twin Counties"—which had an estimated population of 145,383 in 2023. Rocky Mount is also an anchor city of the Rocky Mount-Wilson-Roanoke Rapids, NC Combined Statistical Area, which had an estimated population of 288,366 in 2023.

English and Scots traders encountered the indigenous people in this area of the falls of the Tar River beginning in the mid-1700s. Incorporated in 1867, the community continued to develop through the 19th century based on agriculture (cotton and tobacco), manufacturing of textiles (made possible by the water power of the falls), and development of rail transportation to link the town to major markets.

Since the late 20th century, the economy of Rocky Mount has diversified into biomedical pharmaceuticals, manufacturing, and logistics. Rocky Mount has twice received the All-America City Award from the National Civic League: in 1969 and 1999.

== History ==
=== Beginnings ===
The region around the Tar River was continuously inhabited by various cultures of indigenous people for 12,000 years. It had long been home to the historic Tuscarora people, who spoke an Iroquoian language. After English colonists and indigenous allies waged the Tuscarora War in the early 1700s; most survivors migrated to the North. The main party of the Tuscarora settled by 1722 with other Iroquoian peoples of the Five Nations, south of the Great Lakes in what became central and western New York. They became the Sixth Nation of the Iroquois Confederacy.

More English speakers began to settle the area along the Tar River. They settled along the fall line between the Piedmont and coastal plain, below which the rivers were navigable to the coast. The difference in height meant that the downstream waters could power mills.

The Falls of the Tar River Primitive Baptist Church was established in 1757. As the church was the center of community life, its records were the first civil and vital records of the developing village. Its congregation effectively administered law enforcement, with officers issuing citations for crimes.

=== 19th century ===
A post office was established at the falls of the Tar River on March 22, 1816. At this point, the name "Rocky Mount" officially appears in documented history, referring to the rocky mound at the falls of the Tar River. Rocky Mount Mills, the second cotton mill in the state of North Carolina, was built there soon after in 1818. Its proprietors were two entrepreneurs and Joel Battle, grandson of an original colonial settler here. Battle bought out the other proprietors before turning over the enterprise to his cousin James Smith Battle. Until the 1850s, the mill operated with the labor of enslaved African Americans. They also comprised most of the labor on the cotton plantations.

Beginning then, the mill owners hired exclusively white women and girls as mill workers for the rest of the century.

The Battle family was also involved in the construction of the longest continuous railroad in the world up to that time, the Wilmington and Weldon Railroad, which ran about two miles (3 km) east of the mill. It connected the area to major ports in Virginia to the north and the port of Wilmington, North Carolina to the south. The tracks first reached Rocky Mount on Christmas Eve in 1839. In 1840, a train of cars en route to Wilmington stopped in Rocky Mount to import some "Old Nash" for special toasts at opening festivities. The fame of Nash County apple brandy spread from there.

The railroad stimulated development of the town. In 1871, the county line was moved from the Tar River to its present location in the center of the tracks. The Raleigh-Tarboro stage route also passed just south of Rocky Mount (roughly where I-95 and U.S. 64 run today), and for a time was the logical debarking point for railroad travelers wishing to proceed east or west.

During the Civil War, the surrounding region was raided in 1863 by Union troops under the command of Brigadier General Edward E. Potter. They burned down the mill, which supplied Confederate yarn and cloth. After the war ended, the owners rebuilt the mill. On February 19, 1867, the village outside the mill, which was largely devoted to worker housing, was incorporated as a town.

In the latter half of the 19th century, the tobacco industry became established in the state. Adjacent to the sandy coastal plain, Rocky Mount was well situated to take advantage of the rapidly rising demand for brightleaf tobacco that grew best in the sandy soil. Tobacco also shaped the city's social life. Warehouses where tobacco was stored and marketed began hosting balls for the community in the 1880s; these became known as "june germans" for the time of year and style of dance. June Germans eventually transformed into all-night dance parties and attracted musicians and socialites from miles around well into the 1900s. By the end of the 19th century, tobacco had surpassed King Cotton as the town's primary agricultural product.

=== 20th century ===
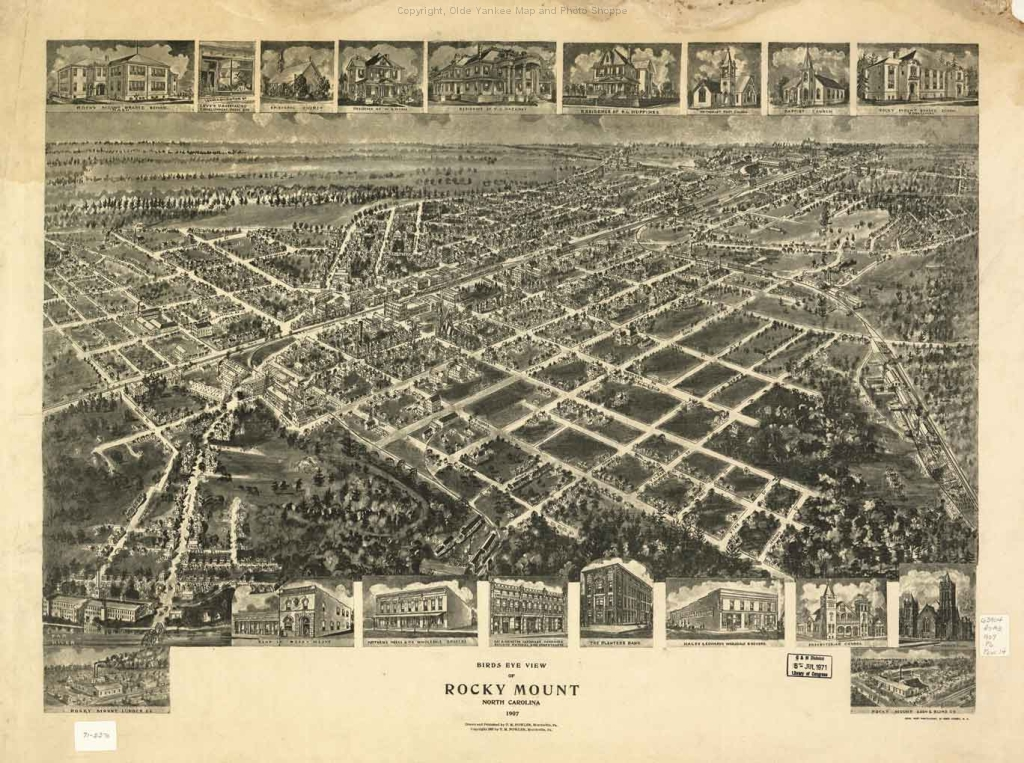
Rocky Mount in 1907

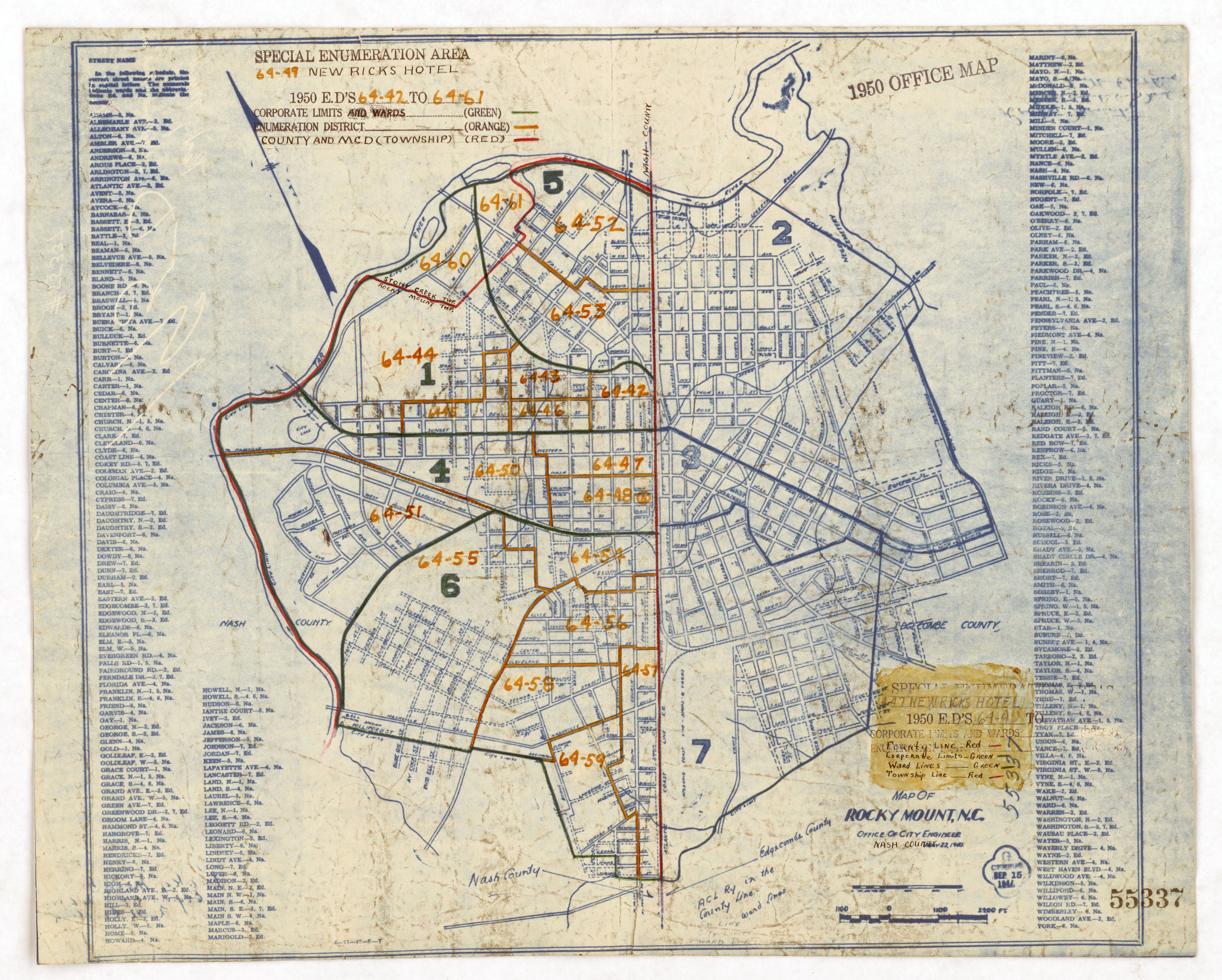
A map of Rocky Mount in 1950

At the turn of the 20th century, Rocky Mount became the northern headquarters of the Atlantic Coast Line Railroad, which located its major repair shops and yard facilities in the town. With it came an influx of railroad workers. In 1900, Rocky Mount's population was around 3,000.

On February 28, 1907, with a population around 7,500, Rocky Mount was officially incorporated as a city. A main railroad line, a well-established cotton mill, and productive farmland for brightleaf tobacco were major contributors to the area's growth and prosperity over the next decades. A vibrant central business district arose.

As in the rest of the South, North Carolina had imposed legal racial segregation, including restrictions and discrimination in housing. White suburbs developed largely on the west side of town, such as Villa Place and West Haven. Black neighborhoods, such as Crosstown and Around the "Y", where jazz musician Thelonious Monk was born, were concentrated on the east side of town.

Several notable Civil Rights events occurred in Rocky Mount. In 1946, African-American tobacco warehouse workers voted to organize in Rocky Mount as part of a broader nationwide movement known as Operation Dixie. It included voter registration to fight against the disenfranchisement of blacks and to take other political action against segregation. On November 27, 1962, Martin Luther King Jr. gave a speech at Booker T. Washington High School; he used his refrain "I have a dream" a year before his better known delivery at the March on Washington, which became famous.

Sanitation workers went on strike in 1978 when government sanitation workers protested their black co-worker being wrongfully arrested. He was acquitted in court on the charges. In 2018 the city council officially apologized to him for the case.

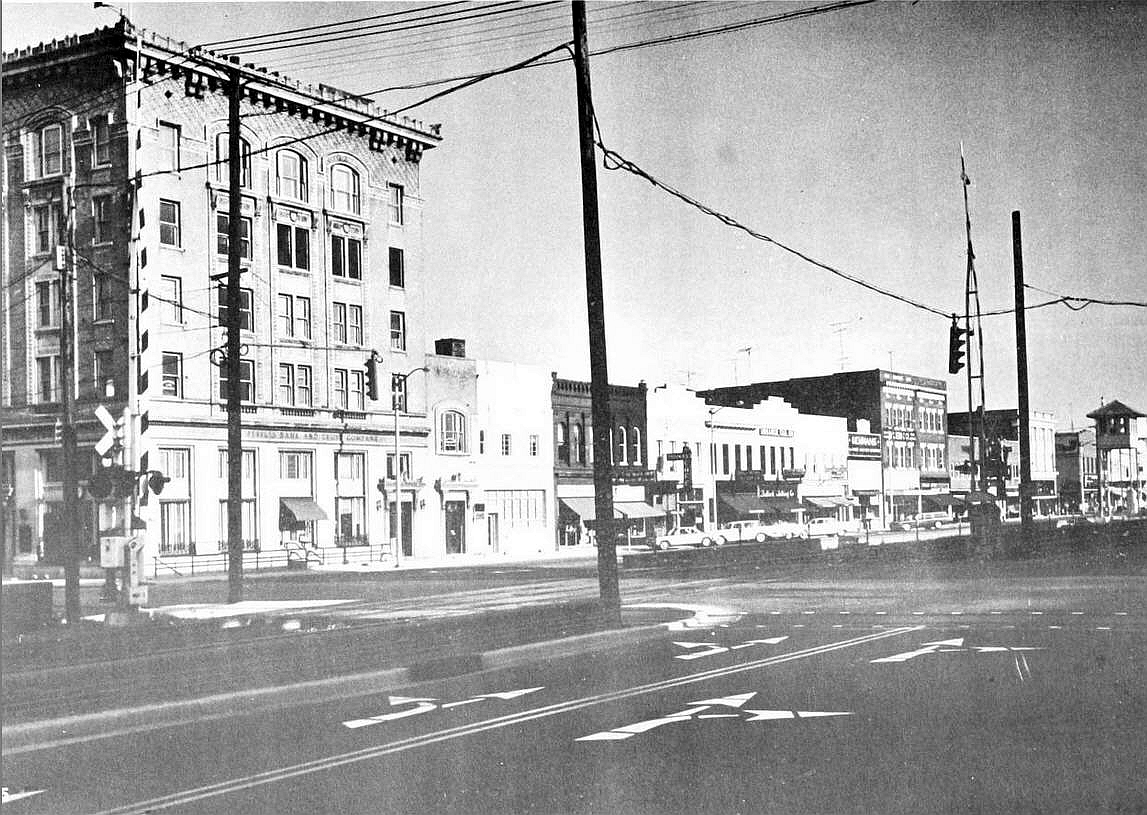
Downtown Rocky Mount, 1962

After WWII, the city continued to grow. In the 1950s and 1960s the city's economy diversified to include banking, manufacturing, pharmaceuticals, and the headquarters of a fast food chain known as Hardee's.

New higher education facilities were founded, including North Carolina Wesleyan College in 1956 and Nash Community College and Edgecombe Community College in 1968. In 1970, Rocky Mount received an All-America City Award. In the 1970s the city's hospitals were consolidated under Nash General Hospital. That was also the period of completion of Rocky Mount–Wilson Regional Airport.

From the 1980s, the inner city suffered urban decay, as businesses had moved out to suburban highway locations. Rocky Mount's downtown deteriorated as new neighborhoods and shopping malls were built, such as Golden East Crossing. The city expanded its boundaries by annexation; for instance, in 1996, annexing the town of Battleboro to the north of the city. In 1999, the city won its second All-America City Award.

In the fall of 1999 two hurricanes made landfall in eastern North Carolina. Both passed over Rocky Mount: Hurricane Dennis as a tropical storm in August with 20 inches (510 mm) of rain and Hurricane Floyd in September with nearly 17 inches (430 mm) of rain. Floyd is especially memorable because most localized flooding happened quickly overnight. Many residents were not aware of the flooding until the water came into their homes, and many required rescue. The hurricane resulted in the worst flooding in history of the Tar River, which had become saturated in August. It exceeded 500-year flood levels along its lower stretches, and many homes and businesses were destroyed.

=== 21st century ===
During the first decades of the 21st century, the city has encouraged efforts to revitalize the historic downtown. It has supported projects to renovate buildings such as the train station and Douglas Block, or repurpose them, such as the Imperial Centre for Arts and Sciences.

In 2007, Capitol Broadcasting Company bought Rocky Mount Mills. It is adapting it as a mixed-use campus of breweries, restaurants, residential lofts, and event space. Major new community projects include the 143-acre (58 ha) sports complex and 165,000-square-foot (15,300 m^{2}) downtown event center. In 2019, CSX, the successor company of the Atlantic Coast Line Railroad, broke ground on a new intermodal cargo terminal that is expected to stimulate the local economy in the next decade.

== Geography ==
Interactive map of Rocky Mount

Rocky Mount is located in northeastern North Carolina, at the fall line between the Atlantic Coastal Plain to the east and the Piedmont region to the west. The city is 58 miles (93 km) east of Raleigh, the state capital, 91 miles (146 km) northeast of Fayetteville, 144 miles (232 km) north of Wilmington, 19 miles (31 km) north of Wilson, 42 miles (68 km) south of Roanoke Rapids, and 127 miles (204 km) south of Richmond, Virginia.

According to the United States Census Bureau, the city has a total area of 44.89 square miles (116.3 km^{2}), of which 44.68 square miles (115.7 km^{2}) is land and 0.21 square miles (0.54 km^{2}) (0.47%) is water. The Tar River passes through the city from west to east, crossing the fall line at Upper Falls and Little Falls and descending 25 feet (7.6 m) within the city limits. The city boundaries straddle the line between Edgecombe and Nash counties, which follows the railroad tracks through the center of the city running north to south.

=== Neighborhoods ===
==== Historic Rocky Mount Mills Village ====
Situated near the Tar River, the Rocky Mount Mills Village grew in the late 19th and early 20th centuries as a small community of tenants working for the mill. Built between 1885 and 1940, each house in the historic district is recognized by the National Register of Historic Places.

Changes in industrialization eventually forced the closing of the mill. The workers had to find other housing. However, when the mill closed, the property remained intact. Though the property has been a rental for its entire existence, covenants are placed on the property to assure home ownership and owner occupancy and protect the historical integrity.

=== Climate ===
Rocky Mount has a humid subtropical climate (Köppen Cfa) characterized by cool, sometimes moderately cold winters, and hot, humid summers. The average high temperatures range from 51 °F (11 °C) in the winter to around 90 °F (32 °C) in the summer. The average low temperatures range from 31 °F (−1 °C) in the winter to around 69 °F (21 °C) in the summer.

Climate data for Rocky Mount, North Carolina (1991–2020 normals, extremes 1954–present)
Month	Jan	Feb	Mar	Apr	May	Jun	Jul	Aug	Sep	Oct	Nov	Dec	Year
Record high °F (°C)	78 (26)	82 (28)	89 (32)	96 (36)	98 (37)	106 (41)	105 (41)	103 (39)	102 (39)	101 (38)	86 (30)	80 (27)	106 (41)
Mean daily maximum °F (°C)	50.3 (10.2)	53.6 (12.0)	60.9 (16.1)	71.2 (21.8)	78.0 (25.6)	85.3 (29.6)	88.4 (31.3)	85.3 (29.6)	81.3 (27.4)	72.2 (22.3)	64.7 (18.2)	55.0 (12.8)	70.5 (21.4)
Daily mean °F (°C)	40.5 (4.7)	42.6 (5.9)	49.5 (9.7)	59.3 (15.2)	67.5 (19.7)	75.4 (24.1)	78.9 (26.1)	76.3 (24.6)	71.7 (22.1)	61.0 (16.1)	51.7 (10.9)	44.3 (6.8)	59.9 (15.5)
Mean daily minimum °F (°C)	30.6 (−0.8)	31.7 (−0.2)	38.1 (3.4)	47.3 (8.5)	57.0 (13.9)	65.4 (18.6)	69.3 (20.7)	67.4 (19.7)	62.2 (16.8)	49.7 (9.8)	38.8 (3.8)	33.7 (0.9)	49.3 (9.6)
Record low °F (°C)	−8 (−22)	4 (−16)	11 (−12)	25 (−4)	32 (0)	43 (6)	51 (11)	45 (7)	37 (3)	19 (−7)	16 (−9)	0 (−18)	−8 (−22)
Average precipitation inches (mm)	3.22 (82)	3.00 (76)	3.85 (98)	3.54 (90)	3.63 (92)	4.81 (122)	5.10 (130)	5.28 (134)	6.15 (156)	3.55 (90)	3.20 (81)	3.23 (82)	48.56 (1,233)
Average snowfall inches (cm)	1.9 (4.8)	0.3 (0.76)	0.2 (0.51)	0.0 (0.0)	0.0 (0.0)	0.0 (0.0)	0.0 (0.0)	0.0 (0.0)	0.0 (0.0)	0.0 (0.0)	0.0 (0.0)	0.4 (1.0)	2.8 (7.1)
Average precipitation days (≥ 0.0 in)	8.1	7.2	8.2	7.7	8.3	9.1	9.8	8.6	7.7	6.1	6.5	7.8	95.1
Average snowy days (≥ 0.1 in)	0.5	0.1	0.1	0.0	0.0	0.0	0.0	0.0	0.0	0.0	0.0	0.1	0.8
Source 1: NOAA
Source 2: Weather.com

== Demographics ==
Historical population
Census	Pop.	Note	%±
1870	357		—
1880	552		54.6%
1890	816		47.8%
1900	2,937		259.9%
1910	8,051		174.1%
1920	12,742		58.3%
1930	21,412		68.0%
1940	25,568		19.4%
1950	27,697		8.3%
1960	32,147		16.1%
1970	34,284		6.6%
1980	41,283		20.4%
1990	48,997		18.7%
2000	55,893		14.1%
2010	57,477		2.8%
2020	54,341		−5.5%
2023 (est.)	54,245		−0.2%
U.S. Decennial Census; 2020

=== Racial and ethnic composition ===
Rocky Mount city, North Carolina – Racial and ethnic composition Note: the US Census treats Hispanic/Latino as an ethnic category. This table excludes Latinos from the racial categories and assigns them to a separate category. Hispanics/Latinos may be of any race.
Race / Ethnicity (NH = Non-Hispanic)	Pop 2000	Pop 2010	Pop 2020	% 2000	% 2010	% 2020
White alone (NH)	22,548	18,610	14,470	40.34%	32.38%	26.63%
Black or African American alone (NH)	31,175	35,069	34,426	55.78%	61.01%	63.35%
Native American or Alaska Native alone (NH)	170	329	298	0.30%	0.57%	0.55%
Asian alone (NH)	375	540	757	0.67%	0.94%	1.39%
Native Hawaiian or Pacific Islander alone (NH)	12	10	26	0.02%	0.02%	0.05%
Other race alone (NH)	69	68	238	0.12%	0.12%	0.44%
Mixed race or Multiracial (NH)	511	745	1,454	0.91%	1.30%	2.68%
Hispanic or Latino (any race)	1,033	2,106	2,672	1.85%	3.66%	4.92%
Total	55,893	57,477	54,341	100.00%	100.00%	100.00%

=== 2020 census ===
As of the 2020 census, Rocky Mount had a population of 54,341. The median age was 41.3 years. 22.5% of residents were under the age of 18 and 19.8% of residents were 65 years of age or older. For every 100 females there were 83.2 males, and for every 100 females age 18 and over there were 78.2 males age 18 and over.

97.7% of residents lived in urban areas, while 2.3% lived in rural areas.

There were 23,095 households and 14,334 families in Rocky Mount, of which 27.9% had children under the age of 18 living in them. Of all households, 30.5% were married-couple households, 19.7% were households with a male householder and no spouse or partner present, and 43.4% were households with a female householder and no spouse or partner present. About 35.1% of all households were made up of individuals and 15.6% had someone living alone who was 65 years of age or older.

There were 26,168 housing units, of which 11.7% were vacant. The homeowner vacancy rate was 2.2% and the rental vacancy rate was 8.5%.

Racial composition as of the 2020 census
Race	Number	Percent
White	14,858	27.3%
Black or African American	34,648	63.8%
American Indian and Alaska Native	333	0.6%
Asian	765	1.4%
Native Hawaiian and Other Pacific Islander	29	0.1%
Some other race	1,656	3.0%
Two or more races	2,052	3.8%
Hispanic or Latino (of any race)	2,672	4.9%

=== 2010 census ===
At the 2010 census, there were 57,477 people, 23,097 households, and 14,639 families residing in the city. The population density was 1,312.6 inhabitants per square mile (506.8 inhabitants/km^{2}). The city had 26,953 housing units. The racial makeup of the city was 61.3% Black, 32.4% White, 0.6% Native American, 1.0% Asian, and 1.6% from two or more races. Hispanics or Latinos of any race were 3.7% of the population.

Of the 23,097 households, 27.3% had children under the age of 18 living with them, 35.7% were married couples living together, 22.9% had a female householder with no husband present, and 36.6% were not families. About 31.4% of all households were made up of individuals living alone, and 26.6% had someone living alone who was 65 years of age or older. The average household size was 2.42 and the average family size was 3.04.

In the city, the population was distributed as 27.5% between the ages of 1 and 19, 6.4% from 20 to 24, 24% from 25 to 44, 27.9% from 45 to 64, and 14.2% who were 65 years of age or older. The median age is 38.7 years. 45.8% of the population are males compared to 54.2% for females.

The median income for a household in the city was $37,059, and for a family was $39,929. The per capita income for the city was $21,779. About 19.0% of the population is below the poverty line.

=== Religion ===
Rocky Mount's population is 40.3% religiously affiliated, below the state average of 48.9%. Christianity is the largest religion, with Baptists (13.3%) making up the largest religious group, followed by Pentecostals (4.5%) and Methodists (3.5%). Presbyterians (1.5%), Episcopalians (0.9%), and Catholics (0.8%) make up a significant amount of the Christian population as well. The remaining Christian population (15.2%) is affiliated with other churches. Islam (0.5%) has the second-largest percentage of adherents after the total for Christian sects.

== Economy ==
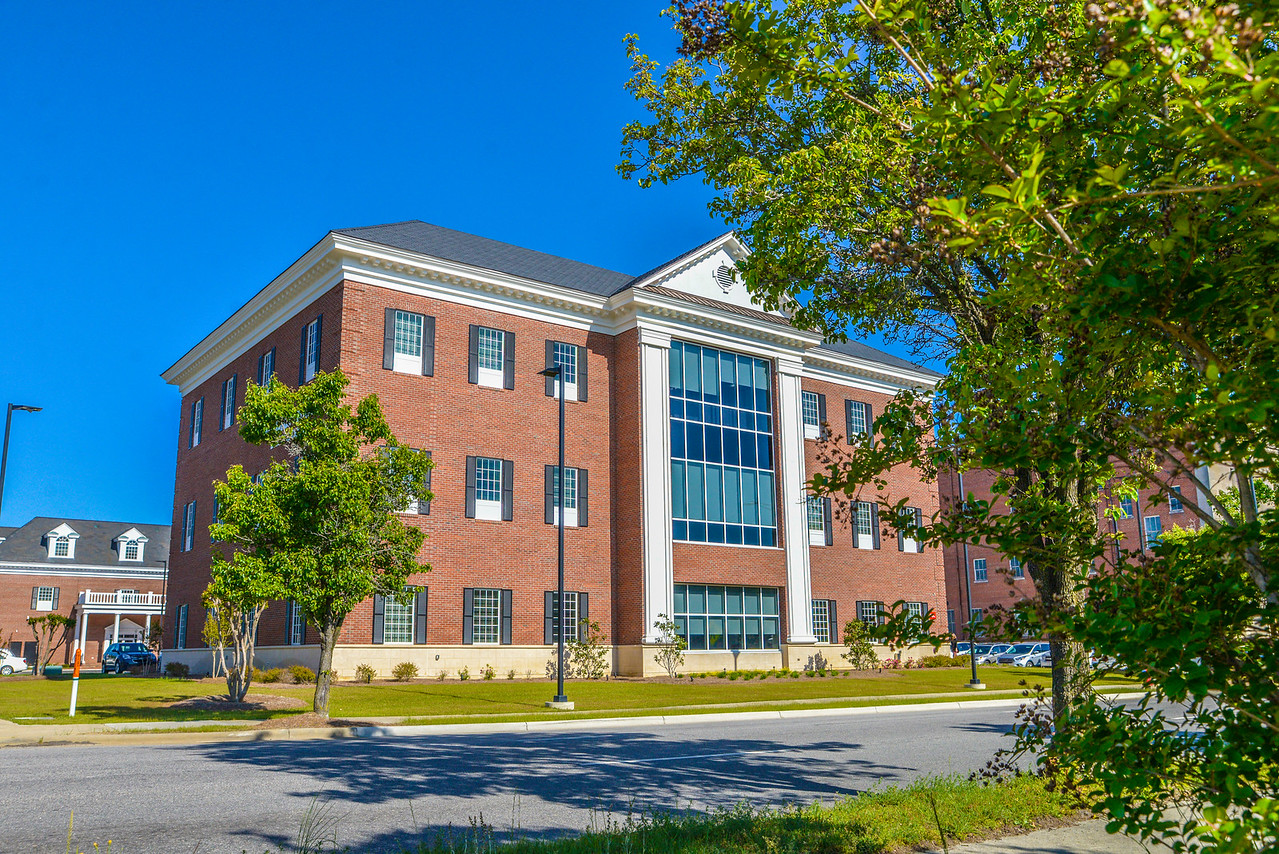
Southern Bank Business Center in downtown Rocky Mount

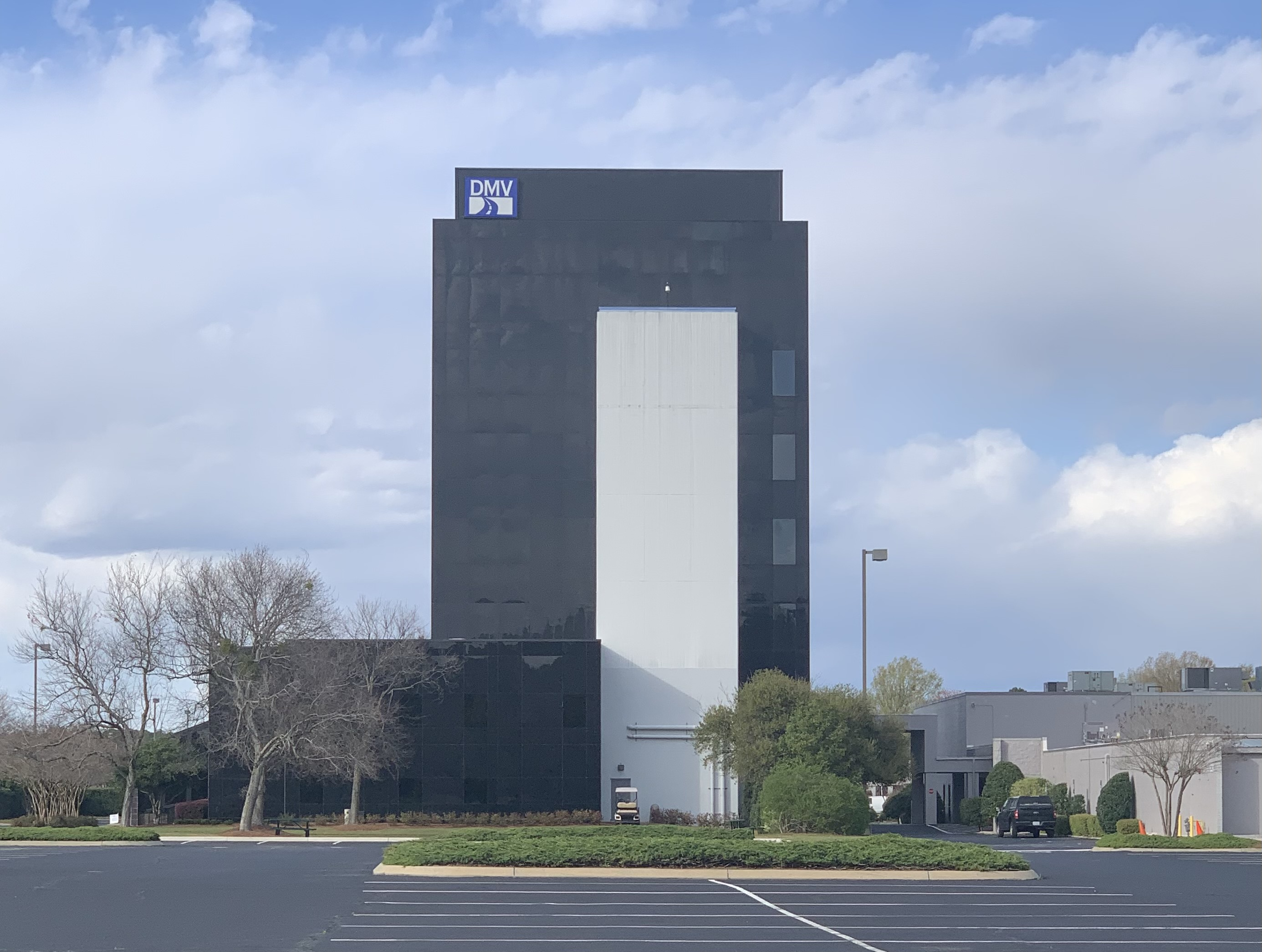
North Carolina Division of Motor Vehicles headquarters

The economy of the Rocky Mount metropolitan area, historically dependent on agriculture and textile manufacturing, has diversified into pharmaceuticals and manufacturing. As the city is located near the juncture of a number of highways and railway, distribution and logistics are important to local businesses. The area has a strong service sector and a number of financial and customer support centers are located here.

Rocky Mount is located 45 mi (72 km) from the state capital Raleigh and the associated Research Triangle. This has helped attract new companies to Rocky Mount seeking skilled labor and a lower costs of living and doing business.

The metropolitan area was named in a 2020 study as the third-highest in the United States where manufacturing is thriving, with a manufacturing output of $6.2 billion, or $42,270 per capita. Between 2014 and 2018, manufacturing grew in the Rocky Mount area by 11.8%, and there were 108% more manufacturing jobs than the national average.

In 2019, CSX Transportation began construction of a $200 million cargo terminal in Rocky Mount.

=== Largest employers ===
Below is a list of some of the largest employers in the metropolitan area as of 2018.

#	Employer	No. of employees
1	Pfizer	3,200
2	Nash-Rocky Mount Public Schools	2,275
3	Cummins–Rocky Mount Engine Plant	1,800
4	Nash UNC Health Care	1,600
5	Edgecombe County Public Schools	1,100
6	QVC Distribution center	1,100
7	CenturyLink	1,000
8	Sara Lee Frozen Bakery	950
9	Alorica	885
10	City of Rocky Mount	850

=== Shopping ===
Rocky Mount is a regional shopping destination with many big-box retailers and specialty shops located in the city. Rocky Mount's shopping centers are generally congregated along and around US 301 (Wesleyan Boulevard). Two examples are Golden East Crossing and Englewood Square.

In the downtown, the Douglas Block is a commercial area that was a former African-American business district. Station Square is a shopping area located next to city hall and the train station.

== Arts and culture ==
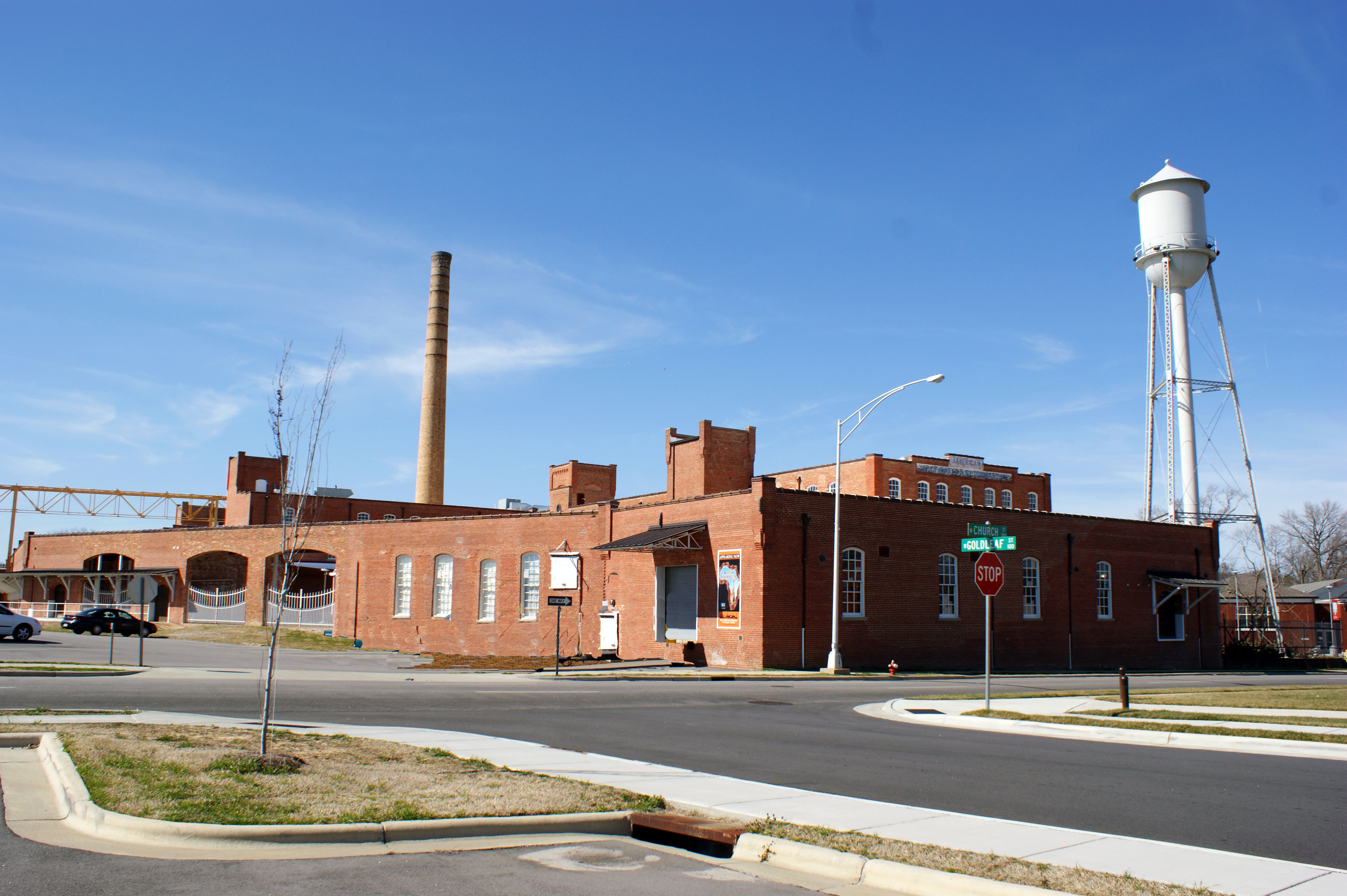
Imperial Centre for the Arts and Sciences

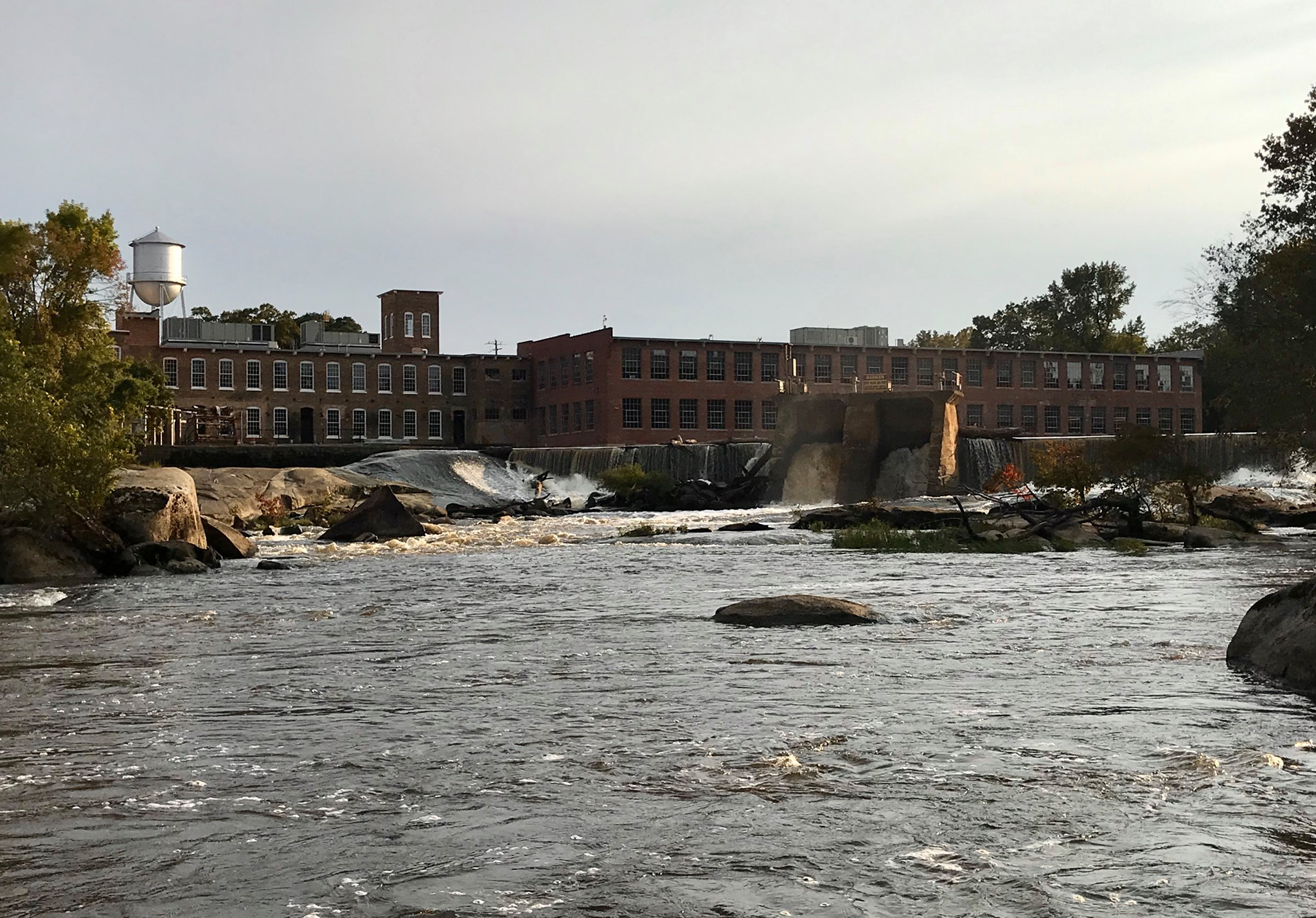
Historic Rocky Mount Mills

The city is home to multiple venues for the performing arts. The Imperial Centre for the Arts and Sciences hosts the Maria V. Howard Arts Center, a Children's Museum and Science Center, and a community theater. The Dunn Center for the Performing Arts at Wesleyan College regularly has college arts performances and touring acts, and is also the home of the Tar River Orchestra and Chorus. Most recently, the Rocky Mount Event Center opened in downtown with space for up to 5,000 seats for entertainment and sporting events.

Rocky Mount Mills is a craft brewery incubator, the first of its kind on North Carolina. It now holds many up-and-coming breweries and restaurants. In addition, the mill hosts summer music festivals and other events throughout the year. Since 2014 it has been in redevelopment by Capitol Broadcasting Company, which also owns the popular American Tobacco campus in downtown Durham, North Carolina. Nearby are dozens of historical homes for rent in the Rocky Mount Mills Village. The next phase of development is Goat Island on the Tar River, which will offer public access to hiking trails, sandy beaches, and rafting/canoeing.

A Rocky Mount Railroad Museum has been in the planning stages for a number of years. The railroad was basic to the city's development: in the early to mid-1900s the Emerson Shops of the Atlantic Coast Line Railroad employed more than 2,000 people. The museum organizers are seeking a suitable facility. It has been proposed for location inside the train station.

=== National Register of Historic Places ===
The area includes individually recognized properties, such as the Bellamy-Philips House, Bellemonte, Benvenue, Machaven, The Meadows, Rocky Mount Electric Power Plant, Rocky Mount Mills, and Stonewall.

It also has numerous recognized districts: Edgemont Historic District, Falls Road Historic District, Lincoln Park Historic District, Rocky Mount Central City Historic District, Rocky Mount Mills Village Historic District, Villa Place Historic District, and West Haven Historic District; all are listed on the National Register of Historic Places.

== Parks and recreation ==
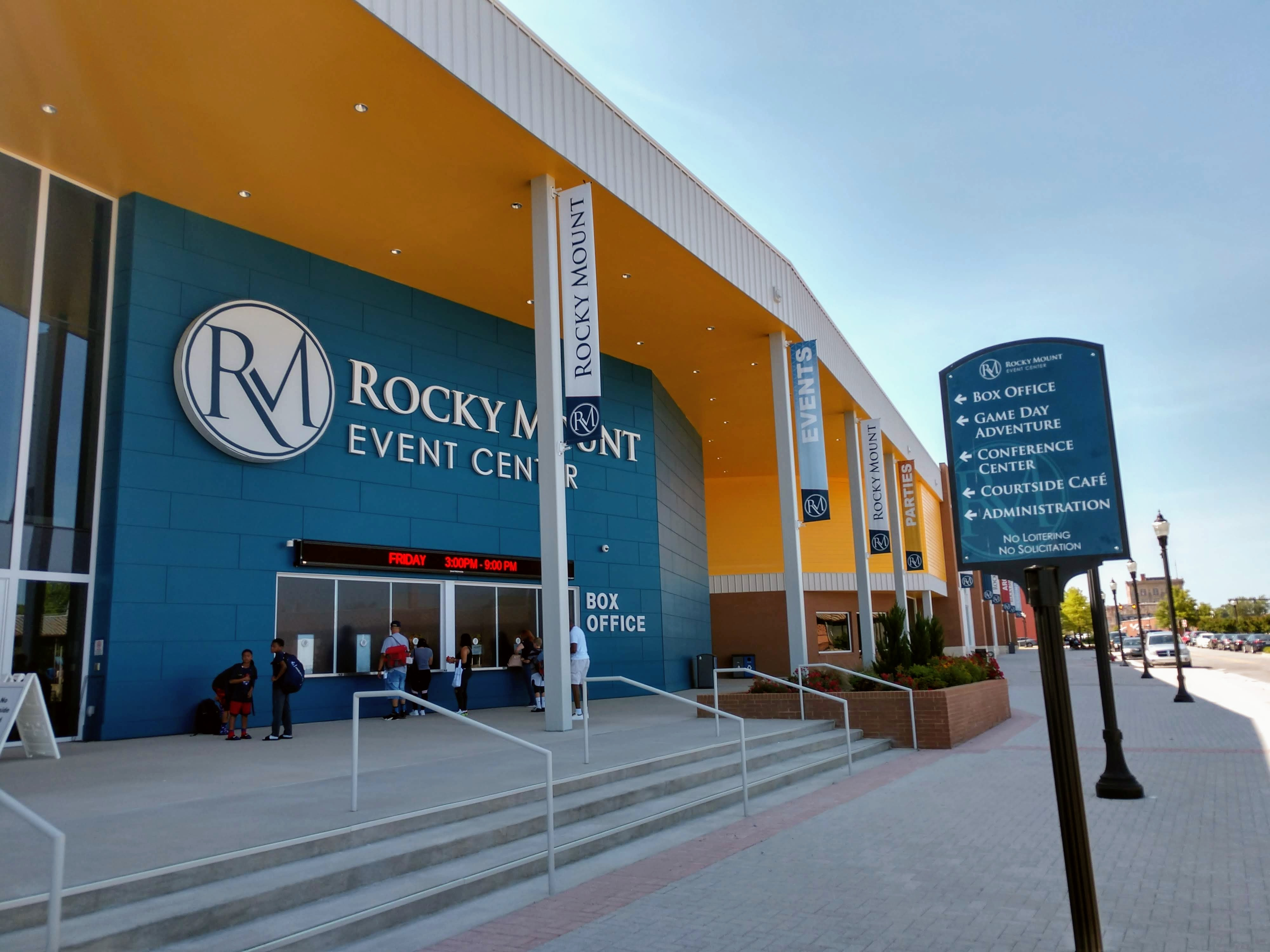
Rocky Mount Event Center in downtown Rocky Mount

Rocky Mount is a major center for youth sports tourism, as it is a midpoint between New York and Florida along I-95. The Rocky Mount Sports Complex, maintained by the Parks and Recreation department, includes seven outdoor baseball fields, four softball fields, eight soccer fields, a professional disc golf course, basketball courts, and volleyball courts. The complex is used for numerous statewide and interstate baseball and soccer tournaments.

It also has a football stadium, home to the NCWC Battling Bishops football team and Elizabeth City State University's annual Down East Viking Classic. The Rocky Mount Event Center administered by the city has added eight indoor basketball courts, sixteen volleyball courts, a ropes course, a climbing wall, and a family entertainment center, with plans to host indoor basketball, volleyball, and gymnastics competitions.

Tar River Trail is a 7-mile (11 km) greenway running east to west along the namesake river that connects with multiple parks, city landmarks, and the sports complex. There are designated boat ramps for access to recreational paddling trips on the river. Notable among the connected parks is City Lake Park, built in 1937 during the Great Depression by the Works Progress Administration, and the 57-acre (23 ha) biodiverse Battle Park centered on the falls of the Tar River. The trail also includes a 220-foot (67 m) long, clear-span, wooden bridge, believed to be the longest such wooden bridge in the United States.

== Government ==
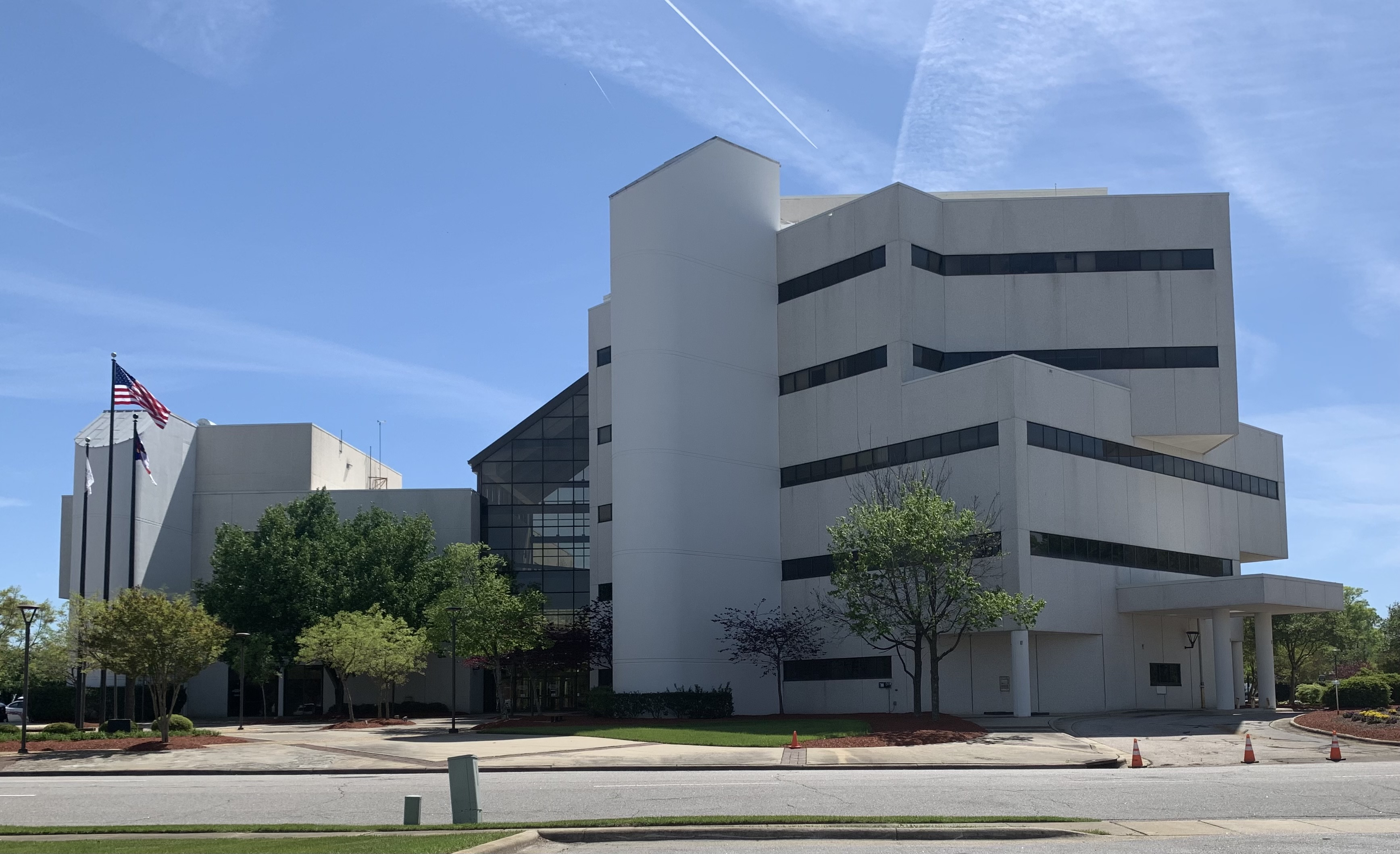
Frederick E. Turnage Municipal Building in downtown Rocky Mount

The city of Rocky Mount has a council-manager form of government. The city is divided into seven wards with a total of seven council members elected to the city council, one from each ward. Members of the city council serve four-year terms with staggered elections every two years, while the mayor is elected at-large by citizens and serves a four-year term. The mayor is ex officio chair of the city council and votes only in case of a tie. The council appoints a city manager to serve as chief administrative officer of day-to-day affairs of government. As of 2022, the current city manager is Peter Varney.

Since the city straddles the Nash County-Edgecombe County border, the commissions of both counties are also involved in governance of the city.

=== City council ===
- Sandy Roberson (Mayor)
- Andre Knight (Ward 1)
- Reuben C. Blackwell, IV (Ward 2)
- Richard Joyner (Ward 3)
- T. J. Walker (Ward 4)
- Lige Daughtridge (Ward 5)
- Tom Harris (Ward 6)
- Jabaris Walker (Ward 7)

== Education ==
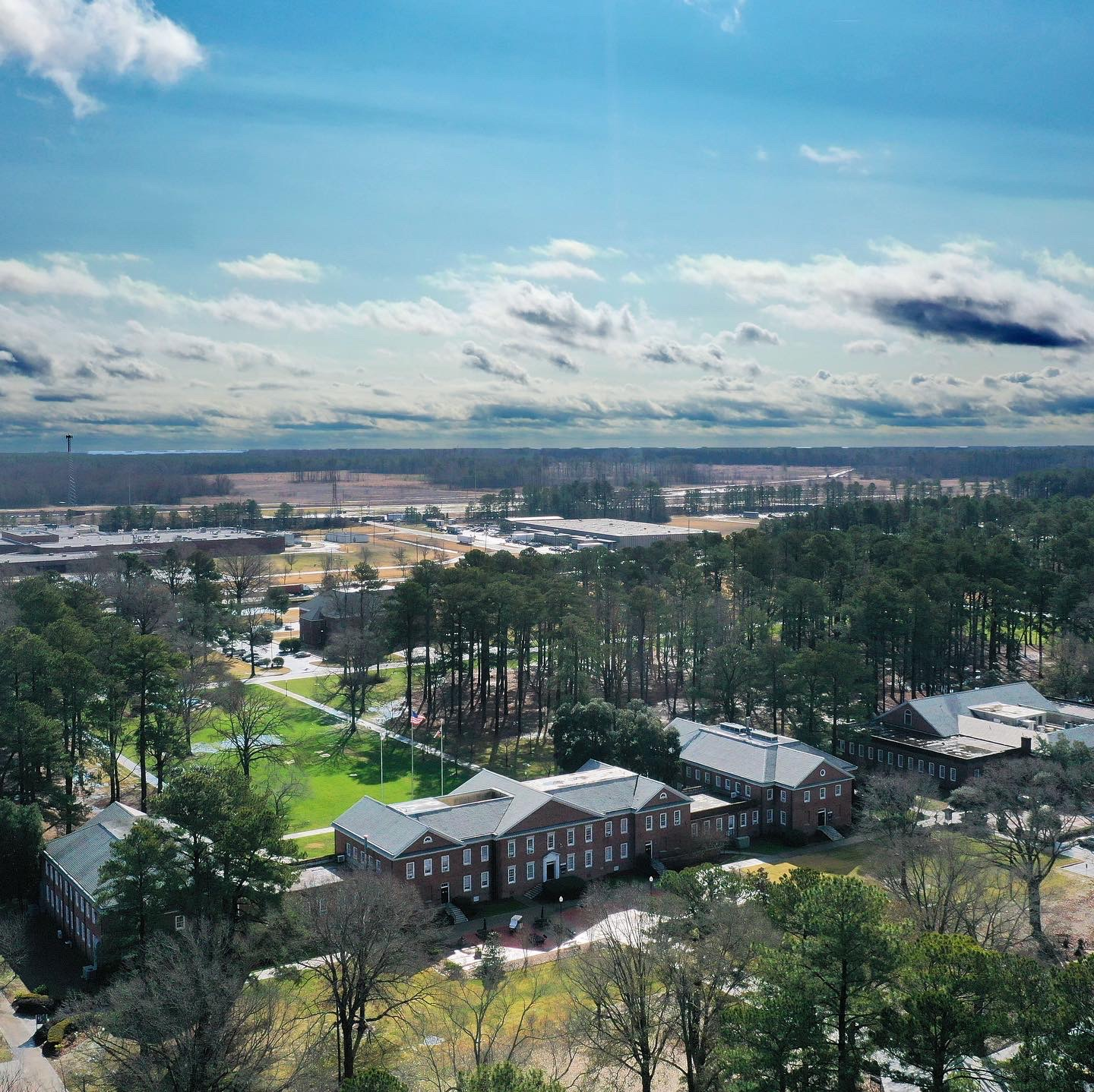
Aerial view of North Carolina Wesleyan University campus

North Carolina Wesleyan University is a four-year private liberal arts college located in Rocky Mount and home to the Eastern North Carolina Center for Business and Entrepreneurship. The center's programs are free, open to the public, and focus on business development, entrepreneurship, and community engagement.

The city is also served by Nash Community College, which has a brewing, distillation, and fermentation program in partnership with the Mills. Edgecombe Community College has a downtown campus specializing in biotechnology and medical simulation, one of only two such centers in the state. Shaw University's College of Adult and Professional Education (C.A.P.E.) has a satellite campus in Mills Village.

The city of Rocky Mount is primarily served by the Nash-Rocky Mount Public School System, which as a whole has 15,000 students in 28 schools. Parts of the city in Edgecombe County are also served by the Edgecombe County Public Schools system. Public high schools include Nash Central High School, Northern Nash High School, Rocky Mount High School, Southwest Edgecombe High School and Southern Nash High School.

Three non-traditional public schools are Tar River Academy, The Center for Industry Technology and Innovation and its sister school, the Nash Rocky Mount Early College. The one local charter school is Rocky Mount Preparatory School. There are also a number of private schools in the area.

Braswell Memorial Library serves the community as its major public library with affiliated libraries throughout the Twin Counties. It recently became part of the State Library's NC Cardinal consortium of public libraries. These share an integrated system allowing books and other materials to be checked out from other libraries across the state.

== Media ==
Rocky Mount is considered part of the Raleigh-Durham-Fayetteville television and radio media market, the 25th largest in the United States. However, multiple broadcast stations in the Greenville-New Bern-Washington market also cover the city.

Locally, WHIG-TV, founded in 1997 and now hosted at Wesleyan College, and WNCR-LD, founded in 2002 and located in downtown, are Rocky Mount's community television stations. WRQM 90.9 FM is the repeater station of public radio station WUNC, the local NPR affiliate. In the 1990s, it was known as "Down East Radio" and also hosted at Wesleyan College.

The Rocky Mount Telegram serves as the main daily newspaper for the city of Rocky Mount and surrounding areas.

== Infrastructure ==
=== Transportation ===
==== Roads and highways ====
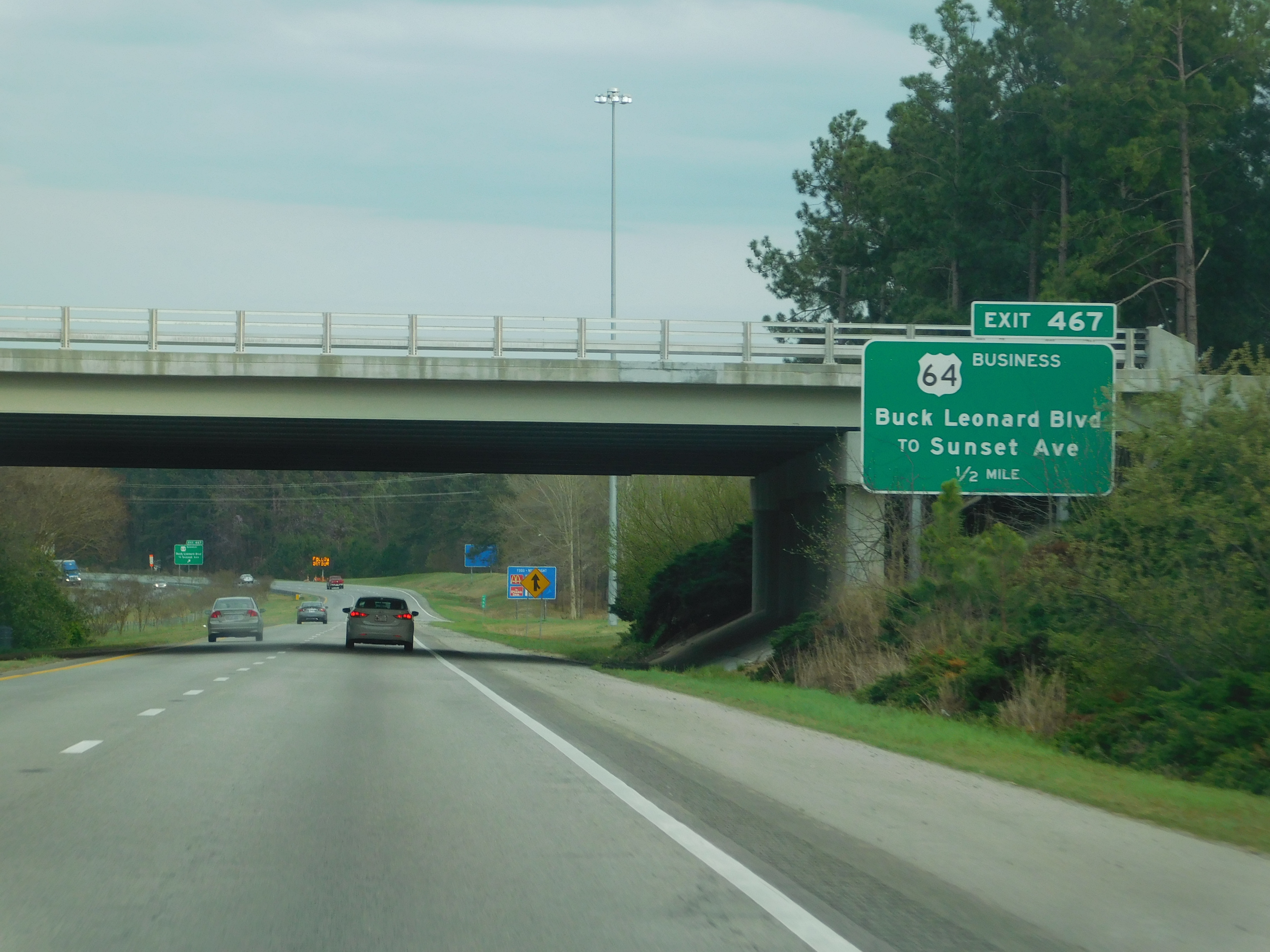
US 64 is the city's main east–west corridor

The city is served by three major highways:

- I-95 to its west.
- US 64 (Future I-87) as its main east–west corridor.
- US 301 (Wesleyan Boulevard) as its main north–south corridor.

In the downtown area, both US 64 Bus. (Sunset Avenue / Thomas Street) and US 301 Bus. (Church Street) serve as major thoroughfares. State highways NC 4, NC 43, NC 48 and NC 97 serve the city by connecting to nearby towns.

==== Airports ====
The Rocky Mount–Wilson Regional Airport (IATA: RWI, ICAO: KRWI, FAA LID: RWI) serves the general aviation needs of the surrounding counties. It is on NC 97, 9 miles (14 km) southwest of downtown Rocky Mount. The closest airport with scheduled commercial service is Pitt–Greenville Airport (PGV), 40 miles (64 km) to the southeast. Cargo and charter flights in the area also use the Kinston Regional Jetport (ISO), 50 miles (80 km) to the south. Raleigh-Durham International Airport (RDU), is 74 miles (119 km) to the west.

==== Rail ====
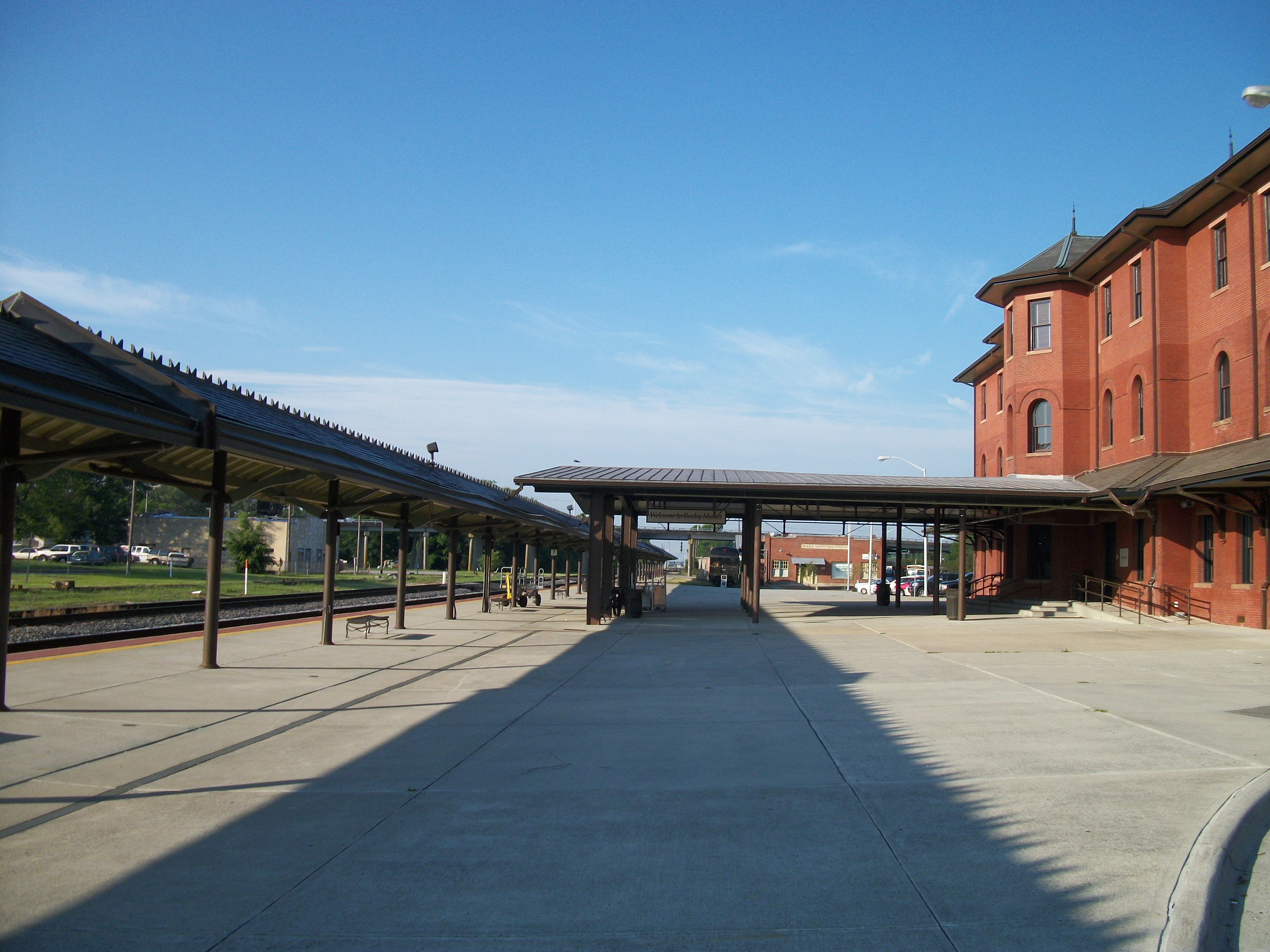
Helen P. Gay Rocky Mount Historic Train Station in downtown, originally built in 1893.

Amtrak provides three north and three southbound trains per day at the Rocky Mount station located in downtown. Service is to Washington, D.C., New York City, Miami and Philadelphia. Freight service is provided by CSX. Trains travel to destinations in eastern North Carolina and also to points west and south of the city.

==== Public transit ====
Tar River Transit provides public transportation in and around the city of Rocky Mount, and operates 10 fixed bus routes throughout the city.

=== Health care ===
Nash UNC Health Care is a non-profit hospital affiliated with UNC Health Care, which it joined in 2014. It has 345 beds at four different locations. Its flagship facility is Nash General Hospital. When Nash General opened in 1971, it consolidated four different hospitals in the Rocky Mount area, and was the first all-private-room hospital in North Carolina. Other hospitals operated are Nash Day Hospital, Bryant T. Aldridge Rehabilitation Center, and Coastal Plain Hospital. Nash UNC has added more facilities in recent years: a Surgery Pavilion in 2004, a renovated Emergency Department and Nash Heart Center in 2014, and Nash Women's Center in 2016. In 2018, the Danny Talbott Cancer Center facility opened, named in honor of a Rocky Mount athletic legend and cancer survivor.

== Notable people ==
- Andrew B. Anderson Jr., U.S. Air Force lieutenant general and chief of staff, born in Rocky Mount
- Lloyd W. Bailey, faithless elector in the 1968 Presidential election
- Thurbert Baker, the first African-American Attorney General in the State of Georgia born in Rocky Mount
- F. C. Barnes, gospel musician born in Rocky Mount
- Luther Barnes, gospel music producer born in Rocky Mount
- Gardner Bishop, barber and civil rights activist, born in Rocky Mount
- Herman Boone, coach depicted by Denzel Washington in Remember the Titans, born in Rocky Mount
- Jim Boyd, Olympic gold medalist light heavyweight boxer at the 1956 Summer Olympics
- Benjamin Bunn, former U.S. congressman and first mayor of Rocky Mount, lived in historic Benvenue
- Jim Clack, NFL football player who won two Super Bowl championships with the Pittsburgh Steelers, born in Rocky Mount
- Jeff Collins, former member of the North Carolina General Assembly
- Pell Cooper, North Carolina District Court judge
- Roy Cooper, governor of North Carolina
- Elijah L. Daughtridge, 12th lieutenant governor of North Carolina, born in Rocky Mount
- Harold Denton, nuclear physicist, born in Rocky Mount, who advised the President during the Three Mile Island accident
- Harold Bascom Durham Jr., recipient of the Medal of Honor for his actions in the Vietnam War
- Mike Easley, former governor of North Carolina and state attorney general, born in Rocky Mount
- Phil Ford, UNC and NBA basketball player, born in Rocky Mount
- Jim Gardner, businessman and politician, former U.S. congressman and lieutenant governor, who co-founded Hardee's in the city
- Maureen Garrett, soap opera actress born in Rocky Mount
- Alberta Gay, mother of Marvin Gaye, born in Rocky Mount
- Kaye Gibbons, novelist who attended Rocky Mount Senior High School and wrote Ellen Foster
- Billy Godwin, former head baseball coach for East Carolina University born in Rocky Mount
- Brian Goodwin, MLB baseball player for the Pittsburgh Pirates
- Allan Gurganus, author who wrote Oldest Living Confederate Widow Tells All born in Rocky Mount
- Bill Harrison, former CEO and chairman of JPMorgan Chase born in Rocky Mount
- Damariscotta Helm, international whistling champion
- Matt Hill, electric blues musician born in Rocky Mount
- Chuck Hinton, MLB baseball player born in Rocky Mount
- Earle Hyman, actor born in Rocky Mount who portrayed Cliff's father on The Cosby Show
- Terrence J, actor and co-anchor of E! News lived in Rocky Mount and attended nearby Northern Nash High School
- Jack Kerouac, father of the Beat Generation who resided with family off and on and referred to city as "Testament, Virginia" in On the Road
- Kay Kyser, big band musician, radio and film personality born in Rocky Mount
- Buck Leonard, Negro league baseball player; member of the National Baseball Hall of Fame
- Westray Battle Long, second director of Women's Army Corps under Dwight D. Eisenhower during World War II born in Rocky Mount
- Bill Mathis, American Football League football player who was a running back for the New York Jets
- Mae Mercer, Blues singer, actress and producer born in annexed former town of Battleboro
- Thelonious Monk, jazz pianist born in Rocky Mount
- William Murray, former football player and head coach at Duke University born in Rocky Mount
- Vann R. Newkirk II, journalist and staff writer for The Atlantic born in Rocky Mount
- Thomas J. Pearsall, attorney, politician, and philanthropist. He was the main instigator of the Pearsall Plan and was a co-founder of North Carolina Wesleyan College.
- Charles Pittman, NBA basketball player born in Rocky Mount
- Chuck Robbins, CEO of Cisco Systems who attended Rocky Mount High School
- Etaf Rum, The New York Times best-selling author of A Woman is No Man who lives in Rocky Mount
- Susie Sharp, first female North Carolina Supreme Court justice born in Rocky Mount
- Don Stallings, NFL football player who played for the Washington Redskins and for the University of North Carolina in college
- Danny Talbott, UNC and NFL quarterback who led Rocky Mount High School to state championships in football, basketball, and baseball
- Ken Thompson, former CEO and chairman of Wachovia born in Rocky Mount
- Jim Thorpe, NFL and MLB player, two-time Olympic gold medalist, played minor league baseball for the Rocky Mount Railroaders
- Mike Tyson, MLB baseball player born in Rocky Mount
- Phil Valentine, talk show radio host was born in Rocky Mount but grew up in nearby Nashville
- Tim Valentine, former U.S. congressman born in Rocky Mount
- Harold Vick, jazz musician known for his work in the film School Daze (1988) born in Rocky Mount
- Buck Williams, NBA basketball player born in Rocky Mount
- Mary Elizabeth Winstead, Emmy Award winning actress born in Rocky Mount
- Adrian H. Wood, educator and blogger who was born and raised in Rocky Mount

== See also ==
- List of municipalities in North Carolina
- Rocky Mount Pines, a former minor-league baseball team of the Carolina League
- List of U.S. communities with African-American majority populations
