= Rocky Mount High School =

American public school in North Carolina

Location
- 1400 Bethlehem Road; Rocky Mount, North Carolina 27803; United States; 35°56′31″N 77°48′29″W

Information
- School type: Public
- Established: 1927 (99 years ago)
- School district: Nash Public Schools
- CEEB code: 343375
- Principal: Daniel Colvin
- Teaching staff: 63.03 (FTE)
- Grades: 9–12
- Enrollment: 997 (2023-2024)
- Student to teacher ratio: 15.82
- Colors: Navy blue and gold
- Nickname: Gryphons
- Website: rockymounths.ncpschools.net

Rocky Mount High School is a public high school in Rocky Mount, North Carolina. Established in 1927, the school is a part of the Nash County Public Schools district.

== History ==
Public education in Rocky Mount began in 1901. High school programs were established in the following years, but did not have their own buildings until 1915, when the high school department of the Rocky Mount Graded Schools for White Children took over Edgemont School on Cokey Road and it became Edgemont High School. In 1927, with the construction of Booker T. Washington High School for Black students on Virginia Street and the new Rocky Mount High School for White students on Marigold Street, both races had separate, self-contained high school campuses. The (All-White) Rocky Mount High School moved to a new campus on Tillery Street in 1953 and changed its name from Rocky Mount High to Rocky Mount Senior High. Voluntary integration began in the early 1960s, when the first Black students chose to attend Rocky Mount Senior High School under the Freedom of Choice law. A small Black student population was maintained at Rocky Mount Senior High until the two schools were merged in 1969. The merger took place in enlarged facilities on the Rocky Mount Senior High campus. The old mascots, the Blackbirds and the Lions, were retired and the student body voted to adopt a new, combined mascot: the Gryphons (Griffins)—mythological beasts that were part bird and part lion—chosen from a list of student-submitted names. The former Lions' school colors of royal blue and gold and the Blackbird's former school colors of black and gold were also blended to form the new school's colors of blue/black (a dark navy) and gold. In this manner the two schools further cemented their union into a single entity. The school officially returned to its older Rocky Mount High School name in 2004.

== Demographics ==
The demographic breakdown of the 1,310 students enrolled in 2013–14 was:

- Male – 48.1%
- Female – 51.9%
- Native American/Alaskan – 0.7%
- Asian/Pacific islanders – 1.4%
- Black – 71.8%
- Hispanic – 4.0 %
- White – 17.3%
- Multiracial – 4.8%

67.7% of the students were eligible for free or reduced lunch.

== Campus ==
In February 2010, the Nash-Rocky Mount Board of Education and the Nash County Commissioners combined to fund the building of a new campus for Rocky Mount High School.

The 240,000 square foot, $32 million facility has been completed on a near 61-acre (250,000 m^{2}) parcel on the north side of Bethlehem Road—between West Mount Drive and Old Mill Road. The school's address is 1400 Bethlehem Road.

The school officially moved to the new campus on July 10, 2012, and it will open for students in August.

For the first time ever, Rocky Mount High School will field all of its sports programs on-campus, including football, baseball, and track & field.

The school was previously located at 308 S. Tillery Street and was opened in September 1953. Set on just 24 acres (97,000 m^{2}) of land, it was bordered by S. Tillery St. to the east, Hammond St. to the south and Nash St. to the north.

== Curriculum ==
Rocky Mount High School offers the IB Diploma Programme which has been available to students since 1999 and also offers Advanced Placement courses.

Rocky Mount High School integrated technology into its common core curriculum during the 2013–2014 academic school year after implementing the one-to-one initiative.

== Extracurricular activities ==
=== Athletics ===
Rocky Mount High has had several successful athletic teams and has won the following North Carolina High School Athletic Association (NCHSAA) team state championships:

- Baseball: 1963 (4A), 1967 (4A), 1973 (4A), 1980 (4A), 2008 (3A)
- Boys Basketball: 1963 (4A), 1978 (4A), 1982 (4A), 2010 (3A), 2012 (3A)
- Football: 1962 (4A), 1963 (4A), 2015 (3A)

The football team played its games at the Rocky Mount Athletic Complex from 1988 until 2011.

=== Marching band ===
The Rocky Mount High School marching band was a finalist at the Bands of America (BOA) National Championship in 1981, 1982, 1983, 1984, and 1986, and was the Grand Champion at the BOA National Championship in 1983, 1984, and 1986. The marching band was the Grand Champion at BOA regional championships in Cullowhee, North Carolina (1983), Johnson City, Tennessee (1984), and Morgantown, West Virginia (1985, 1986, 1987).

== Notable alumni ==
- Jim Clack – NFL offensive lineman, won two Super Bowls with the Pittsburgh Steelers
- Mike Easley – 72nd governor of North Carolina
- Phil Ford – NBA player, 3x All-American for UNC, No. 12 retired by UNC
- Kaye Gibbons – award-winning novelist
- Brian Goodwin – MLB outfielder
- Allan Gurganus – award-winning writer and artist, Guggenheim fellow
- Kay Kyser – bandleader and radio personality
- William D. Murray – American football player and coach
- Chuck Robbins – CEO of Cisco Systems
- Tom Smith – award-winning musician, Jazz Education Hall of Fame
- Don Stallings – NFL defensive lineman
- Danny Talbott – professional football and baseball player
- Buck Williams – NBA player, 3x All-Star selection, No. 52 retired by the Brooklyn Nets
