= Braswell Memorial Library =

Library in North Carolina

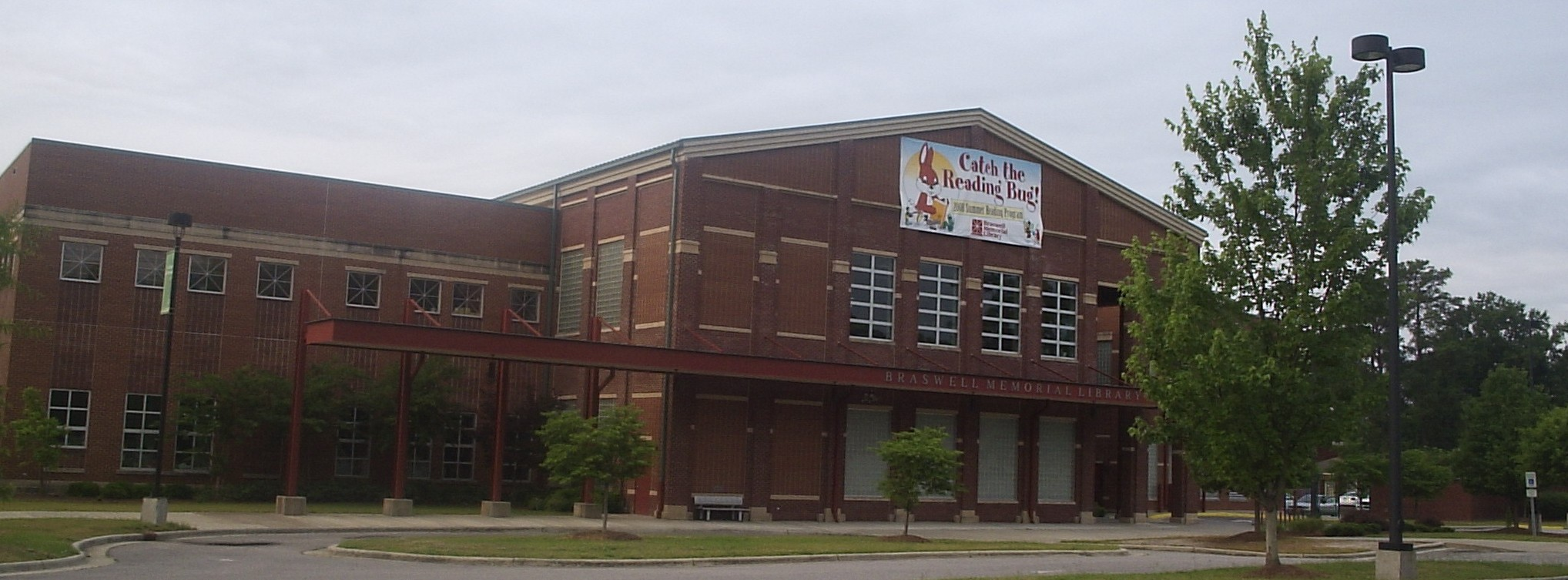
- 35°56′59.8″N 77°47′48.6″W
- Location: Rocky Mount, North Carolina, USA
- Type: Public
- Established: 1922

Other information
- Director: Melissa Corso
- Website: braswell-library.libguides.com

Braswell Memorial Public Library is a public library in Rocky Mount, North Carolina. Initially organized as the Woman's Club Library in 1922, in 1923 the library moved into the building which bore the name The Thomas Hackney Braswell Memorial Library. In 2002, the library moved across the street into a new 60,000 square foot facility, and assumed a new identity as an interlocal governmental entity - created and funded by the City of Rocky Mount, Nash County, and Edgecombe County. It is affiliated with and provides administrative support to 5 other local libraries. Recently, it joined the State Library's NC Cardinal consortium of public libraries that share an online catalog and integrated library system that allows it to share books and other materials with member libraries.

== History ==
Nell Gupton Battle was the first director of Braswell Memorial Library upon being established in 1922 and remained in the position until 1943. After her retirement, Ruth Oliver Jeffries served as director until 1979. Catherine Roche served as the director of Braswell Memorial Library from 2014 until her retirement in 2023. Tikela Alston assumed the role of director in May 2023, until her resignation in April 2024. Melissa Corso then entered the director role as interim, later becoming director officially in November 2024.

== Other Locations ==
- Bailey Public Library (Wesley Privette Memorial) in Bailey, North Carolina
- Harold D. Cooley Library in Nashville, North Carolina (affiliated but independently administered)
- Middlesex Public Library in Middlesex, North Carolina
- Spring Hope Public Library in Spring Hope, North Carolina
- Whitakers Public Library in Whitakers, North Carolina
