= National Register of Historic Places listings in Edgecombe County, North Carolina =

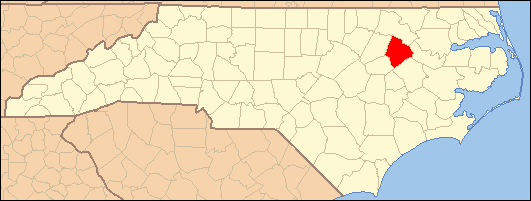

This list includes properties and districts listed on the National Register of Historic Places in Edgecombe County, North Carolina, United States. Click the "Map of all coordinates" link to the right to view an online map of all properties and districts with latitude and longitude coordinates in the table below.

This National Park Service list is complete through NPS recent listings posted September 4, 2026.

	Name on the Register	Image	Date listed	Location	City or town	Description
1	The Barracks		February 18, 1971 (#71000578)	1100 Albemarle Ave. 35°54′08″N 77°32′30″W	Tarboro	
2	Batts House and Outbuildings		April 5, 2006 (#06000226)	E side of US 258 N, 2.05 miles S of NC 1513 5098 US 258 N 35°56′44″N 77°29′55″W	Tarboro	
3	Bracebridge Hall		February 18, 1971 (#71000579)	Macclesfield vicinity; also 7714 Colonial Rd. and both sides of Colonial Rd. at its junction with Carr Farm Rd. 35°45′40″N 77°32′36″W	Macclesfield	Second set of boundaries represents a boundary increase of December 16, 2005
4	C.S.S. Col. Hill (side-wheel steamer)		August 24, 2018 (#100002803)	Address restricted	Tarboro	
5	Calvary Episcopal Church and Churchyard	Calvary Episcopal Church and Churchyard	February 18, 1971 (#71000580)	411 E. Church St. 35°53′51″N 77°31′56″W	Tarboro	
6	Cedar Lane		April 15, 1982 (#82003451)	N of Tarboro off NC 44; 35°59′05″N 77°30′32″W	Leggett	
7	Coats House		April 3, 1973 (#73001339)	1503 St. Andrews St. 35°54′25″N 77°32′19″W	Tarboro	
8	Coolmore Plantation	Coolmore Plantation	February 18, 1971 (#71000581)	Rte. 3 (W of Tarboro on U.S. 64); 35°55′26″N 77°35′40″W	Tarboro	
9	Cotton Press	Cotton Press	February 18, 1971 (#71000582)	Town Common; 35°53′53″N 77°32′39″W	Tarboro	
10	Eastern Star Baptist Church		April 2, 1980 (#80002827)	Church and Wagner Sts. 35°53′36″N 77°31′50″W	Tarboro	
11	Edgecombe Agricultural Works		April 2, 1980 (#80002828)	Roughly bounded by Main, Howard, Albemarle, and Walnut Sts. 35°54′18″N 77°32′27″W	Tarboro	
12	Edgecombe County Home Historic District		September 8, 2026 (#100013391)	3003 North Main Street; 35°55′28″N 77°33′31″W	Tarboro	
13	Edgemont Historic District		November 12, 1999 (#99001365)	500-800 blocks of Tarboro St., the 600-800 blocks of Hill St., and the southern side of the 600-800 blocks of Sycamore St.; also roughly bounded by Cokey Rd., George St., Eastern Ave., Edgewood St., and School St. 35°56′10″N 77°47′19″W	Rocky Mount	Second set of boundaries represents a boundary increase of September 14, 2002
14	The Grove		February 18, 1971 (#71000583)	130 Bridgers St. 35°54′10″N 77°32′14″W	Tarboro	
15	Howell Homeplace		December 20, 1984 (#84000532)	SR 1517; 35°54′40″N 77°28′05″W	Tarboro	
16	Lincoln Park Historic District		January 20, 2012 (#11001042)	800 block of Ellison Dr., 800-900 & 1000-1002 Leggett Rd. & 800 Carver Pl. 35°57′15″N 77°46′45″W	Rocky Mount	
17	Lone Pine		November 6, 1987 (#87001901)	SR 1207, S of US 64; 35°54′48″N 77°36′09″W	Tarboro	
18	Mount Prospect		November 20, 1974 (#74001347)	Jct. of SR 1409 and SR 1428; 36°00′27″N 77°38′29″W	Leggett	Also known as Exum-Lewis House; burned
19	Dr. A. B. Nobles House and McKendree Church		June 19, 1980 (#80002825)	NW of Mercer on SR 1224; 35°52′12″N 77°39′26″W	Mercer	
20	Oakland Plantation		April 2, 1980 (#80002829)	Edmondson St. 35°53′47″N 77°32′27″W	Tarboro	
21	Old Town Plantation		December 1, 1983 (#72000961)	Off NC 97; 35°58′54″N 77°43′52″W	Battleboro	
22	Piney Prospect		February 18, 1971 (#71000584)	5.7 miles S of Tarboro off SR 1601; 35°48′49″N 77°34′01″W	Tarboro	
23	Porter Houses and Armstrong Kitchen		September 14, 2002 (#02000988)	821 Wells Rd. 36°03′55″N 77°40′01″W	Whitakers	
24	Princeville School	Princeville School	January 9, 2001 (#00001615)	US 258, 0.3 miles E of NC 64; 35°53′24″N 77°31′37″W	Princeville	
25	Quigless Clinic		October 27, 2000 (#00001232)	99 Main St. 35°53′40″N 77°31′58″W	Tarboro	
26	Railroad Depot Complex		April 2, 1980 (#80002830)	Off N. Main St. 35°54′23″N 77°32′32″W	Tarboro	
27	Redmond-Shackelford House		December 12, 1976 (#76001320)	300 Main St. 35°53′46″N 77°32′08″W	Tarboro	
28	Rocky Mount Central City Historic District		June 19, 1980 (#80002826)	Portions of 26 blocks on Main, Washington, Church, Battle, Hammond, Hill, Howard, Ivy, Gay, Goldleaf, and Thomas Sts. 35°56′32″N 77°47′42″W	Rocky Mount	Present boundaries reflect a boundary increase and decrease of August 27, 2009; original boundaries were "roughly bounded by Robinson and Atlantic Aves. and Holly and Franklin Sts." Extends into Nash County
29	William and Susan Savage House		August 25, 2014 (#14000518)	704 NC 97 E 35°59′42″N 77°34′11″W	Leggett	
30	St. John's Episcopal Church		February 18, 1971 (#71000577)	211 E. Battleboro Ave. 36°02′47″N 77°44′53″W	Battleboro	
31	St. Paul Baptist Church		April 2, 1980 (#80002831)	Edmondson St. 35°58′41″N 77°31′54″W	Tarboro	
32	Tarboro Historic District		April 2, 1980 (#80002832)	Roughly bounded by Albemarle Ave., Walnut, Panola, and Water Sts., and River Rd. 35°53′44″N 77°32′15″W	Tarboro	
33	Tarboro Town Common		September 30, 1970 (#70000453)	Bounded by Wilson St., Albemarle Ave., Park Ave. and St. Patrick St. 35°53′53″N 77°32′09″W	Tarboro	
34	Upper Town Creek Rural Historic District		August 29, 1986 (#86001656)	Roughly bounded by NC 1003, NC 1411, NC 1414, and Town Creek; 35°47′57″N 77°45′25″W	Wilson	
35	Vinedale		July 15, 1982 (#82003450)	SW of NC 42/43 and SR 1122; 35°46′50″N 77°36′21″W	Pinetops	
36	Walston-Bulluck House		February 18, 1971 (#71000585)	1018 St. Andrews St. 35°54′10″N 77°32′14″W	Tarboro	
37	F. D. Wharton House		April 9, 2025 (#100011659)	521 East Saint James Street; 35°53′59″N 77°31′45″W	Tarboro	
38	Wilkinson-Dozier House		October 23, 1974 (#74001348)	SE of Tarboro off SR 1524; 35°51′52″N 77°26′13″W	Conetoe	
39	Worsley-Burnette House		May 24, 1990 (#90000791)	SR 1526 N of jct. with SR 1540; 35°51′44″N 77°26′13″W	Conetoe	

== See also ==
- National Register of Historic Places listings in North Carolina
- List of National Historic Landmarks in North Carolina
