= Coats House =

Historic house in North Carolina, United States

- U.S. National Register of Historic Places
- U.S. Historic district – Contributing property
- Location within North Carolina Location within the United States
- Location: 1503 St. Andrews St., Tarboro, North Carolina
- Coordinates: 35°54′25″N 77°32′19″W
- Area: 3.5 acres (1.4 ha)
- Built: c. 1860
- Built by: Coats, Thomas H.
- Architectural style: English Cottage
- NRHP reference No.: 73001339
- Added to NRHP: April 3, 1973

Coats House is a historic home located at Tarboro, Edgecombe County, North Carolina. It was built about 1860, and is a two-story, three bays wide, English Cottage style brick dwelling. It features a hipped roof with wide, overhanging eaves and a cupola and four interior end chimneys. Also on the property are the contributing brick kitchen and a frame smokehouse. Its builder, Thomas H. Coats, also built the Calvary Episcopal Church and First Baptist Church in Raleigh, North Carolina.

It was listed on the National Register of Historic Places in 1973. It is located in the Tarboro Historic District.
