= Bryant W. Thorpe =

American politician

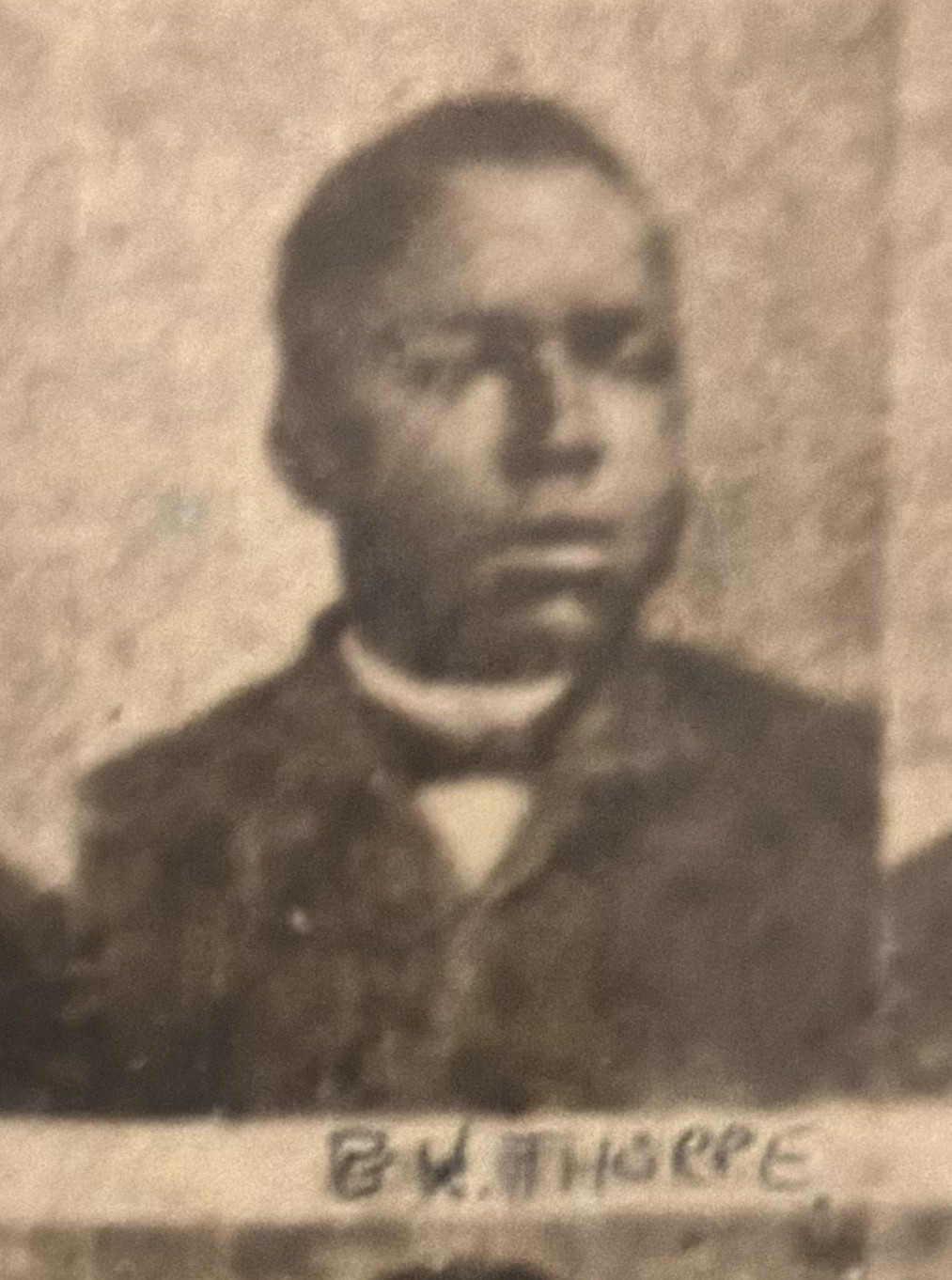
Bryant W. Thorpe

Bryant William Thorpe was a state legislator in North Carolina. He served in the North Carolina House of Representatives in 1885. He was African American.

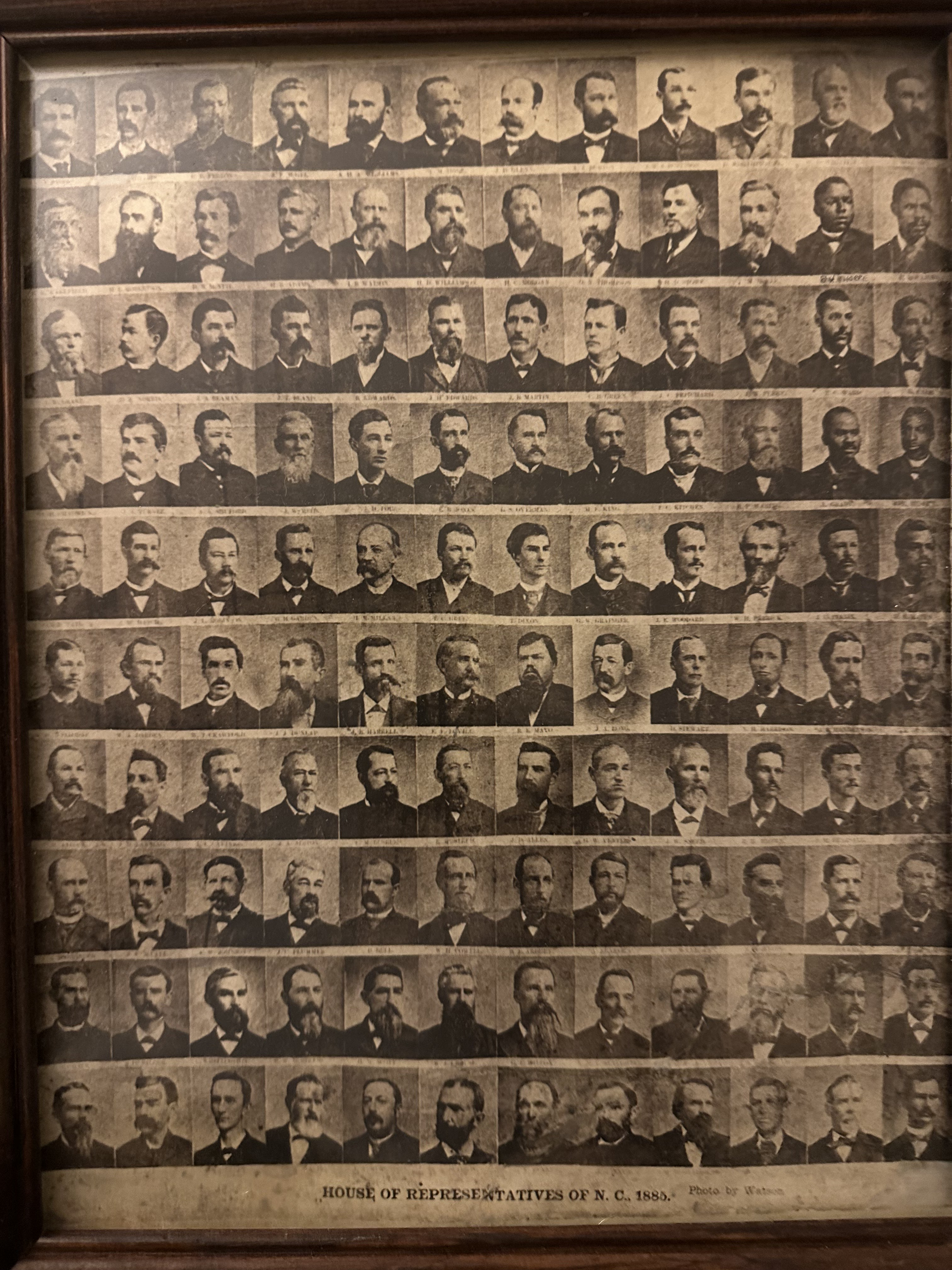
Members of the North Carolina House of Representatives in 1885

Thorpe and other African American legislators lodged with Dr. W. H. Moore in Raleigh. Thorpe represented Edgecombe County.

== See also ==
- African American officeholders from the end of the Civil War until before 1900
