= Fountain Correctional Center =

Fountain Correctional Center may refer to these prisons:

- Fountain Correctional Center for Women (closed)
- Fountain Correctional Facility in Alabama
