= Lincoln Park Historic District =

Lincoln Park Historic District may refer to:

- Lincoln Park Historic District (Pomona, California), listed on the National Register of Historic Places (NRHP) in Los Angeles County
- Lincoln Park Historic District (Newark, New Jersey), listed on the NRHP in Essex County
- West Bergen-East Lincoln Park Historic District (Jersey City, New Jersey), listed on the NRHP in Hudson County
- Lincoln Park Historic District (Las Vegas, New Mexico), listed on the NRHP in San Miguel County
- Lincoln Park Historic District (Rocky Mount, North Carolina), listed on the NRHP in Edgecombe County

== See also ==
- Lincoln Historic District (disambiguation) (of which there are at least two)
