= Coolmore Plantation =

Historic house in North Carolina, United States

- U.S. National Register of Historic Places
- U.S. National Historic Landmark
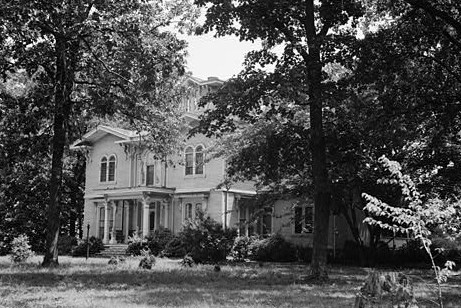
- Coolmore in 1940

- Location within North Carolina Location within the United States
- Location: North Carolina Highway 43 (ALT United States Highway 64), west of Tarboro, North Carolina
- Coordinates: 35°55′26″N 77°35′40″W
- Area: 24.4 acres (9.9 ha)
- Built: 1859
- Architect: E.G. Lind
- Architectural style: Italianate
- NRHP reference No.: 71000581

Significant dates
- Added to NRHP: February 18, 1971
- Designated NHL: June 2, 1978

Coolmore Plantation, also known as Coolmore and the Powell House, is a historic plantation house located near Tarboro, Edgecombe County, North Carolina. Built in 1858–61, the main house is one of the finest Italianate-style plantation houses in the state. The house and its similarly styled outbuildings were designed by Baltimore architect E. G. Lind for Dr. Joseph J.W. and Martha Powell. Paintwork is by Baltimore artist Ernst Dreyer. Coolmore was designated a National Historic Landmark for its architecture in 1978, and is a Save America's Treasures project.

== Description and history ==
Coolmore is located west of Tarboro, on the south side of ALT United States Route 64 east of McNair Road. Set on a curving drive, the main house is a two-story wood-frame structure, with single-story wings to either side. Its roof is hipped, but there are gabled projections with wide overhanging eaves supported by elaborately cut brackets. First-floor windows are paired with narrow rectangular sash, set in segmented-arch openings with molded bracketed hoods, while second-floor windows are paired with round-arch sash.

The interior is divided into elaborately decorated and unusually shaped chambers. At its center is a freestanding elliptical staircase. One of the downstairs parlors features a high-quality trompe-l'œil mural on the ceiling. Outbuildings with similar exterior styling include servants' quarters, a smokehouse, and a carriage house, all of which sport cupolas similar to that on the main house.

The property was donated to Preservation North Carolina in the early 1990s. Opening Coolmore to the general public at this time is not realistic, due to the fragility of its signature oval stairwell, Trompe-l'œil paneling, elaborate plasterwork, and decorative painting. So the property has been leased long-term to resident curators, direct descendants of the original builder who open it periodically by appointment and take care of routine operating and capital needs.

Preservation North Carolina has taken responsibility for developing a conservation plan for the property and for dealing with the extensive artwork in the main house. An endowment for the property has been started at the North Carolina Community Foundation to help with Coolmore's long-term care.

Coolmore was listed on the National Register of Historic Places in 1971 and declared a National Historic Landmark in 1978.

== See also ==
- List of National Historic Landmarks in North Carolina
- National Register of Historic Places listings in Edgecombe County, North Carolina
