= Dr. A. B. Nobles House and McKendree Church =

Historic buildings in North Carolina, United States

- U.S. National Register of Historic Places
- Location within North Carolina Location within the United States
- Location: NW of Mercer on SR 1224, near Mercer, North Carolina
- Coordinates: 35°52′12″N 77°39′26″W
- Area: 391 acres (158 ha)
- Built: c. 1865-1870, 1875
- Architectural style: Gothic Revival
- NRHP reference No.: 80002825
- Added to NRHP: June 19, 1980

Dr. A. B. Nobles House and McKendree Church, also known as the McKendree Farm and Chosumneda, is a historic house and church located near Mercer, Edgecombe County, North Carolina. The house was built between 1865 and 1870, and is a two-story, Gothic Revival-style brick cottage. The McKendree Church was built about 1875, and is a simple, one-story frame structure, sheathed in weatherboard.

It was listed on the National Register of Historic Places in 1980.
