= Edgecombe County Public Schools =

School district in North Carolina

Location
- Edgecombe County, North Carolina United States

District information
- Type: Public
- Grades: PK–12
- Established: 1993
- Superintendent: Dr. Andrew Bryan
- Schools: 15
- Budget: $58 million (2015-2016)
- NCES District ID: 3701320

Students and staff
- Students: 6,097 (2017-2018)
- Teachers: 393.17 (2017-2018)
- Staff: 799.85 (2017-2018)
- Student–teacher ratio: 15.51 (2017-2018)

Other information
- Website: www.ecps.us

Edgecombe County Public Schools (previously called Edgecombe County Schools) is a PK–12 graded school district serving Edgecombe County, North Carolina. It was formed in 1993 from the merger of the old Edgecombe County Schools and Tarboro City Schools systems. The system's nine schools serve 7,477 students as of the 2010–11 school year.

== History ==
The Edgecombe County Public Schools system developed from the merger of the old Edgecombe County Schools and Tarboro City Schools. At the same time, a merger push was happening in neighboring Nash County. The movements in both counties had been going on for years, motivated in part by declining enrollments in Rocky Mounty City Schools, but disagreements focused on district borders. Since the town of Rocky Mount exists in both counties, there was some delay in the merger finalization as court battles over district boundaries and other issues dominated discussions. The original push for merger started in the late 1970s. The state legislature approved the merger in 1991, but this was not finalized until 1993. In 2003, the system officially changed its name from Edgecombe County Schools to Edgecombe County Public Schools.

== Student demographics ==
For the 2017–18 school year, Edgecombe County Schools had a total population of 6,097 students and 393.17 teachers on a (FTE) basis. This produced a student-teacher ratio of 15.51:1. In 2010-2011, out of the student total, the gender ratio was 51% male to 49% female. The demographic group makeup was: Black, 57%; White, 34%; Hispanic, 8%; American Indian, 0%; and Asian/Pacific Islander, 0% (two or more races: 2%). For the same school year, 79.75% of the students received free and reduced-cost lunches.

== Governance ==
The primary governing body of Edgecombe County Schools follows a council–manager government format with a seven-member Board of Education appointing a Superintendent to run the day-to-day operations of the system. The school system currently resides in the North Carolina State Board of Education's Third District.

=== Board of education ===
The seven members of the Board of Education generally meet on the second Monday of each month. They are elected to four-year staggered terms. The current members of the board are:

- Evelyn S. Wilson, District One (Chair)
- Lillie R. Worsley, District Two
- Evelyn Johnson, District Three
- William Ellis, District Four (Vice-Chair)
- Ann R. Kent, District Five
- Raymond Privott, District Six
- Jewel J. Calhoun, District Seven

=== Superintendent ===
The current superintendent of the system is Dr. Andrew Bryan who served as superintendent of Lee County Schools for over a decade. His career began as a social studies teacher and athletics coach, later with terms as athletic director, assistant principal, high school principal and associate superintendent of curriculum and instruction. He was recognized in 2016 as Lee County NAACP’s Educator of the Year and in 2014 as North Carolina Art Education Association Friend of the Arts. Dr. Bryan holds Doctor of Education and Master of Education degrees in educational administration and supervision from the University of Virginia and received his Bachelor of Arts in history and political science from Longwood University. Dr. Bryan Bryan succeeds the retiring Dr. Valerie Bridges

== Member schools ==
Edgecombe County Schools has 15 schools ranging from pre-kindergarten to twelfth grade. These are separated into four high schools, four middle schools, and six elementary schools.

=== High schools ===
- Edgecombe Early College High School (Tarboro)
- North Edgecombe High School (Leggett)
- SouthWest Edgecombe High School (Pinetops)
- Tarboro High School (Tarboro)

=== Middle schools ===
- JW Parker Middle (Rocky Mount)
- Martin Millennium Academy (Tarboro)
- Phillips Middle School (Battleboro)
- South Edgecombe Middle School (Pinetops)
- West Edgecombe Middle School (Rocky Mount)
- Pattillo Middle School (Tarboro, North Carolina)

=== Elementary schools ===
- Baskerville Elementary (Rocky Mount)
- D. S. Johnson Elementary (Rocky Mount)
- Coker-Wimberly Elementary School (Battleboro)
- Fairview Elementary School (Rocky Mount)
- G. W. Bulluck Elementary School (Rocky Mount)
- G. W. Carver Elementary School (Pinetops)
- Princeville Elementary School; formerly Princeville Montessori (Tarboro)
- Stocks Elementary School (Tarboro)

=== K-8 ===
- Connections Learning Academy

== Athletics ==
According to the North Carolina High School Athletic Association, for the 2018–2019 school year

- North Edgecombe High School is a 1A school in the Tar Roanoke Conference.
- SouthWest Edgecombe High Schools is a 2A school in the Eastern Plains Conference.
- Tarboro High School is a 1A school in the Coastal Plains Conference.
- The Early College and Roberson Center do not have athletic teams.

== See also ==
- List of school districts in North Carolina
