= Piney Prospect =

Historic house in North Carolina, United States

- U.S. National Register of Historic Places
- Location within North Carolina Location within the United States
- Location: 5.7 miles S of Tarboro off SR 1601, near Tarboro, North Carolina
- Coordinates: 35°48′49″N 77°34′1″W
- Area: 9.9 acres (4.0 ha)
- Built: c. 1820, 1860
- Built by: Evans, Peter
- Architectural style: Early Republic, Adamesque
- NRHP reference No.: 71000584
- Added to NRHP: February 18, 1971

Piney Prospect, also known as the Sugg House, is a historic home located near Tarboro, Edgecombe County, North Carolina. The original house was built about 1800, and enlarged to its present size about 1820. It is a two-story, rectangular, frame dwelling in the Early Republic style. It features a four-bay, two-tiered recessed porch with three free standing and two engaged columns. The interior has Adamesque design elements. Also on the property is a large barn built about 1860.

It was listed on the National Register of Historic Places in 1971.
