= Howell Homeplace =

Historic house in North Carolina, United States

- U.S. National Register of Historic Places
- Location within North Carolina Location within the United States
- Location: SR 1517, near Tarboro, North Carolina
- Coordinates: 35°54′40″N 77°28′05″W
- Area: 478 acres (193 ha)
- Built by: Zoeller, Edward
- Architectural style: Greek Revival, Greek Revival Vernacular
- NRHP reference No.: 84000532
- Added to NRHP: December 20, 1984

Howell Homeplace, also known as the William Brinkley Howell Homeplace, is a historic home located near Tarboro, Edgecombe County, North Carolina. The frame dwelling dates to the mid-19th century, and is a two-story cubicle house sheathed in weatherboard with a hipped roof. The vernacular Greek Revival interior features extraordinary painted decoration in the entrance and stairhalls. The decoration is attributed to Edward Zoeller, a Bavarian fresco painter, who also decorated the Redmond-Shackelford House. Also on the property is a contributing outbuilding.

It was listed on the National Register of Historic Places in 1984.
