= Walston-Bulluck House =

Historic house in North Carolina, United States

- U.S. National Register of Historic Places
- U.S. Historic district – Contributing property
- Location within North Carolina Location within the United States
- Location: 1018 St. Andrews St., Tarboro, North Carolina
- Coordinates: 35°54′10″N 77°32′14″W
- Area: 0.3 acres (0.12 ha)
- Built: c. 1795
- NRHP reference No.: 71000585
- Added to NRHP: February 18, 1971

Walston-Bulluck House, also known as the Pender Museum, is a historic home located at Tarboro, Edgecombe County, North Carolina. It was built about 1795, and is a one-story, three-bay, frame dwelling. It has a Hall and parlor plan and two reconstructed double-shouldered brick end chimneys. The house is sheathed in weatherboard, has a gable roof, and rests on a brick pier foundation. It was moved from its original location near Conetoe to its present site in 1969, and restored by the Edgecomb County Historical Society.

It was listed on the National Register of Historic Places in 1971. It is located in the Tarboro Historic District.
