= St. John's Episcopal Church (Battleboro, North Carolina) =

Historic church in North Carolina, United States

- U.S. National Register of Historic Places
- Location within North Carolina Location within the United States
- Location: 211 E. Battleboro Ave., Battleboro, North Carolina
- Coordinates: 36°2′47″N 77°44′53″W
- Area: 0.5 acres (0.20 ha)
- Built: 1891
- NRHP reference No.: 71000577
- Added to NRHP: February 18, 1971

St. John's Episcopal Church is a historic Episcopal church on East Battleboro Avenue in Battleboro, Edgecombe County, North Carolina. The church was built in 1891, and is a one-story, board-and-batten frame building with a steep gable roof. It features lancet windows and a tower with crenellated top and pyramidal spire. The church was consecrated in 1896.

It was listed on the National Register of Historic Places in 1971.
