= The Barracks (Tarboro, North Carolina) =

Historic house in North Carolina, United States

- U.S. National Register of Historic Places
- U.S. Historic district – Contributing property
- Location within North Carolina Location within the United States
- Location: 1100 Albemarle St., Tarboro, North Carolina
- Coordinates: 35°54′8″N 77°32′30″W
- Area: 1 acre (0.40 ha)
- Built: 1858
- Architect: Percival, William
- Architectural style: Greek Revival, Italianate, Italian Villa
- NRHP reference No.: 71000578
- Added to NRHP: February 18, 1971

The Barracks is a historic plantation house located at Tarboro, Edgecombe County, North Carolina. It was built about 1858, and is a two-story, brick dwelling with Greek Revival and Italianate style design elements. It features a central projecting bay with distyle pedimented portico. The portico has fluted columns and a frieze. The house is topped by a cross-gable roof and cupola.

"The Barracks" was originally built for William Smith Battle and his family. The Battle family, among other holdings, developed and owned the cotton mills at Rocky Mount, NC, which were the largest cotton mills in The South at one time.

It was listed on the National Register of Historic Places in 1971. It is located in the Tarboro Historic District.
