= Cotton Press (Tarboro, North Carolina) =

- U.S. National Register of Historic Places
- U.S. Historic district – Contributing property
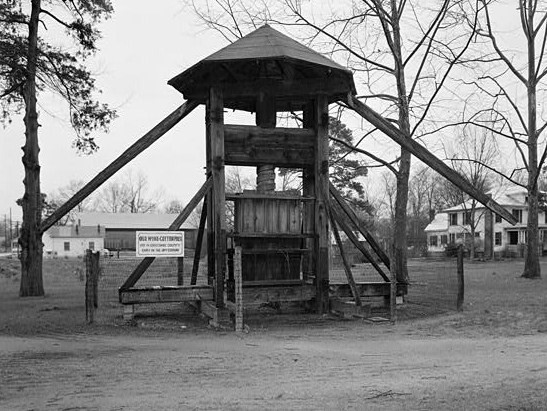
- Tarboro cotton press

- Location within North Carolina Location within the United States
- Location: Albemarle Street; Town Common, Tarboro, North Carolina
- Coordinates: 35°53′57″N 77°32′18″W
- Area: 0.3 acres (0.12 ha)
- Built: 1840
- NRHP reference No.: 71000582
- Added to NRHP: February 18, 1971

The Tarboro Cotton Press, which is also called the Norfleet Cotton Press or the Edgecombe County Cotton Press, is a wooden cotton press built in the mid-18th century in Edgecombe County, North Carolina. It was moved to the Tarboro Town Common of Tarboro, North Carolina. It was named to the National Register of Historic Places on February 18, 1971. It is located in the Tarboro Historic District.

== History ==
The first owner of the press was Isaac Norfleet, at a plantation about 2.5 mi (4 km) southwest of Tarboro in Edgecombe County. It was originally a cider and wine press. Around 1860, the press was converted to a cotton press because of the growing need to process the cotton crop. The press is constructed of yellow pine. It has a large screw that is used to compress the cotton into a wooden form to produce the bale. The supporting frame has four upright posts with braces. There are two long booms. These booms or poles have been called "buzzard wings." Animal hitches were attached to the booms. Mules and oxen were used to rotate the screw. The overall height of the press is 22 ft (7 m).

Pictures of the cotton press at its original location show a rectangular open shed with a steep hip roof. The top of the press extends through this roof. It is covered by a smaller, rectangular hip roof that rotates with the screw.

In 1938, the press was moved to Tarboro's Town Common on Albemarle Street, but its shed was demolished. A small octagonal hip roof was built over the press. Restoration of the cotton press was completed in 1976. The octagonal roof was removed and a pavilion resembling the original shed has been built to protect the cotton press from the elements.

Additional photographs of the cotton press were taken for the Historic American Buildings Survey. Other photographs are available.

There is a similar, older wooden cotton press near Latta, South Carolina. Another antebellum cotton press without the buzzard wings poles is at Magnolia Plantation near Derry, Louisiana. This press has a fixed screw and its base is rotated to compress the cotton.
