= Batts House and Outbuildings =

Historic house in North Carolina, United States

- U.S. National Register of Historic Places
- Location within North Carolina Location within the United States
- Location: E side of US 258 N, 2.05 miles S of NC 1513 5098 US 258 N, near Tarboro, North Carolina
- Coordinates: 35°56′49″N 77°29′54″W
- Area: less than one acre
- Built: c. 1810, c. 1880, 1912
- Architectural style: Italianate, plank agricultural buildings
- NRHP reference No.: 06000226
- Added to NRHP: April 5, 2006

Batts House and Outbuildings is a historic home and associated outbuildings located near Tarboro, Edgecombe County, North Carolina. The dwelling dates to about 1880, and is a two-story frame Italianate-style house. Also on the property are the contributing one-story frame doctor's office (c. 1880), a small dairy (c. 1880), a log smokehouse and wood shed (c. 1810), a dilapidated corn barn (c. 1810), and a carriage house, later converted to a garage (1912). Also on the property is a family cemetery (c. 1808–1885).

It was listed on the National Register of Historic Places in 2006.
