= Josiah Pender =

Josiah Solomon Pender (March 11, 1819 – October 25, 1864) was an American soldier in the Confederate Army. He is best known for leading the capture of Fort Macon in April 1861.

== Life ==
Pender was born in the Tarboro area of Edgecombe County to Solomon and Mary Batts Pender. Pender followed in his father's footsteps by entering the U.S. Military Academy in 1835, but left the following year due to his unwillingness to adapt to military life. After leaving the academy, he studied painting in Paris and Rome before returning to the United States in 1840.

Pender bought the Atlantic Hotel on the waterfront in Beaufort in 1856.

Pender married twice. He fathered nine children by his first wife, Maria, who died in 1861. He married a second time to a cousin, Laura Pender on September 23, 1862 and had a son by her.

== Civil War ==
Pender joined the Confederate Army in 1861, forming the Beaufort Harbor Guards with the purpose of taking over Fort Macon before Union troops could seize it.

=== Battle of Fort Macon ===
On April 14, 1861, Pender recaptured Fort Macon from Union soldiers.

=== Discharge ===
When his first wife became ill, Pender requested and was denied a leave of absence to return home to care for her; however, he decided to go home anyway. In November 1861, Pender was convicted of being absent without leave and was discharged from the army.

== Aftermath ==
After his discharge, Pender became part of a blockade running operation, smuggling goods out of Bermuda to support the Confederates. He also sailed to England to obtain goods, where he caught yellow fever.

== Death ==
Pender died in Beaufort from yellow fever on October 25, 1864.
