= Edgecombe Agricultural Works =

Historic building in North Carolina, US

- U.S. National Register of Historic Places
- Location within North Carolina Location within the United States
- Location: Roughly bounded by Main, Howard, Albemarle, and Walnut Sts., Tarboro, North Carolina
- Coordinates: 35°54′18″N 77°32′27″W
- Area: less than one acre
- Built: 1872
- MPS: Tarboro MRA
- NRHP reference No.: 80002828
- Added to NRHP: April 2, 1980

Edgecombe Agricultural Works is a historic factory building located at Tarboro, Edgecombe County, North Carolina. It was built in 1872, and is a long, low gable roof brick structure. It is of heavy timber frame construction and features parapetted, stepped gable ends. The Edgecombe Agricultural Works and later Edgecombe Machine Shop continued to manufacture and repair farm implements to the early 20th century.

It was listed on the National Register of Historic Places in 1980.
