= St. Paul Baptist Church (Tarboro, North Carolina) =

Historic church in North Carolina, United States

- U.S. National Register of Historic Places
- Location within North Carolina Location within the United States
- Location: 900 Lloyd Street, Tarboro, North Carolina
- Coordinates: 35°58′41″N 77°31′54″W
- Area: less than one acre
- Built: 1871
- MPS: Tarboro MRA
- NRHP reference No.: 80002831
- Added to NRHP: April 2, 1980

St. Paul Baptist Church is a historic African-American Baptist church located at Lloyd St and Edmondson Avenue in Tarboro, Edgecombe County, North Carolina. The church was built in 1871, and is a one-story, irregularly massed frame building with multiple gabled wings, and a corner tower. It is sheathed in weatherboard with abundant wooden decoration. The interior features a large open sanctuary with a dome and oculus above. It was moved from its original Main Street site to the present location about 1926.

It was listed on the National Register of Historic Places in 1980.
