= The Grove (Tarboro, North Carolina) =

Historic house in North Carolina, United States

- U.S. National Register of Historic Places
- U.S. Historic district – Contributing property
- Location within North Carolina Location within the United States
- Location: 130 Bridgers St., Tarboro, North Carolina
- Coordinates: 35°54′10″N 77°32′14″W
- Area: 9.9 acres (4.0 ha)
- Built: 1808
- Architectural style: Federal
- NRHP reference No.: 71000583
- Added to NRHP: February 18, 1971

The Grove, also known as Blount-Bridgers House, is a historic home located at Tarboro, Edgecombe County, North Carolina. It was built about 1808, and is a two-story, five-bay, Federal style frame dwelling. It has a gable roof and pairs of double-shouldered brick end chimneys. It was the home of Thomas Blount (1759–1812), an American Revolutionary War veteran and statesman.

It was listed on the National Register of Historic Places in 1971. It is located in the Tarboro Historic District.

Edgecombe Arts is located in the Blount-Bridgers House, which features a permanent collection of works by Tarboro-born artist Hobson Pittman (1899–1972), including oil paintings, pastels, drawings, prints and watercolors. Blount-Bridgers House also exhibits locally made period furniture and 19th-century paintings as well as works by Thomas Sully, Thomas Landseer and William Garle Brown. There are also changing exhibits of contemporary artists.
