= Tarboro Town Common =

- U.S. National Register of Historic Places
- U.S. Historic district – Contributing property
- Location within North Carolina Location within the United States
- Location: Bounded by Wilson St., Albemarle Ave., Park Ave. and St. Patrick St., Tarboro, North Carolina
- Coordinates: 35°53′53″N 77°32′9″W
- Area: 7 acres (2.8 ha)
- Built: 1760
- NRHP reference No.: 70000453
- Added to NRHP: September 30, 1970

Tarboro Town Common is a historic town common located at Tarboro, Edgecombe County, North Carolina. The common was established in 1760, and is an open space containing several memorials and a fountain. It originally consisted of 50 acres (20 ha). The commons contains five contributing objects: the Cotton Press; a Confederate memorial (1904); an obelisk; a memorial to the Spanish–American War dead; and a two-tier, cast iron fountain.

It was listed on the National Register of Historic Places in 1970. It is located in the Tarboro Historic District.
