= Rocky Mount metropolitan area =

Twin Counties
- MSA
- Rocky Mount, NC Metropolitan Statistical Area
- Rocky Mount Metropolitan Statistical Area Wilson Micropolitan Statistical Area Roanoke Rapids Micropolitan Statistical Area
- Country: United States
- State: North Carolina
- Principal cities: Rocky Mount; Tarboro; Nashville

Area
  - Total: 1,046 sq mi (2,710 km^{2})

Population (2017 Census estimate)
  - Density: 140/sq mi (54/km^{2})
  - MSA: 146,738
- Time zone: EST
  - Summer (DST): EDT
- Area code: 252

The Rocky Mount, NC Metropolitan Statistical Area, as defined by the United States Census Bureau, is an area consisting of two counties – Edgecombe and Nash – in eastern North Carolina, anchored by the city of Rocky Mount. As of the 2010 census, the MSA had a population of 152,392. It is commonly referred to as the Twin Counties.

== Counties ==
- Edgecombe
- Nash

== Communities ==
- Places with more than 50,000 inhabitants
  - Rocky Mount (Principal city)
- Places with 1,000 to 15,000 inhabitants
  - Nashville
  - Pinetops
  - Red Oak
  - Sharpsburg (partial)
  - Spring Hope
  - Tarboro
  - Zebulon (partially)
- Places with 500 to 1,000 inhabitants
  - Bailey
  - Dortches
  - Middlesex
  - Princeville
  - Whitakers
- Places with less than 500 inhabitants
  - Castalia
  - Conetoe
  - Leggett
  - Macclesfield
  - Momeyer
  - Speed
- Unincorporated places
  - Crisp

== Demographics ==
As of the 2017 census estimate, there were 143,026 people and 57,083 households within the MSA. The racial makeup of the MSA was 45.7% White, 45.8% African American, 0.5% Native American, 0.6% Asian, 0% Pacific Islander, 0.1% from other races, and 1.5% from two or more races. Hispanic or Latino of any race were 5.8% of the population.

The median income for a household in the MSA was $42,784. The per capita income for the MSA was $23,320.

== See also ==
- North Carolina census statistical areas
- List of cities, towns, and villages in North Carolina
- List of unincorporated communities in North Carolina
