= Princeville School =

Historic school building in North Carolina, United States

- U.S. National Register of Historic Places
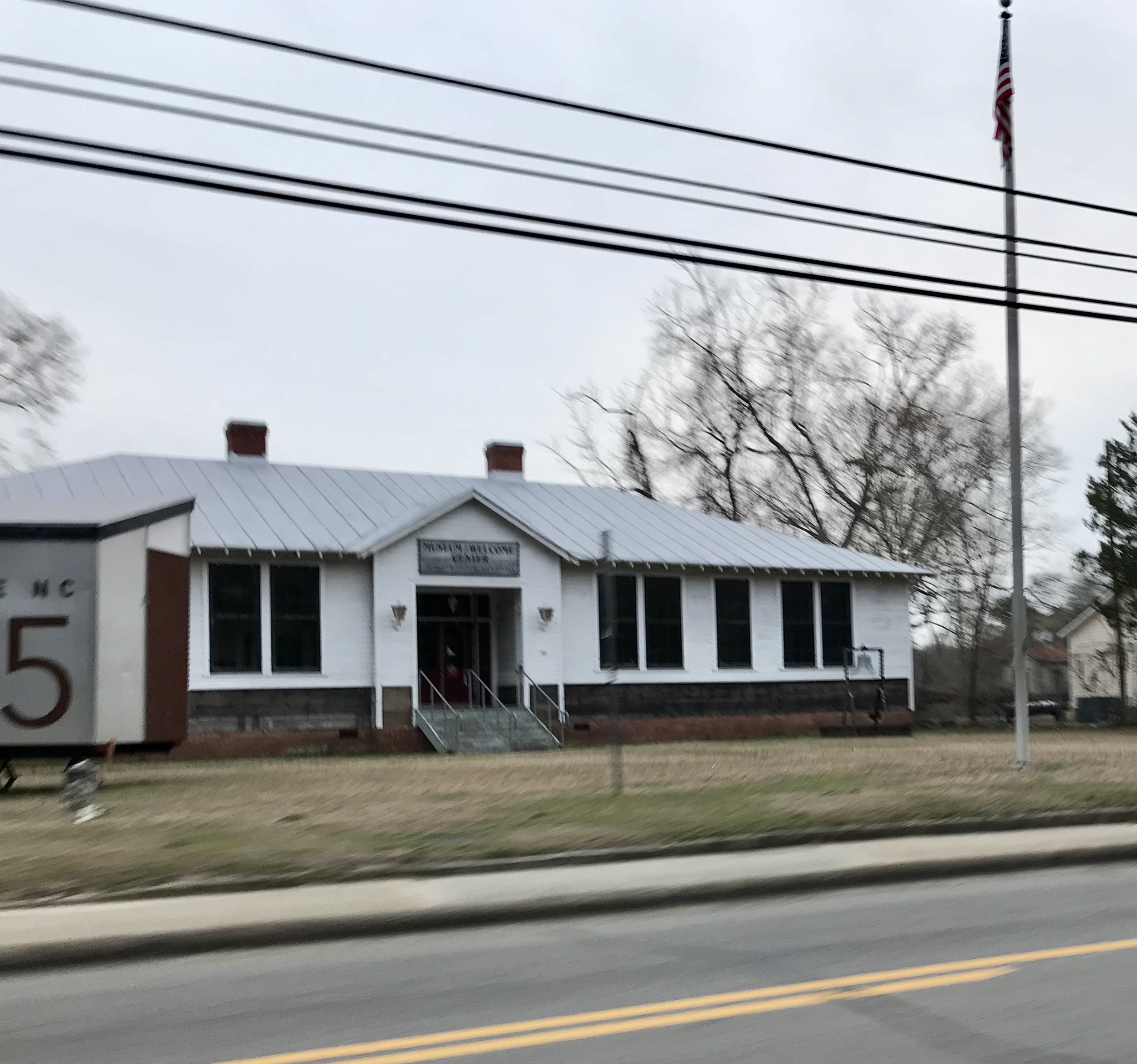

- Location within North Carolina Location within the United States
- Location: US 258, 0.3 mi. E of NC 64, Princeville, North Carolina
- Coordinates: 35°53′24″N 77°31′37″W
- Area: 1.4 acres (0.57 ha)
- Built: 1935-1940
- Architectural style: craftsman influenced
- NRHP reference No.: 00001615
- Added to NRHP: January 9, 2001

Princeville School, also known as Princeville Graded Colored School, is a historic school for African-American students located at Princeville, Edgecombe County, North Carolina. It was built between 1935 and 1940, and is a one-story weatherboarded building, eleven bays wide and two rooms deep, with a recessed front-gable center entrance. It sits on a high brick pier foundation and has a hipped roof. The school closed in 1960, and the building served as Princeville's town hall from 1960 until 1999.

It was listed on the National Register of Historic Places in 2001.
