= Eastern Star Baptist Church =

Historic church in North Carolina, United States

- U.S. National Register of Historic Places
- Location within North Carolina Location within the United States
- Location: Church and Wagner Sts., Tarboro, North Carolina
- Coordinates: 35°53′36″N 77°31′50″W
- Area: less than one acre
- Built: c. 1875
- Architectural style: Gothic, Carpenter Gothic
- MPS: Tarboro MRA
- NRHP reference No.: 80002827
- Added to NRHP: April 2, 1980

Eastern Star Baptist Church was a historic Baptist church located at Church and Wagner Streets in Tarboro, Edgecombe County, North Carolina. The church was built about 1875, and was a one-story, Carpenter Gothic style building. It was built by a Presbyterian congregation, then moved to its final location and used by the African-American Eastern Star Baptist Church starting in 1906. It has been demolished.

It was listed on the National Register of Historic Places in 1980.
