= Redmond-Shackelford House =

Historic house in North Carolina, United States

- U.S. National Register of Historic Places
- U.S. Historic district – Contributing property
- Location within North Carolina Location within the United States
- Location: 300 Main St., Tarboro, North Carolina
- Coordinates: 35°53′46″N 77°32′8″W
- Area: less than one acre
- Built: 1885
- Architectural style: Second Empire
- NRHP reference No.: 76001320
- Added to NRHP: December 12, 1976

Redmond-Shackelford House is a historic home located at Tarboro, Edgecombe County, North Carolina, United States. It was built in 1885, and is a two-story, three bay Second Empire-style stuccoed brick dwelling with a one-story rear wing. It features concave mansard roofs on both sections with round-arched dormers. The interior features an array of painted and plaster ornament. The decoration is attributed to Edward Zoeller, a Bavarian fresco painter, who also decorated the Howell Homeplace. Also on the property is a contributing brick kitchen with a hipped roof.

It was listed on the National Register of Historic Places in 1976. It is located in the Tarboro Historic District.
