= Oakland Plantation (Tarboro, North Carolina) =

Historic house in North Carolina, United States

- U.S. National Register of Historic Places
- Location within North Carolina Location within the United States
- Location: Edmondson St., Tarboro, North Carolina
- Coordinates: 35°53′47″N 77°32′27″W
- Area: less than one acre
- MPS: Tarboro MRA
- NRHP reference No.: 80002829
- Added to NRHP: April 2, 1980

Oakland Plantation, also known as Lloyd Farm and the Elks Lodge, is a historic plantation house located at Tarboro, Edgecombe County, North Carolina. The frame dwelling dates to the mid-19th century, and consists of a two-story central section with flanking one-story wings and a series of rear additions. It has shallow hip roofs with Italianate brackets and features a one-story porch of the distinctive Tarboro lattice type. By 1931, the dwelling was occupied as an Elks Lodge for the African-American population.

It was listed on the National Register of Historic Places in 1976.
