= Old Town Plantation =

Historic house in North Carolina, United States

- U.S. National Register of Historic Places
- Location within North Carolina Location within the United States
- Location: Off NC 97, near Battleboro, North Carolina
- Coordinates: 35°58′54″N 77°43′52″W
- Area: 10.1 acres (4.1 ha)
- Built: c. 1742
- NRHP reference No.: 72000961
- Added to NRHP: January 20, 1972; December 1, 1983

Old Town Plantation is a historic plantation house located near Battleboro, Edgecombe County, North Carolina. It was built about 1742, and is a 1 1/2-story, frame dwelling with a gambrel roof on a brick foundation. It features a double-shoulder Flemish bond chimney with small brick wings, and two other brick chimneys. The house has a hall-and-parlor plan. Also on the property is a contributing log storage house with a pyramidal roof and a board-and-batten door. The house was moved in 1983, to a new site less than one mile west of the original site.

It was listed on the National Register of Historic Places in 1972, and relisted in 1983.
