= Lone Pine (Tarboro, North Carolina) =

Historic farm in North Carolina, United States

- U.S. National Register of Historic Places
- U.S. Historic district
- Location within North Carolina Location within the United States
- Location: SR 1207, S of US 64, near Tarboro, North Carolina
- Coordinates: 35°54′48″N 77°36′09″W
- Area: 180.6 acres (73.1 ha)
- Built: c. 1860
- Architectural style: Greek Revival, Italianate
- NRHP reference No.: 87001901
- Added to NRHP: November 6, 1987

Lone Pine is a historic home and national historic district located near Tarboro, Edgecombe County, North Carolina. The district encompasses eight contributing buildings associated with the Lone Pine tobacco farm complex. The house was built about 1860, and is a two-story, rectangular, weatherboarded frame dwelling with Greek Revival and Italianate style design elements. It has a hipped tin roof pierced by two interior chimneys and a hipped tetrastyle portico. Also on the property are several structures and two contributing frame tobacco barns.

It was listed on the National Register of Historic Places in 1987.
