= Quigless Clinic =

- U.S. National Register of Historic Places
- Location within North Carolina Location within the United States
- Location: 99 Main St., Tarboro, North Carolina
- Coordinates: 35°53′40″N 77°31′58″W
- Area: less than one acre
- Built: 1946
- Architectural style: Early Commercial
- NRHP reference No.: 00001232
- Added to NRHP: October 27, 2000

Quigless Clinic, also known as Quigless Clinic–Hospital, is a historic hospital building located at Tarboro, Edgecombe County, North Carolina. It was built in 1946 to serve the African-American population of Tarboro. It is a two-story, rectangular brick building with large glass block windows.

It was listed on the National Register of Historic Places in 2000.
