= Lincoln Historic District =

Lincoln Historic District may refer to:

- Lincoln Historic District (Hingham, Massachusetts), listed on the National Register of Historic Places (NRHP)
- Lincoln Historic District (Lincoln, New Mexico), also NRHP-listed

== See also ==
- Lincoln Park Historic District (disambiguation) (of which there are at least three)
