= Laura Pender =

Laura Pender was a woman on the side of the Confederacy during the American Civil War.

== Life ==
When she was coming back from a trip to Bermuda a Union ship attacked her boat. Her husband, Josiah Pender, was going to surrender because his crew was much smaller. Mrs. Pender said she would stand on the deck risking her life so that her husband would not surrender. It worked and she saved many goods for the Confederacy. After that battle, she went back home to Wilmington, North Carolina.

== Death ==
Laura Pender died in 1875.
