= Ed Weeks (grower) =

American vegetable grower

Ed Weeks set numerous world records for growing large vegetables. In 1964, he founded Weeks Seed Company. He resided in Tarboro, North Carolina.

== Records ==
Records set by Weeks:

- 1970: 118 lb Watermelon
- 1975: 197 lb Watermelon
- 1977: 39 lb Cantaloupe
- 1978: 3.5 inch long Peanut
