= Tarboro Historic District =

Historic district in North Carolina, United States

- U.S. National Register of Historic Places
- U.S. Historic district
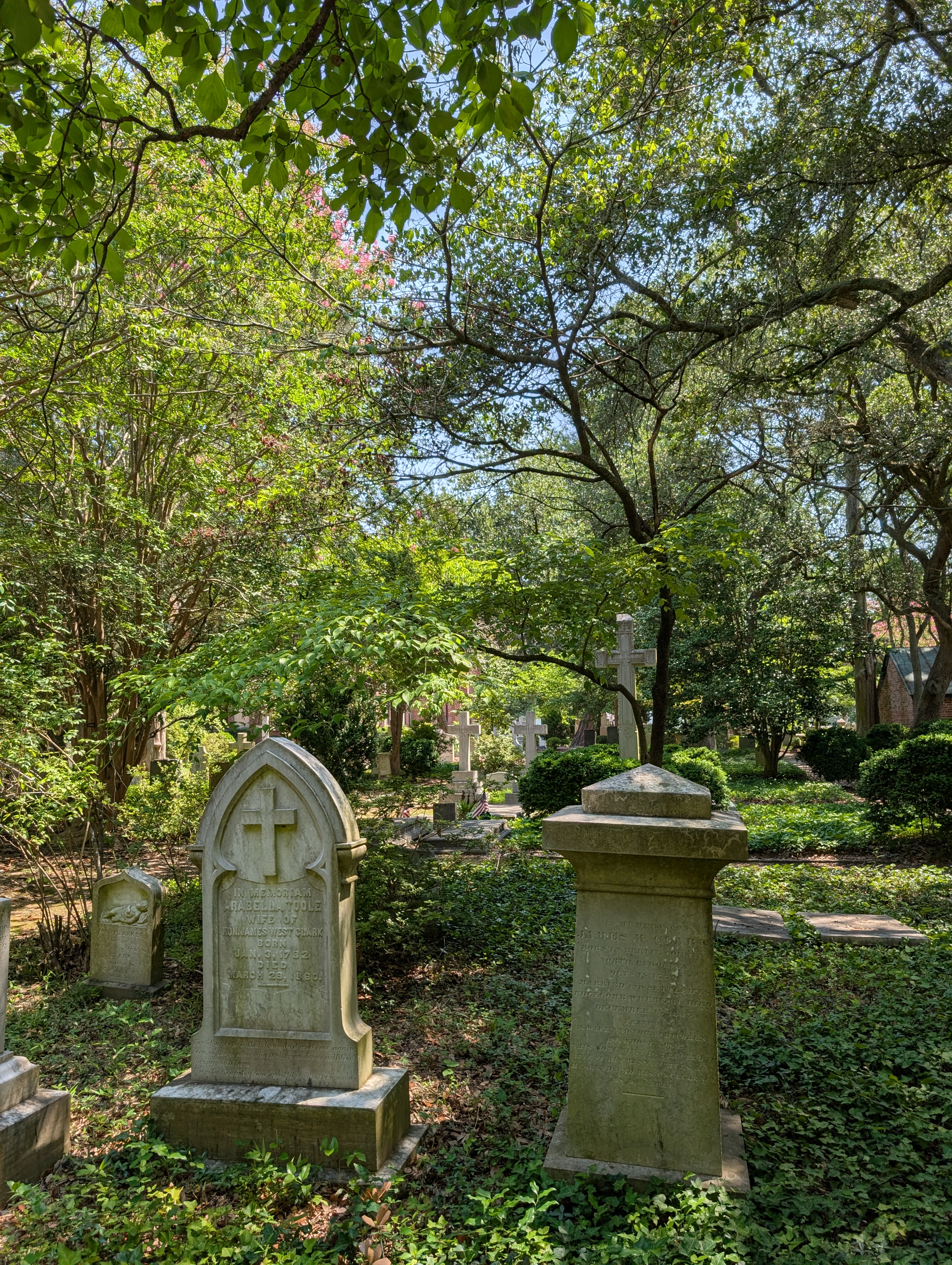
- Gravestones at Calvary Episcopal Church in the District

- Location within North Carolina Location within the United States
- Location: Roughly bounded by Albemarle Ave., Walnut, Panola, and Water Sts., and River Rd., Tarboro, North Carolina
- Coordinates: 35°53′44″N 77°32′15″W
- Area: 330 acres (130 ha)
- Architect: Multiple
- MPS: Tarboro MRA
- NRHP reference No.: 80002832
- Added to NRHP: April 2, 1980

Tarboro Historic District is a national historic district located near Tarboro, Edgecombe County, North Carolina. The district encompasses 364 contributing buildings in central Tarboro. It includes a variety of industrial, commercial, residential, and institutional buildings dating from the late-18th through early-20th centuries. Located in the district are the separately listed Tarboro Town Common, The Barracks, Redmond-Shackelford House, Pender Museum, Blount-Bridgers House, Coates-Walston House, Calvary Episcopal Church and Churchyard, and the Cotton Press complex. Other notable buildings include the Morris-Powell House (c. 1890), Porter House (c. 1900), U. S. Post Office (1914), Pippen House (1870s), Dancy-Battle-Bass Clark House (c. 1825), Holderness House (c. 1890-1900), Howard Memorial Presbyterian Church (1908-1909), W. H. MacNair House (1913), Henry Cherry-George White House, Jones House (1870-1875), Tarboro Primitive Baptist Church (c. 1830), St. James Methodist Church (1916), Carolina Telephone & Telegraph (1912), Clark's Warehouse #1 and #2, Battle-Porter-Powell House (c. 1800), Gaskil1-Hussey House (1882), Cheshire-Nash House (c. 1869), and Norfleet Court (1858).

It was listed on the National Register of Historic Places in 1980.
