= Lincoln Park Historic District (Rocky Mount, North Carolina) =

Historic district in North Carolina, United States

- U.S. National Register of Historic Places
- U.S. Historic district
- Location within North Carolina Location within the United States
- Location: 800 block of Ellison Dr., 800–900 & 1000–1002 Leggett Rd. & 800 Carver Pl., Rocky Mount, North Carolina
- Coordinates: 35°57′15″N 77°46′45″W
- Area: 13.577 acres (5.494 ha)
- Architect: Herman, Thomas B.; Hunley and Dasher
- Architectural style: Minimal Traditional
- NRHP reference No.: 11001042
- Added to NRHP: January 20, 2012

Lincoln Park Historic District is a national historic district located at Rocky Mount, Edgecombe County, North Carolina. The district encompasses 47 contributing buildings in a middle-class African-American section of Rocky Mount. They were built between 1948 and 1953, and include an intact collection of single-family Minimal Traditional-style houses and the Lincoln Park Motel and Restaurant.

It was listed on the National Register of Historic Places in 2012.
