= Tarboro, North Carolina =

- Town
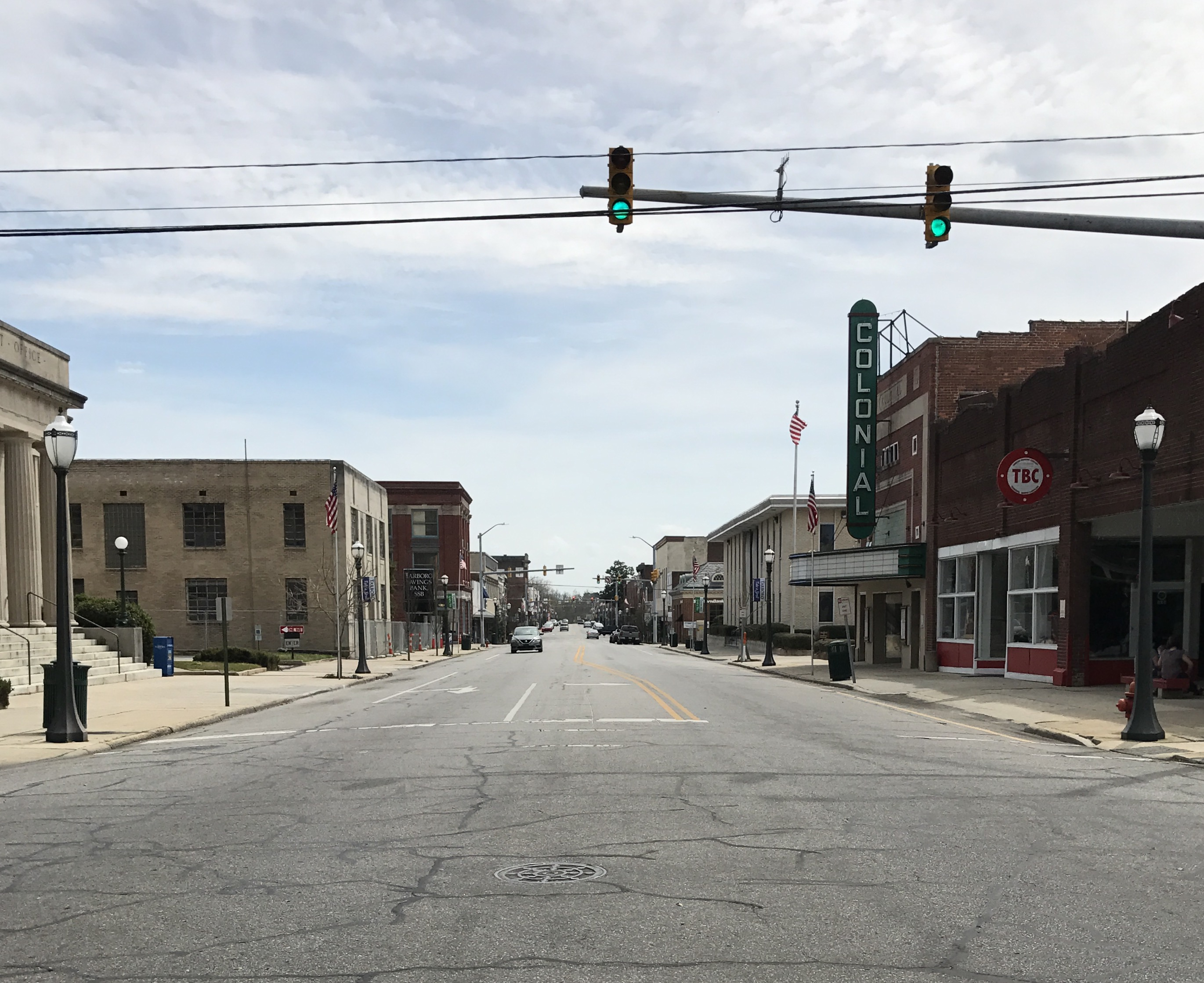
- Main Street, downtown

- Seal
- Nickname: T-Town
- Location in Edgecombe County and the state of North Carolina.
- Coordinates: 35°54′18″N 77°33′23″W
- Country: United States
- State: North Carolina
- County: Edgecombe
- Founded: 1760
- Incorporated: 1772
- Named for: Tar River

Government
  - Type: Council–Manager
  - Mayor: Tate Mayo

Area
  - Total: 11.31 sq mi (29.29 km^{2})
  - Land: 11.27 sq mi (29.19 km^{2})
  - Water: 0.039 sq mi (0.10 km^{2})
- Elevation: 62 ft (19 m)

Population (2020)
  - Total: 10,721
  - Density: 951.1/sq mi (367.22/km^{2})
- Time zone: UTC−5 (Eastern (EST))
  - Summer (DST): UTC−4 (EDT)
- ZIP code: 27886
- Area code: 252
- FIPS code: 37-66700
- GNIS feature ID: 2406714
- Website: www.tarboro-nc.com

Tarboro is a town in and the county seat of Edgecombe County, North Carolina, United States. It is part of the Rocky Mount metropolitan area. As of the 2020 census, the town had a population of 10,721. The town is on the opposite bank of the Tar River from Princeville. It is also part of the Rocky Mount-Wilson-Roanoke Rapids CSA. Tarboro is located near the western edge of North Carolina's coastal plain. It has many historical churches, some dating from as early as 1742. Tarboro is also home to the headquarters of World Cat Boats, a catamaran boat manufacturer with over 80,000 customers across the globe.

Tarboro was chartered by British colonists in 1760. Located in a bend of the Tar River, it was an important river port, the head of navigation on the Tar River just east of the fall line of the Piedmont. As early as the 1730s, a small community developed around this natural asset. With different businesses, a church, a jail, two warehouses, a courthouse, a few well built private houses, together with a score of "plain and cheap" houses, made a bustling village by the late 1700s.

== History ==
Created in 1760, Tarboro is the ninth-oldest incorporated town in North Carolina. Situated on the Tar River at the fall line in the Piedmont, the town served the area as an important colonial river port. It was a thriving trade center until the Civil War.

Scholars believe that the area around Tarboro was settled by 1733, but Edward Moseley's map of that year indicates only Tuscarora Native Americans, an Iroquoian-language speaking group. By 1750, the area was widely known as "Tawboro", a name attributed to Taw, the Tuscaroran word for "river of health".

"Tarrburg", as the town was called on maps of 1770–75, was chartered November 30, 1760, as "Tarborough" by the General Assembly. In September of the same year, Joseph and Ester Howell deeded 150 acres (610,000 m^{2}) of their property to the Reverend James Moir, Lawrence Toole (a merchant), Captains Aquilla Sugg and Elisha Battle, and Benjamin Hart, Esquire, for five shillings and one peppercorn. As commissioners, these men laid out a town with lots not exceeding 0.5 acres (2,000 m^{2}) and streets not wider than 80 feet (24 m), with 12 lots and a 50-acre (200,000 m^{2}) "common" set aside for public use. Lots were to be sold for two pounds, with the proceeds to be turned over to the Howells; however, full payment was not received for all of the 109 lots sold, and some were not sold for the 40 shillings price.

After Halifax County was separated from Edgecombe County in 1758–59, the original county seat of Enfield was within Halifax.

Tarboro officially was designated as the county seat of Edgecombe in 1764. For four years the county government had met in Redman's Field. The North Carolina State Legislature met here once in 1787 and again in 1987. President George Washington is known to have slept in Tarboro during a visit on his 1791 Southern tour. He is noted to have said of the town that it was "as good a salute as could be given with one piece of artillery."

According to the book, Edgecombe County: Twelve North Carolina Counties in 1810–11, by Jeremiah Battle, the following is an 1810 account of the town:

"Tarboro, the only town in the county, is handsomely situated on the south-west bank of Tar River, just above the mouth of Hendrick's Creek, in lat. 35 deg. 45 min. It is forty-eight miles west by north from Washington, thirty-six south of Halifax, eighty-three northwest of Newbern, and sixty-eight east of Raleigh. It was laid off into lots in the year 1760. The streets are seventy-two feet wide, and cross each other at right angles, leaving squares of 2 acres (8,100 m^{2}) each. These squares being divided into lots of 0.5 acres (2,000 m^{2}), makes every lot front or face two streets.

"There are about fifty private houses in it; and generally from fifteen to twenty stores, a church, a jail, two warehouses, and a large Court House, which in the year 1785 was used for the sitting of the State Legislature. There are several good springs adjacent to the town, but for culinary purposes almost every person or family has a well; and some of these wells afford good water the greater part of the year. This place affords good encouragement to all industrious persons, particularly merchants of almost every description. Sixty or seventy merchants have had full employment here at one time. But such of them as have emigrated to this place have too soon found themselves in prosperous situations, and have betaken themselves to idleness and dissipation."

Due to the development of cotton plantations in the uplands, which were worked by slave labor in the antebellum years, by the 1870s Halifax and Edgecombe counties were among several in northeast North Carolina with majority-black populations. Local plantations include Adelphia Plantation. Before being disfranchised by the passage in 1899 of a new state constitutions, black citizens elected four African Americans to the U.S. Congress from North Carolina's 2nd congressional district in the last quarter of the nineteenth century. They also elected many blacks to local offices. Congressman George Henry White, a successful attorney, lived in Tarboro. After passage of the disfranchising constitution, he left the state, stating it was impossible for a black to be a man there. He became a successful banker in Washington, D.C., and Philadelphia, Pennsylvania.

The federal Voting Rights Act of 1965 provided for oversight and enforcement of the constitutional rights of African Americans to vote. They have since been able to participate again in political life in North Carolina.

=== Hurricane Floyd ===
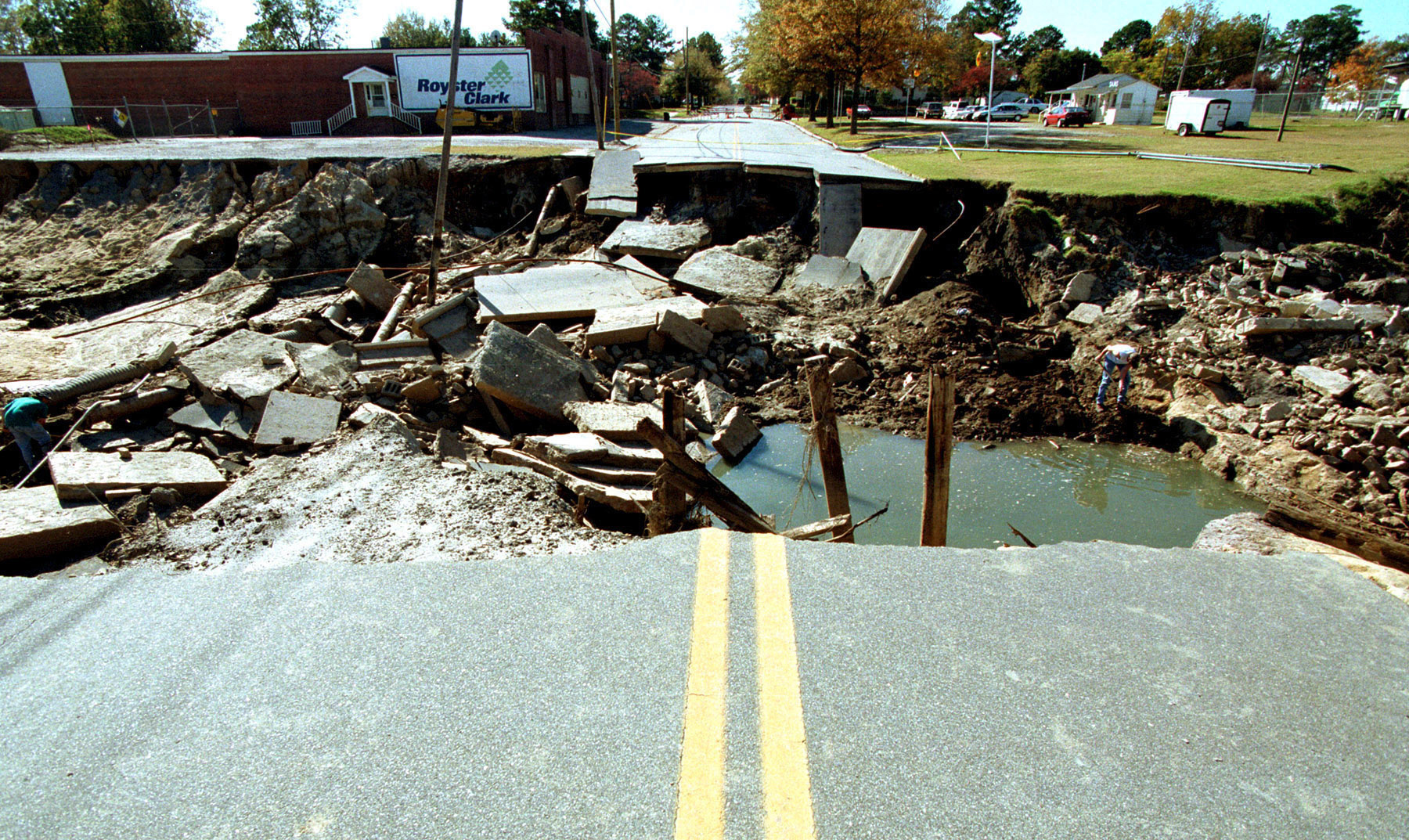
Saint James Street Bridge washed out in Tarboro, North Carolina. FEMA#136, taken by Dave Gatley on November 8, 1999.

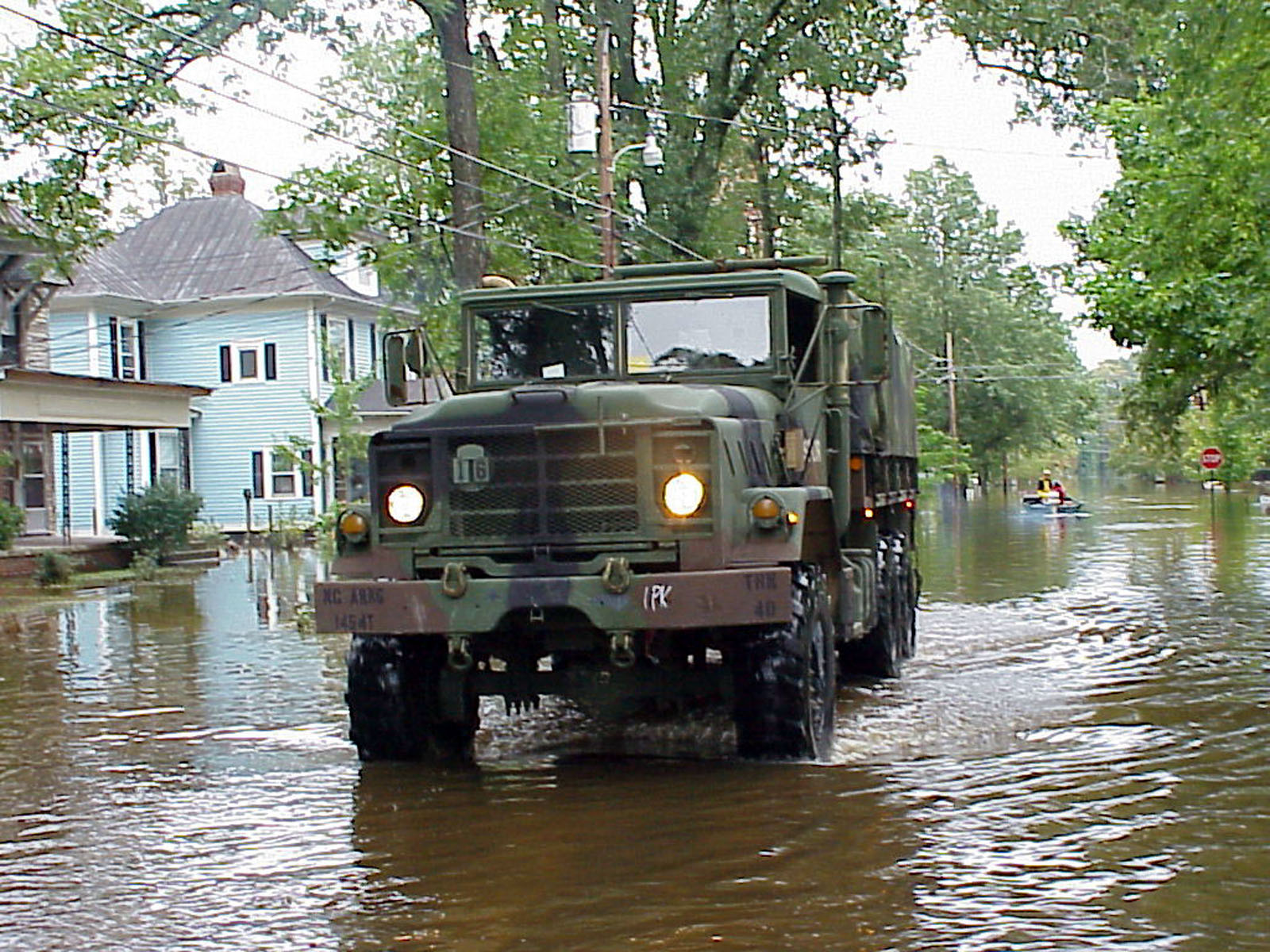
National Guard transporting government documents from flooded building, Tarboro, NC. FEMA#495, taken by Sgt. 1st Class Eric Wedeking September 16, 1999.

Hurricane Floyd was a very powerful Cape Verde-type hurricane that struck the east coast of the United States in 1999. It was the sixth named storm, fourth hurricane, and third major hurricane in the 1999 Atlantic hurricane season. With its approach, officials ordered the third largest evacuation in US history (behind Hurricane Gustav and Hurricane Rita, respectively), and 2.6 million coastal residents of five states were ordered from their homes. The hurricane formed off the coast of Africa and lasted from September 7 to 19, peaking in strength as a very strong Category 4 hurricane—just 2 mph short of the highest possible rating on the Saffir–Simpson Hurricane Scale.

Flooding in Tarboro occurred mostly in areas around the Tar River, which exceeded 500-year flood levels along its lower stretches; it crested 24 ft (7.3 m) above flood stage. The Tar River surrounds about half of Tarboro as both the North end and Southern ends of the city have developed along it. Flooding began upstream in Rocky Mount, where up to 30% of the city was underwater for several days. In Tarboro, much of the downtown became flooded by several feet of water. Nearby, the town of Princeville was largely destroyed when the waters of the Tar poured over the town's levee, covering the town with more than 20 ft (6.1 m) of floodwater for ten days. Part of the Tarboro and Princeville city limits are defined by the Tar River.

== Tarboro Historic District ==
Recognized by the National Park Service in 1977, the 45-block Tarboro Historic District has more than 300 contributing structures, from residences to historic churches to original 19th-century storefronts along Tarboro's Main Street. The gateway to the Tarboro Historic District is the Tarboro Town Common, a 15-acre (61,000 m^{2}) park that has a canopy of tall oaks. War memorials are installed here. The Town Common originally surrounded the town and is the second-oldest legislated town common in the country. Initially the location for common grazing of livestock, community gatherings and military drills, the Town Common is the only remaining original common on the East Coast outside of Boston.

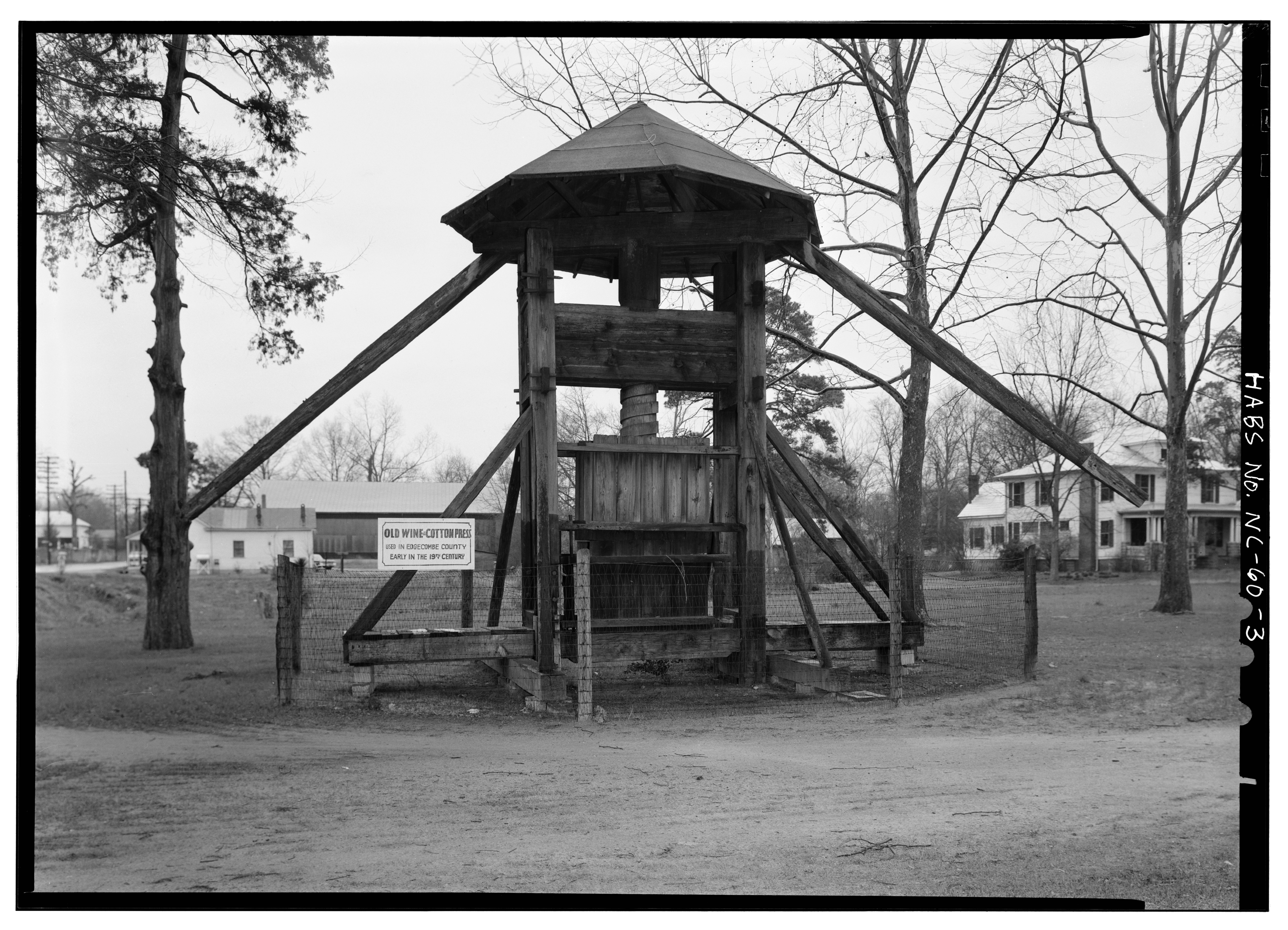
FRONT VIEW – Cotton Press, Albermarle Street (moved from Norfleet Plantation), Tarboro, NC; HABS NC, 33-TARB,2-3

Within the historic district is the Blount-Bridgers House, an 1808 Federal-style mansion that is operated as a museum: it holds several important document collections and works by Hobson Pittman, a nationally recognized artist and Tarboro native. Opened to the public in 1982, the Blount-Bridgers House serves as the town's art and civic center. A self-guided Historic District National Recreation Trail, beginning at the Blount-Bridgers House, leads visitors through the scenic older neighborhoods of the town. The district includes five 18th-century homes, with the oldest being the Archibald White house (ca. 1785) located on the corner of Church and Trade streets. The district has more than two dozen antebellum homes built from 1800 to 1860. The largest section is late 19th-and early 20th-century and includes Victorian, Second Empire, Neo-classical revival, and Arts and Crafts-style homes. The town's walkable downtown is recognized by the National Trust for Historic Preservation's Main Street Program.

Also within the historic district, at the cross of North Church Street and Albemarle Avenue, is the Tarboro-Edgecombe Farmers' Market. The market operates on Tuesdays and Fridays from 7 am to 10 am, and Saturdays from 8 am to 11 am. A variety of events, including the Tarboro Common Arts Festival and the Blueberry Day, are celebrated in downtown.

Additional buildings are listed on the National Register of Historic Places: The Barracks, Batts House and Outbuildings, Calvary Episcopal Church and Churchyard, Coats House, Coolmore Plantation, Cotton Press, Eastern Star Baptist Church, Edgecombe Agricultural Works, Howell Homeplace, Lone Pine, Oakland Plantation, Piney Prospect, Quigless Clinic, Railroad Depot Complex, Redmond-Shackelford House, St. Paul Baptist Church, and Walston-Bulluck House.

== Geography ==
According to the United States Census Bureau, the town has a total area of 11.2 square miles (28.9 km^{2}), of which 11.1 square miles (28.8 km^{2}) is land and 0.04 square miles (0.1 km^{2}), or 0.33%, is water.

== Climate ==
Climate data for TARBORO 1 S, NC, 1991-2020 normals
Month	Jan	Feb	Mar	Apr	May	Jun	Jul	Aug	Sep	Oct	Nov	Dec	Year
Mean daily maximum °F (°C)	51.4 (10.8)	54.7 (12.6)	61.9 (16.6)	71.8 (22.1)	78.8 (26.0)	85.9 (29.9)	89.3 (31.8)	87.3 (30.7)	82.1 (27.8)	73.0 (22.8)	63.1 (17.3)	55.2 (12.9)	71.2 (21.8)
Daily mean °F (°C)	40.8 (4.9)	43.3 (6.3)	50.1 (10.1)	59.4 (15.2)	68.0 (20.0)	75.9 (24.4)	79.8 (26.6)	78.1 (25.6)	72.5 (22.5)	61.6 (16.4)	51.3 (10.7)	44.4 (6.9)	60.4 (15.8)
Mean daily minimum °F (°C)	30.1 (−1.1)	31.9 (−0.1)	38.4 (3.6)	47.0 (8.3)	57.1 (13.9)	65.9 (18.8)	70.3 (21.3)	68.9 (20.5)	62.8 (17.1)	50.2 (10.1)	39.6 (4.2)	33.6 (0.9)	49.7 (9.8)
Average precipitation inches (mm)	3.27 (83)	2.99 (76)	3.71 (94)	3.63 (92)	3.33 (85)	4.27 (108)	4.92 (125)	5.03 (128)	6.22 (158)	3.35 (85)	3.48 (88)	3.39 (86)	47.59 (1,209)
Average snowfall inches (cm)	1.9 (4.8)	0.9 (2.3)	0.1 (0.25)	0.0 (0.0)	0.0 (0.0)	0.0 (0.0)	0.0 (0.0)	0.0 (0.0)	0.0 (0.0)	0.0 (0.0)	0.0 (0.0)	1.9 (4.8)	4.8 (12)
Average precipitation days (≥ 0.01 in)	10.4	9.5	10.8	8.7	9.4	9.7	10.5	10.4	8.9	6.6	8.3	9.9	113.1
Average snowy days (≥ 0.1 in)	1.1	0.5	0.2	0.0	0.0	0.0	0.0	0.0	0.0	0.0	0.0	0.5	2.3
Source: NOAA

== Demographics ==
Historical population
Census	Pop.	Note	%±
1810	523		—
1850	709		—
1860	1,048		47.8%
1870	1,340		27.9%
1880	1,600		19.4%
1890	1,924		20.3%
1900	2,499		29.9%
1910	4,129		65.2%
1920	4,568		10.6%
1930	6,379		39.6%
1940	7,148		12.1%
1950	8,120		13.6%
1960	8,411		3.6%
1970	9,425		12.1%
1980	8,741		−7.3%
1990	11,037		26.3%
2000	11,138		0.9%
2010	11,415		2.5%
2020	10,721		−6.1%
U.S. Decennial Census

=== 2020 census ===
As of the 2020 census, Tarboro had a population of 10,721. The median age was 45.7 years. 20.0% of residents were under the age of 18, and 24.8% were 65 years of age or older. For every 100 females, there were 80.2 males, and for every 100 females age 18 and over, there were 74.8 males age 18 and over.

96.8% of residents lived in urban areas, while 3.2% lived in rural areas.

There were 4,545 households and 2,848 families in Tarboro, of which 27.2% had children under the age of 18 living in them. Of all households, 33.6% were married-couple households, 16.9% were households with a male householder and no spouse or partner present, and 44.4% were households with a female householder and no spouse or partner present. About 35.5% of all households were made up of individuals, and 17.8% had someone living alone who was 65 years of age or older.

There were 5,058 housing units, of which 10.1% were vacant. The homeowner vacancy rate was 2.3%, and the rental vacancy rate was 4.0%.

Tarboro racial composition
Race	Number	Percentage
White (non-Hispanic)	4,371	40.77%
Black or African American (non-Hispanic)	5,411	50.47%
Native American	26	0.24%
Asian	56	0.52%
Pacific Islander	28	0.03%
Other/Mixed	320	2.98%
Hispanic or Latino	537	5.01%

=== 2010 census ===
As of the census of 2010, there were 11,415 people, 4,565 households, and 2,958 families residing in the town. The population density was 1,025.3 inhabitants per square mile (395.9/km^{2}). There were 4,993 housing units at an average density of 448.5 per square mile (173.2/km^{2}). The racial makeup of the town was 47.2% White, 48.4% African American, 0.1% Native American, 0.5% Asian, 0.1% Pacific Islander, 2.9% some other race, and 0.8% from two or more races. 4.9% of the population were Hispanic or Latino of any race.

There were 4,565 households, out of which 30.5% had children under the age of 18 living with them, 38.5% were headed by married couples living together, 22.1% had a female householder with no husband present, and 35.2% were non-families. 31.5% of all households were made up of individuals, and 15.1% were someone living alone who was 65 years of age or older. The average household size was 2.35, and the average family size was 2.94.

In the town, the population was spread out, with 22.8% under the age of 18, 8.1% from 18 to 24, 22.1% from 25 to 44, 27.9% from 45 to 64, and 19.1% who were 65 years of age or older. The median age was 42.3 years. For every 100 females, there were 84.1 males. For every 100 females age 18 and over, there were 79.3 males.

For the period 2010–14, the estimated median annual income for a household in the town was $34,267, and the median income for a family was $46,884. Male full-time workers had a median income of $32,776, versus $35,013 for females. The per capita income for the town was $20,085. 16.0% of the population and 12.0% of families were below the poverty line. Out of the total population, 28.9% of those under the age of 18 and 11.7% of those 65 and older were living below the poverty line.

== Economy ==
Chinese tiremaker Triangle Group will be building two manufacturing facilities at a 1,449-acre site in Edgecombe County at Kingsboro Business Park, located between Rocky Mount and Tarboro. Phase 1 of the project is set to open in 2020 and phase 2 in 2022. At $580 million, it will be the largest ever manufacturing investment in rural North Carolina with the creation of 800 jobs and an estimated contribution of more than $2.4 billion to the state's economy. Corning has also constructed a new $86 million distribution center that will bring 111 new jobs, they will be operational in the first quarter 2020.

=== Largest employers ===
Below is a list of some of the largest employers in Tarboro as of 2019.

#	Employer	No. of employees
1	Edgecombe County Public Schools	1,100
2	Sara Lee Frozen Bakery	950
3	Edgecombe County	500-999
4	Johnson Controls	250-499
5	Vidant Edgecombe Hospital	500-999
6	Keihin Carolina System Technology	250-499
7	Barnhill Contracting	100-249
8	LS Cable	100-249
9	Town of Tarboro	100-249

== Education ==
Edgecombe County Public Schools' headquarters are located in Tarboro, and the schools serve all cities and towns of the county. ECPS operates a total of 15 public schools: 6 elementary schools, 4 middle schools, and 5 high schools. Tarboro is home to seven of the public schools: Stocks Elementary, Princeville Elementary, Pattillo Middle School, Martin Millennium Academy, Edgecombe Early College High School, North Edgecombe High School and Tarboro High School. There is one public charter school in Tarboro, North East Carolina Prep School.

Higher education is provided by Edgecombe Community College. ECC offers more than 130 academic degrees, diplomas, and certificates. Edgecombe also operates a separate campus in nearby Rocky Mount.

== Government ==
The town of Tarboro has a council-manager form of government. The town is divided into eight wards with a total of eight council members that serve members of the town's council are elected from the town's eight wards for four-year staggered terms. The mayor serves a four-year term. As of 2025, the town manager is Troy R. Lewis.

=== Council members ===
- Tate Mayo (Mayor)
- Othar Woodard, Ward 1
- Leo Taylor, Ward 2
- Steve Burnette, Ward 3
- C. B. Brown, Ward 4
- Mears Pitt, Ward 5 (Mayor Pro-Tem)
- Deborah Jordan, Ward 6
- Sabrina Bynum, Ward 7
- Cutchin Anderson, Ward 8

== Infrastructure ==
=== Transportation ===
Interstate 95 and U.S. Route 64 were constructed near Tarboro, allowing for access to and from the East Coast's major markets, many of which are within one day's drive. The city is 72 miles (116 km) east of Raleigh, the state capital; 25 miles (40 km) northwest of Greenville, a primary eastern North Carolina hub; 16 miles (26 km) east of Rocky Mount; and 120 miles (190 km) west of the Outer Banks. Tarboro is convenient to area and regional airports, freight and passenger train service, interstate and intrastate highway systems, and the deepwater ports of Morehead City and Wilmington, North Carolina.

==== Major highways ====
- US 64: Four-laned from Tarboro west to Raleigh, and four-laned from Tarboro east to North Carolina's Outer Banks.
- US 258: A major north-south link between the Norfolk area and Jacksonville, North Carolina.
- I-95: Located 22 miles (35 km) west of Tarboro (accessed via four-laned U.S. 64), this major interstate provides access to Washington, D.C., New York City, the Northeast, and Florida.

==== Airports ====
Tarboro-Edgecombe Airport: This facility, located 3 miles (5 km) north of downtown, has a 4,500-foot (1,400 m) paved and lighted runway with a 1,000-foot (300 m) approach apron from both ends, accommodating a wide variety of small general aviation aircraft.

Pitt–Greenville Airport: Located 25 miles (40 km) south of Tarboro, this airport has a 6,000-foot (1,800 m) lighted precision approach runway, a 5,000-foot (1,500 m) lighted non-precision crosswind runway and a 2,700-foot (820 m) unlighted visual approach runway. PGV provides commuter service to Charlotte Douglas International Airport through US Airways Express with 11 daily flights. Jet service is available. All aircraft services are available, including charters.

Rocky Mount-Wilson Airport: Located 25 miles (40 km) west of Tarboro, this airport has one runway which is lighted and extends a length of 7,100 feet (2,200 m).

Raleigh–Durham International Airport: More commonly known as RDU, this major international airport serves the U.S. and abroad. Located 87 miles (140 km) west of Tarboro, RDU hosts numerous major carriers with daily departures. Additionally, numerous commuter carriers connect RDU to the northeast and other southern cities.

==== Rail ====
Tarboro has access to both freight and passenger rail service. Amtrak provides two north and two southbound trains per day at its Rocky Mount station, located 17 miles (27 km) west of Tarboro. Service is to Washington, D.C., New York City, Miami and Philadelphia. Freight service is provided by CSX. Trains travel to destinations in eastern North Carolina and also to points west and south of town.

=== Health care ===
ECU Health Edgecombe Hospital is a full-service, 117-bed acute care facility where residents of Tarboro, Edgecombe County and surrounding communities receive a wide range of health services close to home. In 1998, Heritage joined University Health Systems of Eastern Carolina which is now ECU Health. More than 20 specialties are represented by ECU Health Edgecombe Hospital's medical staff. In addition to acute care, services include rehabilitation, oncology and outpatient clinics.

== Media ==
The Tarboro Weekly and Tar River Times serves as the main daily newspapers for the town of Tarboro and surrounding areas. The Daily Southerner was the main daily newspaper for the town of Tarboro and Edgecombe County from 1826 until it ceased publication on May 30, 2014.

The Rocky Mount Telegram also serves the town of Tarboro and the entire Rocky Mount metropolitan area.

== Notable people ==
- Watson Brown, photographer
- Kelvin Bryant, retired NFL running back who was 3 time All-ACC at North Carolina.
- Mike Caldwell, MLB player
- Elijah Clarke, Revolutionary War hero and namesake of Clarke County, Georgia
- Shaun Draughn, NFL running back for the San Francisco 49ers.
- L. H. Fountain, congressman
- Willie H. Fuller, combat fighter pilot, and combat flight instructor with the 332nd Fighter Group's 99th Pursuit Squadron, best known as the Tuskegee Airmen or "Red Tails"
- Todd Gurley, NFL running back, 3x Pro Bowl selection and 2x First-team All-Pro
- Brian Hargrove, television writer/producer
- Montrezl Harrell, NBA player for the Philadelphia 76ers
- Janice Bryant Howroyd, first African American woman to build and own a billion dollar company
- Ben Jones, politician, actor
- Joshua Lawrence (1778–1843), influential Baptist minister in the early 19th century
- Derrick Lewis, professional basketball player
- Tyquan Lewis, NFL defensive lineman
- Jim Phillips Sr., North Carolina state senator
- General Hugh Shelton, former chairman of the Joint Chiefs of Staff
- Hubert Simmons, Negro league baseball player for the Baltimore Elite Giants
- Joseph K. Spiers, U.S. Air Force general
- Adolphus Staton, U.S. Navy rear admiral
- Trent Tucker, former NBA player
- Harvie Ward, former professional golfer best known for his amateur career
- Almyra Maynard Watson (1917–2018), officer in the United States Army Nurse Corps
- Ed Weeks, set numerous records for growing large vegetables
- Milton Moran Weston II, activist, clergyman, businessman
- George Henry White, African-American attorney and last black U.S. Congressman elected from North Carolina in the 19th century
- Burgess Whitehead, MLB second baseman
