= Mercer, North Carolina =

Unincorporated community in North Carolina, US

Coordinates: 35°50′13″N 77°41′35″W

Mercer (formerly, Mercersville) is an unincorporated community in southwestern Edgecombe County, North Carolina, United States. It lies at an elevation of 115 feet (35 m). Dr. A. B. Nobles House and McKendree Church was listed on the National Register of Historic Places in 1982.
