= Fountain Correctional Center for Women =

Women's prison in Edgecombe County, North Carolina

Coordinates: 35°59′49″N 77°46′13″W

Fountain Correctional Center for Women was a women's prison in unincorporated Edgecombe County, North Carolina, near Rocky Mount. It was operated by the North Carolina Department of Correction and later the North Carolina Department of Public Safety.

The prisoners were often used to clean up litter around the Rocky Mount area.

In May 2014 Governor of North Carolina Pat McCrory passed budget recommendations that asked for the closure of this prison. This prison and the North Piedmont Correctional Center for Women were to be closed because of a decline in the number of female prisoners. The women were to be moved to the North Carolina Eastern Correctional Institution in Maury, which was to be converted into a women's facility.

Fountain closed in December 2014.

== See also ==
- List of North Carolina state prisons
