= Calvary Episcopal Church and Churchyard (Tarboro, North Carolina) =

Historic church in North Carolina, United States

- U.S. National Register of Historic Places
- U.S. Historic district – Contributing property
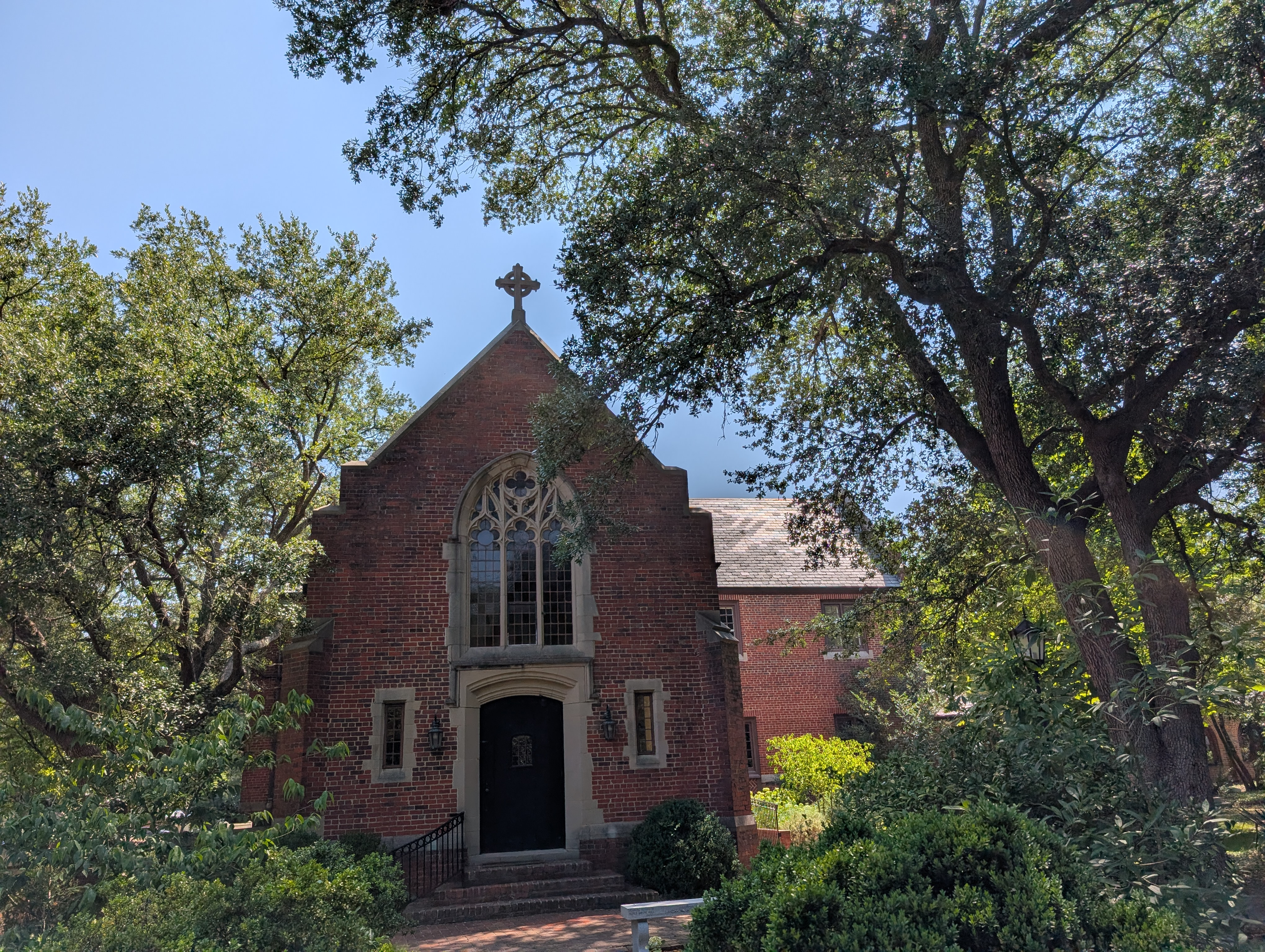

- Location within North Carolina Location within the United States
- Location: 411 E. Church St., Tarboro, North Carolina
- Coordinates: 35°53′51″N 77°31′56″W
- Area: 2 acres (0.81 ha)
- Built: 1860-1867, 1922
- Architect: Percival, William; Upjohn, Hobart
- Architectural style: Gothic Revival, "Early English" Gothic
- NRHP reference No.: 71000580
- Added to NRHP: February 18, 1971

Calvary Episcopal Church and Churchyard is a historic Episcopal church located at 411 E. Church Street in Tarboro, Edgecombe County, North Carolina. The church was built between 1860 and 1867, and is a one-story, rectangular Gothic Revival style building. Attached to the church is a Parish House built in 1922, and designed by architect Hobart Upjohn. Located adjacent to the church is an arboretum dating to 1842, that includes number of gravestones. Notable burials include Gen. William Dorsey Pender (1834–1863) and author William L. Saunders (1835–1891).

It was listed on the National Register of Historic Places in 1971. It is located in the Tarboro Historic District.

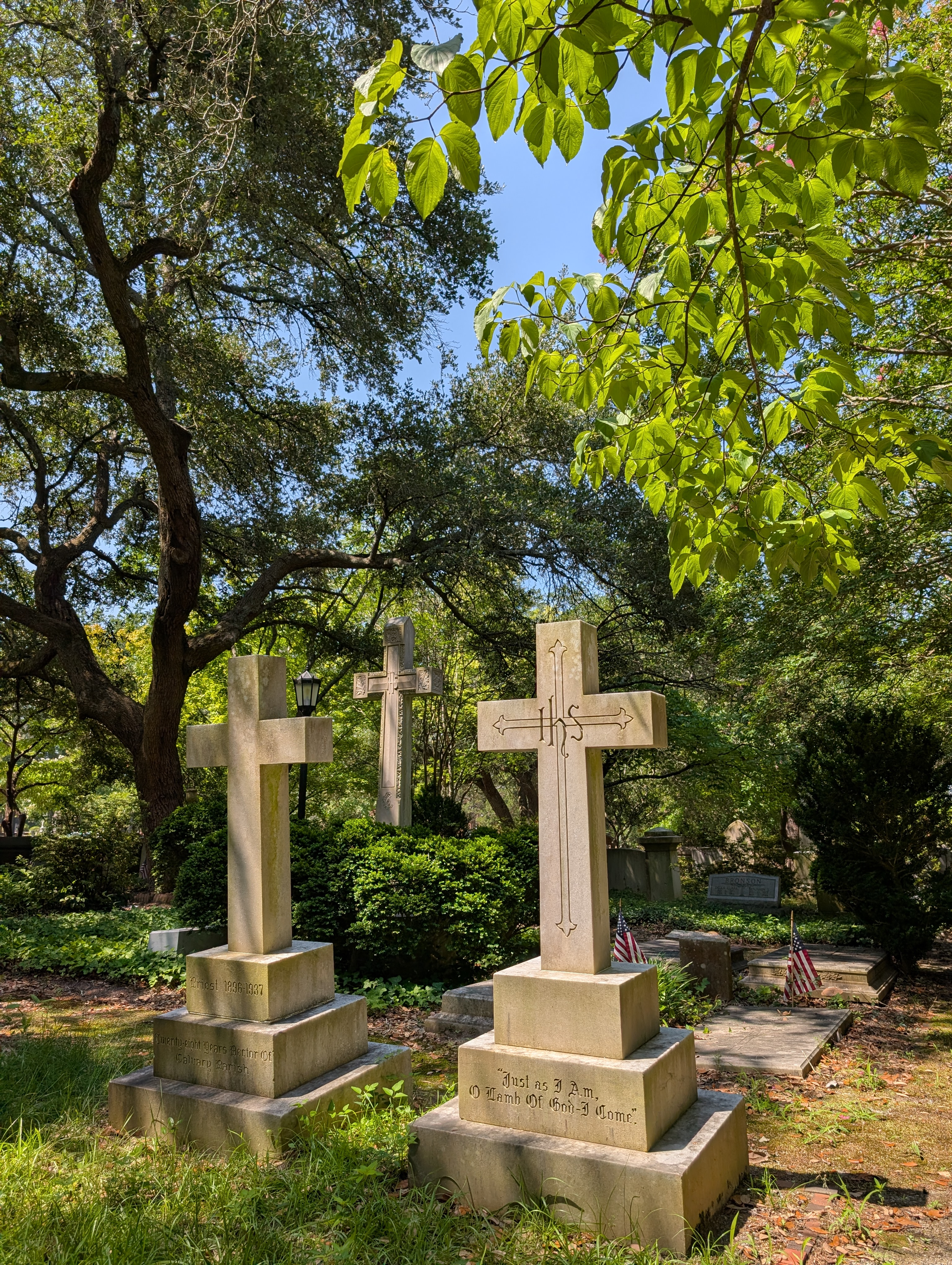
Several gravestones in the Churchyard
