= Tar River =

River in North Carolina

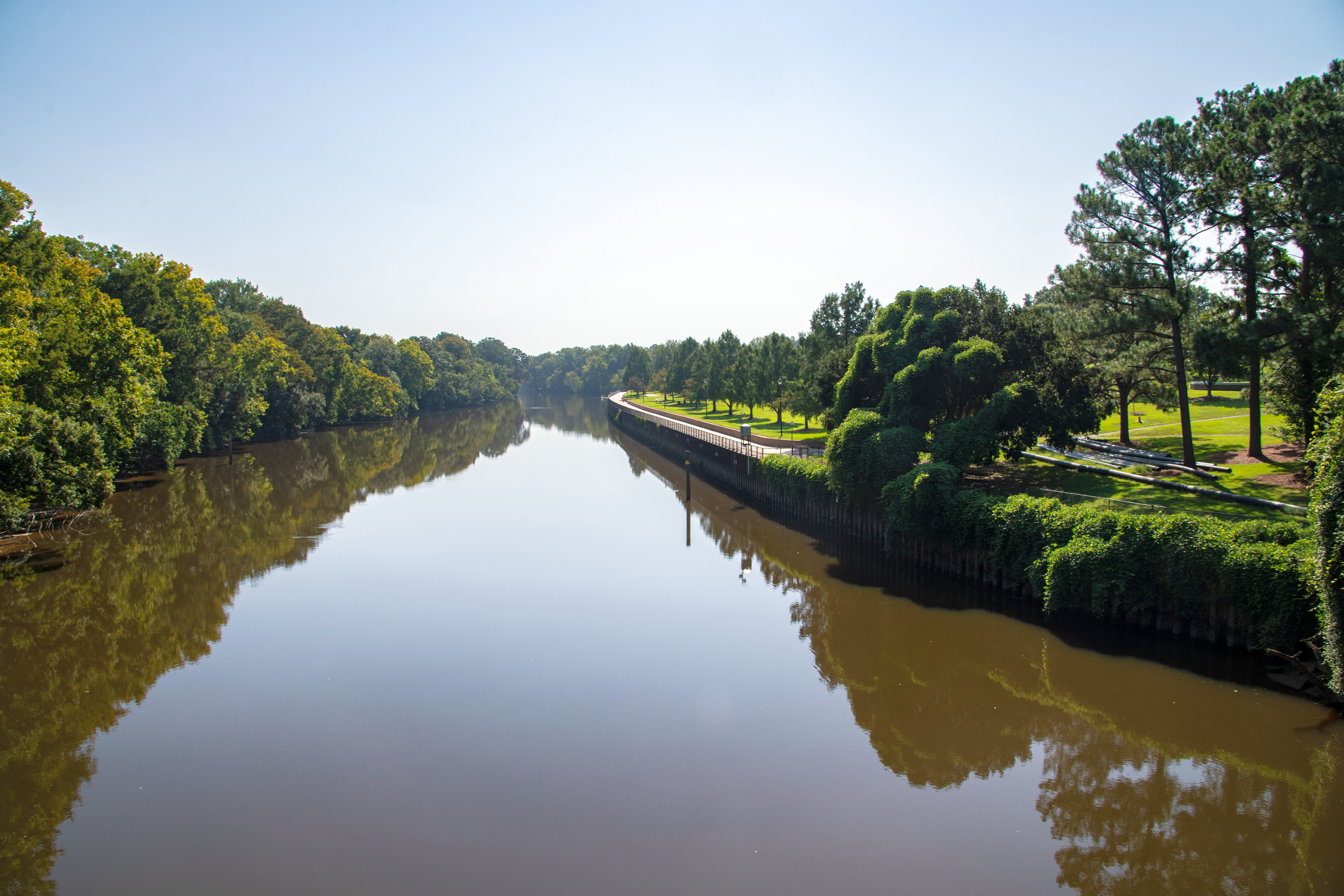
- Tar River next to East Carolina University in Greenville, North Carolina

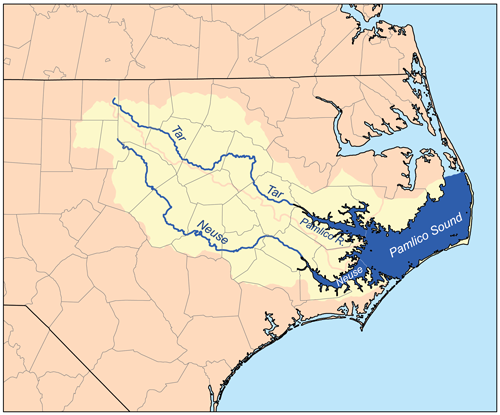
- Map of the Pamlico Sound watershed, including the Pamlico, Tar, and Neuse rivers.

Location
- Country: United States
- State: North Carolina
- Region: South
- Cities: Louisburg, North Carolina, Rocky Mount, North Carolina, Tarboro, North Carolina, Greenville, North Carolina, Washington, North Carolina

Physical characteristics
- Source: a freshwater spring
  - location: Person County, North Carolina, United States
  - coordinates: 36°24′54″N 78°49′15″W
  - elevation: 715 ft (218 m)
- Mouth: Pamlico Sound (as the Pamlico River)
  - location: Lowland, North Carolina, United States
  - coordinates: 35°20′08″N 76°28′20″W
  - elevation: −13 ft (−4.0 m)
- Length: 346 km (215 mi)
- Basin size: 15,920 km^{2} (6,150 sq mi)

The Tar River is a river that is approximately 215 miles (346 km) long, in northeast North Carolina flowing generally southeast to an estuary of Pamlico Sound. The Tar River becomes the tidal Pamlico River once it passes under the U.S. Highway 17 Bridge in Washington, North Carolina. Overfishing, pollution, climate change, and other human impacts on the ecosystem have led to the decline of the populations of some species native to the river.

North Carolina was originally a naval stores colony—that is, the blanket of longleaf pines that covered the coastal plain was used by the British Navy for ships' masts and the pine pitch was used to manufacture tar caulking for vessels. The river derives its name from its historic use as a major route for tar-laden barges as they headed to the sea. The city of Tarboro is on the banks of the river. Recent research conducted by East Carolina University, Greenville and Pitt County historians has uncovered documentation noting that before the Civil War, the North Carolina Legislature had appropriated funds to construct dams and locks on the Tar River in an attempt to facilitate almost year-round navigation for the farm products and naval stores shipping plus passenger boats which were travelling between Tarboro, Greenville, and Washington.

Among the towns and cities along its course are Louisburg, Rocky Mount, Tarboro, and Greenville. The village of Old Sparta was formerly an important riverport on the Tar, but declined in the 20th century.

One account of the significance of the river's name comes from the Civil War.

It may have been inspired by an incident back in North Carolina. As the Confederates prepared to evacuate Washington, NC, in March 1862, they sent squads up and down the Tar River to destroy all the stocks of cotton and naval stores which had been prepared by the small farms along the river, to prevent them from falling into the hands of the Union soldiers. At Taft’s store they found over 1,000 barrels of turpentine and tar. The amount was too large to burn, as it would take several houses with it. So the barrels were rolled into the river, where the hoops were cut in two and the contents dumped into the river. Three months later, in June, four hundred Union prisoners of war were sent from Salisbury, NC to Washington, NC, to be exchanged for Confederate prisoners. Before coming into Washington, the soldiers asked permission to bathe in the river and clean themselves up. Guards were posted along the river banks, and the prisoners were allowed to strip then wade into the river to wash. Instead, they stirred up the river bottom so much that the tar smeared their bodies completely, each man coming out of the water with a stick to scour the tar off their bodies and legs. One Confederate yelled out, "Hello boys, what’s the matter?" The reply from the disgusted Yankee soldier was, "We have heard of Tar River all our lives but never believed that there really was any such place, but damned if we haven’t found it, the whole bed of it is tar!"

The river was strongly affected by Hurricane Floyd in 1999 and caused much flooding in the area. The Tar River suffered the worst flooding from the hurricane, exceeding 500-year flood levels along its lower stretches; it crested 24 feet (7.3 m) above flood stage. In Greenville it crested at 29.74 ft. (9.1 m)

The river was again affected by Hurricane Matthew in 2016. It crested as much as 24.5 feet (7.5 m) above flood stage in some areas for up to 3 days.

An endangered species, the Tar River Spinymussel, is found in limited areas of the Tar and Neuse River basins.

== Human impacts ==
Populations of aquatic species in the Tar River have decreased due to overfishing, river alterations, pollution, habitat loss, invasive species, land cover conversion, and climate change. The Neuse River Waterdog (Necturus lewisi) is a species of aquatic salamander only found in the Tar and Neuse River basins. Historical surveys analyzed by North Carolina State University suggest that the species occupied about 35% fewer sites in 2015 than 1980, and the US Fish and Wildlife Service listed the Neuse River Waterdog as threatened in 2021. The largest threat to the species is habitat degradation, but pollution, invasive species, concentrated animal feeding operations (CAFOs), land cover conversion, climate change, and dams have also been cited as factors of the population's decline. Increasing water temperatures in the Tar River, which threaten local species, have been attributed to "global change" by the North Carolina Cooperative Fish and Wildlife Research Unit. Sites of the Tar River where freshwater mussels are found have reached temperatures that cause harm to the mussel larvae and juveniles in laboratory tests. Additionally, populations of River Herring (Blueback Herring [Alosa aestivalis] and Alewife [A. pseudoharengus]) have declined in the area because of habitat loss, overfishing, and river alterations.

The increase of impervious surfaces in Greenville has been linked to increased peak river flows and reduced flood retention. It has also been related to increased nitrogen runoff, likely from lawns.

Sound Rivers is an environmental organization dedicated to the protection of the Tar and Neuse watersheds that maintains fifteen camping platforms and campsites for recreation along the course of the Tar-Pamlico Water Trail.
