= Edgecombe County, North Carolina =

County in North Carolina, United States

- County
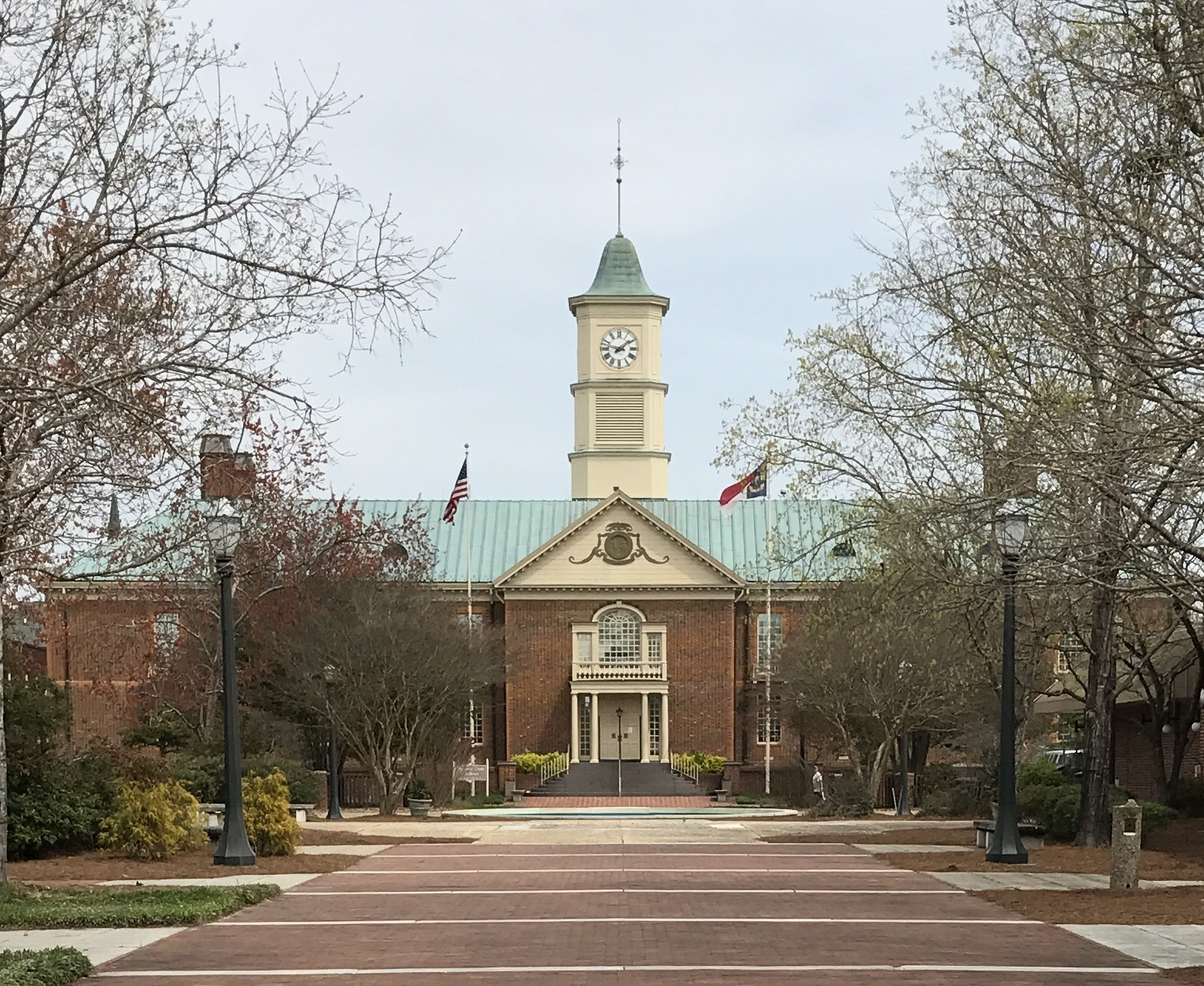
- Edgecombe County Courthouse

- Seal Logo

- Location within the U.S. state of North Carolina
- Interactive map of Edgecombe County, North Carolina
- Coordinates: 35.92°N 77.60°W
- Country: United States
- State: North Carolina
- Founded: 1741
- Named for: Richard Edgcumbe
- Seat: Tarboro
- Largest community: Rocky Mount

Area
  - Total: 506.87 sq mi (1,312.8 km^{2})
  - Land: 505.44 sq mi (1,309.1 km^{2})
  - Water: 1.43 sq mi (3.7 km^{2}) 0.28%

Population (2020)
  - Total: 48,900
  - Estimate (2025): 49,121 ▲
  - Density: 96.75/sq mi (37.36/km^{2})
- Time zone: UTC−5 (Eastern)
  - Summer (DST): UTC−4 (EDT)
- Congressional district: 1st
- Website: www.edgecombecountync.gov

Edgecombe County (/ˈɛdʒkəm/ EJ-kum or /ˈɛdʒkoʊm/ EJ-kohm) is a county located in the U.S. state of North Carolina. As of the 2020 census, the population was 48,900. Its county seat is Tarboro.

Edgecombe County is part of the Rocky Mount, NC Metropolitan Statistical Area.

== History ==
This area eventually comprising Edgecombe County was historically home to the Tuscarora, a Native American people. The first European settlers arrived in the Tar River region in the mid-1730s. On May 16, 1732, Royal Governor of the Province of North Carolina George Burrington, in response to a petition and with the consent of his council, authorized for the representation of an Edgecombe Precinct in the North Carolina General Assembly, named in honor of British politician Richard Edgcumbe. This decision was vetoed by the assembly and subsequently debated for several years. In 1741, the assembly acceded to the creation of the precinct. The reason for why the eventual county's name is spelled differently than the honoree's name or when this discrepancy came into practice is unknown.

In 1746 part of Edgecombe County became Granville County. In 1758 a portion, including the county seat of Enfield, became Halifax County, while another portion in the south became part of Dobbs County. In 1777 yet another part became Nash County.

In 1763 the county seat was designated at the town of Tarboro. The first U.S. Census in 1790 recorded a total population of 10,255. In 1840 the Wilmington and Raleigh Railroad—later renamed the Wilmington and Weldon Railroad—was completed with a line through the county, which spurred the development of the communities of Rocky Mount, Battleboro, and Sharpsburg. By 1850, the county produced significant amounts of cotton and recorded a population 17,189. In 1855, parts of Nash, Edgecombe, Johnston, and Wayne counties were combined to form Wilson County.

At the onset of the American Civil War, secessionist sentiment predominated in Edgecombe. From its population six companies were raised for service with the Confederate States Army. In 1863, federal forces conducted a raid on Rocky Mount, destroying railroad infrastructure and several industrial sites. Another federal incursion in December 1864 led to significant damage to property in the county east of Tarboro. In the aftermath of the war, the economy of eastern North Carolina was adversely affected. In the Reconstruction era, freedmen gained political power and, as a result, three black men were elected to the North Carolina General Assembly between 1868 and 1872 and black people held significant influence in local government. In 1871, after significant political controversy, all parts of Edgecombe County west of the Wilmington and Weldon Railroad were annexed to Nash leading to the bifurcation of the Edgecombe communities of Battleboro and Sharpsburg between the two counties. In 1883, the county was reduced to its present dimensions when part of it was annexed to Wilson.

From the Reconstruction era until the Great Depression in the 1930s, the county experienced demographic increases and the development of industry.

== Geography ==
According to the U.S. Census Bureau, the county has a total area of 506.87 square miles (1,312.8 km^{2}), of which 505.44 square miles (1,309.1 km^{2}) is land and 1.43 square miles (3.7 km^{2}) (0.28%) is water.

=== State and local protected areas ===
- Lower Fishing Creek Game Land (part)
- Tar River Game Land

=== Major water bodies ===
- Cokey Swamp
- Deep Creek
- Fishing Creek
- Swift Creek
- Tar River
- Town Creek

=== Adjacent counties ===
- Halifax County – north
- Martin County – east
- Pitt County – south-southeast
- Wilson County – southwest
- Nash County – west

=== Major highways ===
- Future I-87
- US 13
- US 64
- US 64 Alt. (Princeville)
- US 64 Alt. (Rocky Mount)
- US 258
- US 301
- NC 11
- NC 33
- NC 42
- NC 43
- NC 43 Bus.
- NC 97
- NC 111
- NC 122
- NC 124
- NC 142

=== Major infrastructure ===
- Carolina Connector Intermodal Terminal, owned by CSX Transportation
- Rocky Mount Station

== Demographics ==
Historical population
| Census | Pop. | Note | %± |
|---|---|---|---|
| 1790 | 10,265 | | — |
| 1800 | 10,421 | | 1.5% |
| 1810 | 12,423 | | 19.2% |
| 1820 | 13,276 | | 6.9% |
| 1830 | 14,935 | | 12.5% |
| 1840 | 15,708 | | 5.2% |
| 1850 | 17,189 | | 9.4% |
| 1860 | 17,376 | | 1.1% |
| 1870 | 22,970 | | 32.2% |
| 1880 | 26,181 | | 14.0% |
| 1890 | 24,113 | | −7.9% |
| 1900 | 26,591 | | 10.3% |
| 1910 | 32,010 | | 20.4% |
| 1920 | 37,995 | | 18.7% |
| 1930 | 47,894 | | 26.1% |
| 1940 | 49,162 | | 2.6% |
| 1950 | 51,634 | | 5.0% |
| 1960 | 54,226 | | 5.0% |
| 1970 | 52,341 | | −3.5% |
| 1980 | 55,988 | | 7.0% |
| 1990 | 56,558 | | 1.0% |
| 2000 | 55,606 | | −1.7% |
| 2010 | 56,552 | | 1.7% |
| 2020 | 48,900 | | −13.5% |
| 2025 (est.) | 49,121 | ▲ | 0.5% |
U.S. Decennial Census; 1790–1960 1900–1990; 1990–2000 2010 2020

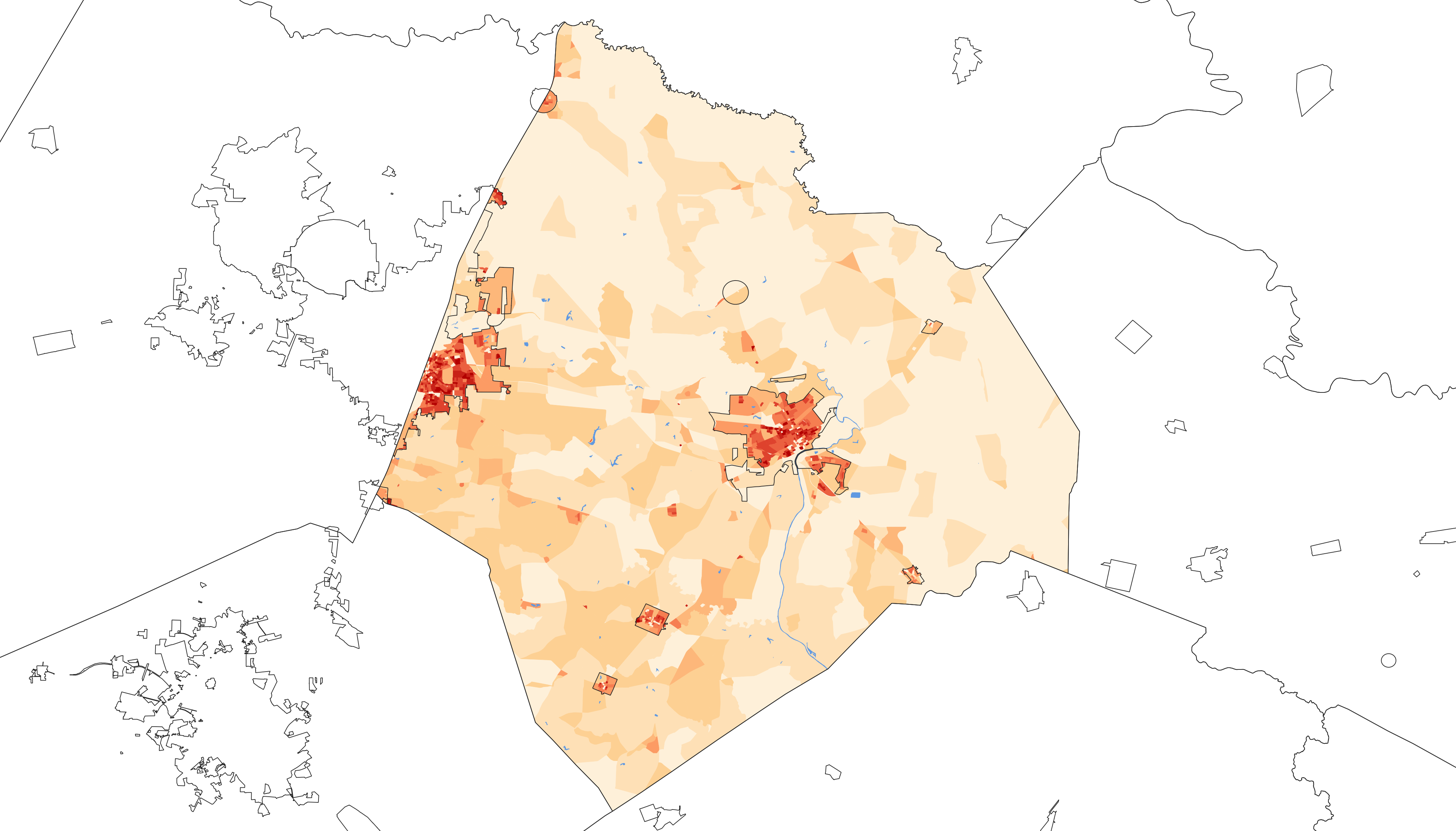
2020 population density of Edgecombe County NC by census block

=== 2020 census ===
Edgecombe County, North Carolina – Racial and ethnic composition Note: the US Census treats Hispanic/Latino as an ethnic category. This table excludes Latinos from the racial categories and assigns them to a separate category. Hispanics/Latinos may be of any race.
| Race / Ethnicity (NH = Non-Hispanic) | Pop 1980 | Pop 1990 | Pop 2000 | Pop 2010 | Pop 2020 | % 1980 | % 1990 | % 2000 | % 2010 | % 2020 |
|---|---|---|---|---|---|---|---|---|---|---|
| White alone (NH) | 27,274 | 24,581 | 21,838 | 21,360 | 17,340 | 48.71% | 43.46% | 39.27% | 37.77% | 35.46% |
| Black or African American alone (NH) | 28,116 | 31,565 | 31,790 | 32,318 | 27,299 | 50.22% | 55.81% | 57.17% | 57.15% | 55.83% |
| Native American or Alaska Native alone (NH) | 30 | 72 | 92 | 128 | 128 | 0.05% | 0.13% | 0.17% | 0.23% | 0.26% |
| Asian alone (NH) | 60 | 64 | 62 | 113 | 112 | 0.11% | 0.11% | 0.11% | 0.20% | 0.23% |
| Native Hawaiian or Pacific Islander alone (NH) | x | x | 1 | 7 | 9 | x | x | 0.00% | 0.01% | 0.02% |
| Other race alone (NH) | 24 | 21 | 18 | 45 | 138 | 0.04% | 0.04% | 0.03% | 0.08% | 0.28% |
| Mixed race or Multiracial (NH) | x | x | 251 | 477 | 1,168 | x | x | 0.45% | 0.84% | 2.39% |
| Hispanic or Latino (any race) | 484 | 255 | 1,554 | 2,104 | 2,706 | 0.86% | 0.45% | 2.79% | 3.72% | 5.53% |
| Total | 55,988 | 56,558 | 55,606 | 56,552 | 48,900 | 100.00% | 100.00% | 100.00% | 100.00% | 100.00% |

As of the 2020 census, there were 48,900 people, 19,971 households, and 14,408 families residing in the county. The median age was 43.2 years, 21.9% of residents were under the age of 18, and 20.9% of residents were 65 years of age or older. For every 100 females there were 87.5 males, and for every 100 females age 18 and over there were 82.9 males age 18 and over.

Of the 19,971 households, 29.1% had children under the age of 18 living in them, 35.0% were married-couple households, 18.9% were households with a male householder and no spouse or partner present, and 39.6% were households with a female householder and no spouse or partner present. About 30.8% of all households were made up of individuals and 14.9% had someone living alone who was 65 years of age or older. There were 23,059 housing units, of which 13.4% were vacant; among occupied housing units, 59.0% were owner-occupied and 41.0% were renter-occupied. The homeowner vacancy rate was 1.8% and the rental vacancy rate was 7.3%.

The racial makeup of the county was 36.1% White, 56.1% Black or African American, 0.4% American Indian and Alaska Native, 0.2% Asian, <0.1% Native Hawaiian and Pacific Islander, 3.8% from some other race, and 3.4% from two or more races. Hispanic or Latino residents of any race comprised 5.5% of the population.

55.2% of residents lived in urban areas, while 44.8% lived in rural areas.

=== 2010 census ===
At the 2010 census, there were 56,552 people living in the county. 57.4% were Black or African American, 38.8% White, 0.3% Native American, 0.2% Asian, 2.3% of some other race and 1.0% of two or more races. 3.7% were Hispanic or Latino (of any race).

=== 2000 census ===
At the 2000 census, there were 55,606 people, 20,392 households, and 14,804 families living in the county. The population density was 110 people per square mile (42 people/km^{2}). There were 24,002 housing units at an average density of 48 units per square mile (19 units/km^{2}). The racial makeup of the county was 57.46% Black or African American, 40.06% White, 0.20% Native American, 0.13% Asian, 0.01% Pacific Islander, 1.56% from other races, and 0.58% from two or more races. 2.79% of the population were Hispanic or Latino of any race.

There were 20,392 households, out of which 32.80% had children under the age of 18 living with them, 46.20% were married couples living together, 21.50% had a female householder with no husband present, and 27.40% were non-families. 24.00% of all households were made up of individuals, and 10.10% had someone living alone who was 65 years of age or older. The average household size was 2.67 and the average family size was 3.16.

In the county, the population was spread out, with 27.10% under the age of 18, 8.60% from 18 to 24, 28.40% from 25 to 44, 23.40% from 45 to 64, and 12.50% who were 65 years of age or older. The median age was 36 years. For every 100 females there were 86.80 males. For every 100 females age 18 and over, there were 80.80 males.

The median income for a household in the county was $30,983, and the median income for a family was $35,902. Males had a median income of $27,300 versus $21,649 for females. The per capita income for the county was $14,435. About 16.00% of families and 19.60% of the population were below the poverty line, including 27.50% of those under age 18 and 18.40% of those age 65 or over.

== Government and politics ==
Edgecombe County is a member of the regional Upper Coastal Plain Council of Governments.

The North Carolina Department of Corrections previously operated the Fountain Correctional Center for Women in an unincorporated area in the county, near Rocky Mount. It closed in December 2014.

United States presidential election results for Edgecombe County, North Carolina
| Year | Republican | | Democratic | | Third party(ies) | |
| Year | No. | % | No. | % | No. | % |
|---|---|---|---|---|---|---|
| 1912 | 102 | 4.91% | 1,851 | 89.03% | 126 | 6.06% |
| 1916 | 135 | 6.17% | 2,028 | 92.69% | 25 | 1.14% |
| 1920 | 24 | 0.71% | 3,343 | 99.29% | 0 | 0.00% |
| 1924 | 171 | 6.70% | 2,274 | 89.04% | 109 | 4.27% |
| 1928 | 977 | 18.93% | 4,184 | 81.07% | 0 | 0.00% |
| 1932 | 248 | 4.04% | 5,872 | 95.62% | 21 | 0.34% |
| 1936 | 266 | 3.83% | 6,684 | 96.17% | 0 | 0.00% |
| 1940 | 316 | 4.03% | 7,516 | 95.97% | 0 | 0.00% |
| 1944 | 448 | 6.21% | 6,762 | 93.79% | 0 | 0.00% |
| 1948 | 478 | 6.69% | 6,410 | 89.75% | 254 | 3.56% |
| 1952 | 1,927 | 18.47% | 8,504 | 81.53% | 0 | 0.00% |
| 1956 | 1,840 | 19.03% | 7,830 | 80.97% | 0 | 0.00% |
| 1960 | 2,279 | 22.07% | 8,046 | 77.93% | 0 | 0.00% |
| 1964 | 3,932 | 33.42% | 7,834 | 66.58% | 0 | 0.00% |
| 1968 | 3,198 | 22.36% | 5,243 | 36.66% | 5,861 | 40.98% |
| 1972 | 8,244 | 62.53% | 4,635 | 35.16% | 305 | 2.31% |
| 1976 | 4,850 | 37.40% | 8,001 | 61.70% | 117 | 0.90% |
| 1980 | 5,916 | 42.09% | 7,945 | 56.52% | 195 | 1.39% |
| 1984 | 9,635 | 47.66% | 10,545 | 52.16% | 36 | 0.18% |
| 1988 | 6,831 | 42.92% | 9,044 | 56.82% | 41 | 0.26% |
| 1992 | 6,275 | 31.92% | 11,174 | 56.84% | 2,208 | 11.23% |
| 1996 | 6,010 | 34.78% | 10,568 | 61.16% | 700 | 4.05% |
| 2000 | 6,836 | 37.56% | 11,315 | 62.16% | 51 | 0.28% |
| 2004 | 8,163 | 38.73% | 12,877 | 61.09% | 39 | 0.19% |
| 2008 | 8,445 | 32.57% | 17,403 | 67.12% | 82 | 0.32% |
| 2012 | 8,546 | 31.68% | 18,310 | 67.89% | 116 | 0.43% |
| 2016 | 8,261 | 33.20% | 16,224 | 65.19% | 401 | 1.61% |
| 2020 | 9,206 | 36.13% | 16,089 | 63.15% | 182 | 0.71% |
| 2024 | 9,355 | 38.26% | 14,900 | 60.95% | 193 | 0.79% |

== Economy ==
Edgecombe County's unemployment has been declining from a peak of 17.1 percent in February 2010. In June 2024 the county had an unemployment rate of 6.1 percent.

== Education ==
Edgecombe County Public Schools has 14 schools ranging from pre-kindergarten to thirteenth grade. These are separated into four high schools, four middle schools, five elementary schools, and one K–8 school. It was formed in 1993 from the merger of the old Edgecombe County Schools and Tarboro City Schools systems.

The county is home to Edgecombe Community College with campuses in Tarboro and Rocky Mount.

== Communities ==
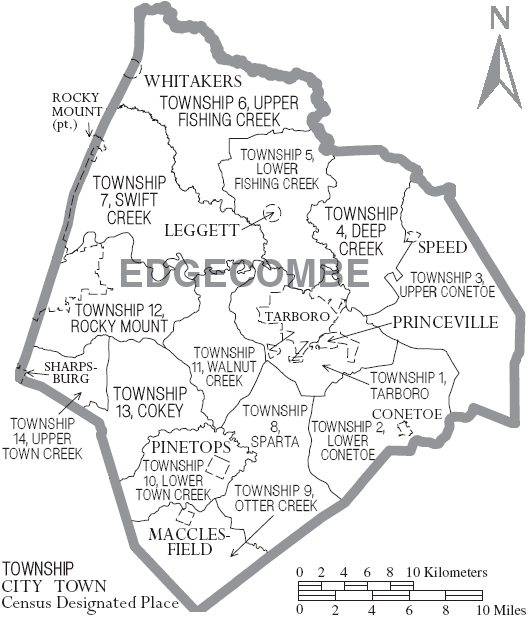
Map of Edgecombe County with municipal and township labels

=== City ===
- Rocky Mount (largest community; partially located also in Nash County)

=== Towns ===
- Conetoe
- Leggett
- Macclesfield
- Pinetops
- Princeville
- Sharpsburg
- Speed
- Tarboro (county seat)
- Whitakers

=== Townships ===
The county is divided into fourteen townships, which are both numbered and named:

- 1 (Tarboro)
- 2 (Lower Conetoe)
- 3 (Upper Conetoe)
- 4 (Deep Creek)
- 5 (Lower Fishing Creek)
- 6 (Upper Fishing Creek)
- 7 (Swift Creek)
- 8 (Sparta)
- 9 (Otter Creek)
- 10 (Lower Town Creek)
- 11 (Walnut Creek)
- 12 (Rocky Mount)
- 13 (Cokey)
- 14 (Upper Town Creek)

=== Unincorporated communities ===
- Crisp
- Mercer

== Notable people ==
- Duncan Lamont Clinch (1787–1849) – born at Ard-Lamont in Edgecombe County, American Army officer in the First and Second Seminole Wars
- Dorsey Pender (1834–1863) – born at Pender's Crossroads in Edgecombe County, Major General in the Confederate Army.
- Josiah Pender (1819–1864) – cousin to Dorsey Pender, who captured Fort Macon from Union soldiers in 1861.
- Hugh Shelton (born 1942) – four-star General and former Chairman of the Joint Chiefs of Staff, appointed by President Clinton.

== See also ==
- List of counties in North Carolina
- National Register of Historic Places listings in Edgecombe County, North Carolina
- Edgecombe County serial killer
- Halifax District Brigade#Edgecombe County Regiment

== Works cited ==
- Corbitt, David Leroy (2000). The formation of the North Carolina counties, 1663-1943 (reprint ed.). Raleigh: North Carolina Division of Archives and History. OCLC 46398241.
- Fleming, Monica S. (1996). Echoes of Edgecombe County: 1860-1940. Images of America. Charleston: Arcadia Publishing. ISBN 9781439619513.
- Turner, Joseph Kelly; Bridgers, John Luther (1920). History of Edgecombe County, North Carolina. Raleigh: Edwards & Broughton.
- Watson, Alan D. (1979). Edgecombe County : A Brief History. Raleigh: North Carolina Division of Archives and History.
