= North Carolina Highway 122 =

State highway in North Carolina, US

North Carolina Highway 122
- NC 122 highlighted in red

Route information
- Maintained by NCDOT
- Length: 29.4 mi (47.3 km)
- Existed: 1931–present

Major junctions
- South end: NC 124 in Macclesfield
- US 64 near Tarboro; US 64 / US 258 in Tarboro
- North end: NC 125 in Hobgood

Location
- Country: United States
- State: North Carolina
- Counties: Edgecombe, Halifax

Highway system
- North Carolina Highway System; Interstate; US; State; Scenic
← NC 121	→ NC 123

North Carolina Highway 122 (NC 122) is a primary state highway in the U.S. state of North Carolina. The road has a southern terminus at NC 124 in Macclesfield and runs through rural areas to reach its northern terminus at NC 125 in Hobgood. The highway serves several smaller communities such as Speed and Pinetops, along with Tarboro, and intersects two U.S. Highways. NC 122 is primarily a two lane undivided road, except when the highways widens to a four-lane undivided road along Howard Avenue and Western Boulevard in Tarboro. The highway also becomes a six-lane divided highway during its concurrency with US 64.

NC 122 first appeared in mid-1931 as a new routing running from NC 12 (present-day US 258) east of Tarboro to its current northern terminus at NC 125 in Hobgood. The route stayed the same until 1994 when it was extended to its current southern terminus in Macclesfield.

== Route description ==
NC 122 begins at the four-way intersection of NC 124 (Green Street) and Second Street in the main commercial district of Macclesfield. From there, the highway runs northeast along Second Street through a residential area of the town. Leaving Macclesfield, the road name changes to Pinetops-Macclesfield Road and continues toward Pinetops. Pinetops-Macclesfield Road runs through a mixed area of forests and farms and crosses Bynum Mill Creek. Entering Pinetops, the road name once again changes to Second Street, and the highway intersects NC 42 and NC 43 in the main commercial district of the town. Leaving the town, the highway turns northwest, partially paralleling NC 43 to the west. Approaching NC 111, the highway turns back to the northeast before intersecting the road. At the intersection, NC 111 begins to follow NC 122 along a concurrency north towards Tarboro. Both roads continue through rural areas of farms and forests before nearing Tarboro.

As the highway approaches Tarboro, it encounters a four-way intersection with Wilson Street, Sara Lee Road, and McNair Road. NC 111 continues straight along Wilson Street while NC 122 turns to the north to follow McNair Road. NC 122 remains semi-rural, with several houses and small businesses along the road, but the landscape is still dominated by farms and scattered forest. McNair Road crosses US 64 at a diamond interchange before continuing north. NC 122 intersects Howard Avenue just north of US 64, where it turns to the east. The road leaves the rural areas outside of Tarboro and enters a residential area just west of the main commercial district. The road bears slightly northeast at a split intersection with State Road 1208 (SR 1208), to continue following Howard Avenue. Briefly after this intersection, Howard Avenue widens from two lanes to four lanes with a center turn lane. Approaching Western Boulevard, the road runs through a commercial district of the city with several shopping centers alongside the road. The road intersects US 64 Alternate (US 64 Alt.) at Western Boulevard and turns south along a concurrency with the two lane road. NC 122 once again intersects NC 111 at Wilson Street along the southern side of Tarboro, beginning another concurrency with the road as NC 111 turns to Western Boulevard. Western Boulevard also widens from two lanes to four lanes at the intersection. Continuing to follow the road, NC 122 merges onto US 64/US 258 along with NC 111 to head east along the expressway.

Crossing over the Tar River, NC 122 exits off of US 64 along with US 258, and heads northeast along a two lane road toward Princeville. The highway meets up with NC 33 (South Main Street) in the center of town. After NC 111 breaks away in the eastern part of town, US 258 and NC 122 follow Mutual Boulevard, which roughly parallels the Tar River as it enters a rural area east of Princeville. As Mutual Boulevard approaches an intersection with Shiloh Farm Road (SR 1523), it enters a residential zone. Leaving the residential area, the boulevard intersects Howard Road before turning nearly due north. NC 122 turns northeast at Daniels Street and heads toward Speed. The two-lane highway continues through a mix of forests and farms, passing along the eastern side of Speed until reaching the outskirts of Hobgood, where it becomes the eastern terminus for NC 97 before becoming Pine Street and heading through the center of town. The highway runs through a residential district of Hobgood before reaching its northern terminus at NC 125 in the commercial district of the town.

== History ==
In the mid-1920s North Carolina state officials opted to move NC 12 from a route linking the towns of Speed and Hobgood to a more direct route linking Tarboro and Scotland Neck. The residents of Speed and Hobgood rejected the replacement of the route and brought a court case against the state, pointing towards the 1921 maps showing NC 12 running through the towns. The court ultimately decided that the state could move the road, and subsequently moved NC 12 along a new routing through Lawrence, as seen on the 1924 State Highway Map. NC 122 did not appear on North Carolina state maps until 1931, as a primarily graded route running from NC 12 (present-day US 258) east of Tarboro to NC 125 in Hobgood. The routing ran along that of NC 12 prior to the switch.

The route remained unchanged until 1994 when the routing of the highway was changed twice. On May 9, 1994, NC 122 was extended from its southern terminus, south along US 258 to NC 44 in Princeville. The highway then ran along a concurrency with NC 111 and NC 33 into Tarboro. The highway proceeded along Howard Street, along with NC 33, and followed its present-day routing through Pinetops to Macclesfield. Starting in Macclesfield, the highway ran along a concurrency with NC 124 east to US 258 in Crisp. In July 1994, NC 122 was removed from the routing along NC 124 to Crisp, creating the present southern terminus of the route. NC 124 was also removed from its routing along Howard Street between Main Street (NC 33) and Western Boulevard (US 64 Alternate) in Tarboro, instead placing the route along its current routing along Western Boulevard and US 64/US 258.

== Junction list ==
County	Location	mi	km	Destinations	Notes
Edgecombe	Macclesfield	0.0	0.0	NC 124 (Green Street)	
Edgecombe	Pinetops	3.3	5.3	NC 42 (Hamlet Street) / NC 43	
Edgecombe		5.5	8.9	NC 111	South end of NC 111 overlap
Edgecombe	Tarboro	10.3	16.6	NC 111 north (Wilson Street)	North end of NC 111 overlap
Edgecombe	Tarboro	11.0	17.7	US 64 – Raleigh, Tarboro	
Edgecombe	Tarboro	13.5	21.7	US 64 Alt. (Western Boulevard)	North end of US 64 Alt. overlap
Edgecombe	Tarboro	14.2	22.9	NC 111 (Wilson Avenue)	North end of NC 111 overlap
Edgecombe	Tarboro	14.8	23.8	US 64 / US 258	South end of US 64 Alt. overlap, West end of US 64 overlap, South end of US 258 overlap
Edgecombe	Princeville	15.7	25.3	US 64 east	East end of US 64 overlap. US 258, NC 122, and NC 111 all merge off of US 64 at exit 486
Edgecombe	Princeville	16.4	26.4	NC 33 (S Main Street)	
Edgecombe	Princeville	16.8	27.0	NC 111 (Greenwood Boulevard)	East end of NC 111 overlap
Edgecombe		20.2	32.5	US 258 – Scotland Neck	North end of US 258 overlap
Halifax	Hobgood	28.8	46.3	NC 97 west	Eastern terminus of NC 97
Halifax	Hobgood	29.4	47.3	NC 125 (Commerce Street)	
1.000 mi = 1.609 km; 1.000 km = 0.621 mi: Concurrency terminus
