= Rocky Mount station =

Railway station in Rocky Mount, North Carolina

Rocky Mount, NC
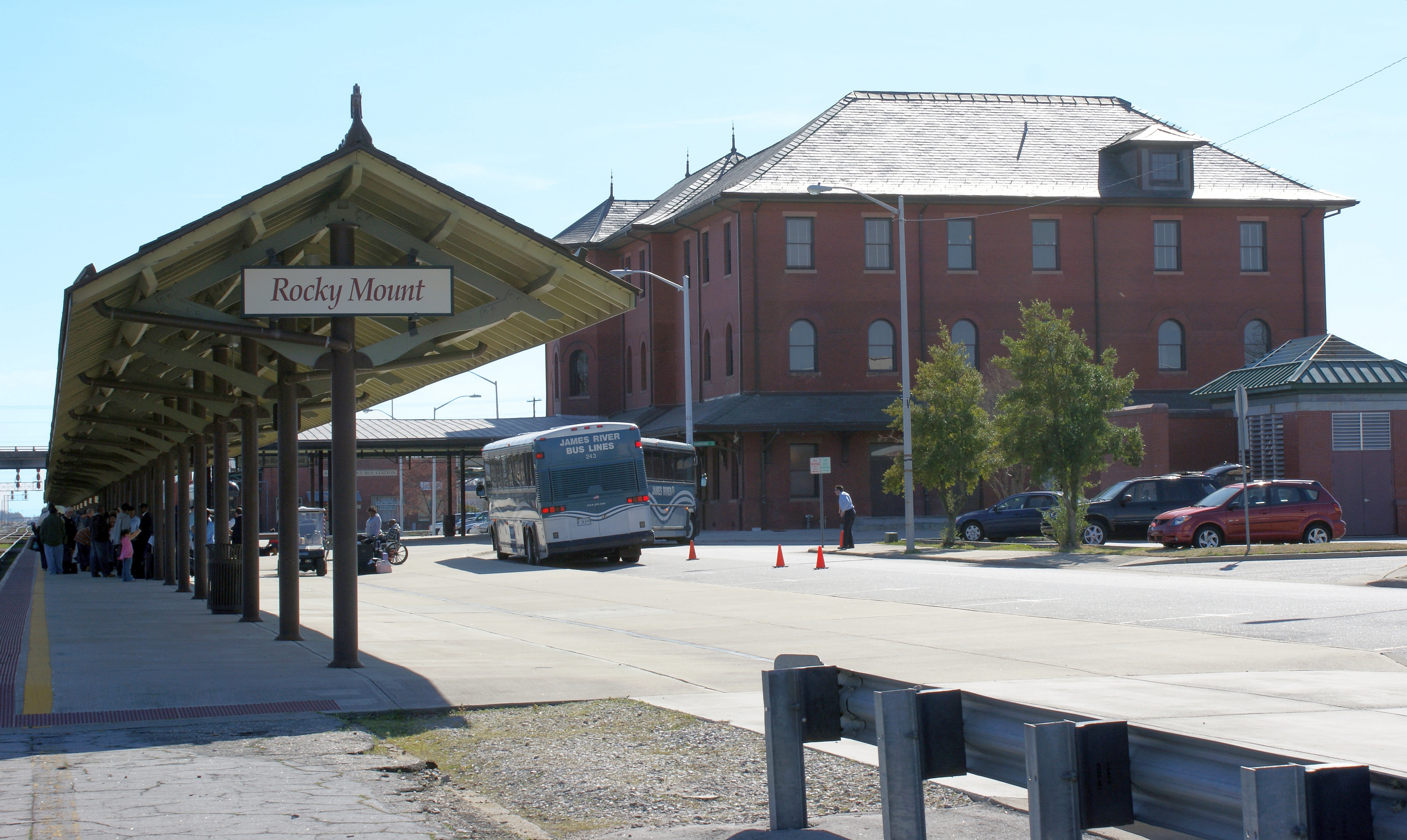
- Rocky Mount station in 2009

General information
- Other names: Helen P. Gay Rocky Mount Historic Train Station
- Location: 101 Hammond Street; Rocky Mount, North Carolina; United States
- Coordinates: 35.9380°N 77.7977°W
- Owner: City of Rocky Mount
- Line: CSX North End Subdivision
- Platforms: 1 side platform
- Tracks: 1
- Bus routes: 8
- Bus stands: 7
- Bus operators: Greyhound Lines; Tar River Transit

Construction
- Parking: 35 spaces
- Cycle facilities: Racks
- Accessible: Yes
- Architectural style: Romanesque Revival

Other information
- Station code: Amtrak: RMT

History
- Opened: 1893
- Rebuilt: 1911-12, 1916, 1997-2000
- Original company: Wilmington and Weldon Railroad

Passengers
- FY 2025: 54,383 (Amtrak)

Services
Preceding station	Amtrak	Following station
Wilson toward Charlotte	Carolinian	Petersburg toward New York
Wilson toward Savannah	Palmetto	Petersburg toward New York
Fayetteville toward Miami	Silver Meteor	Petersburg toward New York
Raleigh toward Miami	Floridian	Petersburg toward Chicago
Auto Train does not stop here
Former services
Preceding station	Amtrak	Following station
Raleigh toward Miami	Silver Star until 2024	Petersburg toward New York
Preceding station	Atlantic Coast Line Railroad	Following station
South Rocky Mount toward Tampa	Main Line	Battleboro toward Richmond
Nashville toward Lassiter	Nashville Branch	Terminus
Terminus	Kinston Branch	Tarboro toward Kinston
Terminus	Norfolk – Rocky Mount	Tarboro toward Norfolk

U.S. Historic district – Contributing property
- Official name: Atlantic Coastline Railroad Station
- Designated: June 19, 1980
- Part of: Rocky Mount Central City H.D.
- Reference no.: 80002826, 09000659
- Architectural style: None Specified
Location

Rocky Mount station, officially the Helen P. Gay Rocky Mount Historic Train Station, is an intermodal transit station in Rocky Mount, North Carolina, United States. It is served by four daily Amtrak round trips –the Carolinian, Floridian, Palmetto, and Silver Meteor – and is a bus station for Tar River Transit and Greyhound. The station is listed on the National Register of Historic Places as a contributing property to the Rocky Mount Central City Historic District.

== History ==
Rocky Mount station was originally built in 1893 by the Wilmington and Weldon Railroad, in dark red brick Romanesque Revival style. After the Atlantic Coast Line Railroad bought the W&WR, they rebuilt the station between 1911 and 1912, and again in 1916. During the 1960s ACL built a modern structure within the station to store switches and signal equipment before the railroad was merged with the Seaboard Air Line Railroad to form the Seaboard Coast Line Railroad.

In 1995, the 2.23-acre (0.90 ha) property, which included the station and a former REA Express freight house (c. 1930), was sold to the City of Rocky Mount. Between 1997 and 2000, the station was restored to its early 20th century design features, with additional accessible-compliant platforms and other amenities. The freight house was converted into a bus terminal for the Tar River Transit and Greyhound stop. In 2010, the station was named after Helen Parker Gay (1920-2016), a former member of the Rocky Mount City Council who was instrumental in the station's restoration project.

In 2026, Amtrak completed a $7.3 million accessibility project at the station that included an 840-foot (260 m)-long accessible platform.

Former ACL office car #303 is on display next to the station. Former ACL "Whopper Hopper" 500000 that had been on display at the station was donated to the North Carolina Transportation Museum in 2018.
