= Norfolk–Rocky Mount Line =

Railroad line in North Carolina and Virginia

Overview
- Status: Some segments are still operating
- Owner: Atlantic Coast Line Railroad
- Locale: Virginia; North Carolina

Technical
- Line length: 114.3 mi (183.9 km)
- Track gauge: 1,435 mm (4 ft 8 1/2 in) standard gauge
- Electrification: No
- Signalling: None

The Atlantic Coast Line Railroad's Norfolk–Rocky Mount Line (B Line) was one of the company's secondary main lines running from the company's main line in Rocky Mount, North Carolina northeast to a point just outside of Norfolk, Virginia. Despite its name, it terminated at Pinners Point in Portsmouth, Virginia (just across the Elizabeth River from Norfolk). Bus and ferry service connected passengers to Norfolk.

== Route description ==
The Norfolk–Rocky Mount Line Line began at a junction with the Atlantic Coast Line's main line in Rocky Mount, North Carolina. The junction was named on employee timetables as South Rocky Mount. From South Rocky Mount, it ran east to Tarboro, North Carolina, where it turned northeast. After Tarboro, it passed through Hobgood, Kelford, Aulander, Ahoskie, and Cofield. It crossed the Chowan River just beyond Cofield and crossed into Virginia just beyond Drum Hill. Once in Virginia, it headed straight for Suffolk. It turned east in Suffolk and came to an end at Pinners Point in Portsmouth, just outside of Norfolk.

The line's Plymouth Branch ran from the line in Tarboro and headed east to Williamston and Plymouth.

== History ==
The first segment of the Norfolk–Rocky Mount Line was built in 1849 from Rocky Mount east to Tarboro, which was built as the Tarboro Branch of the Wilmington and Weldon Railroad. In 1882, the Albemarle and Raleigh Railroad was built which extended the branch east to Williamston on the Roanoke River. The Albemarle and Raleigh Railroad was acquired by the Wilmington and Weldon Railroad in 1885 and was extended in 1890 to Plymouth.

Track from Tarboro to Pinners Point in Portsmouth was chartered in 1886 by the Chowan and Southern Railroad, though its name was changed to the Norfolk and Carolina Railroad by the time it opened in 1890. By 1900, the Wilmington and Weldon Railroad and the Norfolk and Carolina Railroad has been fully merged into the Atlantic Coast Line Railroad. The company then designated the line from Rocky Mount to Pinners Point as the Norfolk–Rocky Mount Line. Track from Tarboro to Plymouth became the Plymouth Branch.

The Atlantic Coast Line ran passenger and freight trains on the Norfolk–Rocky Mount Line. By 1949, they were running two round-trip passenger trains daily along with up to three round-trip freight trains a day. A local freight train ran the Plymouth Branch six days a week at the same time. By 1957, only freight trains were running from Rocky Mount to Pinners Point.

In 1967, the Atlantic Coast Line merged with its rival, the Seaboard Air Line Railroad (SAL), who also had a line to Portsmouth (the Portsmouth Subdivision). Upon completion, the merged company was named the Seaboard Coast Line Railroad (SCL). The company adopted the Seaboard Air Line's method of naming their lines as subdivisions and as a result, the Norfolk–Rocky Mount Line was designated as the East End Subdivision and the Plymouth Branch became the Plymouth Subdivision.

By the mid-1970s, the Seaboard Coast Line was primarily using the Portsmouth Subdivision to serve the Portsmouth area. Due to this and the fact that some bridges along the East End Subdivision were in need of repairs, the Seaboard Coast Line abandoned much of the line between Tarboro and Portsmouth in 1981. Track was then removed from Tarboro to Kelford and from Cofield to Portsmouth.

In 1980, the Seaboard Coast Line's parent company merged with the Chessie System, creating the CSX Corporation. The CSX Corporation initially operated the Chessie and Seaboard Systems separately until 1986, when they were merged into CSX Transportation.

== Current operations ==
Today, the Norfolk–Rocky Mount Line is still in service in two discontinuous segments.

=== Tarboro Subdivision ===
The line from Rocky Mount to Tarboro and the Plymouth Branch are still in service as CSX's Tarboro Subdivision. It connects with CSX's A Line just north of Rocky Mount Yard. It also connects with CSX's Parmele Subdivision in Parmele and the Carolina Coastal Railway in Plymouth.

=== Tarboro to Norfolk ===
The only other segment of the line that is still in service is from Kelford to Cofield. This segment is operated by the North Carolina and Virginia Railroad, which also operates former Seaboard Air Line track from Kelford to Boykins. CSX sold this segment of the line to the North Carolina and Virginia Railroad in 1987.

Segments of the former line between Suffolk and Portsmouth have been converted to rail trails, including the Suffolk Seaboard Coastline Trail and the Western Branch Chesapeake Trail.

== Historic stations ==
Rocky Mount to Norfolk
State	Milepost	City/Location	Station	Connections and notes
NC	AB 121.2	Rocky Mount	South Rocky Mount	junction with Main Line
NC	AB 128.6		Kingsboro	
NC	AB 131.6		Waldo	
NC	AB 135.6	Tarboro	Tarboro	junction with Plymouth Branch
NC	AB 143.0	Speed	Speed	
NC	AB 147.8	Hobgood	Hobgood	junction with Kinston Branch
NC	AB 152.3		Palmyra	
NC	AB 157.4		Norfleet	
NC	AB 162.3	Kelford	Kelford	junction with Seaboard Air Line Railroad Lewiston Subdivision
NC	AB 169.4	Aulander	Aulander	
NC	AB 174.5		Earley	
NC	AB 177.7	Ahoskie	Ahoskie	
NC	AB 180.8		Halls	
NC	AB 184.1	Cofield	Cofield	
NC	AB 184.9		South Tunis	
NC	AB 192.2		Eure	
NC	AB 193.8		Roduco	
NC	AB 197.0		Gates	
NC	AB 200.6		Drum Hill	
VA	AB 205.3	Whaleyville	Whaley	later known as Whaleyville
VA	AB 209.9		Nurney	
VA	AB 215.9	Suffolk	Suffolk	junction with: Seaboard Air Line Railroad Portsmouth Subdivision; Atlantic and Danville Railway (N&W)
VA	AB 220.2		Nansemond	
VA	AB 223.9		Drivers	
VA	AB 228.0		Boone	
VA	AB 230.8		Armistead	
VA	AB 231.6	Portsmouth	Portsmouth	
VA	AB 232.1	Portsmouth	Yard Tower	
VA	AB 233.1	Portsmouth	Pinners Point	ferry connections to Norfolk

Plymouth Branch
Milepost	City/Location	Station	Connections and notes
ABC 135.6	Tarboro	Tarboro	junction with Norfolk–Rocky Mount Line
ABC 136.7		EC Junction	junction with East Carolina Railway
ABC 140.7		Mildred	
ABC 143.7	Conetoe	Conetoe	
ABC 148.7	Bethel	Bethel	
ABC 152.2	Parmele	Parmele	junction with Kinston Branch
ABC 155.8	Robersonville	Robersonville	
ABC 160.5	Everetts	Everetts	
ABC 165.5		Poe	
ABC 166.3	Williamston	Williamston	
ABC 177.1	Jamesville	Jamesville	
ABC 183.4		Dardens	
ABC 188.6	Plymouth	Plymouth (Union Station)	depot now Port O' Plymouth Museum
