= North Carolina Highway 124 =

State highway in Edgecombe County, North Carolina, US

North Carolina Highway 124
- NC 124 highlighted in red

Route information
- Maintained by NCDOT
- Length: 9.2 mi (14.8 km)
- Existed: c. 1933–present
- Tourist routes: Tar Heel Trace

Major junctions
- West end: NC 42 near Bridgersville
- NC 111 at Pitt Crossroads; NC 122 in Macclesfield; US 258 in Crisp
- East end: NC 42 / NC 43 near Old Sparta

Location
- Country: United States
- State: North Carolina
- Counties: Edgecombe

Highway system
- North Carolina Highway System; Interstate; US; State; Scenic
← NC 123	→ NC 125

North Carolina Highway 124 (NC 124) is a 9.2-mile-long (14.8 km) primary state highway in the U.S. state of North Carolina. Entirely in Edgecombe County, it travels east from NC 42 near Bridgersville through Macclesfield to NC 42 and NC 43 near Old Sparta. NC 124 is a two-lane road which primarily runs through a rural area of Eastern North Carolina. It provides access from Macclesfield to Wilson and Greenville using NC 42 and U.S. Route 258 (US 258).

NC 124 first appeared on North Carolina state transportation maps in 1933, travelling from its current western terminus at NC 42 northeast of Bridgersville to US 258 and NC 12 in Crisp. By 1935, NC 12 was removed from its routing along US 258. The highway maintained the same routing until sometime between 1963 and 1964 when it was extended northeast from US 258 to its current eastern terminus at NC 42 and NC 43 southwest of Old Sparta.

== Route description ==
The western terminus of NC 124 is located at an intersection with NC 42 and Wilson County Road, northeast of a location known as Bridgersville. NC 124 runs east through a rural area with alternating farmland and forested areas. After 1.2 miles (1.9 km) the highway bears to the southeast toward Macclesfield. In the unincorporated community of Pitt Crossroads, NC 124 intersects NC 111. NC 124 then crosses Bynum Mill Creek and continues southeast. East of an intersection with Floral Street, NC 124 enters the town limits of Macclesfield and picks up the name Green Street. NC 124 primarily travels through a residential area of Macclesfield. It intersects the southern terminus of NC 122 at Second Street, an intersection adjacent to several businesses. From the intersection, the highway turns to the east and leaves the town limits of Macclesfield near Moore Street. It returns to a rural region and travels 2.2 miles (3.5 km) until reaching US 258 in the unincorporated community of Crisp. At the intersection, NC 124 turns to the northeast. It continues for three miles (4.8 km) through a rural area to its eastern terminus at NC 42 and NC 43 southwest of Old Sparta.

The North Carolina Department of Transportation (NCDOT) measures average daily traffic volumes along many of the roadways it maintains. In 2016, average daily traffic volumes along NC 124 varied from 780 vehicles per day near its eastern terminus to 2,500 vehicles per day west of US 258 near Crisp. No section of NC 124 is included within the National Highway System, a network of highways in the United States which serve strategic transportation facilities, nor does it connect to the system at any point.

== History ==
NC 124 was established between 1931 and 1933 by the North Carolina State Highway Commission. It first appeared on North Carolina state transportation maps in 1933. The original western terminus was located at its modern-day location, an intersection with NC 42 in western Edgecombe County. The highway travelled approximately six miles (9.7 km) along a gravel, sand-clay, and topsoil roadway, through Macclesfield, to its eastern terminus at US 258 and NC 12 in Crisp. NC 12 was removed from its concurrency with US 258 by 1935, eliminating the connection with NC 124. By 1940, NC 124 was paved in its entirety. Between 1963 and 1964, NC 124 was extended northeast from US 258 in Crisp to its current eastern terminus at NC 42 and NC 43. Since then, the road's designation has not been changed.

== Major intersections ==
The entire route is in Edgecombe County.

Location	mi	km	Destinations	Notes
	0.0	0.0	NC 42 – Wilson, Pinetops	Western terminus
Pitt Crossroads	1.7	2.7	NC 111 – Saratoga, Tarboro	
Macclesfield	3.6	5.8	NC 122 north (Second Street) – Pinetops, Tarboro	Southern terminus of NC 122
Crisp	6.1	9.8	US 258 – Farmville, Tarboro	
	9.2	14.8	NC 42 / NC 43 – Greenville, Wilson	Eastern terminus
1.000 mi = 1.609 km; 1.000 km = 0.621 mi: Concurrency terminus
