= Nashville Branch (North Carolina) =

Atlantic Coast Line Railroad branch in North Carolina

Overview
- Status: Some segments are still operating
- Owner: Wilmington and Weldon Railroad; Atlantic Coast Line Railroad
- Locale: North Carolina

Technical
- Line length: 40.5 mi (65.2 km)
- Track gauge: 1,435 mm (4 ft 8 1/2 in) standard gauge
- Electrification: No
- Signalling: None

The Atlantic Coast Line's Nashville Branch was one of the companies branch lines in North Carolina. At its greatest extent, it ran from Rocky Mount, North Carolina west thorough Nashville and Spring Hope to Lassiter (located just northeast of Raleigh). Part of the branch is still in service today.

== History ==
The Nashville Branch was built in 1887 as a branch of the Wilmington and Weldon Railroad from Rocky Mount to Spring Hope, North Carolina. By 1900, the entire Wilmington and Weldon Railroad network became part of the Atlantic Coast Line Railroad.

In 1926, the Atlantic Coast Line purchased tracks west of Spring Hope to Lassiter from the Montgomery Lumber Company and annexed them to the Nashville Branch. The Atlantic Coast Line considered extending it to Raleigh, but it was never built past Lassiter. By 1949, a local freight train was running the branch six days a week.

In 1967, the Atlantic Coast Line merged with its rival, the Seaboard Air Line Railroad (SAL), with the merged company was named the Seaboard Coast Line Railroad (SCL). The company adopted the Seaboard Air Line's method of naming their lines as subdivisions and as a result, the Nashville Branch was designated as the Nashville Subdivision (not to be confused with CSX's current Nashville Subdivision in Tennessee).

The branch was sold to the Nash County Railroad in 1985. In 2005, the Nash County Railroad planned to abandon the line between Momeyer and Spring Hope, North Carolina but the North Carolina Department of Transportation purchased the segment after reaching an agreement with the railroad to keep it in service.

The branch was sold again in 2011 to the Carolina Coastal Railway, who operates it today.

== Historic stations ==
Milepost	City/Location	Station	Connections and notes
ABA 119.9	Rocky Mount	Rocky Mount	junction with Main Line
ABA 125.9		Westry	
ABA 130.2	Nashville	Nashville	
ABA 136.1	Momeyer	Nomeyer	
ABA 138.6	Spring Hope	Spring Hope	
ABA 147.6	Bunn	Bunn	
ABA 157.4		Barham	
ABA 160.4		Lassiter	
