= Railroad Depot Complex =

Historic former train station in North Carolina, US

- U.S. National Register of Historic Places
- Location within North Carolina Location within the United States
- Location: Off N. Main St., Tarboro, North Carolina
- Coordinates: 35°54′23″N 77°32′32″W
- Area: less than one acre
- Built: 1884, 1908-1913
- MPS: Tarboro MRA
- NRHP reference No.: 80002830
- Added to NRHP: April 2, 1980

Railroad Depot Complex was a historic train station complex located at Tarboro, Edgecombe County, North Carolina. The brick section of the Freight House was built in 1884, with a frame addition built about 1912. The brick Passenger Station was built between 1908 and 1913, and consisted of a two-story central section flanked by one-story wings. It featured eclectic, classical detail, including flat arches with keystones, a bold and heavy cornice, and pilasters. The buildings have been demolished.

It was listed on the National Register of Historic Places in 1980.

Preceding station	Atlantic Coast Line Railroad	Following station
Rocky Mount Terminus	Norfolk – Rocky Mount	Speed toward Norfolk
Rocky Mount Terminus	Kinston Branch	Mildred toward Kinston
