= Nash County Railroad =

Railway line in North Carolina, United States

Overview
- Headquarters: Rocky Mount, NC
- Reporting mark: NCYR
- Locale: Eastern North Carolina
- Dates of operation: 1985–2011
- Predecessor: Seaboard System Railroad

Technical
- Track gauge: 4 ft 8 1/2 in (1,435 mm) (standard gauge)
- Length: 14.7 miles (23.7 km)

The Nash County Railroad (reporting mark NCYR) was the operator of the Rocky Mount & Western railroad, connecting with CSX Transportation at Rocky Mount and running 14.7 miles (23.7 km) to Nashville, North Carolina. This short line railroad was created in 1985 and was formerly a subsidiary of Gulf and Ohio Railways. The line is now operated by the Carolina Coastal Railway.

Commodities included poultry feed ingredients, steel, scrap metal, fertilizer, concrete, and railcar storage, which accounted for around 3,500 annual carloads.

The railroad rosterered three EMD GP38s, numbered 345, 2068, and 9657.

== History ==
Originally built as the Nashville Branch of the Wilmington & Weldon in 1887, the railroad was later absorbed by the Atlantic Coast Line in 1900. Ownership changed through a pair of mergers, first into the Seaboard Coast Line in 1967 and the Seaboard System in 1983. On November 4, 1985 shortline service began as the Nash County railroad by parent company Laurinburg & Southern.

In the 1990s Gulf & Ohio Railways gained control of a number of Laurinburg & Southern subsidiaries, including the Nash County railroad on February 28, 1994. Initially traffic consisted of grain, fertilizer, scrap metal, and forest products, amounting to 4,000 annual carloads.

On April 8, 2005 the railroad planned to abandon 4.7 miles (7.6 km) of tracks between Momeyer and Spring Hope, North Carolina. However, the North Carolina Department of Transportation sought to purchase the segment before it was abandoned, which it did on April 3, 2006 after reaching an agreement with the Nash County railroad.

== See also ==
- Gulf and Ohio Railways
- North Carolina and Virginia Railroad
