= Crisp, North Carolina =

Unincorporated community in North Carolina, US

Coordinates: 35°45′03″N 77°37′31″W

Crisp is an unincorporated community in Edgecombe County in eastern North Carolina, United States. It is located at the intersection of U.S. Route 258 and North Carolina Highway 124, approximately 11 miles south of Tarboro.

== History ==
Various family records indicate that farmers settled in the area by the late 18th century. The community became known as "Crisp" in 1896, when it acquired a post office. Before that time, the community had been referred to as "Eagles' Store," "Eagles' Crossroads," and other variations after the store run by the Eagles family, now through five generations. In 1896, the Eagles had taken on a business partner, Sellus M. Crisp, and when the business, on behalf of the community, applied for a post office with the request that the community be named "Eagles," it was on Eagles & Crisp Mercantile business stationery. The post office department, noting that several towns throughout the state had the word "Eagles" in the name, suggested that the town be called "Crisp." There was no disagreement and the Post Office had a station in Eagles' store until the early 1990s. Eagles Baptist Church was organized in 1891. At the time it was the second Missionary Baptist church in the county and is still the largest church in Crisp. Crisp Chapel Free Will Baptist Church, formerly Eagles Chapel, is the other church in the community. Historically, Eagles Baptist Church has served a white congregation and Crisp Chapel (formerly, Eagles Chapel) has served an African-American congregation.

There was a private academy, Eagles Academy, in Crisp from an unknown time in the 19th century into the 20th century. It was followed by a public school on the same site. The public school was graded and replaced several ungraded schools in the area, including Edgewood School. In around 1925 the high school grades (8-11) consolidated into South Edgecombe High School, about two miles away, being joined with Macclesfield and Pinetops high school grades. The elementary grades(1-8) did not consolidate until around 1960. During the 1950s, Crisp Elementary School was a seven-teacher, eight-grade school. The school site was east of and adjacent to Eagles Baptist Church and the Church now owns the property.
