= East Carolina Railway =

Former short-line railroad

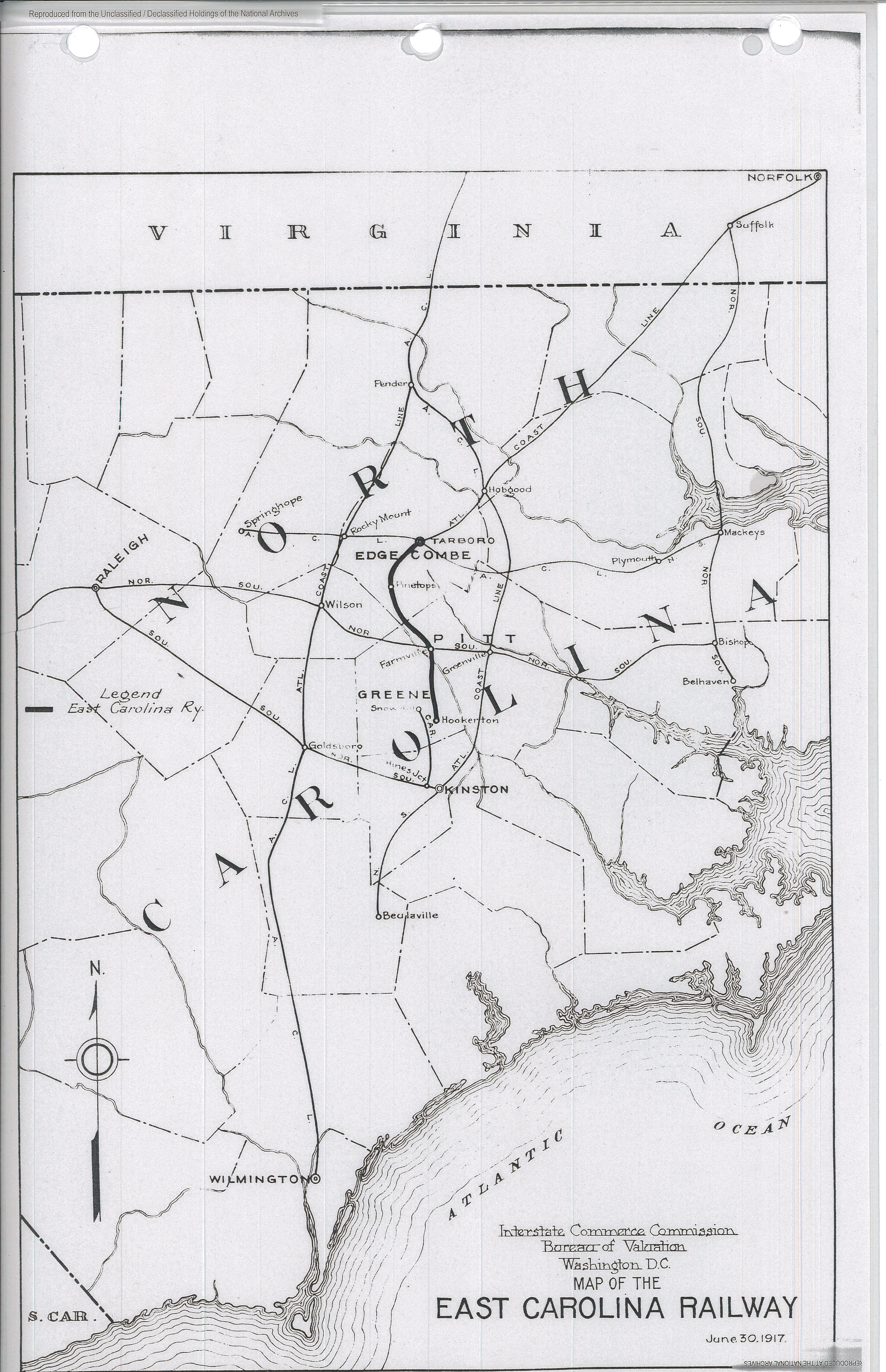
1917 map of the East Carolina Railway

The East Carolina Railway was a short-line railroad that ran from 1898 to 1965. Originating in Tarboro, North Carolina the East Carolina Railway interchanged at Farmville, North Carolina with the original Norfolk Southern Railway.

== History ==
The East Carolina Railway was incorporated in Tarboro in 1898, organized and initially presided over by Henry Clark Bridgers, Sr., nephew of Robert Rufus Bridgers who was president of the Wilmington and Weldon Railroad. Constructed using prison labor from Raleigh, the tracks reached Pinetops, North Carolina by July 1900, Macclesfield, North Carolina by September 1900, and in 1901 it extended all the way to Farmville. In 1908, the line was extended 12 miles to Hookerton, North Carolina. This segment was abandoned in 1933 during the Great Depression.

The railroad was acquired by the Atlantic Coast Line Railroad (ACL) in 1935, but continued to be locally managed by Henry Clark Bridgers until his death in 1951. The railway continued to be operated under the East Carolina Railway name until the Atlantic Coast Line Railroad abandoned the line in 1965. The last train ran on 16 November 1965.

In 1960, East Carolina reported 1.1 million net ton-miles of revenue freight and no passengers on its 29-mile railroad.

== Operations ==
The operating schedule as of 10 November 1903, according to the August 1904 edition of the "Official Guide of the Railways and Steam Navigation Lines of the United States, Porto Rico [sic], Canada, Mexico and Cuba" showed the departure of a train from Tarboro at 9:40 a.m. Eastern time, arriving at Farmville, 26 miles away, at 11:25 a.m. on Monday-Tuesday, and Thursday-Friday. On Wednesday and Saturday, the departure was at 3:35 p.m. with arrival at 5:50 p.m. Return trips departed at 6:45 a.m. Monday-Tuesday, Thursday-Friday, with arrival at 9:05 a.m., and at 12:30 p.m., arriving 2:30 p.m., on Wednesday and Saturday. No service ran on Sunday.

Around 1913, the East Carolina Railroad acquired seven single-truck streetcars, two closed motor (nos. 531 and 563) and five closed trailers (1514, 1521, 1526, 1552, and 1554) after they were retired by the Capital Traction Company in Washington, D.C. They were rebuilt in the Tarboro shops as gasoline-powered motor cars for passenger use, and saw about 17 years of service.

The last steam operation on the line was by ACL Baldwin Locomotive 4-6-0, No. 1031, in April 1957, now on display at the North Carolina Transportation Museum in Spencer, N.C.
