= Nurney =

Nurney may refer to:

- Nurney, County Carlow, Ireland
- Nurney, County Kildare, Ireland
  - Nurney GAA (County Kildare)
- Nurney, Virginia, United States, an unincorporated community
- David Nurney, bird artist
