= Rockbridge County, Virginia =

County in Virginia, United States

- County
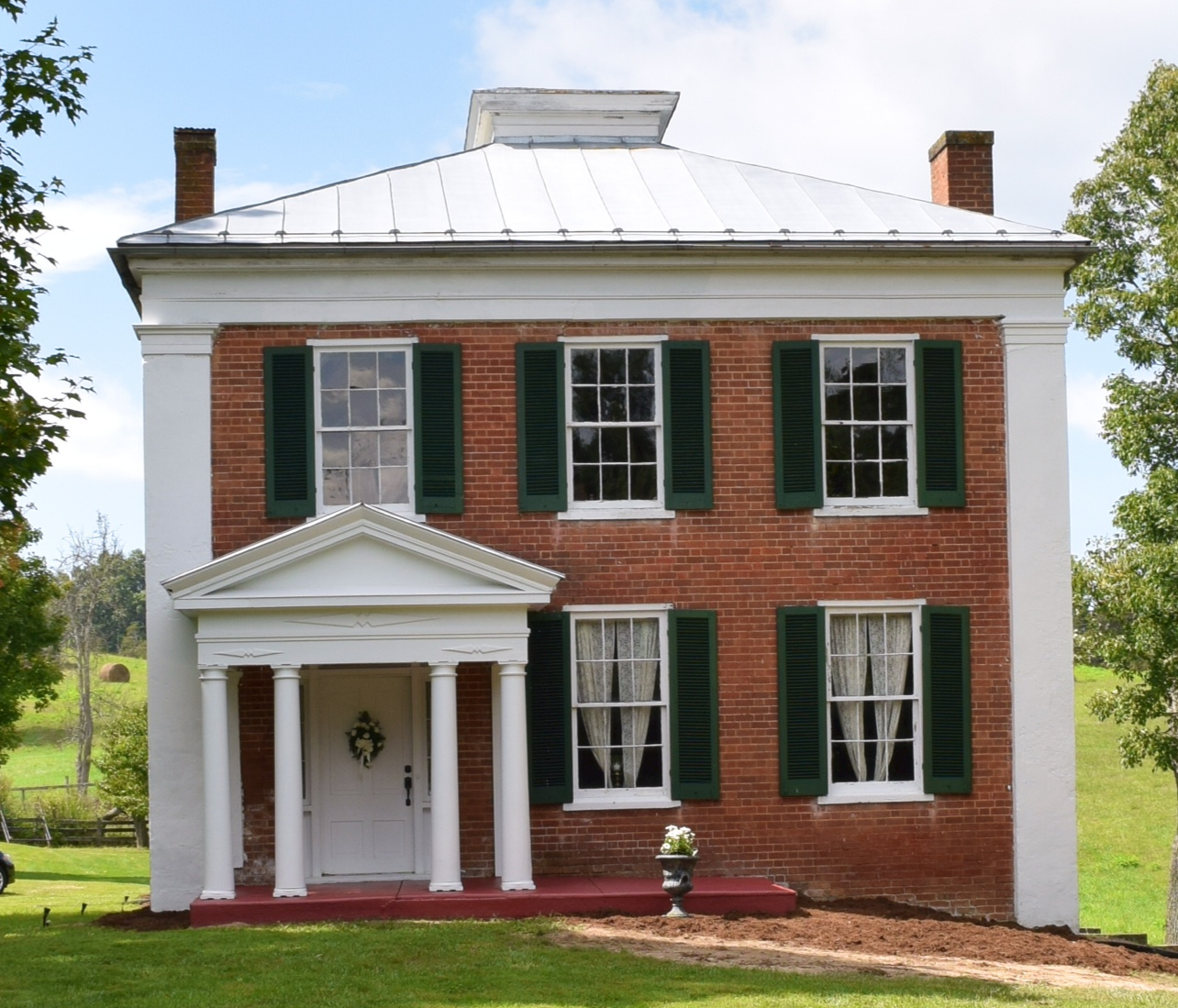
- Church Hill (Lexington, Virginia)

- Seal

- Location within the U.S. state of Virginia
- Coordinates: 37°49′N 79°27′W
- Country: United States
- State: Virginia
- Founded: October 1777 (established); 1778 (organized)
- Named for: Natural Bridge
- Seat: Lexington (independent city)^{1}
- Largest community: East Lexington

Area
  - Total: 601 sq mi (1,560 km^{2})
  - Land: 598 sq mi (1,550 km^{2})
  - Water: 3.4 sq mi (8.8 km^{2}) 0.6%

Population (2020)
  - Total: 22,650
  - Estimate (2025): 22,663 ▲
  - Density: 37.9/sq mi (14.6/km^{2})
- Time zone: UTC−5 (Eastern)
  - Summer (DST): UTC−4 (EDT)
- Congressional district: 6th
- Website: www.co.rockbridge.va.us

Rockbridge County is a county in the Shenandoah Valley on the western edge of the Commonwealth of Virginia. As of the 2020 census, the population was 22,650. Its county seat is the city of Lexington. Rockbridge County completely surrounds the independent cities of Buena Vista and Lexington. The Bureau of Economic Analysis combines the independent cities of Buena Vista and Lexington with Rockbridge County for statistical purposes.

== History ==
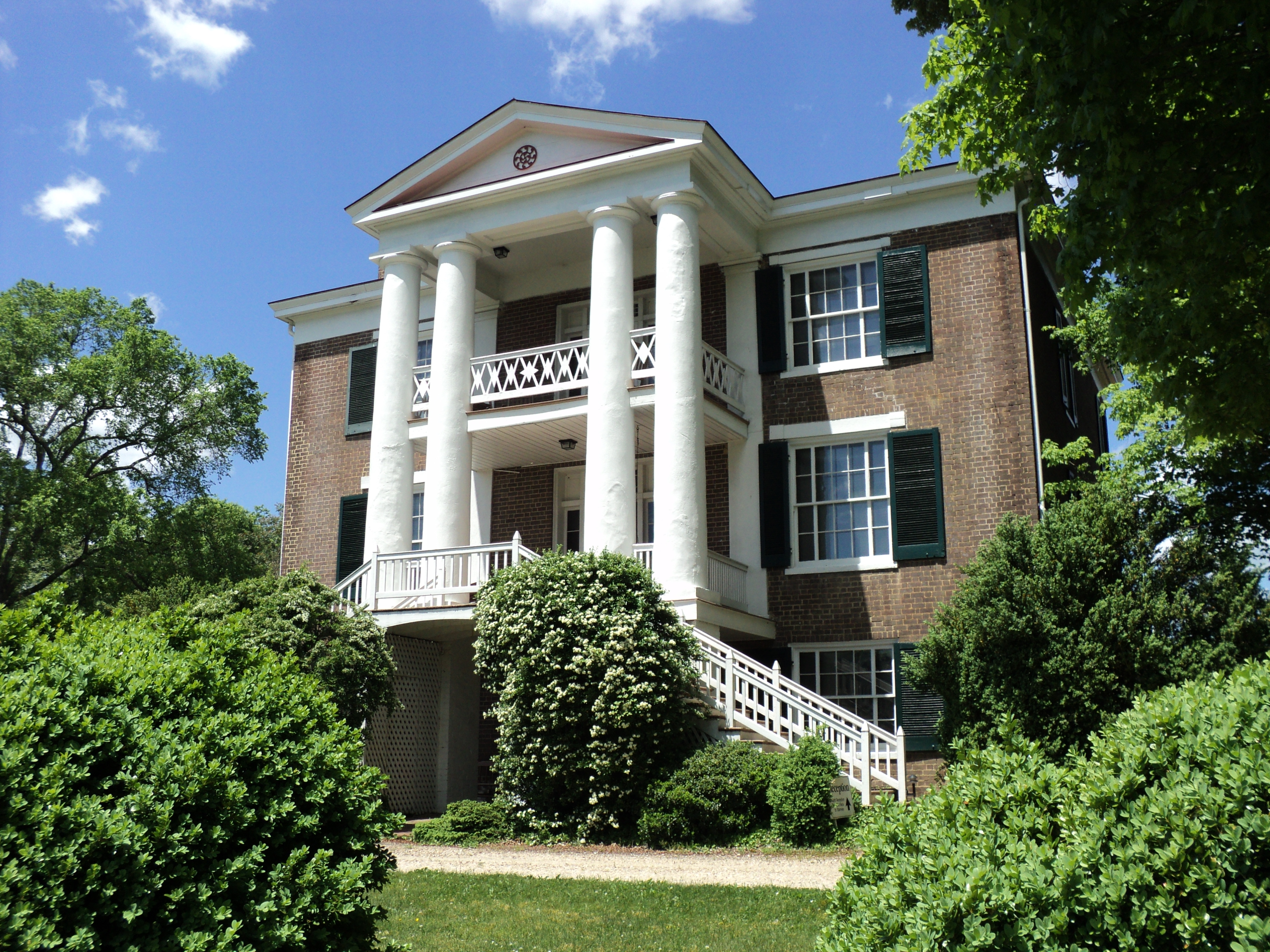
Maple Hall, antebellum house in Rockbridge County north of Lexington

The Monacan Indian Nation inhabited the area for thousands of years before American settlers arrived in the area. Multiple mounds were constructed near the modern towns of Rockbridge and Rockbridge Baths.

Rockbridge County was established in October 1777, from parts of now neighboring Augusta and Botetourt counties, and the first county elections were held in May 1778. Rockbridge County was named for Natural Bridge, a notable landmark in the southern portion of the county. Rockbridge County was formed during an act of assembly intended to reduce the distance that residents had to travel to the nearest courthouse, and to ensure trials were held fairly, and among neighbors rather than strangers. The first court session in Rockbridge County was held at the home of Samuel Wallace on April 7, 1778.

Because there were many subsistence farmers in the area, residents held fewer enslaved African Americans in Rockbridge County than in many parts of Virginia. The anti-slavery movement was stronger in Rockbridge than in the Tidewater or Piedmont regions. Several faculty members at Washington College (now Washington and Lee University) vigorously opposed slavery.

But, many of the wealthiest residents of Rockbridge County were planters and large landowners; they held numerous slaves and bequeathed them as property to their widows and children, or gave them as wedding gifts.

Cyrus McCormick grew up on his father's plantation in Raphine. His father held 41 enslaved African Americans and was a major property owner in real estate as well. McCormick invented the mechanical reaper near Steele's Tavern at the northern end of the county.

== Geography ==
The hilly terrain of Rockbridge County was densely wooded in the eighteenth century. Its more level areas have now been cleared and turned to agriculture. The county is bordered by high ridges along its NW and SE borders, with the crests running NE-SW. The terrain's highest point (4,072 feet/1,241 meters ASL) is Rocky Mountain on its SE border with Amherst County.

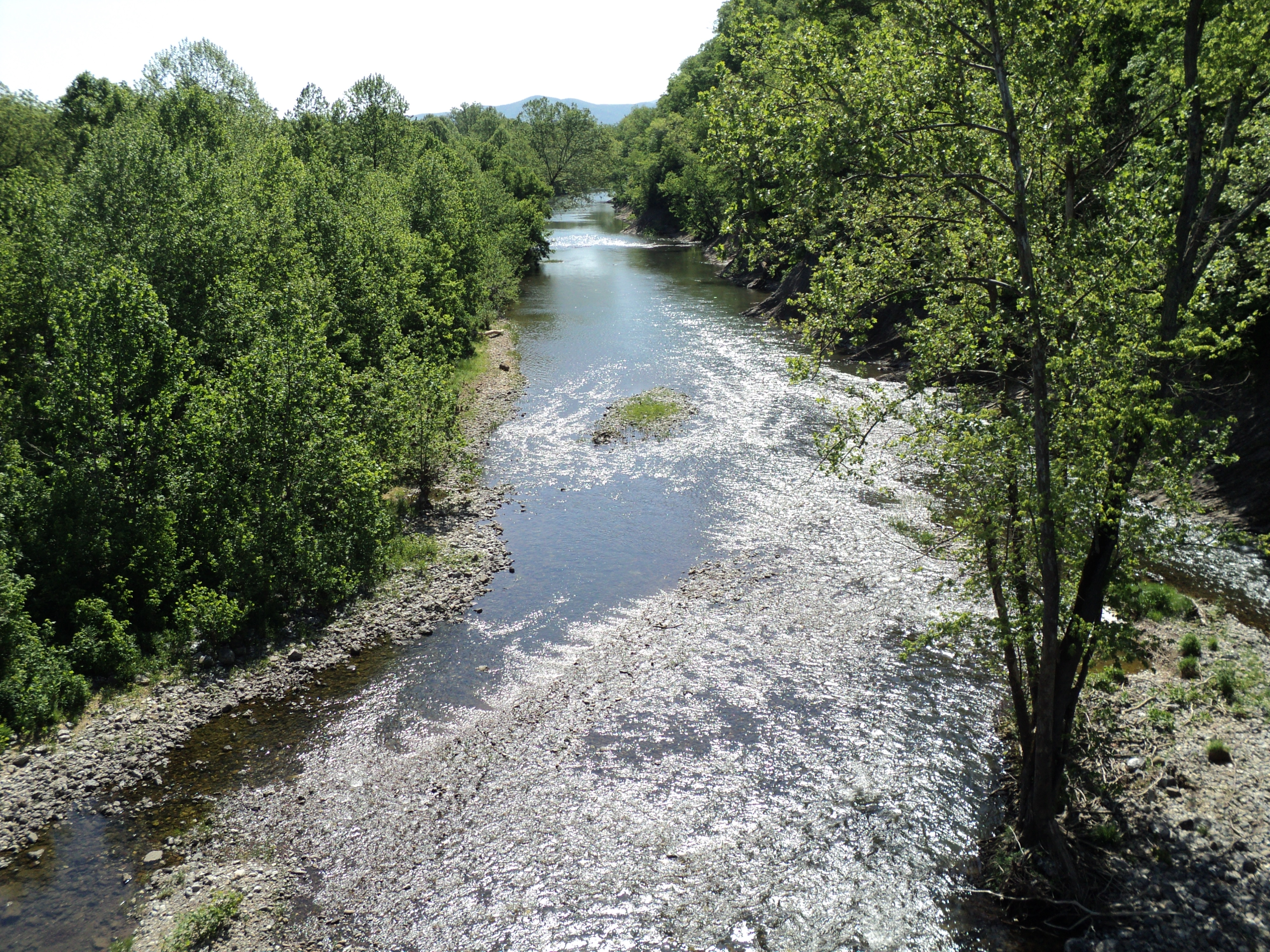
View of the Maury River, near Lexington

According to the US Census Bureau, the county has a total area of 601 square miles (1,560 km^{2}), of which 598 square miles (1,550 km^{2}) is land and 3.4 square miles (8.8 km^{2}) (0.6%) is water. Rockbridge County is one of the 423 counties served by the Appalachian Regional Commission, and it is identified as part of "Greater Appalachia" by Colin Woodard in his book American Nations: A History of the Eleven Rival Regional Cultures of North America.

=== Adjacent counties ===
- Bath County – northwest
- Augusta County – northeast
- Nelson County – east
- Amherst County – southeast
- Bedford County – south
- Botetourt County – southwest
- Alleghany County – west

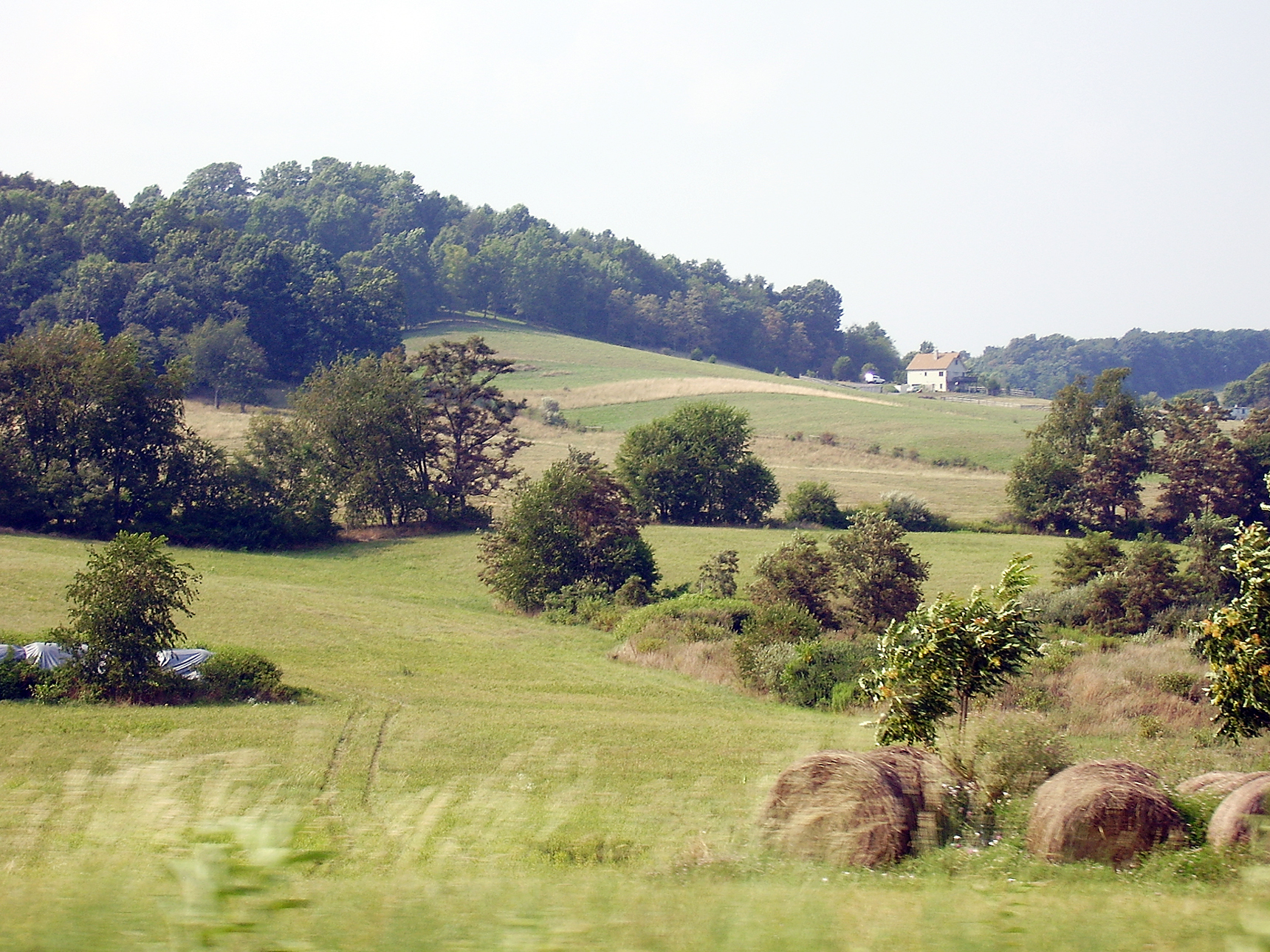
Raphine, Virginia

=== National protected areas ===
- Blue Ridge Parkway (part)
- George Washington National Forest (part)
- Jefferson National Forest (part)
- United States National Radio Quiet Zone (part)

=== Major highways ===
- I-64
- I-81
- US 11
- US 60
- US 501
- SR 39
- SR 56
- SR 130
- SR 251
- SR 252
- Blue Ridge Parkway

== Demographics ==
Historical population
Census	Pop.	Note	%±
1790	6,548		—
1800	8,945		36.6%
1810	10,318		15.3%
1820	11,945		15.8%
1830	14,244		19.2%
1840	14,284		0.3%
1850	16,045		12.3%
1860	17,248		7.5%
1870	16,058		−6.9%
1880	20,003		24.6%
1890	23,062		15.3%
1900	21,799		−5.5%
1910	21,171		−2.9%
1920	20,626		−2.6%
1930	20,902		1.3%
1940	22,384		7.1%
1950	23,359		4.4%
1960	24,039		2.9%
1970	16,637		−30.8%
1980	17,911		7.7%
1990	18,350		2.5%
2000	20,808		13.4%
2010	22,307		7.2%
2020	22,650		1.5%
2025 (est.)	22,663	▲	0.1%
U.S. Decennial Census; 1790–1960 1900–1990; 1990–2000 2010 2020

=== Racial and ethnic composition ===
Rockbridge County, Virginia – Racial and ethnic composition Note: the US Census treats Hispanic/Latino as an ethnic category. This table excludes Latinos from the racial categories and assigns them to a separate category. Hispanics/Latinos may be of any race.
Race / Ethnicity (NH = Non-Hispanic)	Pop 1980	Pop 1990	Pop 2000	Pop 2010	Pop 2020	% 1980	% 1990	% 2000	% 2010	% 2020
White alone (NH)	17,194	17,639	19,775	20,915	20,357	96.00%	96.13%	95.04%	93.76%	89.88%
Black or African American alone (NH)	574	569	610	585	565	3.20%	3.10%	2.93%	2.62%	2.49%
Native American or Alaska Native alone (NH)	10	33	53	99	85	0.06%	0.18%	0.25%	0.44%	0.38%
Asian alone (NH)	16	46	92	103	181	0.09%	0.25%	0.44%	0.46%	0.80%
Native Hawaiian or Pacific Islander alone (NH)	x	x	1	3	6	x	x	0.00%	0.01%	0.03%
Other race alone (NH)	9	7	8	15	82	0.05%	0.04%	0.04%	0.07%	0.36%
Mixed race or Multiracial (NH)	x	x	149	291	861	x	x	0.72%	1.30%	3.80%
Hispanic or Latino (any race)	108	56	120	296	513	0.60%	0.31%	0.58%	1.33%	2.26%
Total	17,911	18,350	20,808	22,307	22,650	100.00%	100.00%	100.00%	100.00%	100.00%

=== 2020 census ===
As of the 2020 census, the county had a population of 22,650. The median age was 48.5 years. 18.2% of residents were under the age of 18 and 25.3% of residents were 65 years of age or older. For every 100 females there were 96.4 males, and for every 100 females age 18 and over there were 95.5 males age 18 and over.

The racial makeup of the county was 90.4% White, 2.5% Black or African American, 0.4% American Indian and Alaska Native, 0.8% Asian, 0.0% Native Hawaiian and Pacific Islander, 1.2% from some other race, and 4.6% from two or more races. Hispanic or Latino residents of any race comprised 2.3% of the population.

9.9% of residents lived in urban areas, while 90.1% lived in rural areas.

There were 9,602 households in the county, of which 23.5% had children under the age of 18 living with them and 24.7% had a female householder with no spouse or partner present. About 28.8% of all households were made up of individuals and 15.1% had someone living alone who was 65 years of age or older.

There were 11,261 housing units, of which 14.7% were vacant. Among occupied housing units, 74.0% were owner-occupied and 26.0% were renter-occupied. The homeowner vacancy rate was 2.1% and the rental vacancy rate was 6.6%.

=== 2000 Census ===
As of the 2000 United States census, there were 20,808 people, 8,486 households, and 6,075 families in the county. The population density was 35 people per square mile (14 people/km^{2}). There were 9,550 housing units at an average density of 16 units per square mile (6.2 units/km^{2}). The racial makeup of the county was 95.42% White, 2.97% Black or African American, 0.26% Native American, 0.44% Asian, 0.12% from other races, and 0.78% from two or more races. 0.58% of the population were Hispanic or Latino of any race.

There were 8,486 households, out of which 29.20% had children under the age of 18 living with them, 57.50% were married couples living together, 9.50% had a female householder with no husband present, and 28.40% were non-families. 23.90% of all households were made up of individuals, and 9.90% had someone living alone who was 65 years of age or older. The average household size was 2.43 and the average family size was 2.84.

The county population contained 22.20% under the age of 18, 7.90% from 18 to 24, 27.20% from 25 to 44, 27.10% from 45 to 64, and 15.70% who were 65 years of age or older. The median age was 40 years. For every 100 females there were 100.40 males. For every 100 females age 18 and over, there were 98.00 males.

The median income for a household in the county was $36,035, and the median income for a family was $41,324. Males had a median income of $28,217 versus $19,946 for females. The per capita income for the county was $18,356. About 6.60% of families and 9.60% of the population were below the poverty line, including 9.40% of those under age 18 and 9.60% of those age 65 or over.

== Media ==
- The Rockbridge Advocate (monthly magazine)
- The News-Gazette (weekly newspaper)
- The Rockbridge Report (weekly broadcast and website, Washington & Lee University journalism students)
- EyeOnVirginia.com (videos and interviews with Rockbridge area newsmakers)
- Radio - 96.7 3WZ and 100.3 The Big Dawg

== Communities ==
The independent cities of Buena Vista and Lexington (incorporated 1892 and 1966 respectively) are enclaves within the boundaries of Rockbridge County, and are not a part of the county. Lexington is the county seat, despite its independent status, and shares three constitutional officers with Rockbridge County: Sheriff, Clerk of the Circuit Court and Commonwealth's Attorney. Buena Vista does not share constitutional officers with either Rockbridge County or Lexington.

=== Towns ===
- Glasgow
- Goshen

=== Census-designated places ===
- East Lexington
- Fairfield

=== Unincorporated communities ===
- Brownsburg
- Collierstown
- Gilmore Mills
- Marlbrook
- Mechanicsville
- Natural Bridge
- Natural Bridge Station
- Raphine
- Rockbridge Baths
- Steeles Tavern
- Vesuvius

== Notable people ==
- Robert H. Adams (1792–1832), born in Rockbridge County, United States Senator from Mississippi
- John Allen (1771–1813), born in Rockbridge County, a Kentucky political figure and colonel of militia, killed in the War of 1812
- Adam Rankin Alexander (1781–1848), born in Rockbridge County, United States Congressman from Tennessee
- Archibald Alexander (1772–1851), born in Rockbridge County, noted Presbyterian clergyman, president of Hampden–Sydney College, and one of the founders of and the first professor of Princeton Theological Seminary
- Samuel Dale (1772–1841), born in Rockbridge County, American frontiersman, known as the "Daniel Boone of Alabama" and a veteran of the Creek War of 1813–1814
- Pierre Daura (1896–1976), Spanish/Catalan painter, naturalized American who lived in the county
- Jessie Benton Frémont (1824–1902), born in Rockbridge County, American writer and political activist
- William C. Friday (1920–2012), born in Raphine, Rockbridge County, American educator, public servant and President of University of North Carolina
- Sam Houston (1793–1863), born in Rockbridge County, the only person to serve as governor of two U.S. states (Texas and Tennessee), victor at the Battle of San Jacinto, President of the Republic of Texas, and United States Senator
- Stonewall Jackson (1824–1863), one-time resident of Lexington, the county seat; General in the Confederate Army
- Robert E. Lee (1807–1870), former commander of the Confederate Army of Northern Virginia in the U.S. Civil War; after the war he accepted the presidency of Washington and Lee University (then Washington College)
- Robert Wood Lynn, American poet, winner of Yale Younger Poets Prize
- Sally Mann (born 1951), American photographer
- Charlie Manuel (born 1944), American and Japanese baseball player and World Series champion manager of the Philadelphia Phillies
- Rick Mast (born 1957), Fan-favorite Winston Cup and Busch Series driver
- Cyrus McCormick (1809–1884), inventor of the reaper
- Miles Poindexter (1868–1946), Graduate of Fancy Hill Academy and Washington & Lee University, United States Senator from Washington, 1920 Republican Primary Presidential Candidate, United States Ambassador to Peru, Author, retired to and died in his home in Arnolds Valley
- Samuel B. Pryor (1816–1866), First mayor of Dallas, TX. He was in the first class of the Virginia Military Institute.
- Archibald Roane (1759/60–1819), lived in Rockbridge County in the 1780s, Governor of Tennessee
- William Taylor (missionary) -- Nineteenth century missionary who spread and/or introduced Methodism around the world through his missionary work.
- A. Willis Robertson (1887–1971), U.S. Senator, father of Pat Robertson
- Pat Robertson (1930–2023), American minister, university president and media figure
- Cy Twombly (1928–2011), born in Lexington, American expatriate painter

== Politics ==
United States presidential election results for Rockbridge County, Virginia
Year	Republican		Democratic		Third party(ies)	
Year	No.	%	No.	%	No.	%
1912	433	26.81%	949	58.76%	233	14.43%
1916	601	36.18%	1,049	63.15%	11	0.66%
1920	1,054	43.34%	1,365	56.13%	13	0.53%
1924	680	31.89%	1,394	65.38%	58	2.72%
1928	1,206	47.91%	1,311	52.09%	0	0.00%
1932	811	30.97%	1,764	67.35%	44	1.68%
1936	868	34.50%	1,635	64.98%	13	0.52%
1940	902	35.58%	1,618	63.83%	15	0.59%
1944	961	36.85%	1,638	62.81%	9	0.35%
1948	1,062	46.50%	994	43.52%	228	9.98%
1952	2,068	65.90%	1,059	33.75%	11	0.35%
1956	2,273	66.50%	1,039	30.40%	106	3.10%
1960	2,170	60.53%	1,405	39.19%	10	0.28%
1964	2,200	45.78%	2,599	54.08%	7	0.15%
1968	2,280	56.80%	845	21.05%	889	22.15%
1972	3,009	74.28%	956	23.60%	86	2.12%
1976	2,157	43.66%	2,525	51.11%	258	5.22%
1980	2,784	49.04%	2,475	43.60%	418	7.36%
1984	4,067	65.66%	2,098	33.87%	29	0.47%
1988	3,541	58.41%	2,412	39.79%	109	1.80%
1992	3,228	43.02%	2,908	38.76%	1,367	18.22%
1996	3,274	44.98%	3,116	42.81%	889	12.21%
2000	4,522	57.77%	2,953	37.73%	352	4.50%
2004	5,412	58.95%	3,627	39.51%	142	1.55%
2008	5,732	56.22%	4,347	42.64%	116	1.14%
2012	5,898	57.95%	4,088	40.17%	191	1.88%
2016	6,680	61.88%	3,508	32.50%	607	5.62%
2020	8,088	65.37%	4,086	33.02%	199	1.61%
2024	8,468	66.01%	4,160	32.43%	200	1.56%

== See also ==
- National Register of Historic Places listings in Rockbridge County, Virginia
- FOR Swimming
