= Vinedale =

Historic house in North Carolina, United States

- U.S. National Register of Historic Places
- Location within North Carolina Location within the United States
- Location: SW of NC 42/43 and SR 1122, near Pinetops, North Carolina
- Coordinates: 35°46′50″N 77°36′21″W
- Area: 9.6 acres (3.9 ha)
- Built: c. 1855
- Architectural style: Greek Revival, Italianate
- NRHP reference No.: 82003450
- Added to NRHP: July 15, 1982

Vinedale is a historic plantation house located near Pinetops, Edgecombe County, North Carolina. It was built about 1855, and is a two-story, double-pile, three bays wide, Greek Revival / Italianate style frame dwelling. It features a one-story wraparound porch; a hipped roof with wide, overhanging, flat eaves and a cupola; and curved window heads and brackets.

It was listed on the National Register of Historic Places in 1982.
