= Mechanicsville, Rockbridge County, Virginia =

Mechanicsville, Virginia
- Unincorporated community
- Location within Virginia Location within the United States
- Coordinates: 37°42′47″N 79°24′21″W
- Country: United States
- State: Virginia
- County: Rockbridge
- Elevation: 948 ft (289 m)
- Time zone: UTC-5 (Eastern (EST))
  - Summer (DST): UTC-4 (EDT)
- Area code: 540
- GNIS feature ID: 1495060

Mechanicsville is an unincorporated community in Rockbridge County, Virginia, United States. Mechanicsville is 3 miles (4.8 km) southwest of Buena Vista.
