= Watson Brown (photographer) =

American photographer

- Born: October 10, 1950 (age 75); Edgecombe County, North Carolina, U.S.
- Education: East Carolina University; University of North Carolina at Chapel Hill
- Occupations: City planner Photographer
- Awards: Order of the Long Leaf Pine

Watson Brown (born October 10, 1950) is an American photographer and retired city planner.

== Early life and education ==
Brown was born on October 10, 1950, in Edgecombe County, North Carolina, to William Ashby Brown and Sallie Elizabeth Bardin Brown. He grew up on Adelphia Plantation, his family's farm located southwest of Tarboro. He lived across the street from his family's original 1854 plantation house, the Garrett-Wiggins-Brown House.

He graduated with a bachelor's degree from East Carolina University and a master's degree in city and regional planning from the University of North Carolina at Chapel Hill.

== Career ==
Brown worked as a city planner in Tarboro and in Raleigh for thirty years. After retiring in 2004, he began a career as a photographer, focusing on documenting architecture, culture, and life in Eastern North Carolina. He is self taught, never having formally studied photography.

Brown's work is exhibited at Gallery C in Raleigh. He has also shown work at the North Carolina State Capitol and was featured in Garden & Gun.

In 2014, he was awarded the Order of the Long Leaf Pine by Governor Pat McCrory in recognition for his work as a photographer.

== Personal life ==
Brown lives at Adelphia Plantation, which he inherited from his aunt in 1992.
