= Rocky Mount Central City Historic District =

Historic district in North Carolina, United States

- U.S. National Register of Historic Places
- U.S. Historic district
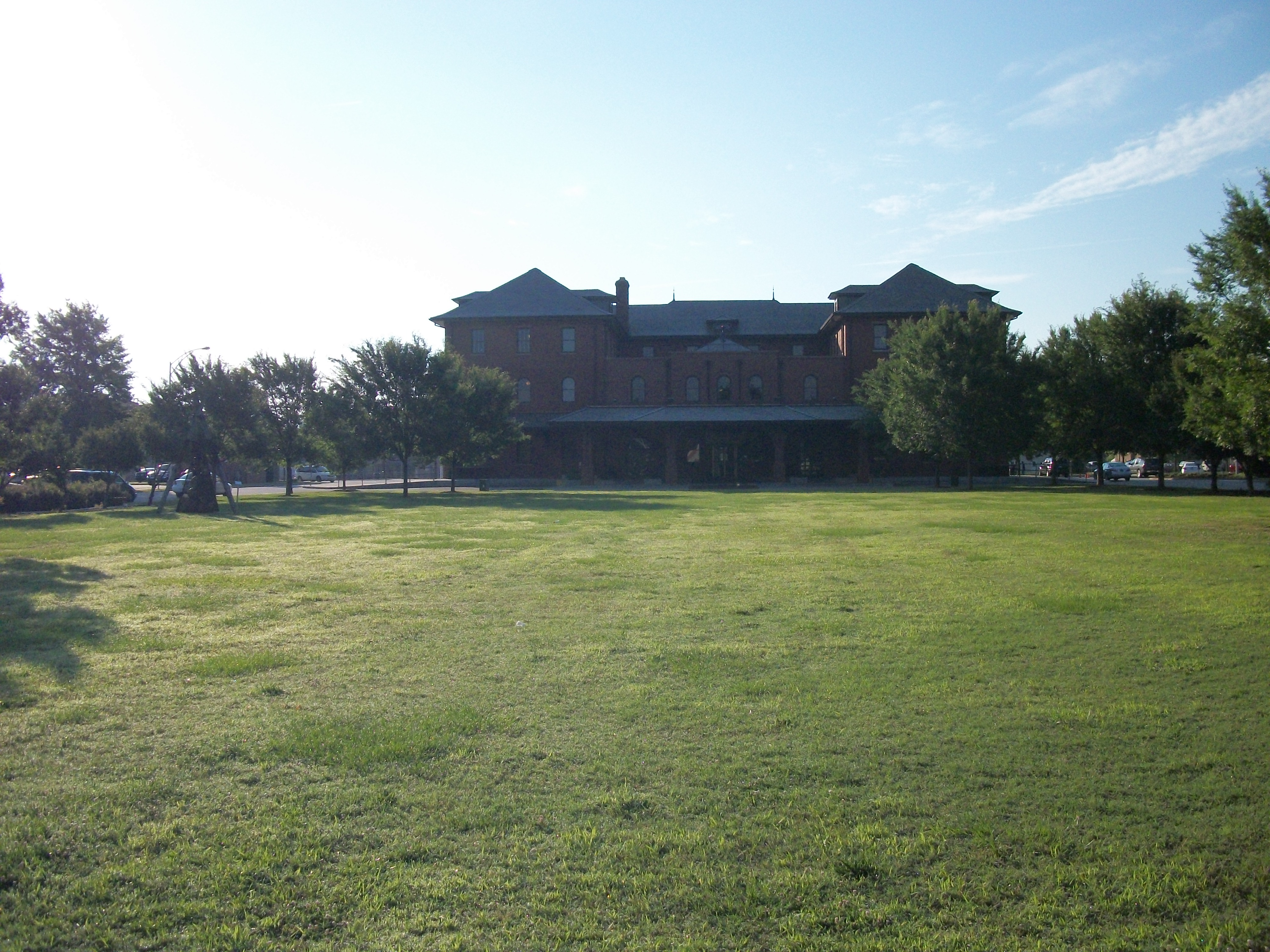
- Rocky Mount Amtrak-ACL Station

- Location within North Carolina Location within the United States
- Location: Roughly bounded by Robinson and Atlantic Aves., Holly and Franklin Sts.; also portions of 26 blocks on Main, Washington, Church, Battle, Hammond, Hill, Howard, Ivy, Gay, Goldleaf, and Thomas Sts., Rocky Mount, North Carolina
- Coordinates: 35°56′50″N 77°47′26″W
- Area: 108 acres (44 ha)
- Architect: Stout, John Christie; Et al.
- Architectural style: Late 19th And 20th Century Revivals, Classical Revival, Queen Anne, Modern Movement, Commercial
- NRHP reference No.: 80002826, 09000659 (Boundary Increase and Decrease)
- Added to NRHP: June 19, 1980, August 27, 2009 (Boundary Increase and Decrease)

Rocky Mount Central City Historic District is a national historic district located at Rocky Mount, Edgecombe County and Nash County, North Carolina. The district encompasses 166 contributing buildings in central Rocky Mount. It includes a variety of industrial, commercial, residential, and institutional buildings dating from the late-19th through mid-20th centuries. Notable buildings include the Firestation No. 2 (1924), Union Bus Station (1951), the Railway Express Agency Building (c. 1930), Memorial Hospital (1937), Church of the Good Shepherd (1877), Atlantic Coastline Railroad Station (1903-1916), Imperial Tobacco Company Processing Plant (1903-1923), S. H. Kress and Company (c. 1913), Belk-Tyler (c. 1905, 1915, 1920, 1945), Grand Theater (c. 1912, 1930s), Manhattan Theater (c. 1935), Holy Hope Episcopal Church (1910s), and Summerlin House (1895).

It was listed on the National Register of Historic Places in 1980, with a boundary increase / decrease in 2009.
