= Adelphia Plantation =

Historic plantation house in North Carolina, US

- Adelphia in 1897
- Interactive map of the Adelphia Plantation area
- Alternative names: Garrett-Wiggins House; Garrett-Wiggins-Brown House

General information
- Status: active
- Type: Plantation house
- Architectural style: Italianate
- Location: Tarboro, Edgecombe County, North Carolina, U.S.
- Coordinates: 35°50′15″N 77°37′18.5″W
- Completed: 1854
- Owner: Watson Brown

Design and construction
- Architect: George Lipscombe

Adelphia Plantation, also called the Garrett-Wiggins House or the Garrett-Wiggins-Brown House, is a historic plantation house in Edgecombe County, North Carolina, near the towns of Tarboro and Pinetops. The Italianate style house was built in 1854 for Joseph John Garrett.

== History ==
Adelphia Plantation was built in 1854 in Edgecombe County, North Carolina, for Dr. Joseph John Garrett, a local physician. The house, located north of the town of Pinetops and south of the town of Tarboro, was possibly designed by the architect George Lipscombe. It was built in the Italianate style and some of the designs used for ornamentation may have come from William Ranlett's 1847 pattern book The Architect. The house is also known as the Garrett-Wiggins House and the Garrett-Wiggins-Brown House.

The plantation also includes a doctor's office and a two-story wood-sided tobacco packhouse built in 1880 by Tom Battle, a carpenter and former slave on the plantation. Battle's family continued to work as sharecroppers at Adelphia. There are also gardens on the property.

Adelphia Plantation has been owned by the Wiggins-Brown family since 1881. John Lawrance Wiggins, a local magistrate, owned the house until his death in 1897, when it passed to his heirs. Wiggins was the father of Fred Wiggins, Nannie Elizabeth Wiggins, and Octavia Josephine Wiggins. In the 1990s, the house was inherited by photographer and city planner Watson Brown. Brown, who inherited the plantation from his aunt, renovated the house. Brown is the fifth generation of his family to live at Adelphia.

In August 2011, winds from Hurricane Irene caused an 125-year-old oak tree to fall on the grounds of Adelphia.
