= Marlbrook, Virginia =

Unincorporated community in Virginia, US

Coordinates: 37°51′43″N 79°15′11″W

Marlbrook is an unincorporated community in Rockbridge County, Virginia, United States. It sits at an elevation of 1204 feet (367 m).
