= Tar River Transit =

Public transport provider in North Carolina, USA

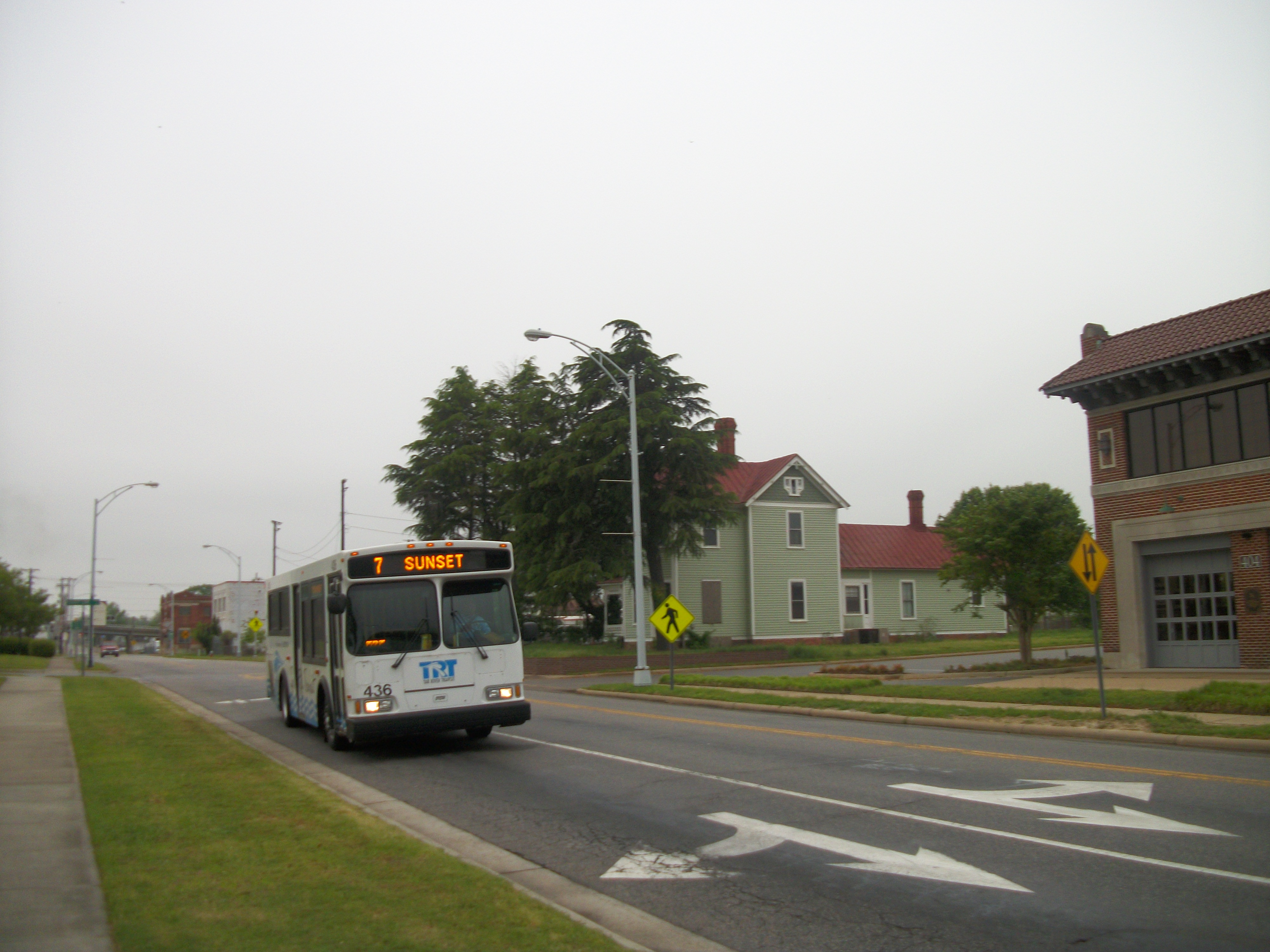
- The #7 Bus
- Headquarters: 331 South Franklin Street
- Locale: Rocky Mount, North Carolina
- Service area: Nash County, North Carolina; Edgecombe County, North Carolina
- Service type: bus service, paratransit
- Routes: 10
- Website: Tar River Transit

Tar River Transit is the primary provider of mass transportation in Rocky Mount, North Carolina. It provides service in Nash County and Edgecombe County. Service runs Monday through Saturday along ten routes.

== Routes ==
- Meadowbrook
- Oakwood
- South Rocky Mount
- Hillsdale
- Golden East
- Ravenwood
- Sunset
- Nash Community College / Little Easonburg Shuttle
- Battleboro / Goldrock Shuttle
- Rocky Mount East
