= Speed, North Carolina =

- Town
- Location in Edgecombe County and the state of North Carolina.
- Coordinates: 35°58′07″N 77°26′40″W
- Country: United States
- State: North Carolina
- County: Edgecombe
- Established: 1894
- Incorporated: 1901
- Named for: Dr. Eugene Travis Speed

Area
  - Total: 0.31 sq mi (0.79 km^{2})
  - Land: 0.31 sq mi (0.79 km^{2})
  - Water: 0 sq mi (0.00 km^{2})
- Elevation: 56 ft (17 m)

Population (2020)
  - Total: 63
  - Density: 207.4/sq mi (80.07/km^{2})
- Time zone: UTC-5 (Eastern (EST))
  - Summer (DST): UTC-4 (EDT)
- ZIP code: 27881
- Area code: 252
- FIPS code: 37-63720
- GNIS feature ID: 2407379

Speed is a town in Edgecombe County, North Carolina, United States. It is part of the Rocky Mount, North Carolina Metropolitan Statistical Area. As of the 2020 census, Speed had a population of 63.

== History ==
Speed was preceded by the community of Knight's Station; of which its existence had ended, by perhaps a generation, before the Norfolk and Carolina Railroad opened a line and added a stop in the area, in 1890. By 1894, it acquired a post office and its new name. Dr. Eugene Travis Speed (1855–1891), a local country doctor who had recently died, lent his name to the town. Speed was officially incorporated in 1901.

On October 14, 2025, the Town Board passed a resolution of intent to dissolve its charter. The town has until June 30, 2026, to develop a plan to distribute its assets and liabilities.

== Notable person ==
- Hugh Shelton – United States Army General and 14th chairman of the Joint Chiefs of Staff.

== Geography ==
According to the United States Census Bureau, the town has a total area of 0.3 square miles (0.78 km^{2}), all land.

== Demographics ==
Historical population
Census	Pop.	Note	%±
1930	95		—
1940	127		33.7%
1950	103		−18.9%
1960	142		37.9%
1970	142		0.0%
1980	95		−33.1%
1990	88		−7.4%
2000	70		−20.5%
2010	80		14.3%
2020	63		−21.2%
U.S. Decennial Census

As of the census of 2000, there were 70 people, 28 households, and 15 families residing in the town. The population density was 247.3 inhabitants per square mile (95.5/km^{2}). There were 60 housing units at an average density of 212.0 per square mile (81.9/km^{2}). The racial makeup of the town was 51.43% White, 45.71% African American, 2.86% from other races. Hispanic or Latino of any race were 2.86% of the population.

There were 28 households, out of which 21.4% had children under the age of 18 living with them, 53.6% were married couples living together, and 42.9% were non-families. 42.9% of all households were made up of individuals, and 25.0% had someone living alone who was 65 years of age or older. The average household size was 2.50 and the average family size was 3.50.

In the town, the population was spread out, with 20.0% under the age of 18, 2.9% from 18 to 24, 25.7% from 25 to 44, 30.0% from 45 to 64, and 21.4% who were 65 years of age or older. The median age was 47 years. For every 100 females, there were 100.0 males. For every 100 females age 18 and over, there were 107.4 males.

The median income for a household in the town was $25,938, and the median income for a family was $46,875. Males had a median income of $33,333 versus $36,250 for females. The per capita income for the town was $17,079. There were 22.2% of families and 26.9% of the population living below the poverty line, including no under eighteens and 46.2% of those over 64.
