= Kinston Branch =

Atlantic Coast Line Railroad branch in North Carolina

Overview
- Status: Some segments are still operating
- Owner: Wilmington and Weldon Railroad; Atlantic Coast Line Railroad
- Locale: North Carolina

Technical
- Line length: 85.9 mi (138.2 km)
- Track gauge: 1,435 mm (4 ft 8 1/2 in) standard gauge
- Electrification: No
- Signalling: None

The Atlantic Coast Line Railroad's Kinston Branch (A Branch) was a railroad line that at its greatest extent ran from company's main line in Pender, North Carolina south to Kinston, North Carolina. The line south of Parmele, North Carolina is still active today and is now the Parmele Subdivision of CSX Transportation, the Atlantic Coast Line's successor company through various mergers.

== Route description ==
The Kinston Branch began at a junction with the company's main line in Pender, North Carolina (just south of Halifax). From Pender, it ran southeast through Scotland Neck to Hobgood, where it crossed the company's Norfolk—Rocky Mount Line. Beyond Hobgood, it continued southeast to Oak City and then turned south to Parmele, where it crossed the Atlantic Coast Line Railroad's Plymouth Branch. Beyond Parmele, it continued south through Greenville to its terminus in Kinston.

The Kinston Branch also had a short branch to Washington, North Carolina. This branch, known as the Washington Branch split from the just south of Parmele and ran southeast to Washington.

== History ==
The first segment of the line from Pender to Scotland Neck was chartered as the Halifax & Scotland Neck Railroad in 1872. By 1878, construction had yet to begin and it was then rechartered as the Scotland Neck Railroad. Construction began in 1879 and the line began service from Pender to Scotland Neck on October 1, 1882. In 1883, the Scotland Neck Railroad was acquired by the Wilmington and Weldon Railroad an it became their Scotland Neck Branch. By 1890, the Wilmington and Weldon Railroad extended the Scotland Neck Branch south to Kinston. The Wilmington and Weldon Railroad built the Washington Branch in 1892.

By 1900, the entire Wilmington and Weldon Railroad network became part of the Atlantic Coast Line Railroad. The Atlantic Coast Line Railroad designated the line as their Kinston Branch.

By 1949, a local freight train was running the branch six days a week.

In 1967, the Atlantic Coast Line merged with its rival, the Seaboard Air Line Railroad (SAL), with the merged company was named the Seaboard Coast Line Railroad (SCL). The company adopted the Seaboard Air Line's method of naming their lines as subdivisions and as a result, the branch was designated as the Kinston Subdivision.

In 1980, the Seaboard Coast Line's parent company merged with the Chessie System, creating the CSX Corporation. The CSX Corporation initially operated the Chessie and Seaboard Systems separately until 1986, when they were merged into CSX Transportation. The northern segment of the line from Pender to Parmele was abandoned in 1984.

== Current conditions ==
Today, the remaining segment of the branch south of Parmele is now CSX's Parmele Subdivision. The Parmele Subdivision now terminates just north of Kinston at a grain elevator in Elmer.

== Historic stations ==
Pender to Kinston
Milepost	City/Location	Station	Connections and notes
AA 91.7		Pender	junction with Main Line
AA 99.5		Tillery	
AA 103.5		Spring Hill	
AA 109.9	Scotland Neck	Scotland Neck	
AA 116.7	Hobgood	Hobgood	junction with Atlantic Coast Line Railroad Norfolk—Rocky Mount Line
AA 123.7	Oak City	Oak City	originally Goose Nest
AA 128.2	Hassell	Hassell	
AA 134.8	Parmele	Parmele	junction with: Atlantic Coast Line Railroad Plymouth Branch; Washington Branch
AA 138.3		Whitehurst	
AA 144.0		Staton	
AA 146.3		House	
AA 149.7	Greenville	Greenville	junction with Norfolk Southern Railway (SOU)
AA 155.2	Winterville	Winterville	
AA 159.2		Ayden	
AA 166.0		Grifton	
AA 171.9		Graingers	
AA 177.6	Kinston	Kinston	junction with Atlantic and North Carolina Railroad (NS)

Washington Branch
Milepost	City/Location	Station	Connections and notes
AAB 134.8	Parmele	Parmele	junction with Kinston Branch
AAB 142.5		Stokes	
AAB 143.8		Whichard	
AAB 149.0		Pactolus	
AAB 154.7		Wharton	
AAB 159.2	Washington	W&V Junction	junction with Washington and Vandemere Railroad (ACL)
AAB 160.2	Washington	Washington	
