= Nurney, Virginia =

Unincorporated community in Suffolk, Virginia, United States

Coordinates: 36°38′33″N 76°36′50″W

Nurney is an unincorporated community in the independent city of Suffolk, Virginia, United States.
