= Momeyer, North Carolina =

- Town
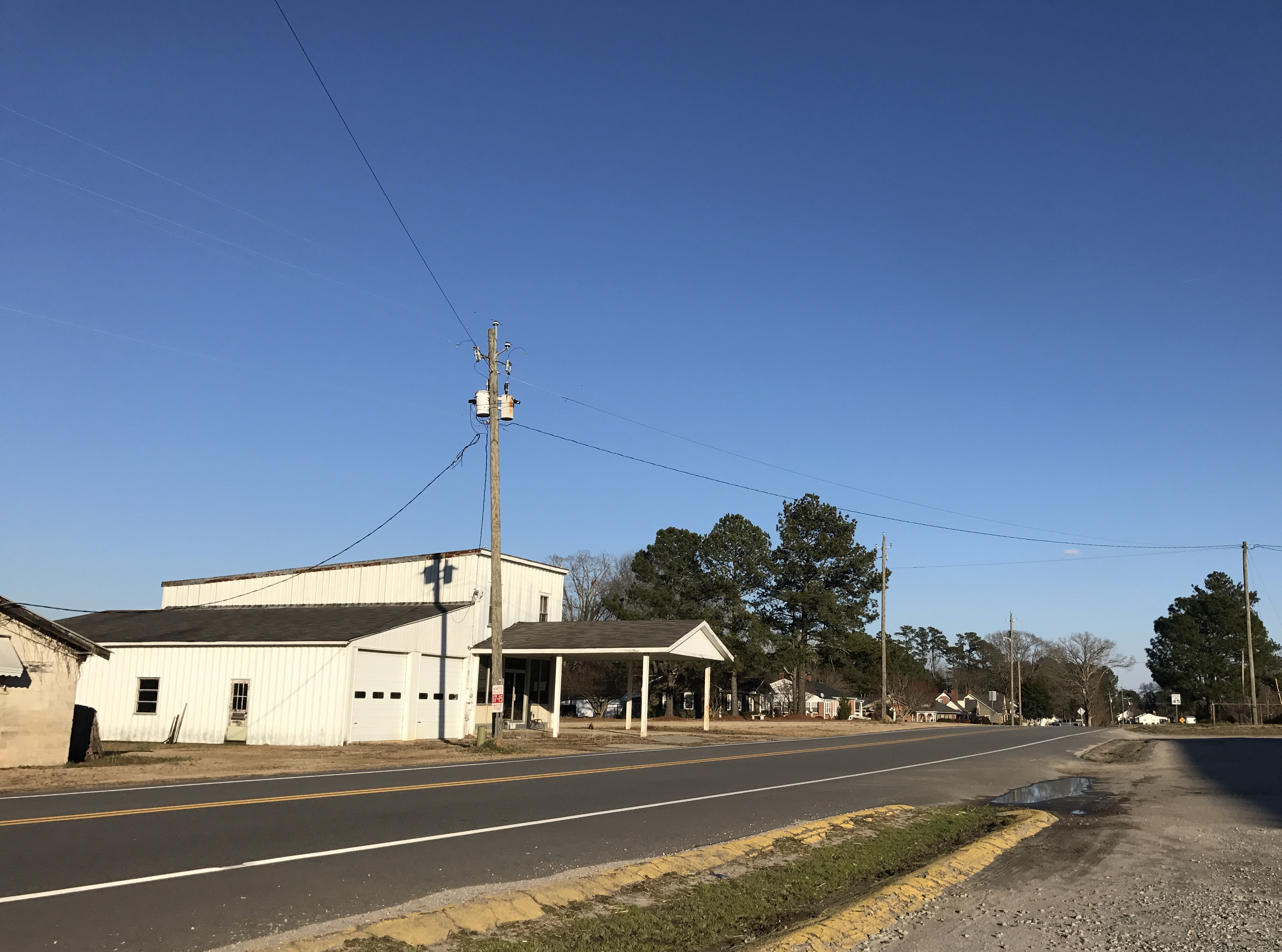

- Location in Nash County and the state of North Carolina.
- Coordinates: 35°57′33″N 78°03′04″W
- Country: United States
- State: North Carolina
- County: Nash

Area
  - Total: 1.11 sq mi (2.87 km^{2})
  - Land: 1.10 sq mi (2.86 km^{2})
  - Water: 0.0039 sq mi (0.01 km^{2})
- Elevation: 272 ft (83 m)

Population (2020)
  - Total: 277
  - Density: 250.8/sq mi (96.84/km^{2})
- Time zone: UTC-5 (Eastern (EST))
  - Summer (DST): UTC-4 (EDT)
- ZIP code: 27856
- Area code: 252
- FIPS code: 37-43860
- GNIS feature ID: 2406175

Momeyer (/ˈmoʊmaɪər/ MOH-mahy-uhr) is a town in Nash County, North Carolina, United States. It is part of the Rocky Mount, North Carolina Metropolitan Statistical Area. The population was 277 in 2020.

== Geography ==
According to the United States Census Bureau, the town has a total area of 1.1 square miles (2.8 km^{2}), of which 1.1 square miles (2.8 km^{2}) is land and 0.91% is water.

== Demographics ==
Historical population
Census	Pop.	Note	%±
2000	291		—
2010	224		−23.0%
2020	277		23.7%
U.S. Decennial Census

As of the census of 2000, there were 291 people, 118 households, and 84 families residing in the town. The population density was 265.7 inhabitants per square mile (102.6/km^{2}). There were 126 housing units at an average density of 115.0 per square mile (44.4/km^{2}). The racial makeup of the town was 92.78% White, 5.84% African American, 0.34% from other races, and 1.03% from two or more races. Hispanic or Latino of any race were 2.75% of the population.

There were 118 households, out of which 32.2% had children under the age of 18 living with them, 55.9% were married couples living together, 13.6% had a female householder with no husband present, and 28.0% were non-families. 23.7% of all households were made up of individuals, and 8.5% had someone living alone who was 65 years of age or older. The average household size was 2.47 and the average family size was 2.91.

In the town, the population was spread out, with 23.4% under the age of 18, 8.6% from 18 to 24, 28.5% from 25 to 44, 23.4% from 45 to 64, and 16.2% who were 65 years of age or older. The median age was 38 years. For every 100 females, there were 85.4 males. For every 100 females age 18 and over, there were 78.4 males.

The median income for a household in the town was $26,875, and the median income for a family was $36,875. Males had a median income of $27,000 versus $21,875 for females. The per capita income for the town was $15,429. About 4.1% of families and 9.7% of the population were below the poverty line, including 23.4% of those under the age of eighteen and 6.3% of those 65 or over.
