= Wilmington and Weldon Railroad =

American railroad line (1855-1900)

- Original route of the Wilmington and Weldon Railroad main line (red) and branches (dark red). Click to enlarge.

Overview
- Dates of operation: 1855–1900
- Predecessor: Wilmington and Raleigh Railroad
- Successor: Atlantic Coast Line Railroad

Technical
- Track gauge: 4 ft 8 in (1,422 mm)
- Length: 161.5 miles (259.9 km)

The Wilmington and Weldon Railroad (W&W) name began use in 1855, having been originally chartered as the Wilmington and Raleigh Railroad in 1834. When it opened in 1840, the line was the longest railroad in the world with 161.5 miles (259.9 km) of track. It was constructed in 4 ft 8 in (1,422 mm) gauge. At its terminus in Weldon, North Carolina, it connected with the Seaboard and Roanoke Railroad (to Portsmouth, Virginia) and the Petersburg Railroad (to Petersburg, Virginia). The railroad also gave rise to the city of Goldsboro, North Carolina, the midpoint of the W&W RR and the railroad intersection with the North Carolina Railroad.

After more than 50 years since passenger rail linked Wilmington and Raleigh, a push to bring back a passenger route between the two cities has arisen. The latest feasibility study, prepared by Florida-based firm WGI Inc., compares two potential route options linking Wilmington with Raleigh - a western route through Fayetteville and an eastern route through Goldsboro.

== History ==
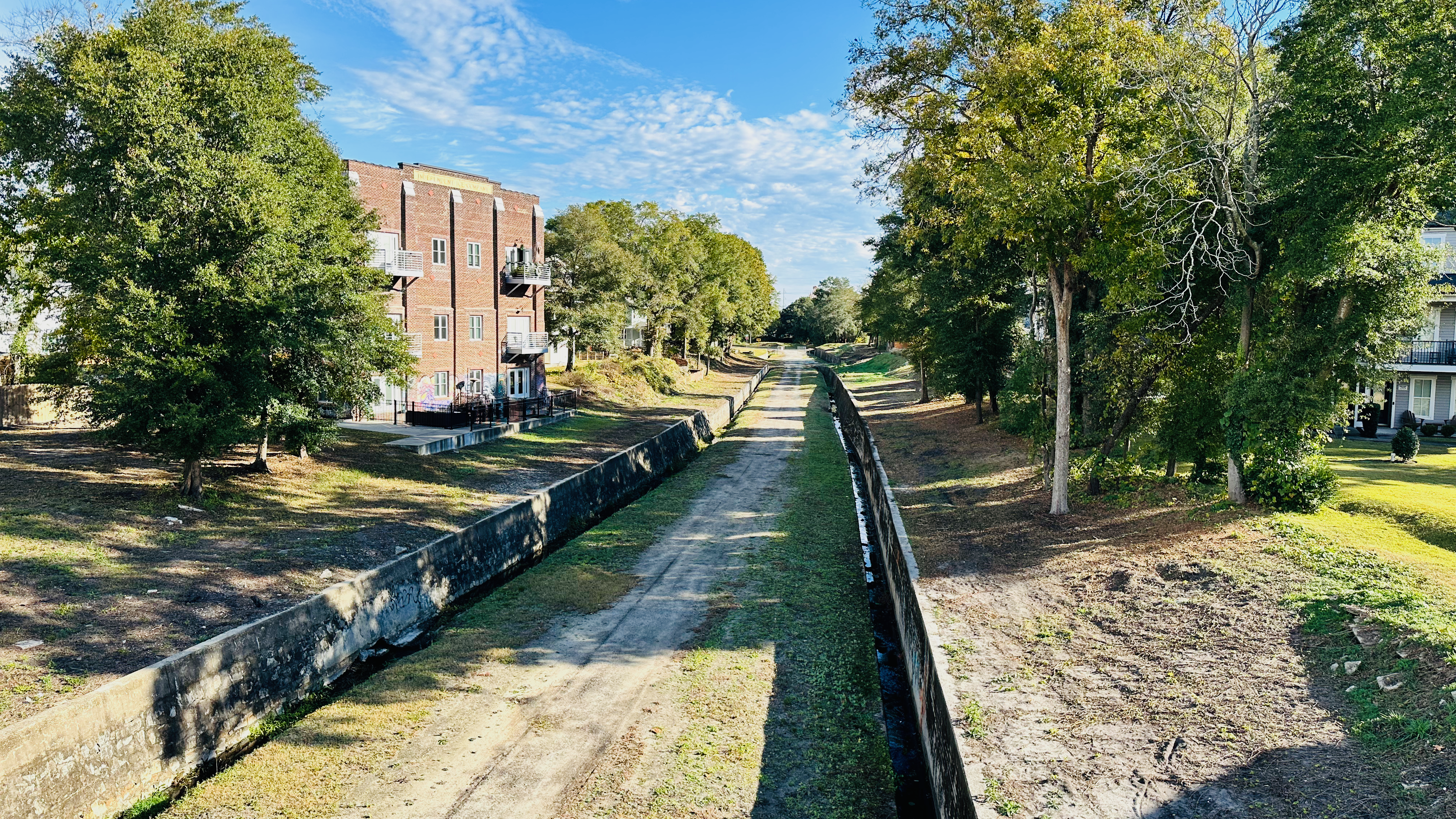
Wilmington and Weldon Railroad's original right of way through the Brooklyn neighborhood of Wilmington as seen from the Harry Forden Bridge. The railroad cut still remains.

Among the early employees of the W&W RR was Assistant Engineer William G. Lewis. The future Civil War general began his railroad career in 1858. From 1854 to 1871, S.L. Fremont was chief engineer and superintendent. Fremont, North Carolina, is named in his honor.

During the American Civil War, the railroad was used heavily by the Confederacy for transporting troops and supplies. The railroad also played a key role in the Siege of Petersburg. The cities of Wilmington and Goldsboro fell in 1865 at the end of the war, and the railroad was badly damaged.

The railroad managed to rebuild after the war. By 1866, the bridge over the Cape Fear River was rebuilt, which reconnected the line to Wilmington. By 1869, the W&W and other railroads in the Carolinas were purchased by a group of Baltimore capitalists, including William T. Walters. This group of lines was advertised as the Atlantic Coast Line, but still operated independently.

In 1872, the W&W was leased by the Wilmington, Columbia and Augusta Railroad, but this lease ended in 1878 when the WC&A went bankrupt.

The W&W was officially merged into the Atlantic Coast Line Railroad (ACL) on April 21, 1900, which established its headquarters in Wilmington. The Wilmington and Weldon Railroad's main line from Weldon to Contentnea (just south of Wilson, North Carolina) would become part of the ACL's main line. The remaining line south to Wilmington became the ACL's Contentnea–Wilmington Line.

In 1909, the ACL realigned the track in Goldsboro to bypass the center of town in conjunction with the opening of Goldsboro Union Station. The line's original alignment along Center Street was removed in 1925.

The Atlantic Coast Line moved their headquarters from Wilmington to Jacksonville, Florida in 1960. Shortly after, the company removed the original W&W track entering in central Wilmington, which ran through a cut in the Brooklyn neighborhood. The cut that the tracks through in Brooklyn still remains today.

The Atlantic Coast Line became the Seaboard Coast Line Railroad in 1967 after merging with their former rival, the Seaboard Air Line Railroad. In 1980, the Seaboard Coast Line's parent company merged with the Chessie System, creating the CSX Corporation. The CSX Corporation initially operated the Chessie and Seaboard Systems separately until 1986, when they were merged into CSX Transportation. The ex-ACL main line is still in service as CSX's A Line. In 1986, CSX abandoned remaining W&W track from Wilmington to Wallace. The former W&W from Contentnea south to Wallace is designated as CSX's W&W Subdivision (named in reference to the Wilmington and Weldon Railroad).

== Branches ==
In addition to the main line between its namesake cities, the Wilmington and Weldon Railroad also operated a number of branch lines.

=== Scotland Neck Branch ===
The Scotland Neck Branch was built in 1882 by the Scotland Neck Railroad. It connected with the main line at Pender (just south of Halifax) and ran southeast to Scotland Neck. In 1883, it was acquired by the W&W and by 1890, it had been extended south to Kinston. The branch was then known as the Kinston Branch after W&W was merged into the Atlantic Coast Line. Today, the branch is still in service from Parmele to just north of Kinston.

=== Nashville Branch ===
The Nashville Branch was built in 1887 and ran from the main line at Rocky Mount west to Nashville and Spring Hope. CSX sold the branch to the Nash County Railroad in 1985. It was sold again in 2011 to the Carolina Coastal Railway, who operates it today.

=== Tarboro Branch ===
The Tarboro Branch was built in 1850 and ran from the main line at Rocky Mount east to Tarboro. In 1882, the Albemarle and Raleigh Railroad was built which extended the branch east to Williamston on the Roanoke River. It was extended again in 1890 to Plymouth. The W&W acquired the Albemarle and Raleigh Railroad in 1885.

After the W&W was merged into the Atlantic Coast Line, the branch was part of the ACL's Norfolk—Rocky Mount Line west of Tarboro (which continued to Norfolk via the former Norfolk and Carolina Railroad). East of Tarboro, it was known as the Plymouth Branch. The branch is still in service today.

=== Midland Branch ===
The Midland Branch ran from the main line at Goldsboro west to Smithfield. It was originally chartered as the Smithfield and Goldsboro Railroad and it was built by its parent company, the Midland North Carolina Railway. It was acquired by the W&W in 1885. It was named the Midland Branch after the Midland North Carolina Railway. The branch closely paralleled the North Carolina Railroad (which was operated by the Southern Railway). Atlantic Coast Line abandoned the Midland Branch in 1930.

=== Clinton Branch ===
The Clinton Branch was built in 1887 and ran from the main line at Warsaw west to Clinton. The Clinton Branch (known today simply as the Clinton Spur) is still in service today and it is partially operated by the Clinton Railroad.
