= Hobgood, North Carolina =

- Town
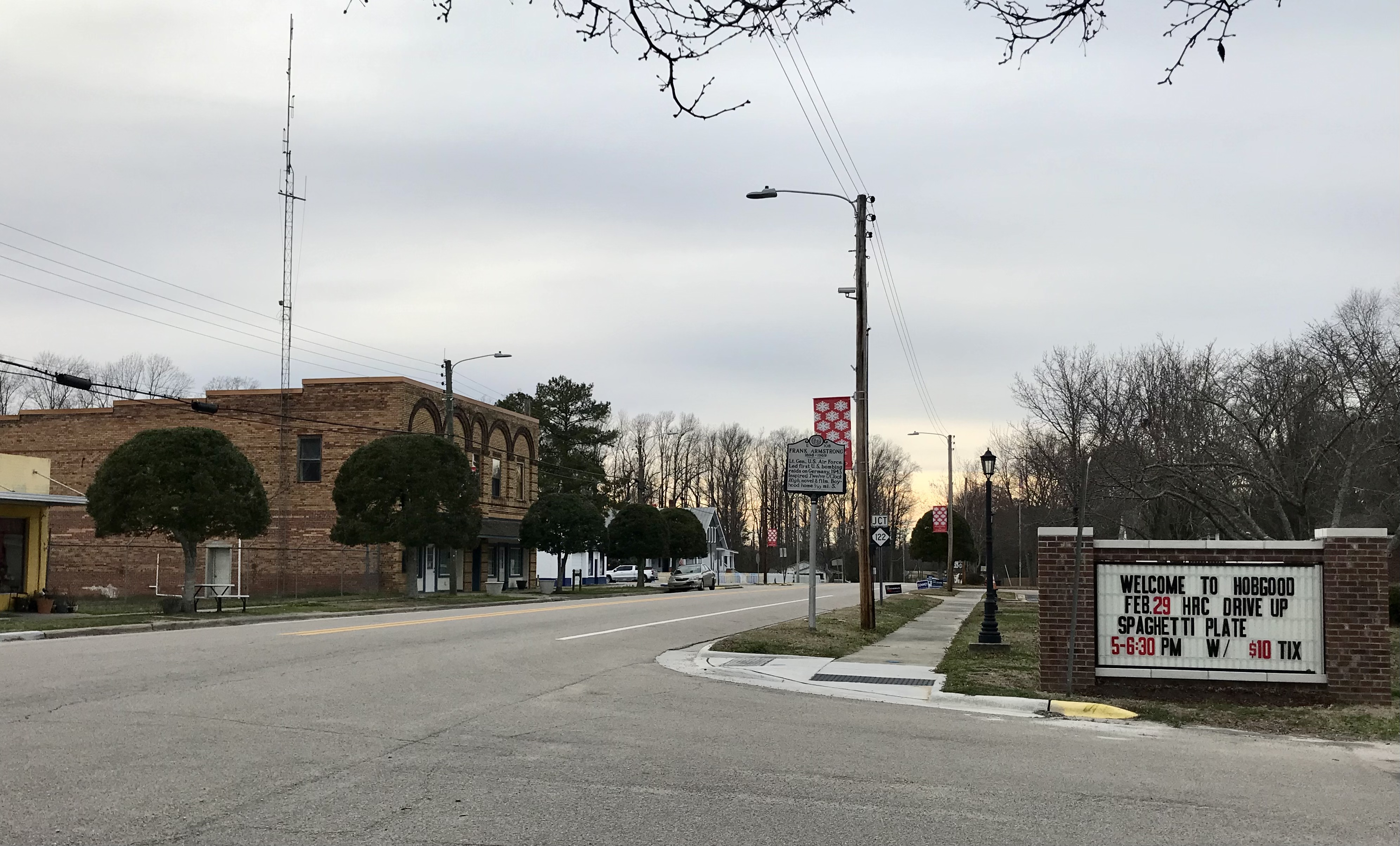
- West Commerce Street

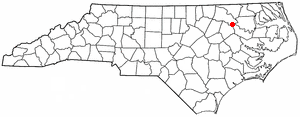
- Location of Hobgood, North Carolina
- Coordinates: 36°01′36″N 77°23′38″W
- Country: United States
- State: North Carolina
- County: Halifax

Area
  - Total: 1.03 sq mi (2.68 km^{2})
  - Land: 1.03 sq mi (2.68 km^{2})
  - Water: 0 sq mi (0.00 km^{2})
- Elevation: 89 ft (27 m)

Population (2020)
  - Total: 268
  - Density: 259/sq mi (100.1/km^{2})
- Time zone: UTC-5 (Eastern (EST))
  - Summer (DST): UTC-4 (EDT)
- ZIP code: 27843
- Area code: 252
- FIPS code: 37-31860
- GNIS feature ID: 2405844
- Website: https://www.thetownofhobgood.com/

Hobgood is a town in Halifax County, North Carolina, United States. As of the 2020 census, Hobgood had a population of 268. It is part of the Roanoke Rapids, North Carolina Micropolitan Statistical Area.

== Geography ==
According to the United States Census Bureau, the town has a total area of 1.0 square mile (2.6 km^{2}), all land.

== Demographics ==
Historical population
Census	Pop.	Note	%±
1900	122		—
1910	165		35.2%
1920	336		103.6%
1930	557		65.8%
1940	629		12.9%
1950	603		−4.1%
1960	630		4.5%
1970	530		−15.9%
1980	483		−8.9%
1990	435		−9.9%
2000	404		−7.1%
2010	348		−13.9%
2020	268		−23.0%
U.S. Decennial Census

=== Racial and ethnic composition ===
Hobgood town, North Carolina – Racial and ethnic composition Note: the US Census treats Hispanic/Latino as an ethnic category. This table excludes Latinos from the racial categories and assigns them to a separate category. Hispanics/Latinos may be of any race.
Race / Ethnicity (NH = Non-Hispanic)	Pop 2000	Pop 2010	Pop 2020	% 2000	% 2010	% 2020
White alone (NH)	191	160	132	47.28%	45.98%	49.25%
Black or African American alone (NH)	210	172	88	51.98%	49.43%	32.84%
Native American or Alaska Native alone (NH)	0	0	0	0.00%	0.00%	0.00%
Asian alone (NH)	0	0	0	0.00%	0.00%	0.00%
Native Hawaiian or Pacific Islander alone (NH)	0	0	0	0.00%	0.00%	0.00%
Other race alone (NH)	0	0	5	0.00%	0.00%	1.87%
Mixed race or Multiracial (NH)	0	2	9	0.00%	0.57%	3.36%
Hispanic or Latino (any race)	3	14	34	0.74%	4.02%	12.69%
Total	404	348	268	100.00%	100.00%	100.00%

=== 2000 census ===
As of the census of 2000, there were 404 people, 165 households, and 117 families residing in the town. The population density was 392.4 inhabitants per square mile (151.5/km^{2}). There were 202 housing units at an average density of 196.2 per square mile (75.8/km^{2}). The racial makeup of the town was 47.77% White and 52.23% African American. Hispanic or Latino of any race were 0.74% of the population.

There were 165 households, out of which 27.9% had children under the age of 18 living with them, 41.8% were married couples living together, 27.3% had a female householder with no husband present, and 28.5% were non-families. 26.1% of all households were made up of individuals, and 13.9% had someone living alone who was 65 years of age or older. The average household size was 2.45 and the average family size was 2.96.

In the town, the population was spread out, with 27.0% under the age of 18, 6.4% from 18 to 24, 23.5% from 25 to 44, 25.7% from 45 to 64, and 17.3% who were 65 years of age or older. The median age was 38 years. For every 100 females, there were 86.2 males. For every 100 females age 18 and over, there were 79.9 males.

The median income for a household in the town was $24,107, and the median income for a family was $31,500. Males had a median income of $25,625 versus $25,000 for females. The per capita income for the town was $16,622. About 19.4% of families and 24.9% of the population were below the poverty line, including 31.3% of those under age 18 and 23.5% of those age 65 or over.

== Notable person ==
Folk singer Tom Winslow was born in Hobgood.
