= Macclesfield, North Carolina =

- Town
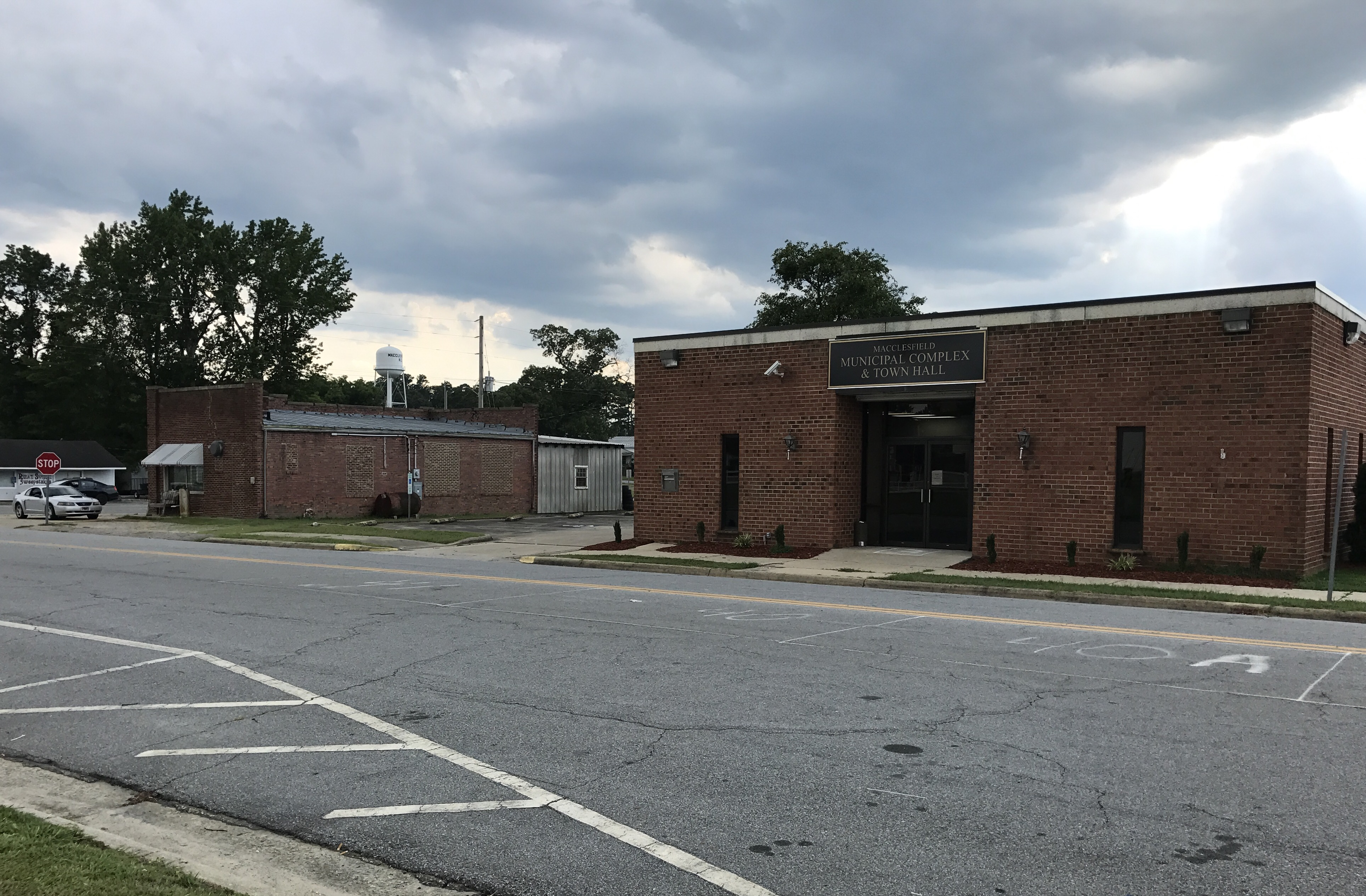

- Location in Edgecombe County and the state of North Carolina.
- Coordinates: 35°45′07″N 77°40′18″W
- Country: United States
- State: North Carolina
- County: Edgecombe

Area
  - Total: 0.55 sq mi (1.42 km^{2})
  - Land: 0.54 sq mi (1.40 km^{2})
  - Water: 0.0077 sq mi (0.02 km^{2})
- Elevation: 95 ft (29 m)

Population (2020)
  - Total: 413
  - Density: 761.5/sq mi (294.01/km^{2})
- Time zone: UTC-5 (Eastern (EST))
  - Summer (DST): UTC-4 (EDT)
- ZIP code: 27852
- Area code: 252
- FIPS code: 37-39960
- GNIS feature ID: 2406070
- Website: https://macclesfield.municipalimpact.com/

Macclesfield is a town in Edgecombe County, North Carolina, United States. It is part of the Rocky Mount, North Carolina Metropolitan Statistical Area. As of the 2020 census, Macclesfield had a population of 413.

== History ==
Macclesfield was started between 1900 and 1901 when the Tarboro, North Carolina businessman, Henry Clark Bridgers founded The Macclesfield Company. The Macclesfield Company bought land surrounding the tracks of East Carolina Railway in what is now Macclesfield and built warehouses and other buildings.

Bracebridge Hall was listed on the National Register of Historic Places in 1971, with a boundary increase in 2005.

== Geography ==
According to the United States Census Bureau, the town has a total area of 0.5 square miles (1.3 km^{2}), of which 0.5 square miles (1.3 km^{2}) is land and 1.96% is water.

== Demographics ==
Historical population
Census	Pop.	Note	%±
1970	536		—
1980	504		−6.0%
1990	493		−2.2%
2000	458		−7.1%
2010	471		2.8%
2020	413		−12.3%
U.S. Decennial Census

As of the census of 2000, there were 458 people, 209 households, and 142 families residing in the town. The population density was 903.9 inhabitants per square mile (349.0/km^{2}). There were 229 housing units at an average density of 451.9 per square mile (174.5/km^{2}). The racial makeup of the town was 81.44% White, 17.69% African American, 0.87% from other races. Hispanic or Latino of any race were 1.97% of the population.

There were 209 households, out of which 22.0% had children under the age of 18 living with them, 49.3% were married couples living together, 14.8% had a female householder with no husband present, and 31.6% were non-families. 31.1% of all households were made up of individuals, and 17.7% had someone living alone who was 65 years of age or older. The average household size was 2.19 and the average family size was 2.69.

In the town, the population was spread out, with 18.8% under the age of 18, 6.3% from 18 to 24, 24.7% from 25 to 44, 27.7% from 45 to 64, and 22.5% who were 65 years of age or older. The median age was 45 years. For every 100 females, there were 89.3 males. For every 100 females age 18 and over, there were 85.1 males.

The median income for a household in the town was $34,412, and the median income for a family was $36,806. Males had a median income of $27,750 versus $22,188 for females. The per capita income for the town was $17,042. About 5.9% of families and 7.9% of the population were below the poverty line, including 5.6% of those under age 18 and 17.4% of those age 65 or over.
