= Pinetops, North Carolina =

- Town
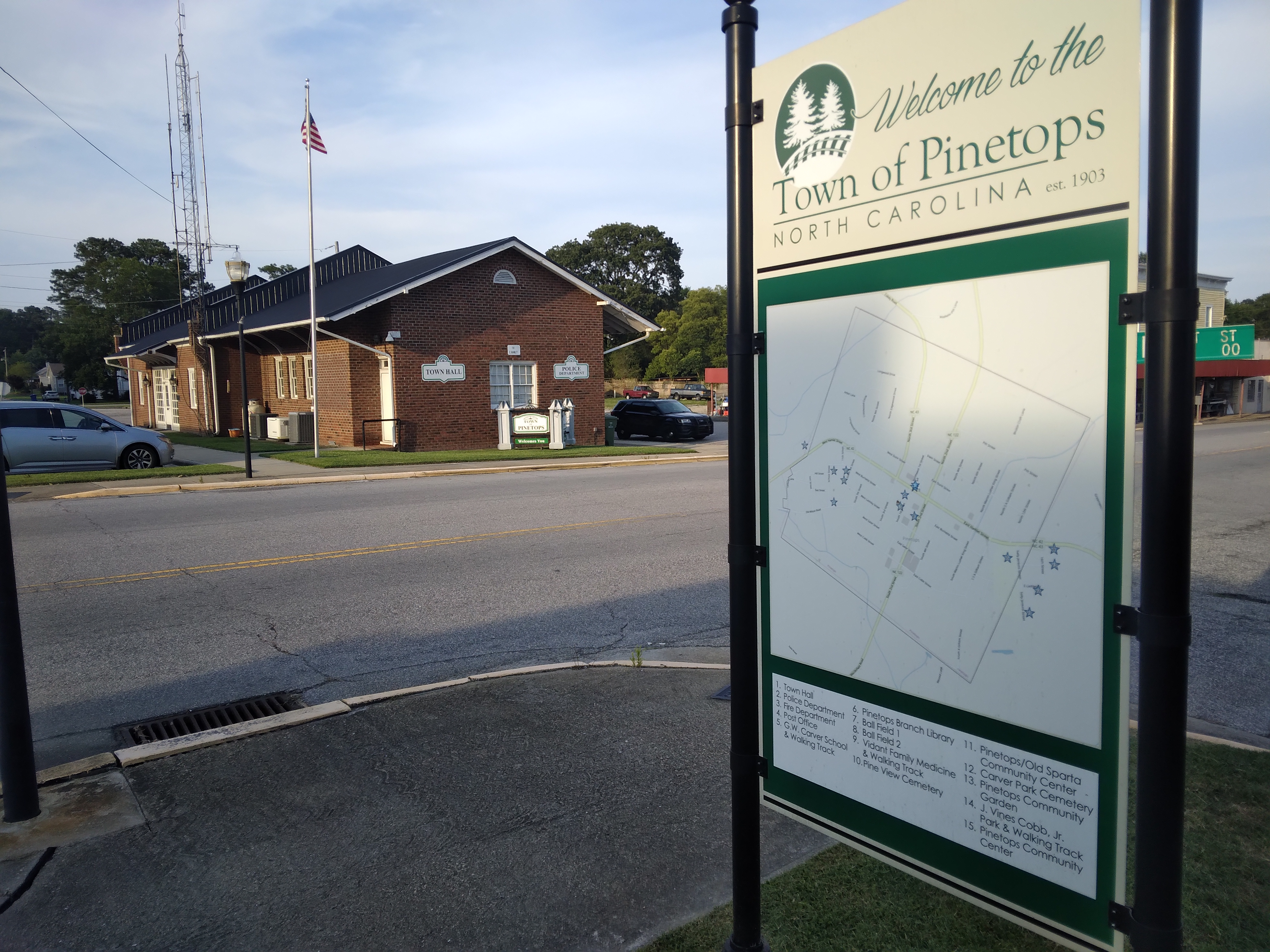

- Location in Edgecombe County and the state of North Carolina.
- Coordinates: 35°47′28″N 77°38′16″W
- Country: United States
- State: North Carolina
- County: Edgecombe

Area
  - Total: 1.03 sq mi (2.66 km^{2})
  - Land: 1.03 sq mi (2.66 km^{2})
  - Water: 0 sq mi (0.00 km^{2})
- Elevation: 105 ft (32 m)

Population (2020)
  - Total: 1,200
  - Density: 1,169.9/sq mi (451.72/km^{2})
- Time zone: UTC-5 (Eastern (EST))
  - Summer (DST): UTC-4 (EDT)
- ZIP code: 27864
- Area code: 252
- FIPS code: 37-52140
- GNIS feature ID: 2407122
- Website: townofpinetopsnc.com

Pinetops is a town in Edgecombe County, North Carolina, United States. It is part of the Rocky Mount, North Carolina Metropolitan Statistical Area. As of the 2020 census, Pinetops had a population of 1,200.

== History ==
The historic plantation house of Vinedale was listed on the National Register of Historic Places in 1982. Another historic plantation house, Adelphia, is located near Pinetops.

== Geography ==
According to the United States Census Bureau, the town has a total area of 1.0 square mile (2.6 km^{2}), all land.

== Demographics ==
Historical population
Census	Pop.	Note	%±
1910	211		—
1920	465		120.4%
1930	603		29.7%
1940	713		18.2%
1950	1,031		44.6%
1960	1,372		33.1%
1970	1,379		0.5%
1980	1,465		6.2%
1990	1,514		3.3%
2000	1,419		−6.3%
2010	1,374		−3.2%
2020	1,200		−12.7%
U.S. Decennial Census

=== Racial and ethnic composition ===
Pinetops town, North Carolina – Racial and ethnic composition Note: the US Census treats Hispanic/Latino as an ethnic category. This table excludes Latinos from the racial categories and assigns them to a separate category. Hispanics/Latinos may be of any race.
Race / Ethnicity (NH = Non-Hispanic)	Pop 2000	Pop 2010	Pop 2020	% 2000	% 2010	% 2020
White alone (NH)	599	466	413	42.21%	33.92%	34.42%
Black or African American alone (NH)	794	896	749	55.95%	65.21%	62.42%
Native American or Alaska Native alone (NH)	1	3	0	0.07%	0.22%	0.00%
Asian alone (NH)	0	0	0	0.00%	0.00%	0.00%
Native Hawaiian or Pacific Islander alone (NH)	0	0	0	0.00%	0.00%	0.00%
Other race alone (NH)	1	0	2	0.07%	0.00%	0.17%
Mixed race or Multiracial (NH)	5	5	13	0.35%	0.36%	1.08%
Hispanic or Latino (any race)	19	4	23	1.34%	0.29%	1.92%
Total	1,419	1,374	1,200	100.00%	100.00%	100.00%

=== 2020 census ===
As of the 2020 United States census, there were 1,200 people, 567 households, and 391 families residing in the town.

=== 2000 census ===
As of the census of 2000, there were 1,419 people, 557 households, and 391 families residing in the town. The population density was 1,415.0 inhabitants per square mile (546.3/km^{2}). There were 602 housing units at an average density of 600.3 per square mile (231.8/km^{2}). The racial makeup of the town was 42.21% White, 57.15% African American, 0.07% Native American, 0.21% from other races, and 0.35% from two or more races. Hispanic or Latino of any race were 1.34% of the population.

Located in the heart of eastern North Carolina; Pinetops is on the Raleigh-Greenville Corridor, located centrally between Greenville, Wilson and Rocky Mount.

There were 557 households, out of which 29.8% had children under the age of 18 living with them, 43.4% were married couples living together, 22.3% had a female householder with no husband present, and 29.8% were non-families. 27.1% of all households were made up of individuals, and 14.4% had someone living alone who was 65 years of age or older. The average household size was 2.55 and the average family size was 3.07.

In the town, the population was spread out, with 25.2% under the age of 18, 7.6% from 18 to 24, 25.2% from 25 to 44, 26.4% from 45 to 64, and 15.6% who were 65 years of age or older. The median age was 40 years. For every 100 females, there were 81.5 males. For every 100 females age 18 and over, there were 75.8 males.

The median income for a household in the town was $29,716, and the median income for a family was $36,544. Males had a median income of $29,688 versus $23,224 for females. The per capita income for the town was $15,763. About 17.6% of families and 20.8% of the population were below the poverty line, including 31.9% of those under age 18 and 21.3% of those age 65 or over.
