= National Register of Historic Places listings in Nash County, North Carolina =

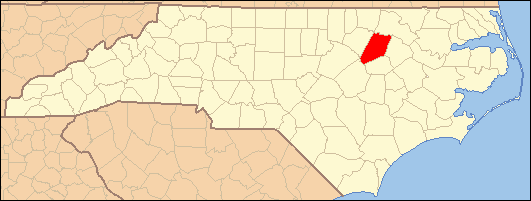

This list includes properties and districts listed on the National Register of Historic Places in Nash County, North Carolina. Click the "Map of all coordinates" link to the right to view an online map of all properties and districts with latitude and longitude coordinates in the table below.

== Current listings ==
This National Park Service list is complete through NPS recent listings posted November 21, 2025.

	Name on the Register	Image	Date listed	Location	City or town	Description
1	Gen. Joseph Arrington House	Gen. Joseph Arrington House	July 15, 1974 (#74001361)	SE of Hilliardston on SR 1500; 36°06′56″N 77°54′41″W	Hilliardston	
2	Bellamy's Mill	Bellamy's Mill	November 5, 1974 (#74001351)	SW of Enfield; 36°09′16″N 77°44′36″W	Enfield	
3	Bellamy-Philips House		July 12, 1982 (#82003491)	SR 1522; 36°03′07″N 77°47′00″W	Battleboro	
4	Bellemonte		December 21, 1989 (#89002132)	3400 N. Wesleyan Blvd. 36°00′56″N 77°46′17″W	Rocky Mount	
5	Benvenue		April 29, 1982 (#82003493)	330 Southern Blvd. 35°58′35″N 77°49′20″W	Rocky Mount	
6	Bissette-Cooley House	Bissette-Cooley House	September 19, 1985 (#85002414)	N. First and E. Washington Sts. 35°58′23″N 77°57′39″W	Nashville	
7	Black Jack		July 31, 1974 (#74001362)	North of Red Oak; 36°05′43″N 77°52′31″W	Red Oak	
8	Dr. Hassell Brantley House		August 14, 1986 (#86001647)	301 Branch St. 35°56′45″N 78°06′30″W	Spring Hope	
9	Burt-Arrington House		August 22, 2016 (#16000561)	784 W. Hilliardston Rd. 36°06′06″N 77°56′17″W	Hilliardston	
10	Caromount Mills, Inc. – Burlington Industries, Inc. Plant		August 26, 2019 (#100004320)	450 West Ridge St., 910 Carter St. 35°57′11″N 77°48′15″W	Rocky Mount	
11	Castalia School		June 18, 2018 (#100002597)	10445 Lancaster Store Rd. 36°04′41″N 78°04′06″W	Castalia	
12	Dortch House	Dortch House	December 26, 1972 (#72000979)	SR 1527 off NC 43; 36°00′35″N 77°51′36″W	Dortches	
13	Falls Road Historic District	Falls Road Historic District	November 12, 1999 (#99001367)	500-600 Avent St., 100-200 Braswell St., 100 Earl St., 400-700 Falls Rd., 500 Peachtree St. and 100 Wilkinson St. 35°57′03″N 77°47′52″W	Rocky Mount	
14	Dr. Franklin Hart Farm		July 21, 1988 (#88001050)	NC 48; 36°02′03″N 77°48′16″W	Drake	
15	Machaven	Machaven	November 25, 1980 (#80002890)	306 S. Grace St. 35°56′26″N 77°48′11″W	Rocky Mount	
16	The Meadows		May 16, 1974 (#74001360)	NW of Battleboro on SR 1510; 36°05′23″N 77°47′14″W	Battleboro	
17	Morgan School		September 15, 2006 (#06000867)	7427 Winters Rd. 35°49′18″N 78°08′14″W	Bailey	
18	Nash County Courthouse	Nash County Courthouse	May 10, 1979 (#79001739)	Washington St. between Drake and N. Court Sts. 35°58′32″N 77°58′06″W	Nashville	
19	Nashville Historic District	Nashville Historic District	July 22, 1987 (#87001185)	Roughly 100-400 W. Washington and 100-300 E. Washington Sts. 35°58′20″N 77°57′54″W	Nashville	
20	Red Oak Community House	Red Oak Community House	April 19, 2006 (#06000293)	Eastern side of Church St., approximately 0.1 miles (0.16 km) north of its junction with North Carolina Highway 43; 36°02′17″N 77°54′18″W	Red Oak	
21	Rocky Mount Central City Historic District	Rocky Mount Central City Historic District	June 19, 1980 (#80002826)	Portions of 26 blocks on Main, Washington, Church, Battle, Hammond, Hill, Howard, Ivy, Gay, Goldleaf, and Thomas Sts. 35°56′46″N 77°47′44″W	Rocky Mount	Present boundaries reflect a boundary increase and decrease of August 27, 2009; original boundaries were "roughly bounded by Robinson and Atlantic Aves. and Holly and Franklin Sts." Extends into Edgecombe County
22	Rocky Mount Electric Power Plant	Rocky Mount Electric Power Plant	July 15, 1982 (#82003494)	217 Andrews St. 35°56′13″N 77°48′01″W	Rocky Mount	
23	Rocky Mount Mills	Rocky Mount Mills	February 1, 1980 (#80002891)	NC 43 and NC 48; 35°57′33″N 77°48′10″W	Rocky Mount	
24	Rocky Mount Mills Village Historic District	Rocky Mount Mills Village Historic District	April 22, 1999 (#99000479)	Bounded by the Tar River, Columbia Ave., Spring St., and Carr St. 35°57′26″N 77°48′15″W	Rocky Mount	
25	Rose Hill	Rose Hill	April 28, 1982 (#82003492)	N of Nashville off NC 58; 36°00′04″N 78°01′31″W	Nashville	
26	Spring Hope Historic District		September 15, 1988 (#88001591)	Roughly bounded by Franklin, Louisburg, Second and Community Sts. 35°56′37″N 78°06′36″W	Spring Hope	
27	Stonewall		June 2, 1970 (#70000463)	Falls Rd. extension 35°57′26″N 77°48′29″W	Rocky Mount	
28	Sunset Avenue Public Works Historic District		April 10, 2025 (#100011660)	1590, 1609, 1619, 1660, and 1701 Sunset Avenue; 35°57′06″N 77°49′10″W	Rocky Mount	
29	Taylor's Mill		May 28, 1980 (#80002889)	SR 1120 W of SR 1124; 35°46′38″N 78°14′24″W	Middlesex	
30	Tobacco Growers Cooperative Association Warehouse		August 1, 2024 (#100010678)	723 Barnes Street; 35°58′09″N 77°58′18″W	Nashville	
31	Valentine-Wilder House		December 31, 2013 (#13001028)	8194 Webb's Mill Rd. 35°56′20″N 78°07′56″W	Spring Hope	
32	Villa Place Historic District	Villa Place Historic District	November 12, 1999 (#99001368)	200-300 S. Grace St., 400-600 Hammond St., 200-300 Howell St., 400-600 Nash St, 200-300 Pearl St., 200-300 Villa St.; also roughly along Chester St., Tillery St., NC 64, and Pearl St. 35°56′28″N 77°48′14″W	Rocky Mount	Second set of boundaries represents a boundary increase of September 6, 2002
33	West Haven Historic District	West Haven Historic District	September 6, 2002 (#02000931)	Roughly bounded by Lafayette and Pinecrest Aves., and the Tar River; 35°56′41″N 77°49′19″W	Rocky Mount	

== See also ==
- National Register of Historic Places listings in North Carolina
- List of National Historic Landmarks in North Carolina
