= Burt-Arrington House =

Plantation house in Nashville, North Carolina

- U.S. National Register of Historic Places
- Location: 784 W. Hilliardston Road Nashville, North Carolina, United States
- Built: ca. 1824
- Architectural style: Federal
- NRHP reference No.: 16000561
- Added to NRHP: 08/22/2016

The Burt-Arrington House, also known as the Burt-Woodruff-Cooper House, is a historic plantation house located in Nashville, North Carolina, near Hillardston. It is a double pile, two and half story Federal-style frame building. The plantation was once owned by Congressman Archibald Hunter Arrington, who served in the United States House of Representatives and in the Confederate States Congress.

== History ==
The house was built around 1824 for Dr. William Burt, a physician and planter. The house was built in the Federal style and has Greek Revival-style interior details. The house features six fireplaces, 11-foot ceilings, five bedrooms, and a sunroom.

In 1838, the property was sold to Dr. John Arrington for $6,000. He sold the property, comprising the house and a one-hundred-and-nineteen-acre estate, to his first cousin, Archibald Hunter Arrington, on September 25, 1847. Arrington's son, John Peter Arrington, who served as sheriff of Nash County and later as a member of the state's Department of Agriculture, inherited the plantation from his father on October 22, 1874. He and his wife, Laura Maud Philips Arrington, sold the property to his brother-in-law, Judge William Lewis Thorp, who served as the mayor of Rocky Mount, on November 6, 1876. He and his wife sold the plantation to George W. Abrams on December 19, 1902, who in turn sold it to the tobaccosit Alfred Plummer Williams and L.F. Williams on December 17, 1906. Williams sold the house to the farmer and merchant William Frederick Woodruff and Nannie Bette Williams Woodruff on January 30, 1924. The Woodruff family continued to operate the estate as a farm during this time. Their daughter, Nancy Woodruff Broadwell, and her husband, Waverly C. Broadwell, sold the property to Thomas Arrington Cooper, Jr. and Christine Richardson Cooper on December 13, 1961. Their daughter, Alice Cooper Pearcey, inherited the property and sold it to Thomas and Susan Moore on July 2, 2007. The Moores removed a one-story full facade porch that was added to the house in the 20th century, and removed aluminum siding and exposed original wooden weatherboard siding. They also painted the exterior siding, conserved original windows, installed modern plumbing and electrical systems, updated the house's bathrooms, and restored the property's outbuildings.
