= Jack Finch =

Jack Finch may refer to:

- Jack Finch (conservationist) (1917–2006), American conservationist
- Jack Finch (footballer, born 1996), English footballer
- Jack Finch (footballer, born 1909) (1909–1993), English footballer and manager
