= Archibald Hunter Arrington =

American politician

Archibald H. Arrington
- Born: Archibald Hunter Arrington; November 13, 1809 near Nashville, North Carolina, U.S.
- Died: July 20, 1872 (aged 62) near Nashville, North Carolina, U.S.
- Occupations: Lawyer and politician

Archibald Hunter Arrington (November 13, 1809 – July 20, 1872) was an American politician and lawyer who served as a U.S. representative from North Carolina from 1841 to 1845 and a member of the Confederate Congress during the American Civil War.

== Biography ==
Born near in 1809, Arrington attended a local academy in Hilliardston and then Louisburg College. Although he studied law, he was also a significant landowner and slave owner.

=== Congress ===
In 1840, Arrington was elected as a Democrat to the U.S. House; he served for two terms, in the 27th and 28th Congresses. (March 4, 1841 – March 3, 1845) He sought re-election in 1844, but was defeated and failed to gain a third term.

=== Civil War ===
Arrington was a supporter of the Confederacy during the Civil War—he was a member of North Carolina's secession convention in 1861 and was a member of the First Confederate Congress, although he was defeated for re-election in 1863.

=== Later career ===
After the Civil War, Arrington was a delegate to the Union National Convention at Philadelphia in 1866. He was chairman of the court of common pleas and quarter sessions for Nash County in 1866 and 1867, and became a county commissioner in 1868. After departing politics, he engaged in the management of his estate.

=== Death and burial ===
He died on his plantation in 1872 and is buried in a family graveyard.

U.S. House of Representatives
Preceded by Micajah T. Hawkins	Member of the U.S. House of Representatives from North Carolina's 6th congressional district 1841–1843	Succeeded by James I. McKay
Preceded by Romulus M. Saunders	Member of the U.S. House of Representatives from North Carolina's 8th congressional district 1843–1845	Succeeded by Henry Selby Clark
