= Bailey, North Carolina =

- Town
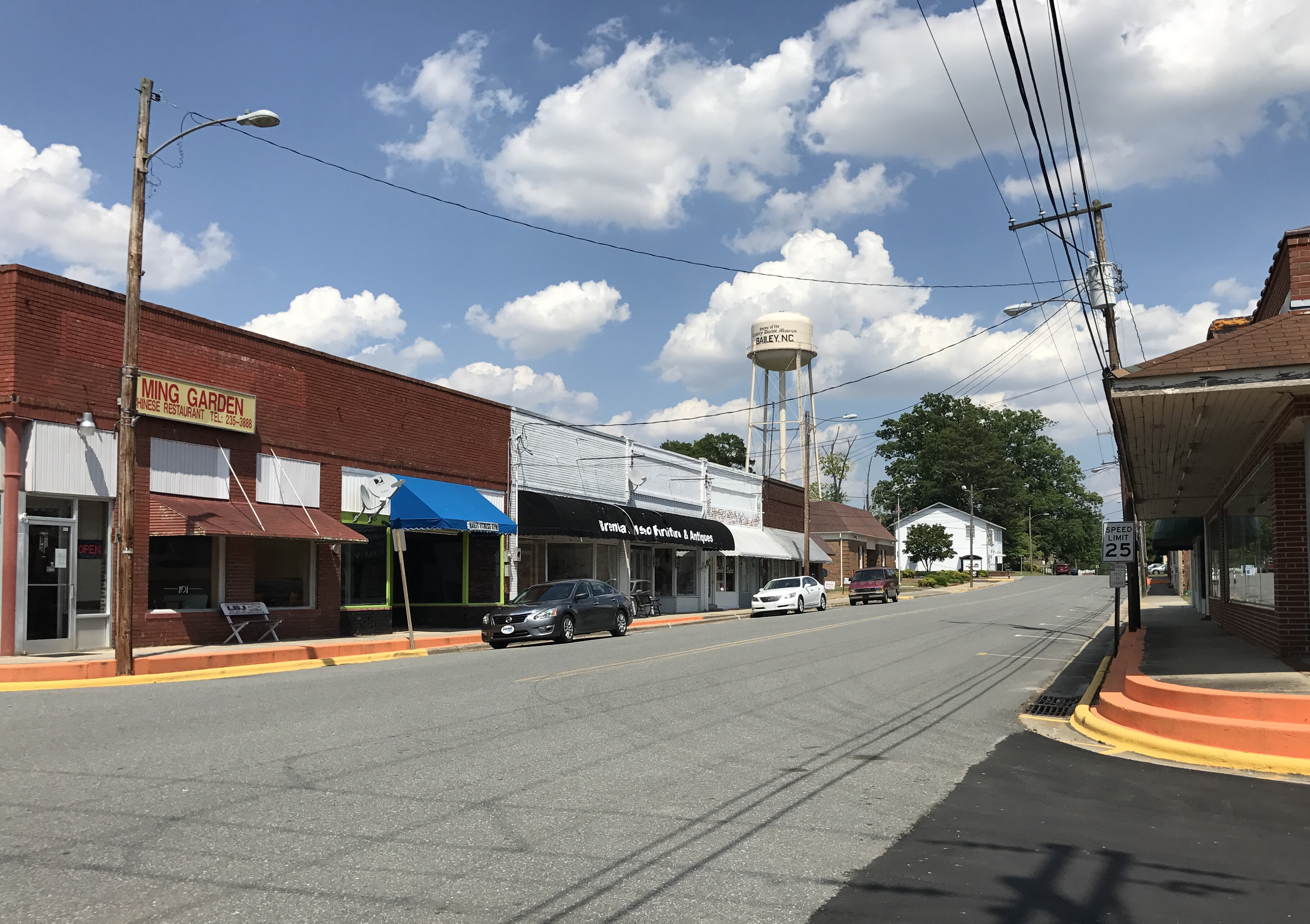

- Location in Nash County and the state of North Carolina.
- Coordinates: 35°46′50″N 78°06′47″W
- Country: United States
- State: North Carolina
- County: Nash

Area
  - Total: 0.70 sq mi (1.82 km^{2})
  - Land: 0.70 sq mi (1.82 km^{2})
  - Water: 0 sq mi (0.00 km^{2})
- Elevation: 249 ft (76 m)

Population (2020)
  - Total: 568
  - Density: 809.2/sq mi (312.43/km^{2})
- Time zone: UTC-5 (Eastern (EST))
  - Summer (DST): UTC-4 (EDT)
- ZIP code: 27807
- Area code: 252
- FIPS code: 37-03020
- GNIS feature ID: 2405197
- Website: https://www.townofbaileync.org/

Bailey is a town in Nash County, North Carolina, United States. It is part of the Rocky Mount, North Carolina Metropolitan Statistical Area. The population was 566 at the 2020 census.

== History ==
The Morgan School was listed on the National Register of Historic Places in 2006.

== Geography ==
According to the United States Census Bureau, the town has a total area of 0.7 square miles (1.8 km^{2}), all land.

== Demographics ==
Historical population
Census	Pop.	Note	%±
1910	195		—
1920	518		165.6%
1930	631		21.8%
1940	645		2.2%
1950	743		15.2%
1960	795		7.0%
1970	724		−8.9%
1980	685		−5.4%
1990	553		−19.3%
2000	670		21.2%
2010	569		−15.1%
2020	568		−0.2%
U.S. Decennial Census

At the 2000 census there were 670 people, 274 households, and 184 families in the town. The population density was 955.8 inhabitants per square mile (369.0/km^{2}). There were 302 housing units at an average density of 430.8 per square mile (166.3/km^{2}). The racial makeup of the town was 67.91% White, 22.84% African American, 7.46% from other races, and 1.79% from two or more races. Hispanic or Latino of any race were 10.75%.

Of the 274 households 26.3% had children under the age of 18 living with them, 52.6% were married couples living together, 10.9% had a female householder with no husband present, and 32.5% were non-families. 29.2% of households were one person and 13.5% were one person aged 65 or older. The average household size was 2.45 and the average family size was 2.98.

The age distribution was 23.6% under the age of 18, 9.3% from 18 to 24, 26.9% from 25 to 44, 22.2% from 45 to 64, and 18.1% 65 or older. The median age was 38 years. For every 100 females, there were 97.1 males. For every 100 females age 18 and over, there were 88.2 males.

The median household income was $36,328 and the median family income was $43,750. Males had a median income of $33,929 versus $25,179 for females. The per capita income for the town was $21,910. About 6.7% of families and 11.2% of the population were below the poverty line, including 21.4% of those under age 18 and 7.9% of those age 65 or over.

== Notable people ==
- Thomas Bradshaw, a Black man hunted down and murdered by a mob in 1927
- Jack Finch, conservationist of eastern bluebirds
- Julius Peppers, former defensive end for the NFL's Carolina Panthers
- Tarheel Slim, singer
- Zonovan Knight, running back for the NFL's New York Jets
