= Harold D. Cooley =

American politician

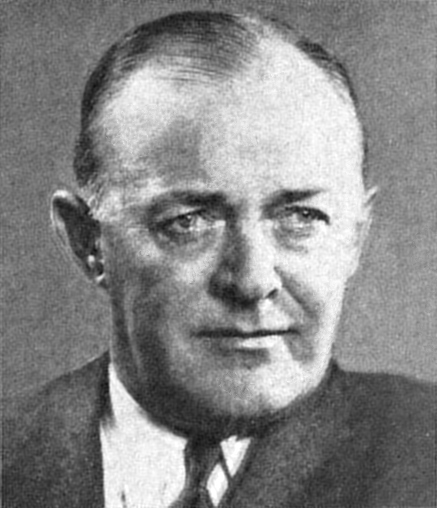

Chair of the House Agriculture Committee
- In office January 3, 1955 – December 30, 1966
- Preceded by: Clifford R. Hope
- Succeeded by: William R. Poage
- In office January 3, 1949 – January 3, 1953
- Preceded by: Clifford R. Hope
- Succeeded by: Clifford R. Hope

Member of the U.S. House of Representatives from North Carolina's 4th district
- In office July 7, 1934 – December 30, 1966
- Preceded by: Edward W. Pou
- Succeeded by: Jim Gardner

Personal details
- Born: July 26, 1897 Nashville, North Carolina, U.S.
- Died: January 15, 1974 (aged 76) Wilson, North Carolina, U.S.
- Party: Democratic
- Education: University of North Carolina, Yale University Law School
- Occupation: lawyer

Harold Dunbar Cooley (July 26, 1897 – January 15, 1974) was an American politician of the Democratic Party. He represented the Fourth Congressional district of North Carolina from 1934 to 1966.

== Background ==
He was born on July 26, 1897, in Nashville, North Carolina. He was a graduate of the University of North Carolina at Chapel Hill and Yale University Law School.

== Career ==
He was a private practice lawyer and military veteran, serving in the United States Naval Aviation Flying Corps during World War I. He was a member of the Interparliamentary Conferences held at Cairo, Egypt, 1947 and at Rome, Italy, 1948 and served as president of the American group for two four-year terms.

On July 7, 1934, he was elected as a Democrat to the Seventy-third Congress by special election to fill the vacancy caused by the death of United States Representative Edward W. Pou. He was subsequently reelected 16 times, serving until his resignation on December 30, 1966. Cooley remains the longest-serving Chairman of the House Committee on Agriculture in history. In 1947-8, he served on the Herter Committee. He was one of the few Southern Congressmen not to sign the 1956 Southern Manifesto that opposed the desegregation of public schools ordered by the Supreme Court in Brown v. Board of Education. However, Cooley voted against the Civil Rights Act of 1957, the original version of the Civil Rights Act of 1960 (while abstaining on the final version), the Civil Rights Act of 1964, the 24th Amendment to the U.S. Constitution, and the Voting Rights Act of 1965. Nevertheless, during the course of his Congressional career, Cooley supported various progressive measures such as those related to social security, the minimum wage, food stamps, and healthcare.

He was nearly defeated in 1964 by Republican James Carson Gardner and then lost to Gardner by a stunning 13-point upset in 1966.

== Death ==
He died on January 15, 1974, in Wilson, N.C. and is buried in Forest Hill Cemetery, Nashville, N.C.

== Legacy ==
His home at Nashville, the Bissette-Cooley House, was listed on the National Register of Historic Places in 1985.

U.S. House of Representatives
Preceded by Edward W. Pou	Member of the U.S. House of Representatives from North Carolina's 4th congressional district 1934–1966	Succeeded by James C. Gardner
Preceded by Clifford R. Hope	Chairman of the House Agriculture Committee; 1955–1966	Succeeded by William R. Poage
Preceded by Clifford R. Hope	Chairman of the House Agriculture Committee; 1949–1953	Succeeded by Clifford R. Hope
