= Clinton Wesley Battle =

American freed slave and politician

Clinton Wesley Battle (September 27, 1849 – May 15, 1927) was an American politician in North Carolina during and after the Reconstruction era. He represented Edgecombe County in the North Carolina House of Representatives in 1879 and 1881.

== Early life ==
Clinton Wesley Battle was born on September 27, 1849, in Edgecombe County, North Carolina. He was enslaved at birth. He was educated at Shaw University in Raleigh. He married Siddie Ann Bryant on April 6, 1876, and had a child with her.

== Career ==
From 1874 to 1876 Battle served as a trustee of Swift Creek Township in Edgecombe and then served two years as a county commissioner before being elected to the North Carolina House of Representatives as a Republican in 1878. He was re-elected in 1880.

Battle later served as a postmaster in Battleboro in Nash County from November 11, 1897, until February 1, 1900. He was arrested on March 8 and accused of embezzling $400 in money order funds and failing to deposit funds for the post office. He was convicted and sentenced to serve nine months in prison.

== Later life ==
Battle died at his home in Washington D.C. on May 15, 1927.

== See also ==
- African American officeholders from the end of the Civil War until before 1900
- List of first African-American U.S. state legislators

== Works cited ==
- Justesen, Benjamin R. (2005). "Black Tip, White Iceberg: Black Postmasters and the Rise of White Supremacy in North Carolina, 1897–1901". The North Carolina Historical Review. 82 (2): 193–227. JSTOR 23523507.
- Justesen, Benjamin R. (2012). George Henry White: An Even Chance in the Race of Life (reprint ed.). Baton Rouge: Louisiana State University Press. ISBN 9780807144770.
- Tomlinson, J. S. (1879). Tar Heel sketch-book. A brief biographical sketch of the life and public acts of the members of the General Assembly of North Carolina. Session of 1879. Raleigh, North Carolina: Raleigh News Steam Book and Job Office – via Internet Archive.
