= Bellamy-Philips House =

Historic house in North Carolina, United States

- U.S. National Register of Historic Places
- Location within North Carolina Location within the United States
- Location: SR 1522, near Battleboro, North Carolina
- Coordinates: 36°3′7″N 77°47′00″W
- Area: 25 acres (10 ha)
- Built: 1905
- Built by: Rose, D. J.
- Architectural style: Mixed (more Than 2 Styles From Different Periods)
- NRHP reference No.: 82003491
- Added to NRHP: July 12, 1982

Bellamy-Philips House (also known as Oak Forest Plantation) is a historic plantation house and a later home located near Battleboro, Nash County, North Carolina.

== Description and history ==
The Green House dates to the early 19th century, and is a two-story three-bay, single pile, Late Georgian/Federal style frame dwelling. The Philips House was built in 1905, and is a cubical two-story, two room deep central hall plan frame dwelling with a pyramidal slate roof. It features a one-story front porch with a conical roofed circular Classical Revival portico and Ionic order columns.

It was listed on the National Register of Historic Places on July 12, 1982.
