= Victor Worsley =

American football player (born 1984)

No. 51
- Position: Linebacker

Personal information
- Born: April 24, 1984 (age 42); Battleboro, North Carolina, U.S.
- Listed height: 6 ft 1 in (1.85 m)
- Listed weight: 234 lb (106 kg)

Career information
- College: North Carolina
- NFL draft: 2007: undrafted

Career history
- Indianapolis Colts (2007)

Career NFL statistics
- Total tackles: 2
- Stats at Pro Football Reference

Victor Worsley (born April 24, 1984) is an American former professional football player who was a linebacker in the National Football League (NFL). He was originally signed by the Colts as an undrafted free agent in 2007. He played college football for the North Carolina Tar Heels.Worsley was released during the final cuts of the 2008 season.

== Early life ==
Victor attended North Edgecombe High School, where he was a four-year starter at linebacker and also played fullback.
