= Lynching of Thomas Bradshaw =

1927 lynching of a Black man in North Carolina

Coordinates: 35°46′49″N 78°6′56″W

Thomas Bradshaw was an African-American man who was lynched by a mob in Bailey, North Carolina, in August 1927.

Bradshaw was accused of rape and arrested, but in "what appeared to be a mob orchestrated maneuver, he was allowed to escape arrest. He was then patiently chased and hunted over two days and nights before being captured, exhausted, and then murdered by a group of white men who went unpunished."

John R. Steelman, who wrote his PhD dissertation on "mob action in the South", listed Thomas Bradshaw as one of the cases, and said Bradshaw, after "being shot five times by a posse in Nash County, in 1927, fell dead 'on account of heart failure from fatigue' according to the coroner's jury."
