= The Meadows (Battleboro, North Carolina) =

Historic house in North Carolina, United States

- U.S. National Register of Historic Places
- Location within North Carolina Location within the United States
- Location: NW of Battleboro on SR 1510, near Battleboro, North Carolina
- Coordinates: 36°5′23″N 77°47′14″W
- Area: 40 acres (16 ha)
- Architectural style: Federal
- NRHP reference No.: 74001360
- Added to NRHP: May 16, 1974

The Meadows, also known as the Robert Carter Hilliard House, is a historic plantation house located near Battleboro, Nash County, North Carolina. It dates to the early-19th century, and is a two-story, five bay by two bay, Federal style dwelling with a one-story rear shed addition. It is sheathed in weatherboard, a low-pitched gable roof, and double-shoulder exterior end chimneys. The front facade features a one-story replacement porch covering the center three bays.

It was listed on the National Register of Historic Places in 1974.
