= Ray Murray =

American baseball player (1917–2003)

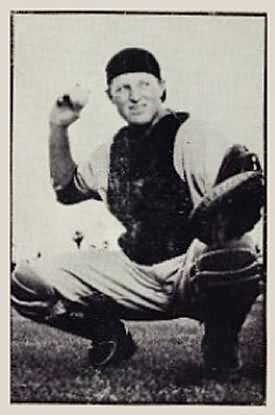
- Catcher
- Born: October 12, 1917; Spring Hope, North Carolina, U.S.
- Died: April 9, 2003 (aged 85); Fort Worth, Texas, U.S.
- Batted: Right Threw: Right

MLB debut
- April 25, 1948, for the Cleveland Indians

Last MLB appearance
- September 25, 1954, for the Baltimore Orioles

MLB statistics
- Batting average: .252
- Home runs: 8
- Runs batted in: 80
- Stats at Baseball Reference

Teams
- Cleveland Indians (1948, 1950–1951); Philadelphia Athletics (1951–1953); Baltimore Orioles (1954)

Raymond Lee Murray (October 12, 1917 – April 9, 2003) was an American professional baseball player and manager. A catcher, he appeared in 250 games played over all or parts of six seasons for the Cleveland Indians (1948; 1950–1951), Philadelphia Athletics (1951–1953) and Baltimore Orioles (1954). The native of Spring Hope, North Carolina, threw and batted right-handed, stood 6 feet 3 inches (1.91 m) tall and weighed 204 pounds (93 kg). He was a veteran of the United States Army Air Forces during World War II.

== Major league career ==
Murray was a backup catcher to Jim Hegan in Cleveland, Joe Tipton in Philadelphia, and Clint Courtney in Baltimore. As a member of the Athletics in 1953, he shared the regular catcher's job with Joe Astroth and set personal bests in every major statistical category, including games played (84), hits (76), home runs (six), runs batted in (41) and batting average (.284). All told, he batted .252 with eight homers and 184 hits during his MLB career. He later managed in minor league baseball in the San Francisco Giants' organization.

Murray was a talented catcher with a big bat and a strong throwing arm. In his short career he allowed very few stolen bases (he notched 69 "caught stealings" in 1,803 innings caught) and quickly gained recognition as a gun slinger at the plate. Murray was known for his colorful antics with the umpires, which may have earned him the nickname "Deacon" for the way he preached to the umps. On one occasion, he stopped in the middle of a game and removed all of his catchers' gear to kneel at home plate and pray to the Lord to give the umpire eyesight because he must be blind, Murray was promptly ejected from the game.

== Post-career life ==
After his baseball career Murray lived until his death in Fort Worth, Texas. He worked for many years for the Tarrant County sheriffs department as a warrant officer until his retirement. Murray raised two children, Buddy and Jill, he was involved in little league baseball for many years. He served as president of the Forest Hill youth association in the 1970s and managed several pony and colt league boys teams. Murray was also a very accomplished golfer carrying a scratch handicap up into his 50s, he was a longtime member of Glen Garden Country Club in Ft. Worth and also a winner of their club championship.
