= Gen. Joseph Arrington House =

Historic house in North Carolina, United States

- U.S. National Register of Historic Places
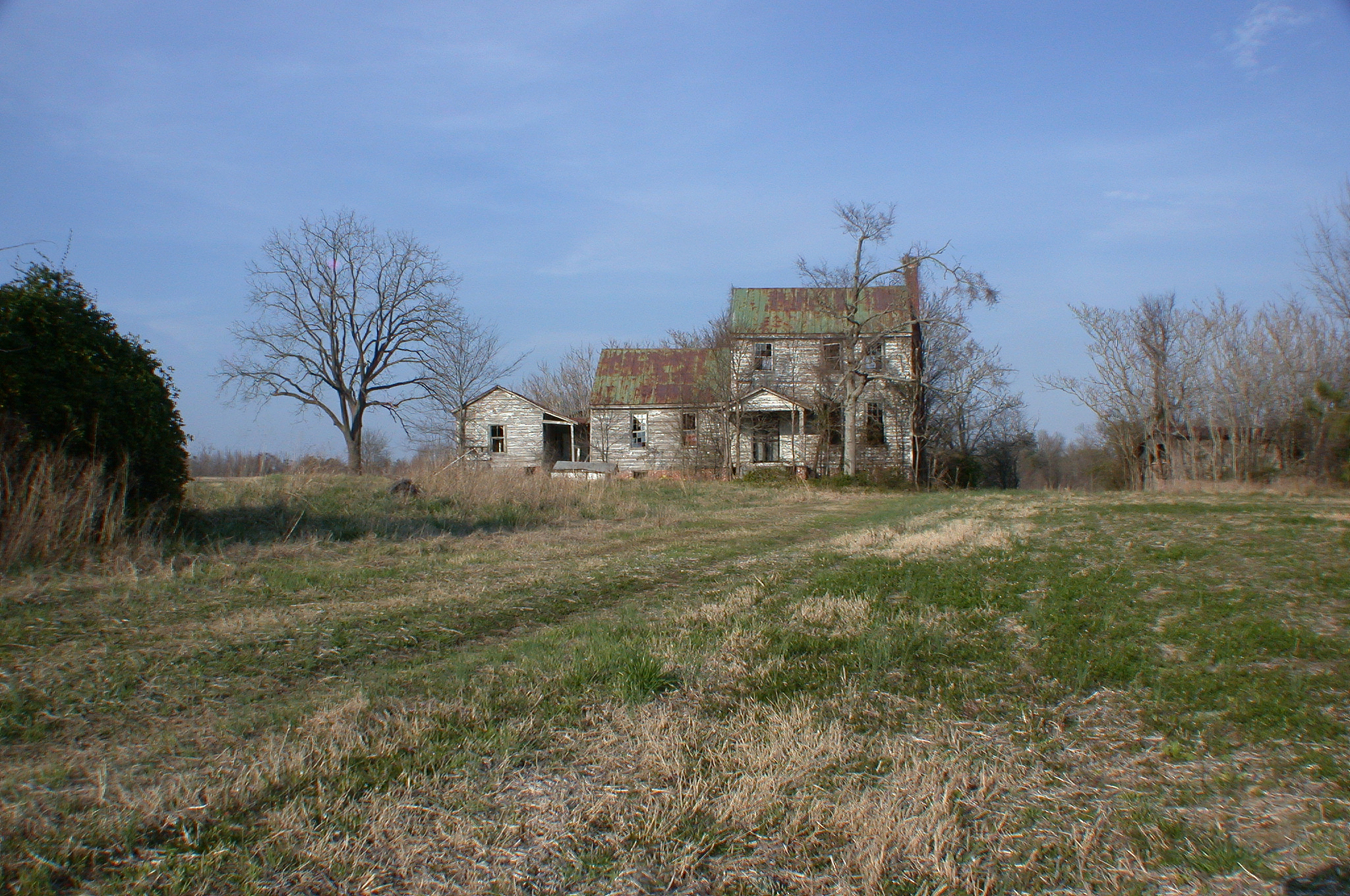
- Gen. Joseph Arrington House in 2004

- Location within North Carolina Location within the United States
- Location: SE of Hilliardston on SR 1500, near Hilliardston, North Carolina
- Coordinates: 36°6′56″N 77°54′41″W
- Area: 9.5 acres (3.8 ha)
- Built: 1800-1810
- Architectural style: Georgian, Federal
- NRHP reference No.: 74001361
- Added to NRHP: July 15, 1974

The Gen. Joseph Arrington House (also known as the Lewis House and Little Falls Plantation) is a historic plantation house located near Hilliardston, Nash County, North Carolina.

== Description and history ==
It consists of two sections: a one-story, two-bay, frame section with a Georgian style interior and a two-story, three-bay, frame section with vernacular Federal style interiors. It sits on a brick cellar and has gable roofs on both sections. The two-story section features two double-shoulder, brick exterior end chimneys.

It was listed on the National Register of Historic Places on July 15, 1974.
