= Dortches, North Carolina =

- Town
- Location in Nash County and the state of North Carolina.
- Coordinates: 36°0′41″N 77°51′29″W
- Country: United States
- State: North Carolina
- County: Nash

Area
  - Total: 8.09 sq mi (20.95 km^{2})
  - Land: 8.09 sq mi (20.95 km^{2})
  - Water: 0 sq mi (0.00 km^{2})
- Elevation: 197 ft (60 m)

Population (2020)
  - Total: 1,082
  - Density: 133.8/sq mi (51.65/km^{2})
- Time zone: UTC-5 (Eastern (EST))
  - Summer (DST): UTC-4 (EDT)
- FIPS code: 37-17520
- GNIS feature ID: 0984273
- Website: https://dortchesnc.govoffice2.com/

Dortches is a town in Nash County, North Carolina, United States. It is part of the Rocky Mount, NC Metropolitan Statistical Area. The population was 1,082 in 2020.

== History ==
The Dortch House was listed on the National Register of Historic Places in 1972. On July 19, 2023, a EF3 tornado would strike the town, destroying many homes and leveling half of a local Pfizer plant. This tornado would stay on the ground for 16.5 miles.

== Geography ==
According to the United States Census Bureau, the town has a total area of 7.7 square miles (20 km^{2}), all land.

== Demographics ==
Historical population
Census	Pop.	Note	%±
1980	885		—
1990	840		−5.1%
2000	809		−3.7%
2010	935		15.6%
2020	1,082		15.7%
U.S. Decennial Census

As of the census of 2000, there were 809 people, 329 households, and 235 families residing in the town. The population density was 105.1 people per square mile (40.6 people/km^{2}). There were 351 housing units at an average density of 45.6 per square mile (17.6/km^{2}). The racial makeup of the town was 77.75% White, 20.40% African American, 0.37% Native American, 0.12% Pacific Islander, 0.37% from other races, and 0.99% from two or more races. Hispanic or Latino of any race were 1.85% of the population.

There were 329 households, out of which 29.2% had children under the age of 18 living with them, 59.6% were married couples living together, 7.6% had a female householder with no husband present, and 28.3% were non-families. 26.1% of all households were made up of individuals, and 14.9% had someone living alone who was 65 years of age or older. The average household size was 2.46 and the average family size was 2.96.

In the town, the population was spread out, with 22.6% under the age of 18, 6.6% from 18 to 24, 25.5% from 25 to 44, 32.1% from 45 to 64, and 13.2% who were 65 years of age or older. The median age was 42 years. For every 100 females, there were 91.3 males. For every 100 females age 18 and over, there were 89.1 males.

The median income for a household in the town was $35,417, and the median income for a family was $52,250. Males had a median income of $31,635 versus $23,375 for females. The per capita income for the town was $24,287. About 1.3% of families and 4.4% of the population were below the poverty line, including 3.1% of those under age 18 and 10.1% of those age 65 or over.
