= Morgan School =

Historic school building in North Carolina, United States

- U.S. National Register of Historic Places
- Location within North Carolina Location within the United States
- Location: 7427 Winters Rd., Bailey, North Carolina
- Coordinates: 35°49′18″N 78°8′14″W
- Area: less than one acre
- Built: 1925-1926
- Architectural style: Rosenwald School
- NRHP reference No.: 06000867
- Added to NRHP: September 15, 2006

Morgan School is a historic Rosenwald School located at Bailey, Nash County, North Carolina. It was built in 1925–1926, and is a one-story, side-gabled shallow "T" frame building on a brick foundation. The school contained two classrooms and measures roughly 30 feet by 60 feet. The school closed in 1956, and it was converted to a private residence soon after.

It was listed on the National Register of Historic Places in 2006.
