= Bissette-Cooley House =

Historic house in North Carolina, United States

- U.S. National Register of Historic Places
- U.S. Historic district – Contributing property
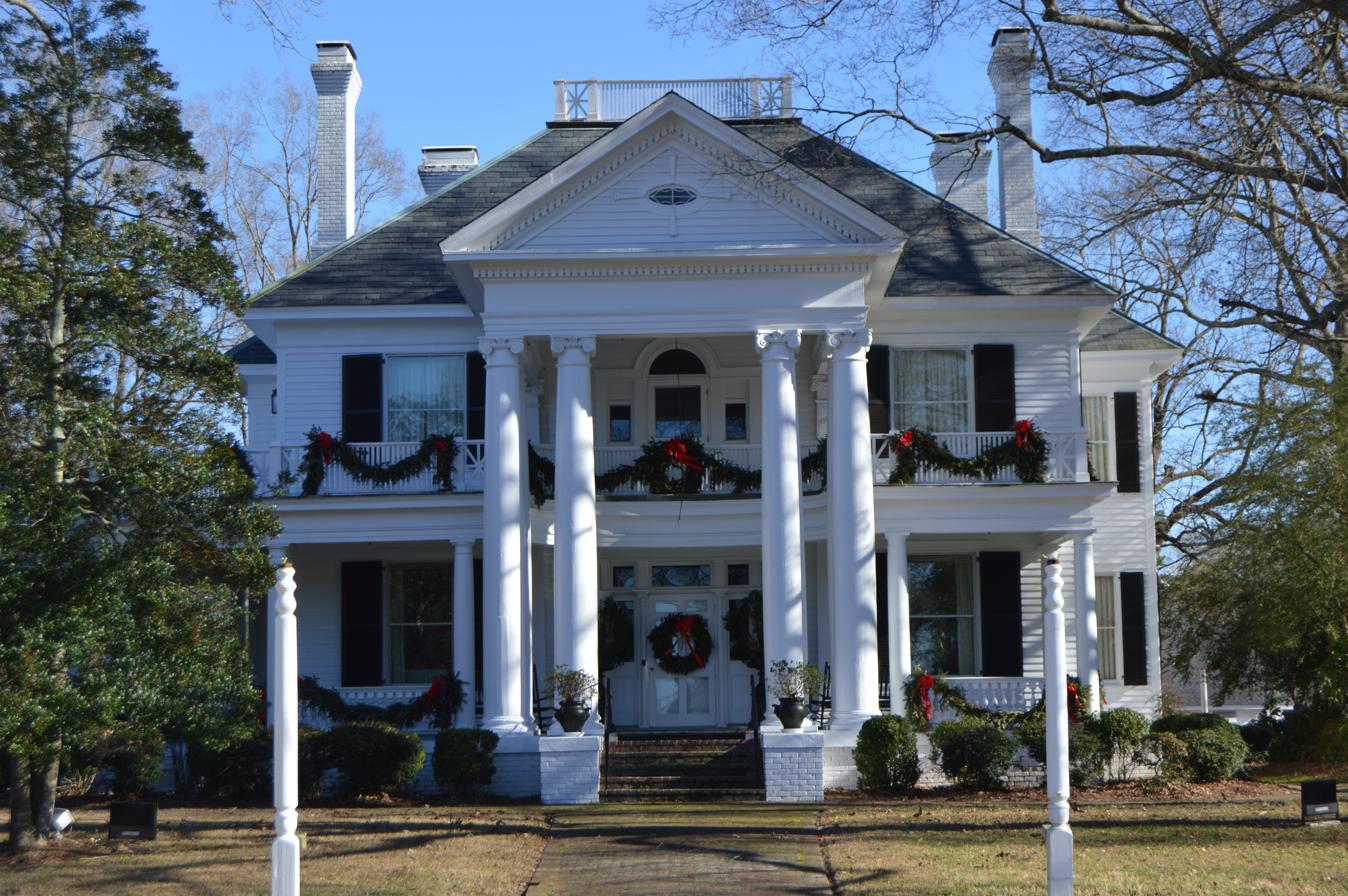
- Facade

- Location within North Carolina Location within the United States
- Location: N. First & E. Washington Sts., Nashville, North Carolina
- Coordinates: 35°58′28″N 77°57′57″W
- Area: 1.3 acres (0.53 ha)
- Built: 1911
- Architect: John C. Stout
- Architectural style: Classical Revival
- NRHP reference No.: 85002414
- Added to NRHP: September 19, 1985

Bissette-Cooley House is a historic home located at Nashville, Nash County, North Carolina. It was built in 1911, and is a two-story, double pile central hall plan Classical Revival frame dwelling. It has a slate covered, steeply pitched hipped roof topped with a broad deck. It features a full-height pedimented portico overlapping a one-story wraparound porch. It was the home of Congressman Harold D. Cooley.

It was listed on the National Register of Historic Places in 1985. It is located in the Nashville Historic District.
