= Villa Place Historic District =

Historic district in North Carolina, United States

- U.S. National Register of Historic Places
- U.S. Historic district
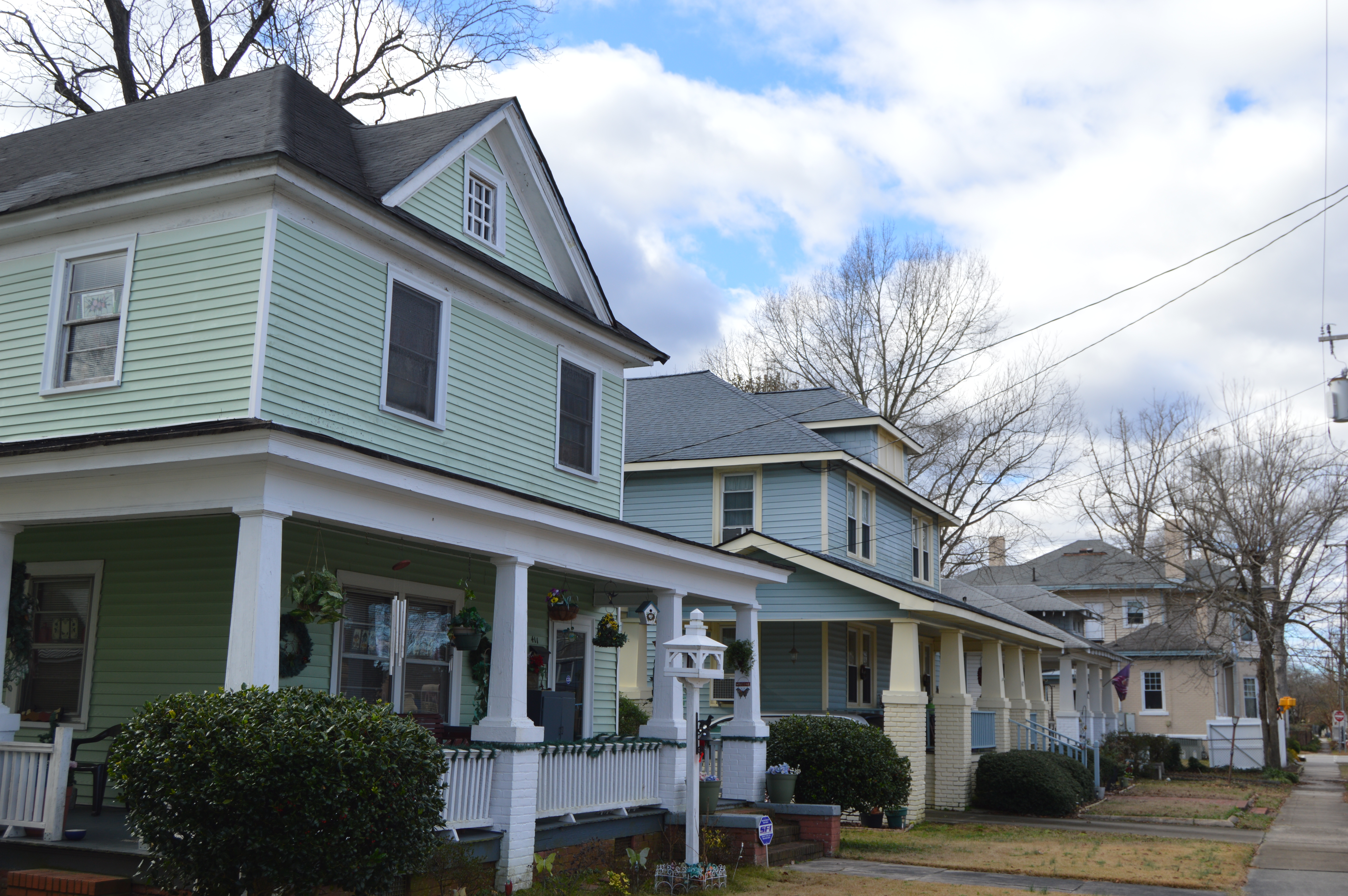
- 400 block of Nash Street

- Location within North Carolina Location within the United States
- Location: 200-300 S. Grace St., 400-600 Hammond St., 200-300 Howell St., 400-600 Nash St, 200-300 Pearl St., 200-300 Villa St.; Roughly along Chester St., Tillery St., NC 64, and Pearl St., Rocky Mount, North Carolina
- Coordinates: 35°56′28″N 77°48′14″W
- Area: 66 acres (27 ha)
- Built: 1908
- Architect: John C. Stout, et al.
- Architectural style: Queen Anne, Classical Revival, Bungalow/craftsman, Colonial Revival
- NRHP reference No.: 99001368, 02000942 (Boundary Increase)
- Added to NRHP: November 12, 1999, September 6, 2002 (Boundary Increase)

Villa Place Historic District is a national historic district located at Rocky Mount, Nash County, North Carolina. It encompasses 321 contributing buildings and 1 contributing structure in a residential section of Rocky Mount. The buildings primarily date between about 1900 and 1950, and include notable examples of Queen Anne, Colonial Revival, Classical Revival, and Bungalow / American Craftsman style residential architecture. Located in the district is the separately listed Machaven. Other notable buildings include the W.D. Cochran House (c. 1900), Mills-Watson House (c. 1914), Aladdin Homes Company "kit houses," the James Craig Braswell School (1940), Draine Confectionery (c. 1930), and West End Grocery (c. 1930).

It was listed on the National Register of Historic Places in 1999, with a boundary increase in 2002.
