= Nashville Historic District (Nashville, North Carolina) =

Historic district in Nash County, North Carolina

- U.S. National Register of Historic Places
- U.S. Historic district
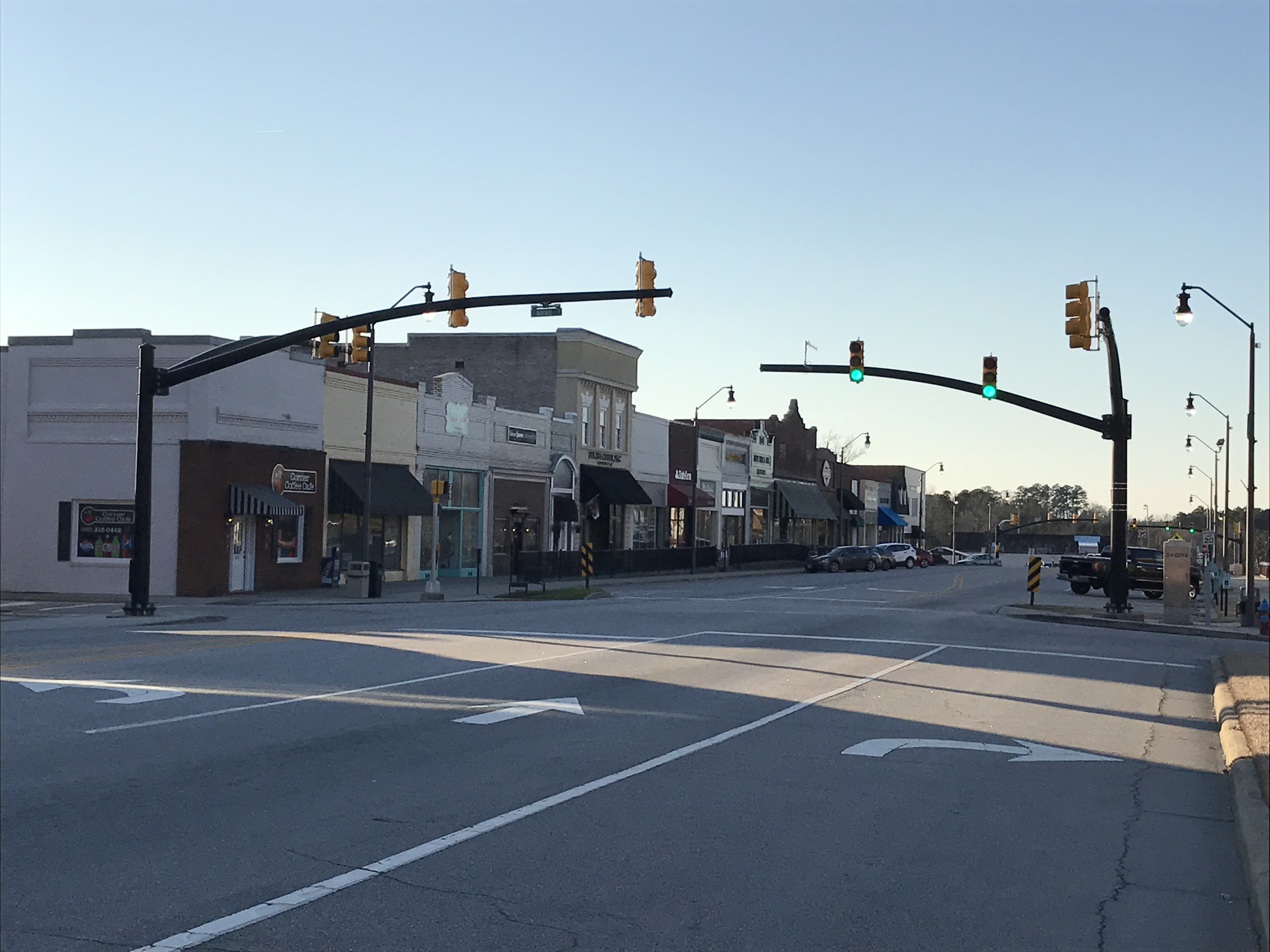
- Washington Street near the Nash County Courthouse

- Location within North Carolina Location within the United States
- Location: Roughly 100–400 W. Washington and 100–300 E. Washington Sts., Nashville, North Carolina
- Coordinates: 35°58′20″N 77°57′54″W
- Area: 60 acres (24 ha)
- Built: 1830
- Architect: John C. Stout; et al.
- Architectural style: Late 19th- and 20th-century revivals, Queen Anne, L-plan
- NRHP reference No.: 87001185
- Added to NRHP: July 22, 1987

The Nashville Historic District is a historic district listed on the National Register of Historic Places, located in Nashville, the county seat of Nash County, North Carolina. The district encompasses 142 contributing buildings and 3 contributing structures, the majority of which date from between 1890 and 1930. They represent notable examples of Greek Revival, Italianate, Queen Anne, Colonial Revival, and Classical Revival architecture.

Two properties within the district are separately listed on the National Register: the Bissette-Cooley House and the Nash County Courthouse. Other notable buildings include the Graphic Building (c. 1910), the Baldy Batchelor Livery Stable (c. 1900), Weldon's Department Store (1913), the Ricks-Strickland House (1890s), the Squire Harper House (1868), the Neville-Strickland House (1907), two metal-veneered Lustron houses, Primitive Baptist Church, First Methodist Church (1923), and a former Baptist Church.

The Nashville Historic District was added to the National Register of Historic Places on July 22, 1987.
