= Spring Hope, North Carolina =

- Town
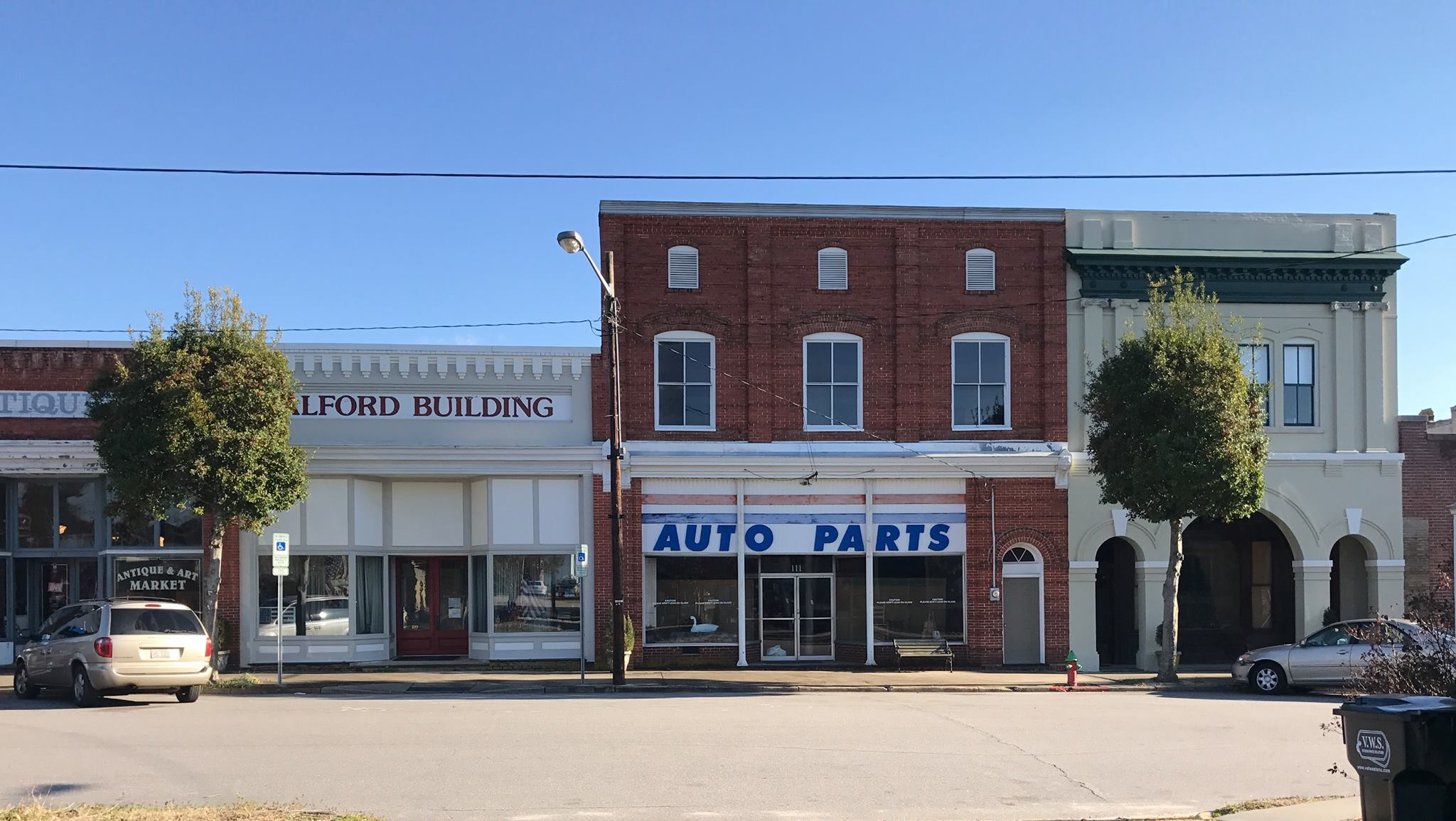
- Commercial buildings in town center

- Location in Nash County and the state of North Carolina.
- Coordinates: 35°56′39″N 78°06′32″W
- Country: United States
- State: North Carolina
- County: Nash

Area
  - Total: 1.51 sq mi (3.92 km^{2})
  - Land: 1.51 sq mi (3.92 km^{2})
  - Water: 0 sq mi (0.00 km^{2})
- Elevation: 259 ft (79 m)

Population (2020)
  - Total: 1,309
  - Density: 865.3/sq mi (334.08/km^{2})
- Time zone: UTC-5 (Eastern (EST))
  - Summer (DST): UTC-4 (EDT)
- ZIP code: 27882
- Area code: 252
- FIPS code: 37-64160
- GNIS feature ID: 2407385
- Website: https://www.springhope.net/

Spring Hope is a town in Nash County, North Carolina, United States. It is part of the Rocky Mount, North Carolina Metropolitan Statistical Area. As of the 2020 census, Spring Hope had a population of 1,309.

== History ==
The Dr. Hassell Brantley House, Spring Hope Historic District, and Valentine-Wilder House are listed on the National Register of Historic Places.

== Geography ==
According to the United States Census Bureau, the town has a total area of 1.4 square miles (3.6 km^{2}), all land.

== Demographics ==
Historical population
Census	Pop.	Note	%±
1890	248		—
1900	666		168.5%
1910	1,246		87.1%
1920	1,221		−2.0%
1930	1,222		0.1%
1940	1,222		0.0%
1950	1,275		4.3%
1960	1,336		4.8%
1970	1,334		−0.1%
1980	1,254		−6.0%
1990	1,221		−2.6%
2000	1,261		3.3%
2010	1,320		4.7%
2020	1,309		−0.8%
U.S. Decennial Census

As of the census of 2000, there were 1,261 people, 544 households, and 338 families residing in the town. The population density was 902.3 inhabitants per square mile (348.4/km^{2}). There were 595 housing units at an average density of 425.7 per square mile (164.4/km^{2}). The racial makeup of the town was 50.75% White, 42.82% African American, 0.63% Native American, 0.16% Asian, 5.39% from other races, and 0.24% from two or more races. Hispanic or Latino of any race were 7.30% of the population.

There were 544 households, out of which 24.6% had children under the age of 18 living with them, 43.9% were married couples living together, 14.9% had a female householder with no husband present, and 37.7% were non-families. 34.6% of all households were made up of individuals, and 18.2% had someone living alone who was 65 years of age or older. The average household size was 2.32 and the average family size was 2.96.

In the town, the population was spread out, with 22.6% under the age of 18, 8.1% from 18 to 24, 28.1% from 25 to 44, 21.3% from 45 to 64, and 20.0% who were 65 years of age or older. The median age was 39 years. For every 100 females, there were 81.7 males. For every 100 females age 18 and over, there were 78.1 males.

The median income for a household in the town was $30,469, and the median income for a family was $36,953. Males had a median income of $28,611 versus $22,981 for females. The per capita income for the town was $15,352. About 13.1% of families and 18.6% of the population were below the poverty line, including 26.7% of those under age 18 and 18.4% of those age 65 or over.

== Notable people ==
- Ray Murray, professional baseball player
- Jerry Richardson, NFL player; founder and former owner of the Carolina Panthers
