= Spring Hope Historic District =

Historic district in North Carolina, United States

- U.S. National Register of Historic Places
- U.S. Historic district
- Location within North Carolina Location within the United States
- Location: Roughly bounded by Franklin, Louisburg, Second and Community Sts., Spring Hope, North Carolina
- Coordinates: 35°56′37″N 78°06′36″W
- Area: 65 acres (26 ha)
- Built: 1888
- Architect: Stout, John C.; Et al.
- Architectural style: Bungalow/craftsman, Late Victorian, Triple-A cottage
- NRHP reference No.: 88001591
- Added to NRHP: September 15, 1988

Spring Hope Historic District is a national historic district located at Spring Hope, Nash County, North Carolina. It encompasses 159 contributing buildings and 1 contributing structure in the small railroad town of Spring Hope. The buildings primarily date to the 19th and early 20th century, and include notable examples of Late Victorian and Bungalow / American Craftsman style architecture. Located in the district is the separately listed Dr. Hassell Brantley House. Other notable buildings include former Wilmington and Weldon railroad station, Bluford-Brantley House, Sykes Seed Store, Spivey's General Merchandise, Citizens Bank (1908), A. F. May gasoline station (1923), Hill's Auto Service (1933-1934), Spring Hope Cotton Seed Oil Company, Joseph J. Spivey House, Cone-Brantley House (1887), Richardson-Chamblee House (1901), and Morgan-Vester House (1923).

It was listed on the National Register of Historic Places in 1988.
