= Dr. Hassell Brantley House =

Historic house in North Carolina, United States

- U.S. National Register of Historic Places
- U.S. Historic district – Contributing property
- Location within North Carolina Location within the United States
- Location: 301 Branch St., Spring Hope, North Carolina
- Coordinates: 35°56′45″N 78°6′30″W
- Area: 1 acre (0.40 ha)
- Built: 1912
- Architect: Stout, J.C.
- Architectural style: Classical Revival
- NRHP reference No.: 86001647
- Added to NRHP: August 14, 1986

Dr. Hassell Brantley House is a historic home located at Spring Hope, Nash County, North Carolina. It was built in 1912, and consists of a two-story, five-bay, central block with two-story gable roofed wings. A has a one-story rear kitchen wing with a hip roof. The front facade features full-height, Classical Revival pedimented portico, with Ionic order columns and a wrap-around porch.

It was listed on the National Register of Historic Places in 1986. It is located in the Spring Hope Historic District.
