= Red Oak, North Carolina =

- Town
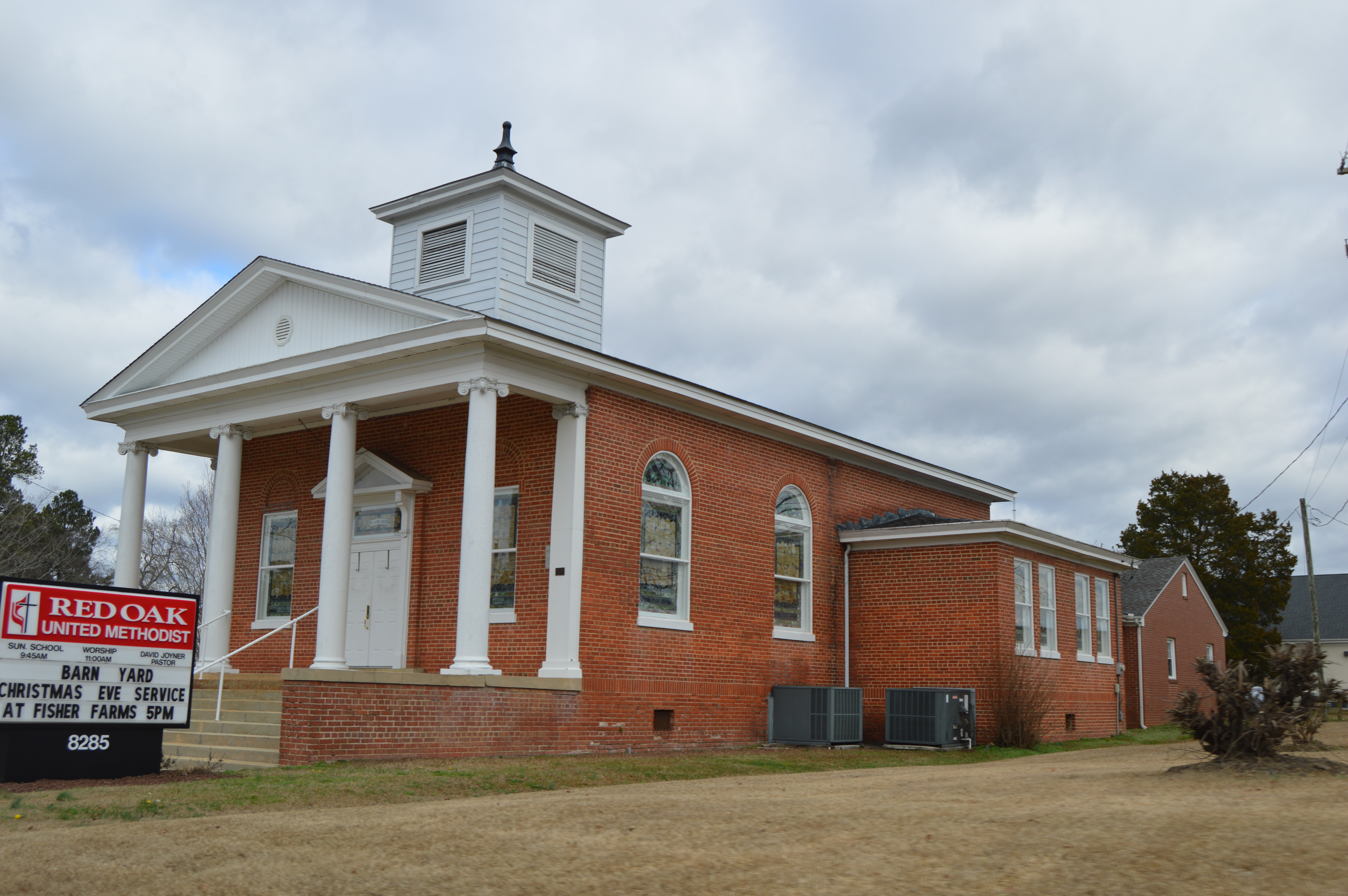
- Methodist church

- Location in Nash County and the state of North Carolina.
- Coordinates: 36°1′53″N 77°54′6″W
- Country: United States
- State: North Carolina
- County: Nash

Area
  - Total: 19.54 sq mi (50.61 km^{2})
  - Land: 19.53 sq mi (50.58 km^{2})
  - Water: 0.0077 sq mi (0.02 km^{2})
- Elevation: 203 ft (62 m)

Population (2020)
  - Total: 3,342
  - Density: 171.1/sq mi (66.07/km^{2})
- Time zone: UTC-5 (Eastern (EST))
  - Summer (DST): UTC-4 (EDT)
- ZIP code: 27868
- Area code: 252
- FIPS code: 37-55640
- GNIS feature ID: 1022197
- Website: https://www.townofredoaknc.com/

Red Oak is a town in Nash County, North Carolina, United States. It is part of the Rocky Mount, North Carolina Metropolitan Statistical Area. As of the 2020 census, Red Oak had a population of 3,342.

== History ==
Black Jack and the Red Oak Community House are listed on the National Register of Historic Places.

== Geography ==
According to the United States Census Bureau, the town has a total area of 19.5 square miles (51 km^{2}), of which 19.5 square miles (51 km^{2}) is land and 0.05% is water.

== Demographics ==
Historical population
Census	Pop.	Note	%±
1970	359		—
1980	314		−12.5%
1990	280		−10.8%
2000	2,723		872.5%
2010	3,430		26.0%
2020	3,342		−2.6%
U.S. Decennial Census

=== 2020 census ===
As of the 2020 census, Red Oak had a population of 3,342. The median age was 47.4 years. 20.4% of residents were under the age of 18 and 22.1% of residents were 65 years of age or older. For every 100 females there were 97.3 males, and for every 100 females age 18 and over there were 95.8 males age 18 and over.

5.6% of residents lived in urban areas, while 94.4% lived in rural areas.

There were 1,316 households in Red Oak, including 1,133 families, of which 31.3% had children under the age of 18 living in them. Of all households, 63.6% were married-couple households, 13.0% were households with a male householder and no spouse or partner present, and 18.5% were households with a female householder and no spouse or partner present. About 18.9% of all households were made up of individuals and 9.2% had someone living alone who was 65 years of age or older.

There were 1,373 housing units, of which 4.2% were vacant. The homeowner vacancy rate was 0.4% and the rental vacancy rate was 2.0%.

Racial composition as of the 2020 census
Race	Number	Percent
White	2,736	81.9%
Black or African American	423	12.7%
American Indian and Alaska Native	26	0.8%
Asian	11	0.3%
Native Hawaiian and Other Pacific Islander	0	0.0%
Some other race	40	1.2%
Two or more races	106	3.2%
Hispanic or Latino (of any race)	79	2.4%

=== 2000 census ===
As of the census of 2000, there were 2,723 people, 984 households, and 821 families residing in the town. The population density was 139.7 inhabitants per square mile (53.9/km^{2}). There were 1,030 housing units at an average density of 52.8 per square mile (20.4/km^{2}). The racial makeup of the town was 90.67% White, 8.04% African American, 0.07% Native American, 0.26% Asian, 0.33% from other races, and 0.62% from two or more races. Hispanic or Latino of any race were 1.32% of the population.

There were 984 households, out of which 38.3% had children under the age of 18 living with them, 74.0% were married couples living together, 6.6% had a female householder with no husband present, and 16.5% were non-families. 14.6% of all households were made up of individuals, and 6.5% had someone living alone who was 65 years of age or older. The average household size was 2.77 and the average family size was 3.06.

In the town, the population was spread out, with 26.1% under the age of 18, 6.2% from 18 to 24, 28.8% from 25 to 44, 28.7% from 45 to 64, and 10.2% who were 65 years of age or older. The median age was 39 years. For every 100 females, there were 98.3 males. For every 100 females age 18 and over, there were 94.3 males.

The median income for a household in the town was $54,958, and the median income for a family was $61,406. Males had a median income of $40,718 versus $26,091 for females. The per capita income for the town was $22,616. About 5.7% of families and 6.7% of the population were below the poverty line, including 4.9% of those under age 18 and 16.6% of those age 65 or over.
