= Valentine-Wilder House =

Historic house in North Carolina, United States

- U.S. National Register of Historic Places
- Location within North Carolina Location within the United States
- Location: 8194 Webb's Mill Rd., near Spring Hope, North Carolina
- Coordinates: 35°56′20″N 78°7′56″W
- Area: 5.64 acres (2.28 ha)
- Built: c. 1925
- Architect: Stout, J.C.
- Architectural style: Rustic Revival
- NRHP reference No.: 13001028
- Added to NRHP: December 31, 2013

Valentine-Wilder House is a historic home located at Spring Hope, Nash County, North Carolina. It was built about 1925, and is a 1 1/2-story, side gabled, Arts and Crafts-influenced, Rustic Revival style log dwelling. It sits on stone piers and has three large exterior gable end stone chimneys. Also on the property is a contributing log smokehouse / office (c. 1925).

It was listed on the National Register of Historic Places in 2013.
