= Machaven =

Historic house in North Carolina, United States

- U.S. National Register of Historic Places
- U.S. Historic district – Contributing property
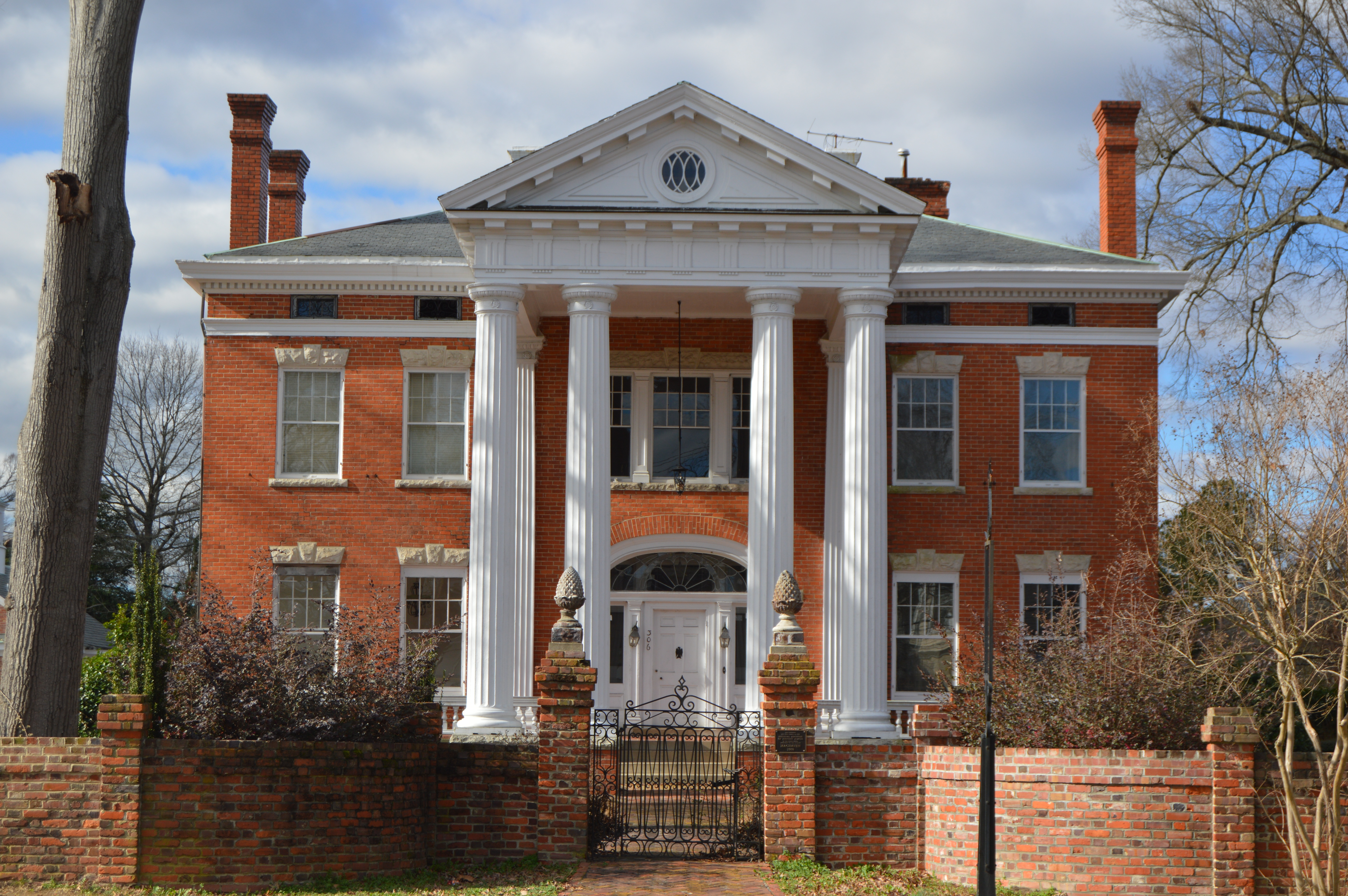
- Front of the house

- Location within North Carolina Location within the United States
- Location: 306 S. Grace St., Rocky Mount, North Carolina
- Coordinates: 35°56′26″N 77°48′11″W
- Area: 0.5 acres (0.20 ha)
- Built: 1907
- Architect: Harry P.S. Keller
- Architectural style: Colonial Revival, Classical Revival
- NRHP reference No.: 80002890
- Added to NRHP: November 25, 1980

Machaven, also known as Hines House, is a historic home located at Rocky Mount, Nash County, North Carolina. It was built in 1907–1908, and is a 2 1/2-story, Classical Revival style brick dwelling with slate covered hipped roof. It has five interior chimneys, a pedimented portico with Doric order columns, and a full-width one-story porch. The interior finish is of the Colonial Revival style.

It was listed on the National Register of Historic Places in 1980. It is located in the Villa Place Historic District.
