= Black Jack (Red Oak, North Carolina) =

Historic house in North Carolina, United States

- U.S. National Register of Historic Places
- Location within North Carolina Location within the United States
- Location: N of Red Oak, near Red Oak, North Carolina
- Coordinates: 36°5′43″N 77°52′31″W
- Area: 3 acres (1.2 ha)
- Built: c. 1800
- Architectural style: Georgian, Federal
- NRHP reference No.: 74001362
- Added to NRHP: July 31, 1974

Black Jack, also known as John Hilliard House, is a historic plantation house located near Red Oak, Nash County, North Carolina. It was built about 1800, and is a two-story, three bay by two bay, Late Georgian / Federal style frame dwelling with one-story rear additions. It was listed on the National Register of Historic Places in 1974.

The residence was sheathed in weatherboard and has a gable roof. It features double-shoulder, brick exterior end chimneys.
