= Nash County Courthouse =

- U.S. National Register of Historic Places
- U.S. Historic district – Contributing property
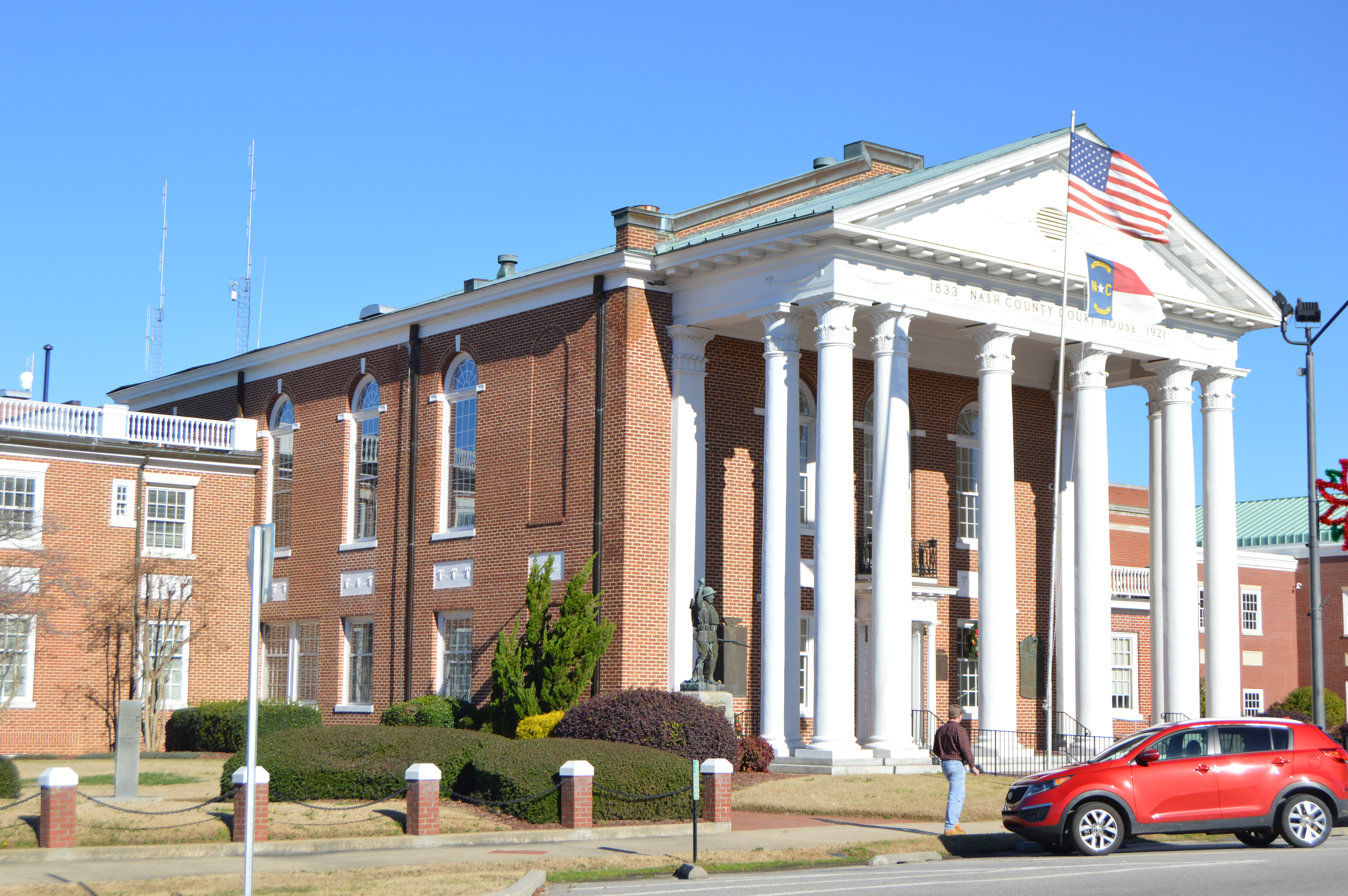
- Facade and western side

- Location within North Carolina Location within the United States
- Location: Washington St. between Drake and N. Court Sts., Nashville, North Carolina
- Coordinates: 35°58′34″N 77°58′4″W
- Area: 2.7 acres (1.1 ha)
- Built: 1921
- Architect: J.C. Stout
- Architectural style: Colonial Revival
- MPS: North Carolina County Courthouses TR
- NRHP reference No.: 79001739
- Added to NRHP: May 10, 1979

Nash County Courthouse is a historic courthouse located at Nashville, Nash County, North Carolina. It was built in 1921, and is a two-story, rectangular, brick building in the Colonial Revival style. It has a T-shaped in plan, with the temple-form main block flanked by small brick wings. The interior was remodeled in 1974. An expansion to the courthouse was started in 2017 and finished in 2018.

It was added to the National Register of Historic Places in 1979. It is located in the Nashville Historic District.
