= Taylor's Mill =

- U.S. National Register of Historic Places
- Location within North Carolina Location within the United States
- Nearest city: SR 1120 W of SR 1124, near Middlesex, North Carolina
- Coordinates: 35°46′38″N 78°14′24″W
- Area: 100 acres (40 ha)
- Built: c. 1850
- NRHP reference No.: 80002889
- Added to NRHP: May 28, 1980

Taylor's Mill is a historic grist mill located near Middlesex, Nash County, North Carolina. The mill was built about 1850, and is a two-story, gable roofed frame building on a stone pier foundation. The mill measures approximately 30 feet (9.1 m) wide by 40 feet (12 m) long.

It was listed on the National Register of Historic Places in 1980.
