= Stonewall (Rocky Mount, North Carolina) =

Historic house in North Carolina, United States

- U.S. National Register of Historic Places
- Location within North Carolina Location within the United States
- Location: Falls Rd. extension, near Rocky Mount, North Carolina
- Coordinates: 35°57′26″N 77°48′29″W
- Area: 6.5 acres (2.6 ha)
- Built: 1830
- Architectural style: Federal
- NRHP reference No.: 70000463
- Added to NRHP: June 2, 1970

Stonewall, also known as Lewis House and Little Falls Plantation, is a historic plantation house located near Rocky Mount, Nash County, North Carolina. It was built about 1830, and is a two-story, five-bay, Federal style brick dwelling. It sits on a raised basement and has a high hipped roof. The front facade features a pedimented Ionic order portico added in 1915.

It was listed on the National Register of Historic Places in 1970.
