= Red Oak Community House =

- U.S. National Register of Historic Places
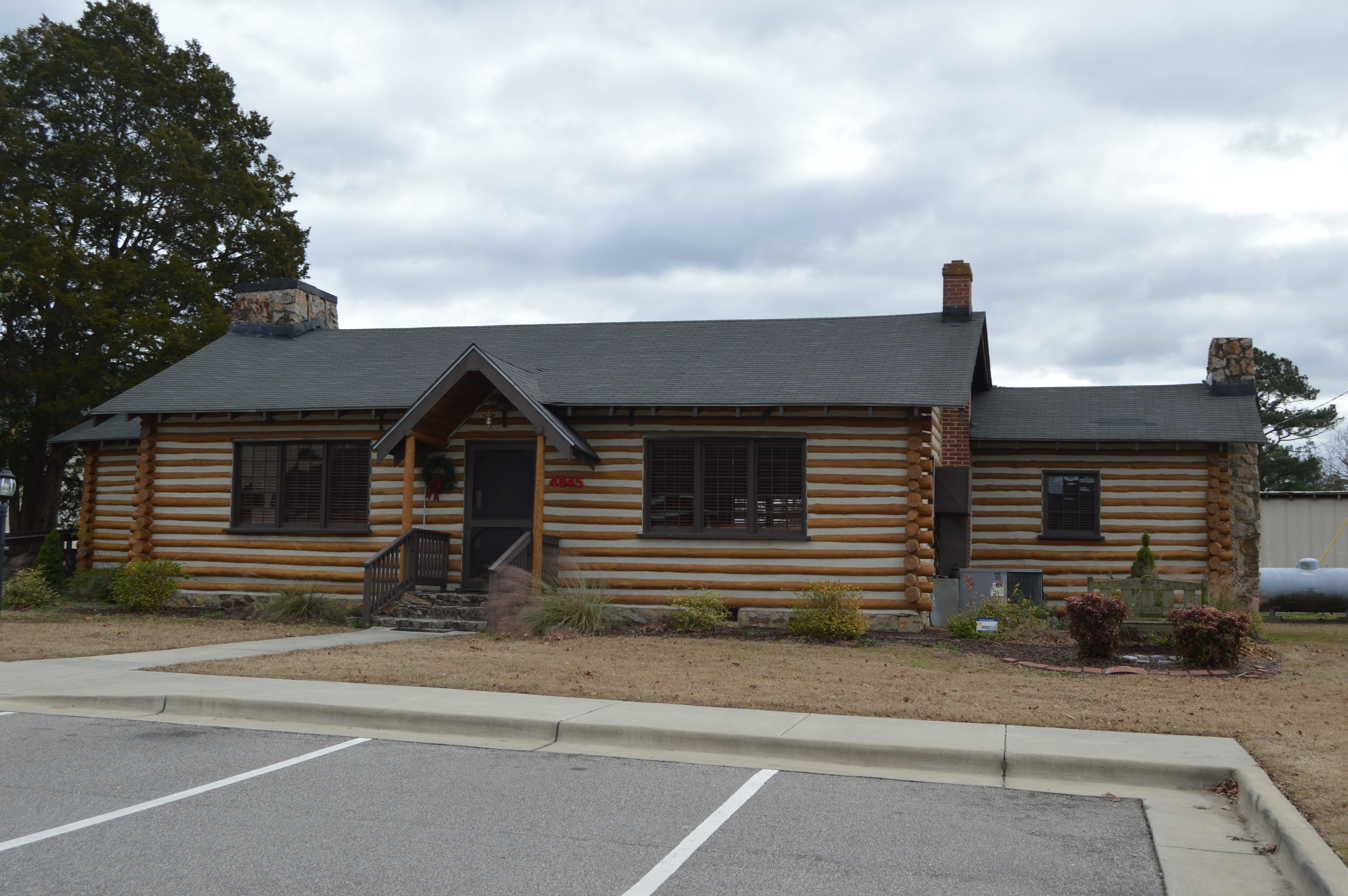
- Facade

- Location within North Carolina Location within the United States
- Location: E. Side, Church St., approx. 0.1 N of jct. with NC 43, Red Oak, North Carolina
- Coordinates: 36°2′16″N 77°54′19″W
- Area: 1.1 acres (0.45 ha)
- Built: 1935
- Architectural style: Rustic Revival
- NRHP reference No.: 06000293
- Added to NRHP: April 19, 2006

Red Oak Community House, also known as Red Oak Community Building, is a historic clubhouse located at Red Oak, Nash County, North Carolina. It was built in 1935, and is a one-story, side-gable, Rustic Revival style log building. It was listed on the National Register of Historic Places in 2006.

The building consists of a main block and wing, and features two large stone chimneys. It was built under the direction of the Emergency Relief Administration (ERA) to serve as the home of the Red Oak Home Demonstration Club.
