= Falls Road Historic District =

Historic district in North Carolina, United States

- U.S. National Register of Historic Places
- U.S. Historic district
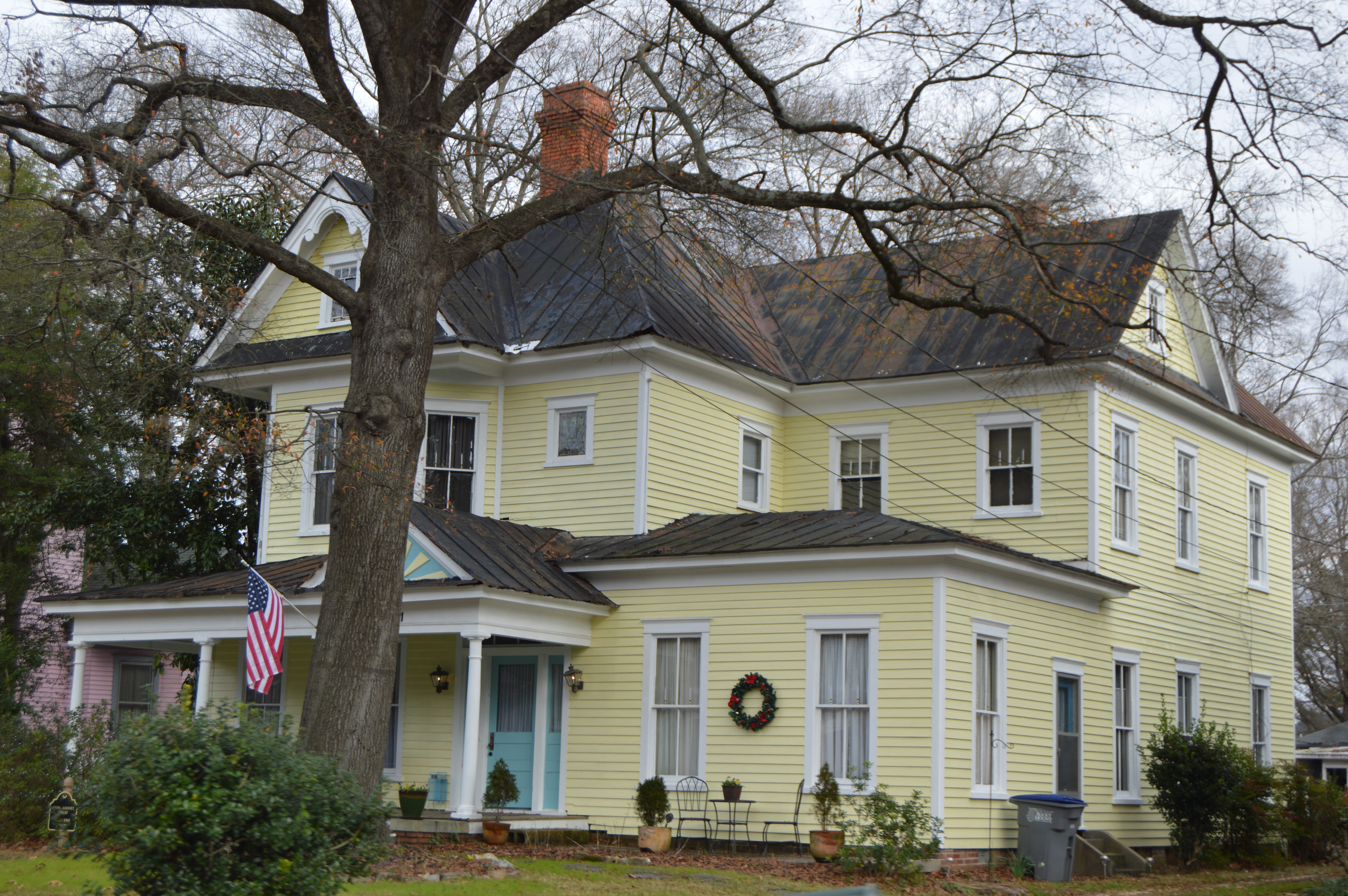
- House at 521 Falls

- Location within North Carolina Location within the United States
- Location: 500-600 Avent St., 100-200 Braswell St., 100 Earl St., 400-700 Falls Rd., 500 Peachtree St. and 100 Wilkinson St., Rocky Mount, North Carolina
- Coordinates: 35°57′03″N 77°47′52″W
- Area: 24 acres (9.7 ha)
- Built: 1923
- Architect: John C. Stout
- Architectural style: Queen Anne, Classical Revival, Colonial Revival
- NRHP reference No.: 99001367
- Added to NRHP: November 12, 1999

Falls Road Historic District is a national historic district located at Rocky Mount, Nash County, North Carolina. It encompasses 75 contributing buildings and 1 contributing structure in a residential section of Rocky Mount. The buildings primarily date between about 1900 and 1950, and include notable examples of Queen Anne, Colonial Revival, and Classical Revival style residential architecture. Notable buildings include the Lyon-Looney House (c. 1908), T.B. Bunn House (c. 1905), Thorpe-Gay House (early 1900s), William E. Fenner House (c. 1914), Whitehead House (1923), R. H. Gregory House (1950), and the Wilkinson School (1923).

It was listed on the National Register of Historic Places in 1999.
