= Dortch House =

Historic house in North Carolina, United States

- U.S. National Register of Historic Places
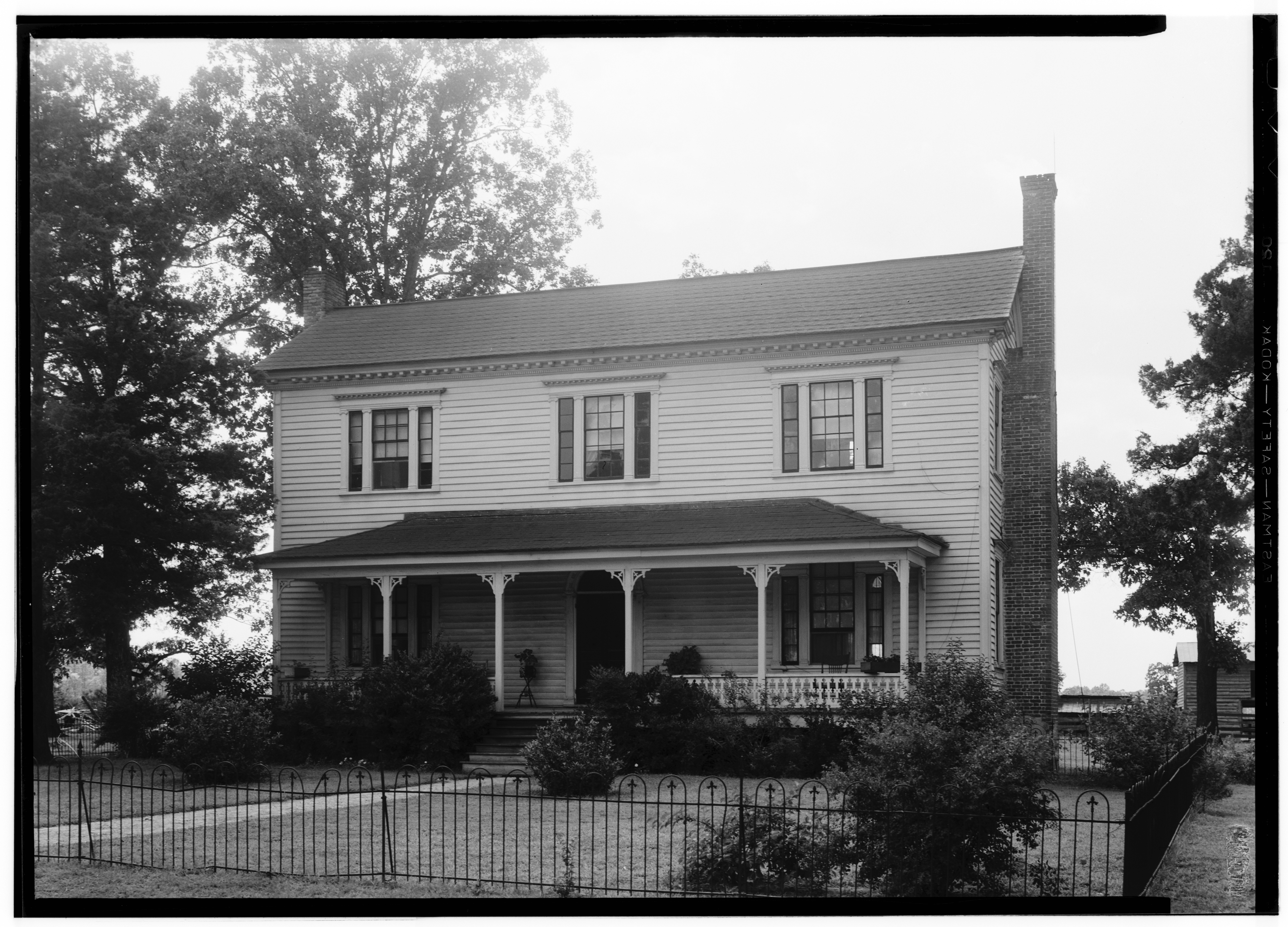
- Dortch House, HABS Photo, July 1940

- Location within North Carolina Location within the United States
- Location: SR 1544 off NC 43, Dortches, North Carolina
- Coordinates: 36°0′35″N 77°51′36″W
- Area: 8 acres (3.2 ha)
- Built: c. 1800
- Architectural style: Federal
- NRHP reference No.: 72000979
- Added to NRHP: December 26, 1972

Dortch House is a historic home located in Dortches, North Carolina, Nash County, North Carolina. It was built about 1803, by William Dortch, and is a Federal-style frame dwelling that consists of a two-story, three-bay, main block covered by a gable roof and a one-story rear wing. It is sheathed in weatherboard and features a one-story full-width front porch and Palladian windows. The house was purchased by Henry Griffin in 1899 from the Dortch family and remained in the Griffin family until 2020. The one-story full-width front porch was added by the Griffin family sometimes before the 1910s. A one-bay portico with columns was the original porch to the house.

The back section of the house was a free standing federal farm house that was close by the house. It was built around 1779. There was a log kitchen out back of the Dortch House which burned down (date?). At that time, the federal farm house was moved up to the Dortch house and connected. Sometimes in 1942, the family who owned the home remodeled the entire back section of the house using a mix of new and old timber. In keeping with the exterior of the front house, the weatherboard around the back section of the house was specially milled to match the front of the house. There is deterioration on the outside of the house and some less inside.

The house sits on the Halifax Road and the old Red Oak Road. The Old Halifax Road was an old Stagecoach road that ran from near Elm City, NC and Halifax, NC. Halifax, NC is a Historical Site which is a State Park. The Halifax Stagecoach Road was a major road through the area. Halifax, NC was a political site where people met, including George Washington, to hammer out parts of the Constitution.

The Dortch House, one of the finest Federal farmhouses in the state according to Thomas T. Waterman. The house has been vacant for several years now, in disrepair. The house was purchased by an individual in 2020 and is undergoing rehabbing.

It was listed on the National Register of Historic Places in 1972.
