= Rocky Mount Electric Power Plant =

- U.S. National Register of Historic Places
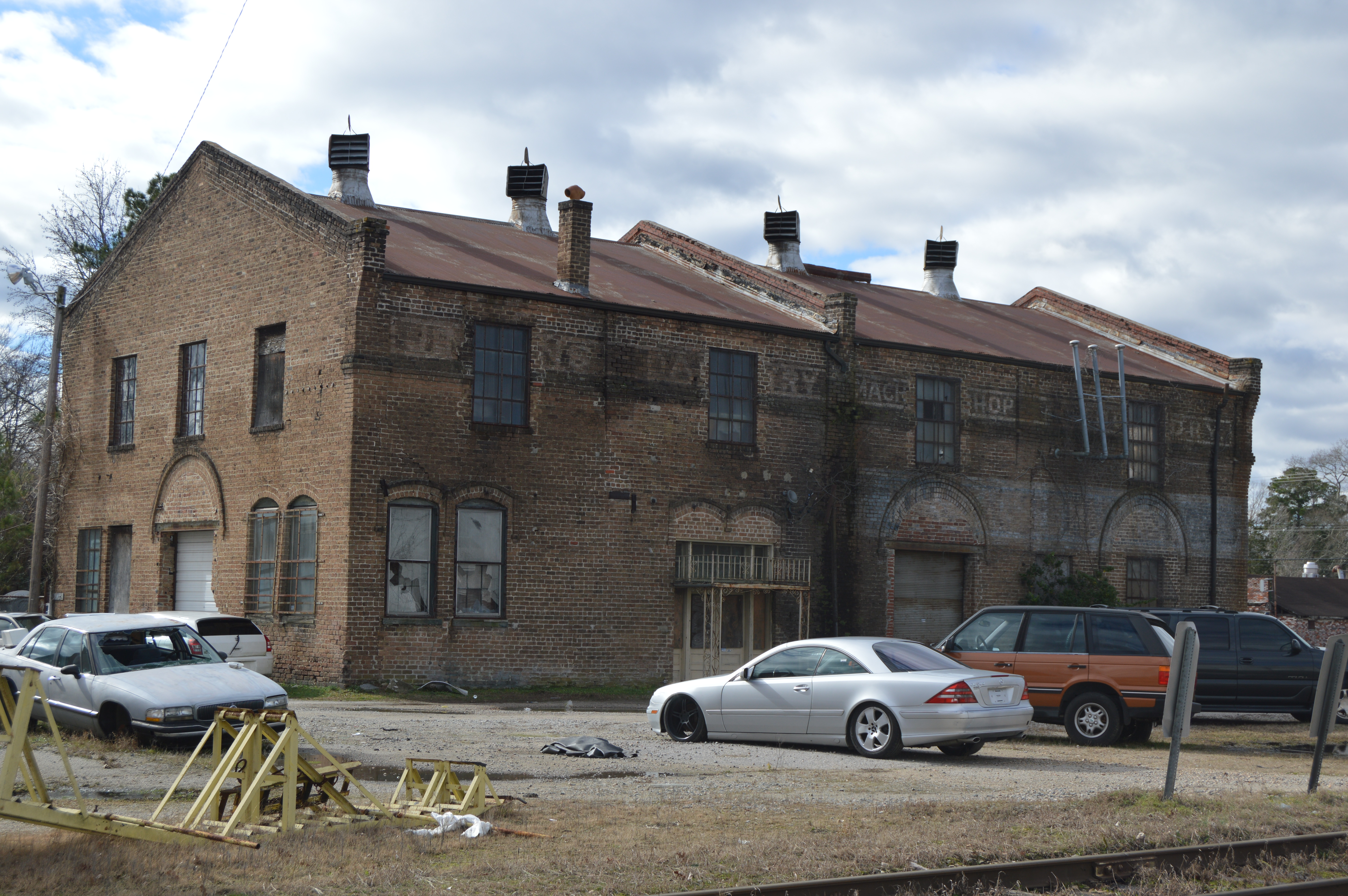
- Front and eastern side

- Location within North Carolina Location within the United States
- Location: 217 Andrews St., Rocky Mount, North Carolina
- Coordinates: 35°56′11″N 77°48′2″W
- Area: 2 acres (0.81 ha)
- Built: 1901, 1920
- NRHP reference No.: 82003494
- Added to NRHP: July 15, 1982

Rocky Mount Electric Power Plant, also known as Pearsall Machine Works, Inc., is a historic power station located at Rocky Mount, Nash County, North Carolina. It was built in 1901 as a one-story brick facility and raised to its present height of two stories, and a rear addition was made as well, in 1920. It has a corrugated metal gable roof with parapet gable ends. The building housed a power plant until 1910.

It was listed on the National Register of Historic Places in 1982.
