= Nashville, North Carolina =

- Town
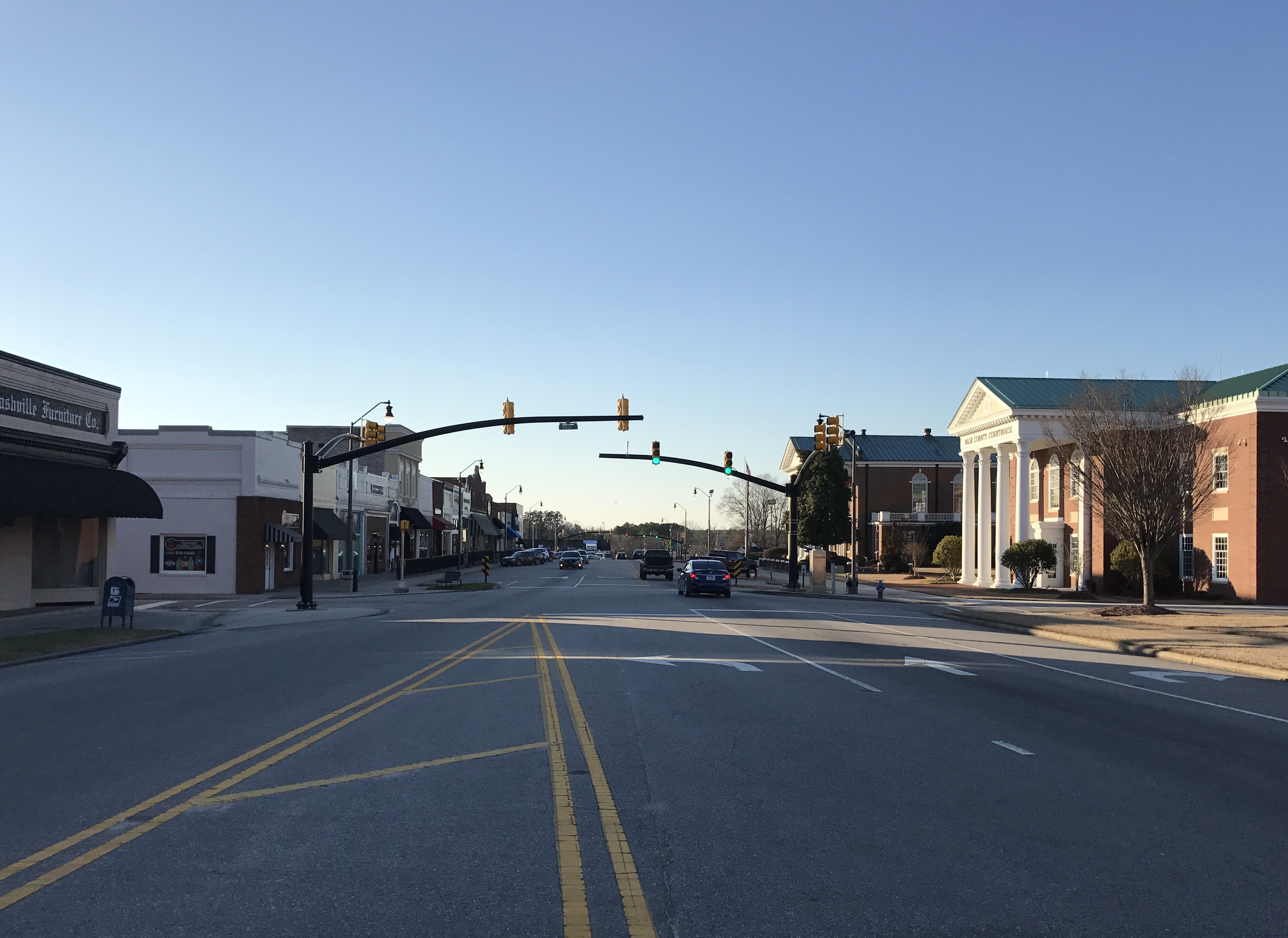
- Washington Street downtown

- Seal
- Motto: "The Original Town of Nashville"
- Location in Nash County and the state of North Carolina
- Coordinates: 35°58′09″N 77°57′20″W
- Country: United States
- State: North Carolina
- County: Nash
- Named for: Francis Nash

Area
  - Total: 4.70 sq mi (12.17 km^{2})
  - Land: 4.70 sq mi (12.16 km^{2})
  - Water: 0.0039 sq mi (0.01 km^{2})
- Elevation: 167 ft (51 m)

Population (2020)
  - Total: 5,632
  - Density: 1,199.5/sq mi (463.12/km^{2})
- Time zone: UTC-5 (Eastern (EST))
  - Summer (DST): UTC-4 (EDT)
- ZIP code: 27856
- Area code: 252
- FIPS code: 37-46000
- GNIS feature ID: 2406965
- Website: www.townofnashville.com

Nashville is a town in and the county seat of Nash County, North Carolina, United States. The town was founded in 1780 and features Victorian and Queen Anne–style homes. It is part of the Rocky Mount metropolitan area. The population of Nashville was 5,632 in 2020.

== History ==
The town was founded in 1780, and is named for Francis Nash, an officer of the North Carolina militia who died in the American Revolutionary War.

Morning Star Institute was in Nashville in 1856.

== Geography ==
According to the United States Census Bureau, the town has a total area of 3.0 square miles (7.8 km^{2}), all of it land.

== Demographics ==
Historical population
Census	Pop.	Note	%±
1880	212		—
1890	401		89.2%
1900	479		19.5%
1910	750		56.6%
1920	939		25.2%
1930	1,137		21.1%
1940	1,171		3.0%
1950	1,302		11.2%
1960	1,423		9.3%
1970	1,670		17.4%
1980	3,033		81.6%
1990	3,617		19.3%
2000	4,309		19.1%
2010	5,352		24.2%
2020	5,632		5.2%
U.S. Decennial Census

=== 2020 census ===
As of the 2020 census, there were 5,632 people and 1,423 families residing in the town.

The median age was 42.0 years. 21.7% of residents were under the age of 18 and 20.2% of residents were 65 years of age or older. For every 100 females there were 83.2 males, and for every 100 females age 18 and over there were 79.2 males age 18 and over.

98.7% of residents lived in urban areas, while 1.3% lived in rural areas.

There were 2,386 households in Nashville, of which 31.0% had children under the age of 18 living in them. Of all households, 38.0% were married-couple households, 15.5% were households with a male householder and no spouse or partner present, and 41.8% were households with a female householder and no spouse or partner present. About 31.8% of all households were made up of individuals and 14.0% had someone living alone who was 65 years of age or older.

There were 2,625 housing units, of which 9.1% were vacant. The homeowner vacancy rate was 1.0% and the rental vacancy rate was 3.6%.

Nashville racial composition
Race	Number	Percentage
White (non-Hispanic)	2,498	44.35%
Black or African American (non-Hispanic)	2,707	48.06%
Native American	42	0.75%
Asian	28	0.5%
Pacific Islander	4	0.07%
Other/Mixed	204	3.62%
Hispanic or Latino	149	2.65%

=== 2000 census ===
As of the census of 2000, there were 4,309 people, 1,629 households, and 1,124 families residing in the town. The population density was 1,425.2 people per square mile (550.3 people/km^{2}). There were 1,751 housing units at an average density of 579.1 per square mile (223.6/km^{2}). The racial makeup of the town was 54.82% White, 43.10% African American, 0.30% Native American, 0.58% Asian, 0.60% from other races, and 0.60% from two or more races. Hispanic or Latino of any race were 1.25% of the population.

There were 1,629 households, out of which 32.5% had children under the age of 18 living with them, 48.4% were married couples living together, 16.7% had a female householder with no husband present, and 31.0% were non-families. 28.4% of all households were made up of individuals, and 11.8% had someone living alone who was 65 years of age or older. The average household size was 2.43 and the average family size was 2.98.

In the town, the population was spread out, with 23.7% under the age of 18, 7.1% from 18 to 24, 30.4% from 25 to 44, 22.5% from 45 to 64, and 16.3% who were 65 years of age or older. The median age was 38 years. For every 100 females, there were 89.2 males. For every 100 females age 18 and over, there were 84.4 males.

The median income for a household in the town was $36,371, and the median income for a family was $44,180. Males had a median income of $32,282 versus $22,176 for females. The per capita income for the town was $18,603. About 9.5% of families and 10.5% of the population were below the poverty line, including 10.0% of those under age 18 and 15.6% of those age 65 or over.

== Arts and culture ==
The Nashville Blooming Festival was founded in 1997, and features food, music, vendors, a parade, and a carnival.

The Bissette-Cooley House, Nash County Courthouse, Nashville Historic District, and Rose Hill are listed on the National Register of Historic Places.

== Notable people ==
- Archibald Hunter Arrington, United States Congressman from North Carolina; born near Nashville
- J. J. Arrington, former NFL running back; born in Nashville
- Harold D. Cooley, United States Congressman from North Carolina; born in Nashville. Cooley is the longest-serving Chairman of the House Committee on Agriculture in history.
- Pell Cooper, North Carolina District Court judge; born in Nashville
- Roy Asberry Cooper Jr., lawyer and Democratic strategist
- Roy Cooper, Governor of North Carolina; born in Nashville
- Algenon L. Marbley, Federal District Court Judge Southern District of Ohio; raised partly in Nashville
- Phil Valentine (1959–2021), nationally syndicated talk radio host and movie producer; raised in Nashville
- Tim Valentine (1926–2015), United States Congressman from North Carolina; lived and practiced law in Nashville. Father of Phil Valentine.
