= Jack Finch (conservationist) =

American conservationist (1917-2009)

Jack Rodney Finch
- Born: November 5, 1917
- Died: November 9, 2006 (aged 89)
- Occupation: Farmer
- Known for: Bluebird conservation
- Spouse: Ruby

Jack Rodney Finch (November 5, 1917 – November 9, 2006) was an American conservationist known primarily for his efforts to save the eastern bluebird. He was known as The Birdman of Bailey.

== Saving the eastern bluebird ==
Finch recognized that when tobacco curing barns switched from wood to gas or oil fired heaters in the 1940s, bluebirds were attracted to the metal vent pipes with rain caps as potential nesting sites. Millions of bluebirds became trapped in the pipes and the combustion chambers to starve. As many as 20 dead bluebirds were found when the burners were cleaned. The eastern bluebird was virtually extirpated from tobacco producing areas in the 1950s.

Finch was nationally recognized for alerting the public and working to get simple wire guards put around the openings. Finch also advised others on ways to prevent unnecessary deaths of bluebirds because of modern practices such as protective tubes placed around young trees that became unintended bird traps.

Described as a "pragmatic naturalist," Finch built a number of different birdhouses of different designs, then observed which were chosen by the bluebirds. He conducted tests and experiments on ways to protect bluebird nest boxes from snakes and other predators. He constructed a snake pit filled with black rat snakes to support his experiments and test predator guards. Results of those tests are referenced in a number of books on bluebirds.

== Homes for bluebirds ==
While working with his teenage son in December 1971, Finch heard the distinctive sound of a bluebird. Finch immediately stopped his work and built seven bluebird houses that day. Two days later, he saw bluebirds in his yard for the first time in 36 years.

With the help of the local Ruritan club, Finch founded the nonprofit Homes for Bluebirds, Inc. in 1973. That organization built and distributed over 60,000 bluebird boxes by the mid-1990s and continues to sell them at cost.

== Recognition and legacy ==
In 1990, Finch's efforts to save bluebirds was featured on the CBS Evening News with Dan Rather as part of the celebration of the 20th anniversary of Earth Day. Correspondent Bob McNamara remembers that story as one of his favorites. After the story aired, "the New York phone lines were flooded with inquiries about how to get the birdhouses".

A roadside sign was funded and erected by the North Carolina Bluebird Society in honor of Jack Finch. It was dedicated on October 24, 2009.
