= Battleboro, North Carolina =

Neighborhood in Rocky Mount, North Carolina, United States

Battleboro
- Neighborhood
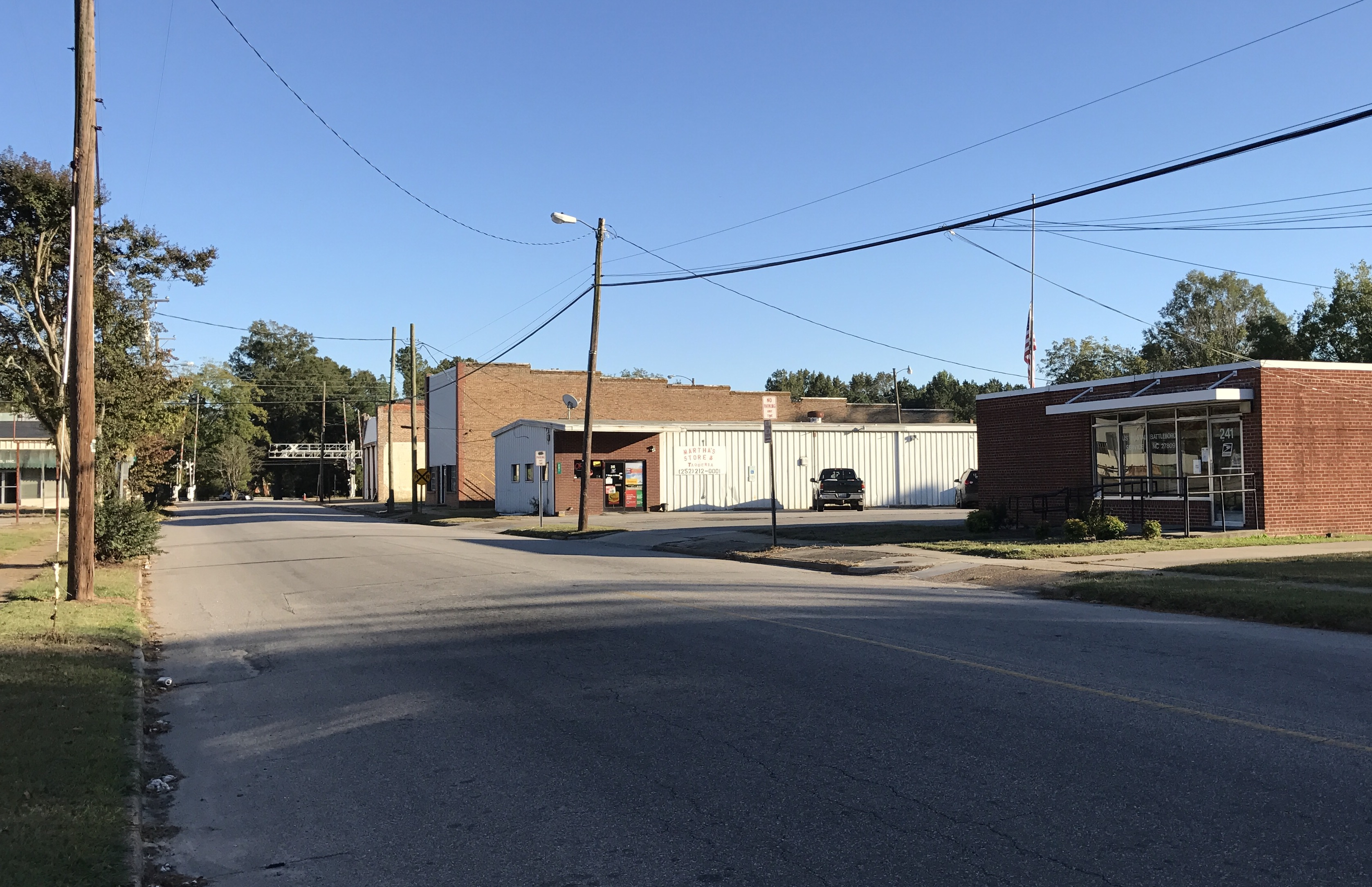
- Community of Battleboro

- Location within North Carolina
- Coordinates: 36°02′56″N 77°44′56″W
- Country: United States
- State: North Carolina
- Counties: Edgecombe, Nash
- City: Rocky Mount
- Founded: 1835
- Incorporated: 1873
- Annexed: June 30, 1996
- Named for: James and Joseph Battle
- Elevation: 128 ft (39 m)
- Time zone: UTC-5 (Eastern (EST))
  - Summer (DST): UTC-4 (EDT)
- ZIP code: 27809
- Area code: 252
- GNIS feature ID: 980632

Battleboro is a neighborhood of the city of Rocky Mount in Edgecombe and Nash counties of North Carolina, United States.

== History ==
In 1835 Joseph S. Battle established Battle's Camp along the Wilmington and Raleigh Railroad. The settlement was initially located entirely in Edgecombe County, North Carolina, but in 1871 the county line was altered to run along the railroad and Battle's Camp straddled both Edgecombe and Nash counties. In 1873 the community was incorporated as the town of Battleboro. By 1900 the town had 229 residents. Around that time the community had a strong economy and hosted an oil mill, sawmill, gristmill, ice plant, music shop, and barbershop. Two years later the business district was destroyed in a fire, but it was later rebuilt. By 1990 the town had grown to include 447 residents. In April 1994, a black rights group, Concerned Citizens for Battleboro, initiated a boycott of local white-owned businesses in protest of alleged harassment by authorities after a black woman was maced by a police officer and arrested for intervening in a traffic stop involving her niece. The boycott garnered national media attention and forced the town's largest grocery store to close.

Over the next few years many residents of the Battleboro began urging that the town be annexed by the larger city of Rocky Mount, mostly to receive cheaper government services. The all-white Battleboro Board of Commissioners repeatedly refused to consider the matter, leading racial minorities in the town to accuse the board of discrimination. On June 4, 1996, residents of the community voted in a nonbinding referendum 132–34 in favor of annexation. Following the approval of Rocky Mount's city council, Battleboro, numbering 523 residents, was annexed by Rocky Mount on June 30.

In June 2014, the Italian company Nutkao announced plans to open a facility in the area, with around forty employees.

== Notable people ==
- Clinton Wesley Battle – Politician and postmaster.
- Mae Mercer – Blues singer, actress, and producer.
- Victor Worsley – NFL football player who played for the Indianapolis Colts.

== Sources ==
- Fleming, Monika S. (1998). Rocky Mount and Nash County. Arcadia Publishing. ISBN 9780738553184.
