= Hilliardston, North Carolina =

- Unincorporated community
- Location within North Carolina Location within the United States
- Coordinates: 36°06′20″N 77°55′47″W
- Country: United States
- State: North Carolina
- County: Nash
- Elevation: 200 ft (61 m)
- Time zone: UTC-5 (Eastern (EST))
  - Summer (DST): UTC-4 (EDT)
- Area code: 252
- GNIS feature ID: 1020779

Hilliardston is an unincorporated community in Nash County, North Carolina, United States.
