= National Register of Historic Places listings in Lenoir County, North Carolina =

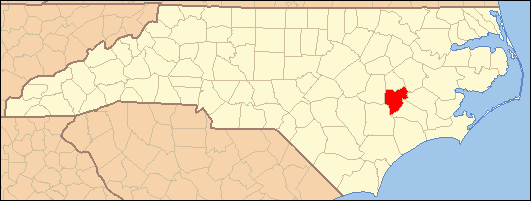

This list includes properties and districts listed on the National Register of Historic Places in Lenoir County, North Carolina. Click the "Map of all coordinates" link to the right to view an online map of all properties and districts with latitude and longitude coordinates in the table below.

== Current listings ==
This National Park Service list is complete through NPS recent listings posted March 14, 2025.

	Name on the Register	Image	Date listed	Location	City or town	Description
1	American Tobacco Company Prizery	American Tobacco Company Prizery	April 28, 2005 (#05000350)	619 North Herritage Street; 35°16′09″N 77°34′57″W	Kinston	
2	Atlantic and North Carolina Railroad Freight Depot	Atlantic and North Carolina Railroad Freight Depot	November 8, 1989 (#89001768)	East Blount Street between North Queen and North McLewean Streets; 35°15′47″N 77°34′49″W	Kinston	
3	Baptist Parsonage	Baptist Parsonage	November 8, 1989 (#89001767)	211 South McLewean Street; 35°15′28″N 77°34′48″W	Kinston	
4	Robert L. Blalock House	Robert L. Blalock House	November 8, 1989 (#89001772)	300 South McLewean Street; 35°15′25″N 77°34′47″W	Kinston	
5	B. W. Canady House	B. W. Canady House	November 8, 1989 (#89001771)	600 North Queen Street; 35°15′59″N 77°34′54″W	Kinston	
6	Cedar Dell	Cedar Dell	August 26, 1971 (#71000600)	Southeast of Falling Creek on SR 1338; 35°15′17″N 77°41′20″W	Falling Creek	
7	CSS NEUSE (Ironclad Gunboat)	CSS NEUSE (Ironclad Gunboat)	June 11, 2001 (#00000444)	2612 West Vernon Avenue; 35°16′01″N 77°37′18″W	Kinston	
8	Herring House		October 25, 1973 (#73001356)	Northwest of La Grange off SR 1503; 35°19′44″N 77°48′22″W	La Grange	
9	Hill-Grainger Historic District	Hill-Grainger Historic District	November 8, 1989 (#89001764)	Roughly bounded by Summit Avenue, North East Street, East and West Vernon Avenue, and North Herritage Street; 35°16′17″N 77°34′47″W	Kinston	
10	Hotel Kinston	Hotel Kinston	November 8, 1989 (#89001770)	503 North Queen Street; 35°15′54″N 77°34′52″W	Kinston	
11	Imperial Tobacco Company Office Building	Imperial Tobacco Company Office Building	April 17, 2017 (#100000898)	426 N. Herritage St. 35°15′54″N 77°34′59″W	Kinston	
12	Jesse Jackson House		June 24, 1971 (#71000602)	Southeast of Kinston on NC 11; 35°13′33″N 77°38′40″W	Kinston	
13	Kennedy Memorial Home Historic District	Kennedy Memorial Home Historic District	September 3, 2009 (#09000684)	2557 Ceder Dell Lane; 35°15′17″N 77°41′33″W	Kinston	
14	Kinston Apartments	Kinston Apartments	June 22, 2004 (#04000648)	1313 McAdoo Street; 35°16′35″N 77°34′43″W	Kinston	
15	Kinston Baptist-White Rock Presbyterian Church	Kinston Baptist-White Rock Presbyterian Church	November 8, 1989 (#89001773)	516 Thompson Street; 35°15′54″N 77°34′22″W	Kinston	
16	Kinston Battlefield	Kinston Battlefield	November 30, 2006 (#06001104)	1.5 miles (2.4 km) south of Kinston on US 258; 2 to 3 miles (3.2 to 4.8 km) south of Kinston on US 258; 3 miles (4.8 km) south of Kinston on NC 58; 4 miles (6.4 km) south of Kinston on US 258; 35°13′41″N 77°36′36″W	Kinston	
17	Kinston Commercial Historic District	Kinston Commercial Historic District	November 8, 1989 (#89001765)	Roughly N. Queen and Gordon Sts.; also roughly bounded by E. Blount, W. Blount, N. Herritage, W. North, and N. Queen Sts.; also roughly bounded by East and West Caswell, West Gordon, North Herritage, East King, North McLewean, and South Queen Sts., Spruce Alley, and the railroad right-of-way, 35°15′43″N 77°34′52″W	Kinston	Second set of boundaries represents a boundary increase of June 3, 1994, at which time it was also renamed from the Queen–Gordon Streets Historic District. The third set of addresses represent boundary adjustments (additions and removals) approved April 30, 2021.
18	Kinston Fire Station-City Hall	Kinston Fire Station-City Hall	November 8, 1989 (#89001769)	118 South Queen Street; 35°15′34″N 77°34′53″W	Kinston	
19	LaGrange Historic District	LaGrange Historic District	May 11, 2000 (#00000458)	Roughly bounded by North Caswell, East James, North Carey, East Washington, South Caswell, West Washington, and Forbes Streets; 35°18′20″N 77°47′30″W	La Grange	
20	LaGrange Presbyterian Church	LaGrange Presbyterian Church	August 14, 1986 (#86001646)	201 South Caswell Street; 35°18′17″N 77°47′21″W	La Grange	
21	Lenoir County Courthouse	Lenoir County Courthouse	May 10, 1979 (#79001730)	Queen and Kings Streets; 35°15′30″N 77°34′25″W	Kinston	
22	Midtown Motor Lodge	Midtown Motor Lodge	December 27, 2016 (#16000913)	501 N. Herritage St. 35°15′56″N 77°34′58″W	Kinston	
23	Mitchelltown Historic District	Mitchelltown Historic District	November 8, 1989 (#89001766)	Roughly bounded by West Vernon Avenue, North Herritage Street, West Blount Street, College Street, Atlantic Avenue, and Rhem Street; 35°15′58″N 77°35′13″W	Kinston	
24	Peebles House	Peebles House	August 26, 1971 (#71000603)	109 East King Street; 35°15′33″N 77°34′59″W	Kinston	
25	Peoples Bank Building	Peoples Bank Building	November 8, 1998 (#89001774)	242 S. Queen Street; 35°15′28″N 77°34′52″W	Kinston	
26	Standard Drug No. 2	Standard Drug No. 2	December 1, 2014 (#14000987)	100 South Queen Street; 35°15′37″N 77°34′52″W	Kinston	
27	Sumrell and McCoy Building	Sumrell and McCoy Building	December 21, 1989 (#89002134)	400 North Queen Street; 35°15′49″N 77°34′54″W	Kinston	
28	Trianon Historic District	Trianon Historic District	November 8, 1989 (#89001763)	Roughly East Gordon Street from North Tiffany to North Orion Streets and Water Street from North Vance to North Orion Streets; 35°15′40″N 77°34′15″W	Kinston	
29	Tull-Worth-Holland Farm		September 22, 1992 (#92001260)	NC 1579 north side, 0.5 miles (0.80 km) east of junction with NC 1578; 35°18′54″N 77°35′30″W	Kinston	
30	Dempsey Wood House	Dempsey Wood House	August 26, 1971 (#71000601)	Southwest of Falling Creek on SR 1324; 35°13′51″N 77°43′28″W	Kinston	
31	Wyse Fork Battlefield	Wyse Fork Battlefield	July 10, 2017 (#100001301)	Southeast of Kinston; 35°13′36″N 77°31′36″W	Kinston	Extends into Jones County

== See also ==
- National Register of Historic Places listings in North Carolina
- List of National Historic Landmarks in North Carolina
