= Neuseway Nature Center and Planetarium =

Museum in Kingston, North Carolina

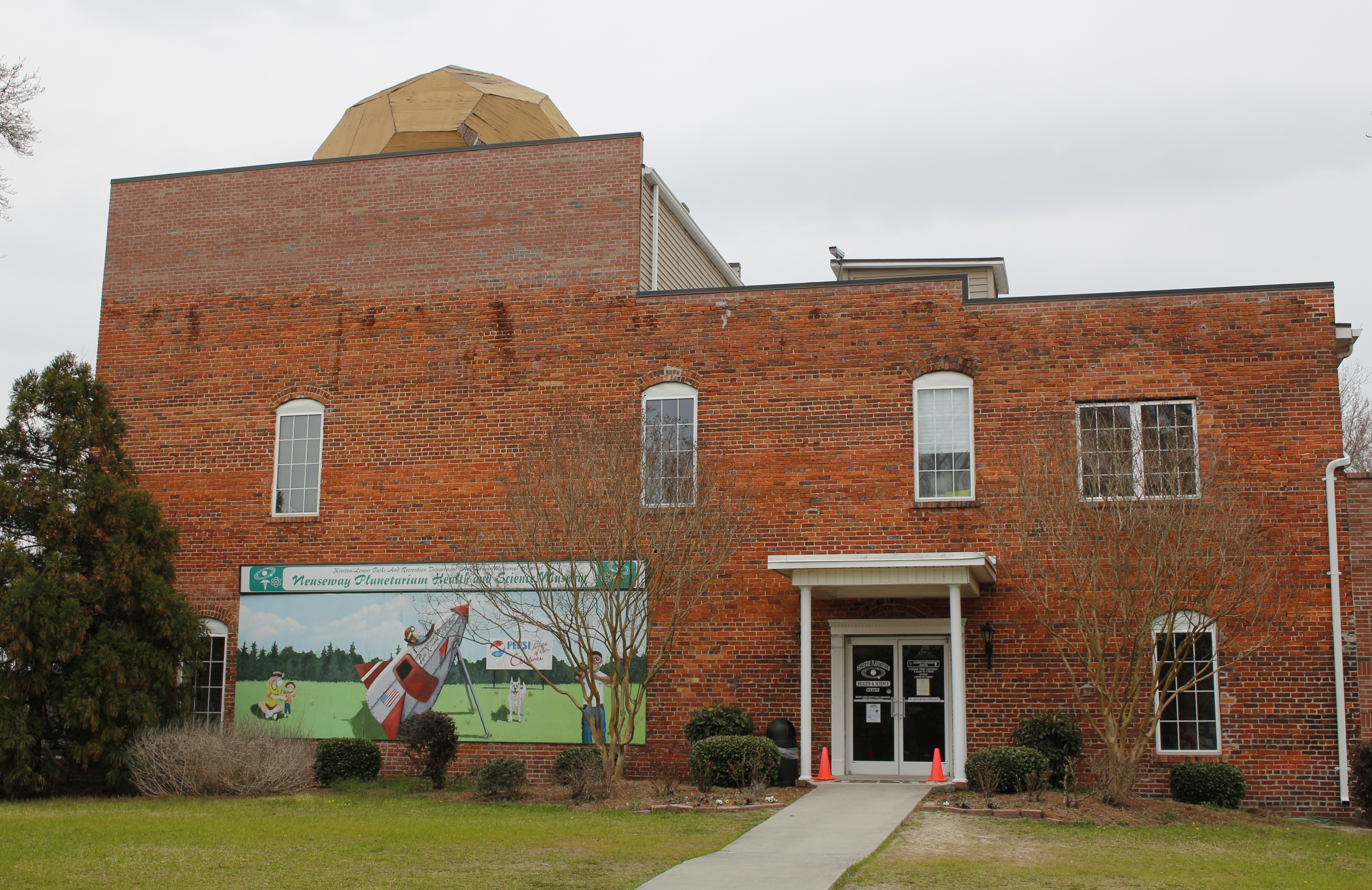

- Shown within North Carolina
- Location: Kinston, North Carolina
- Coordinates: 35.2602045°N 77.5855642°W
- Type: Planetarium
- Public transit access: none
- Website: http://www.neusewaypark.com/museum.html

The Neuseway Nature Center and Planetarium is a science center in Kinston, North Carolina. The facility includes 52 seat planetarium which also includes permanent exhibits focused on public health provided by Lenoir Memorial Hospital and an exhibit of space memorabilia donated by a former NASA engineer. A nature center includes exhibits of reptiles, fish and small mammals native to the area.

The planetarium participates in the North Carolina Science Festival each year hosting a star party for visitors.
