= Midtown Motor Lodge =

- U.S. National Register of Historic Places
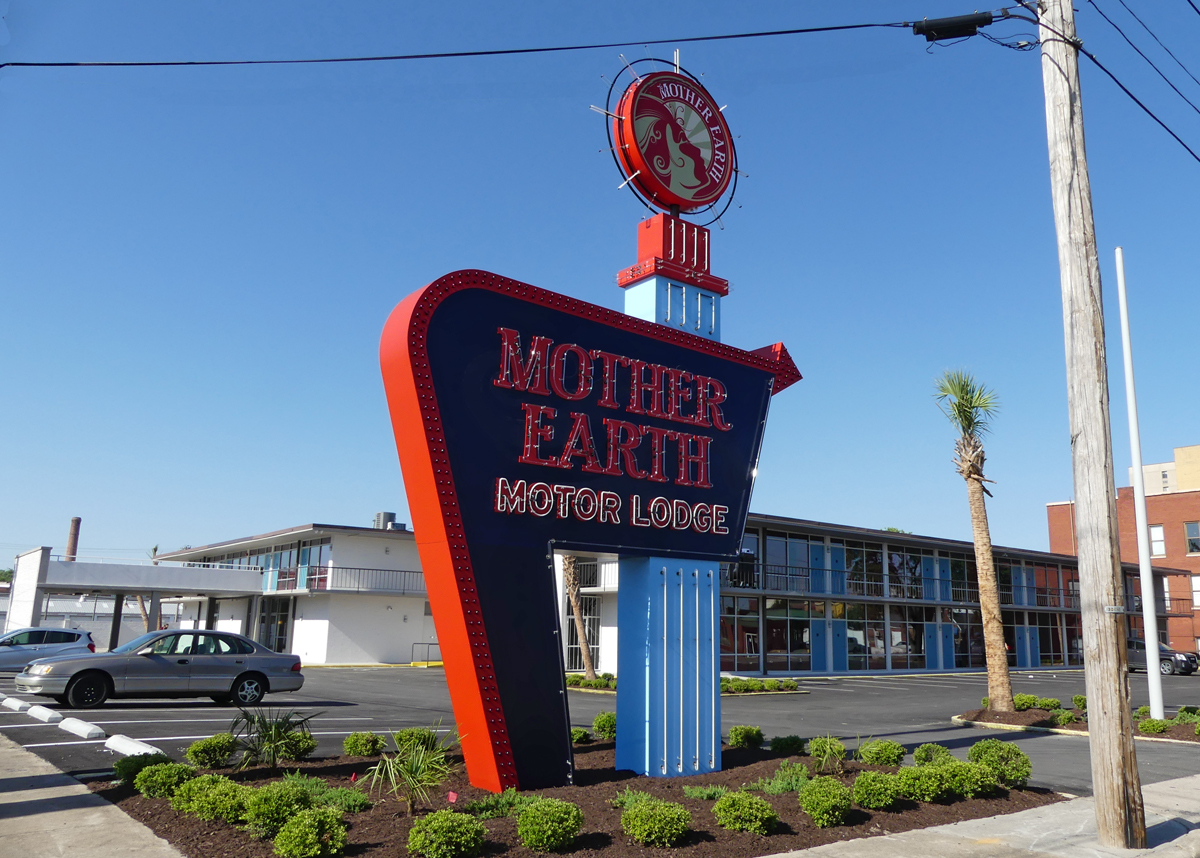
- The current sign for the motel.
- Location: Kinston, North Carolina
- Area: 1.18 acres (0.48 ha)
- Built: 1963
- Architect: John J. Rowland
- Architectural style: Modern Movement
- NRHP reference No.: 16000913
- Added to NRHP: December 27, 2016

The Midtown Motor Lodge, also known as the Kinston Motor Lodge, is a historic building, located in downtown Kinston, North Carolina. Built in 1964, it is a two-story U-shaped modern style motel building utilizing curtain wall construction. It was listed in the U.S. National Register of Historic Places in 2016 for its architecture. Today, it continues to operate as a motel.

== History ==
The motor inn was built to accommodate car travelers traveling through Kinston. It opened the week of August 11, 1963. At the time of its opening, it was one of three motels operating in the Kinston area. The property was sold a number of times beginning in 1970; its current owners bought the property in 2014. During the 1970s and 1990s, the motel fell into disrepair due to the decline of the tobacco and shirt industries and the construction of a new hotel in Kinston.
