= Ola B. Watford =

American geophysicist (1927–1997)

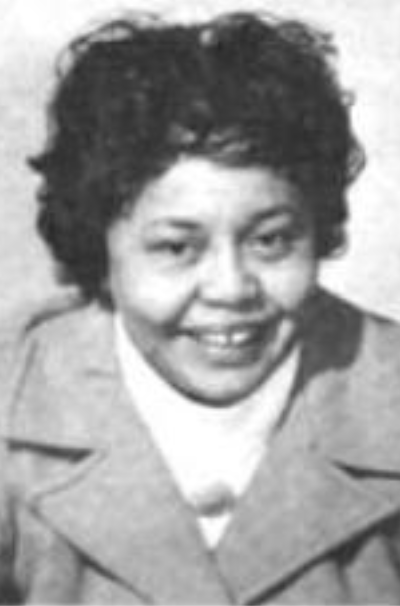
- Ola B. Watford, from a 1972 publication of the NOAA
- Born: Ola Mae Bryant; March 13, 1927; Kinston, North Carolina
- Died: October 18, 1997 (aged 70)
- Occupation: Geophysicist

Ola Mae Bryant Watford (March 13, 1927 – October 18, 1997) was an American geophysicist, associated with the United States Department of Commerce for over twenty years.

== Early life and education ==
Bryant was from Kinston, North Carolina, the daughter of Benjamin Cleveland Bryant and Georgia S. Taylor Bryant. Her father was a Baptist minister, publisher and tobacco farmer. She earned a bachelor's degree in mathematics from Johnson C. Smith University in 1946, at age 19, where she was a member of Delta Sigma Theta sorority. She moved to Washington, D.C. for further education. She completed a master's degree at the University of Northern Colorado later in life.

== Career ==
Watford taught high school math for a few years as a young woman, then began working for the federal government as a clerk at the Naval Oceanographic Office in 1951. She moved to the United States Coast and Geodetic Survey in 1953. She was described in 1973 as the only woman geophysicist employed by the United States Department of Commerce, when she worked at the National Geophysical and Solar Terrestrial Data Center in Boulder, Colorado, charting and analyzing data on geomagnetism. She also served on the Environmental Science Services Administration's Equal Employment Opportunity Committee, and was the Federal Woman's Program representative for the Environmental Data Service. In 1973 she accompanied a traveling USGS exhibit about the earth sciences, and attended the meeting of the Geological Society of America. By 1981, she was chief of the Space Management and Design branch of the NOAA in Rockville, Maryland.

Watford was first-author on one journal article, "Isomagnetic patterns in the regions of the 1965 dip poles" (1965), with W. A. Francis, G. B. Walker, and E. B. Fabiano.

== Personal life ==
Ola Mae Bryant married economist Alven Wardell Watford in 1947. They had six children, five sons and a daughter. Her husband died in 1991, and she died in 1997, aged 70 years. Her grave is with her husband's, in Quantico National Cemetery.
