= Temple Israel (Kinston, North Carolina) =

Reform synagogue in North Carolina, US

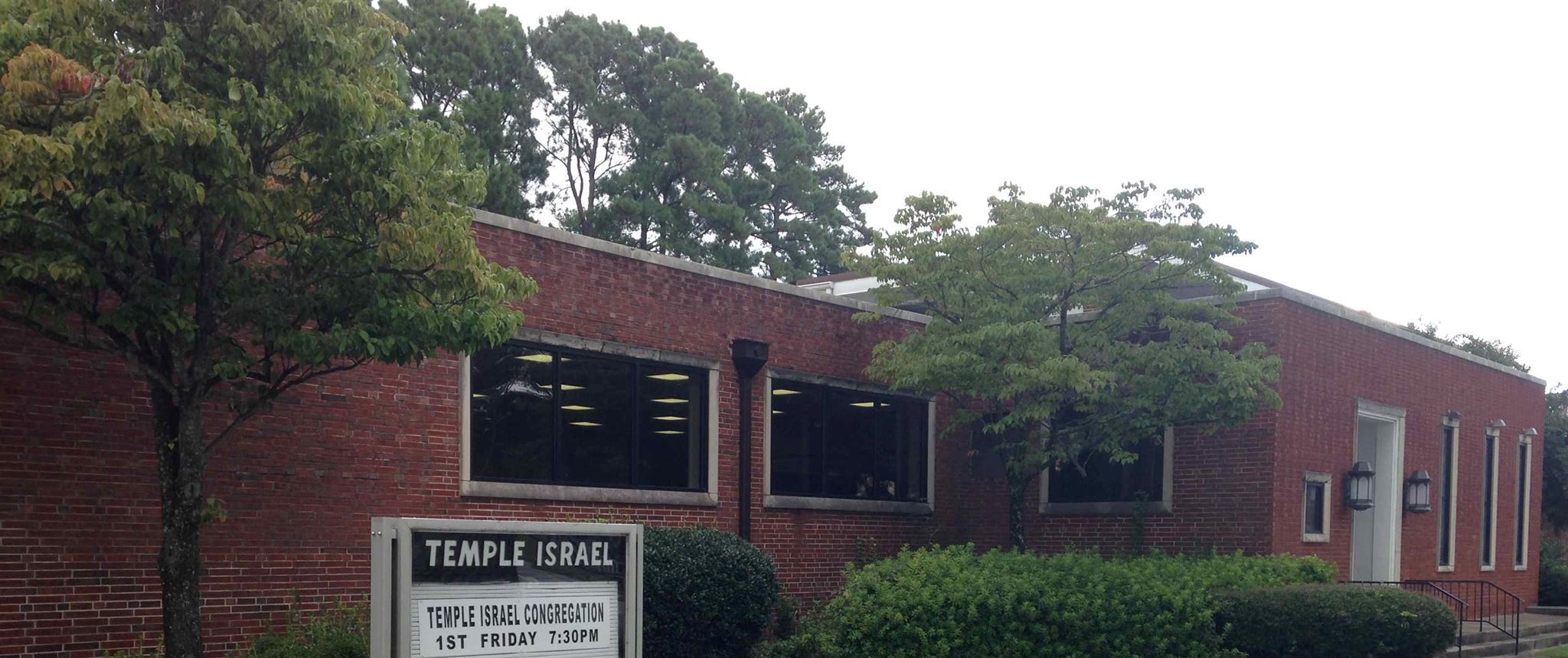
- Temple Israel in 2021

- Location in North Carolina

Religion
- Affiliation: Reform Judaism
- Ecclesiastical or organizational status: Synagogue
- Leadership: Lay led
- Status: Active

Location
- Location: 1109 West Vernon Avenue, Kinston, North Carolina 28501
- Country: United States
- Interactive map of Temple Israel
- Coordinates: 35°16′14″N 77°35′46″W

Architecture
- Type: Synagogue
- Established: 1903 (as a congregation)
- Completed: 1950

Specifications
- Capacity: 200 worshippers
- Materials: Brick

Website
- synagoguekinstonnc.org

Temple Israel is a Reform Jewish congregation and synagogue located at 1109 West Vernon Avenue, on the corner of Laroque Street, in Kinston, North Carolina, in the United States. Established by Eastern European Jews in 1903, it is one of the oldest synagogues in North Carolina. Having started and functioning as an Orthodox congregation during its first forty years, it transformed into a Reform congregation in the late 1940s.

== History ==
Established in 1903, Tifereth Israel was the first congregation in Kinston. Originally Orthodox, the synagogue hired Rabbi Isaac Goodkovitz, who served until 1916. As more European Jews emigrated to the small, eastern North Carolina town, the congregation grew as well. By the mid-1920s more than 140 Jewish families lived in Kinston, a town with a population of only 8,000.

In 1924, Tifereth Israel purchased the Second Methodist Church and converted it into a synagogue. This marked the first, formal building to be dedicated to a synagogue in Kinston. This building served the congregation through World War II, until its present structure was built in 1950. A modern, brick structure with a sanctuary capable of seating more than 200 for the High Holy Days, and a half-dozen religious school classrooms, which was made possible through generous donations of the Brody, Stadiem, Cohen, Schechter, Fuchs, and Heilig families.

During the 1950s, Rabbi Jerome Tolochko was hired by the synagogue and he moved the synagogue away from its traditional, Orthodox-style worship to a more Reform style of worship. Mixed seating, a mixed-voice choir, and an organ were introduced. Furthermore, the congregation officially changed its name to "Temple Israel".

With the decline of industry and commerce to Kinston in the late 1970s and early 1980s, the Jewish community also declined. Most Jewish families began to leave, and Temple Israel’s membership plummeted from 180 families in 1952 to only 40 families in 1982. By the 1990s, Temple Israel could no longer afford to support a full-time rabbi and has thus been without a rabbi for more than a decade.

The synagogue also owned a Jewish cemetery, which is currently maintained by the city of Kinston.

As of 2009, there were sixteen members of Temple Israel in Kinston, who met once a month for Shabbat services and for the High Holy Days.

The congregation shares the building with the Unitarian Universalist Congregation of Kinston.

== Notable members ==
- Brody Brothers Dry Goods Company founders Leo, Jake, Sam, and Julius (“Sammy”) Brody
- Heilig-Meyers retail furniture store chain co-founder, W.A. Heilig
- Henry C. Pearson, an abstract artist
