= Mother Earth Brewing =

Manufacturer brewed companies

- Location: Kinston, North Carolina, USA
- Opened: 2009

Active beers
| Name | Type |
| Endless River | German Kolsch |
| Weeping Willow Wit | Belgian Witbier |
| Long Weekend | India Pale Ale |
| Vanishing Tides | Premium Lager |
| Alpenglow | Hazy IPA |

Seasonal beers
| Name | Type |
| Silent Night | Bourbon Barrel-Aged Imperial Stout |

Mother Earth Brewing is a craft beer brewery located in Kinston, North Carolina. The brewery was founded in late 2008 by owners Stephen Hill and Trent Mooring and began production in 2009.

== Beers ==
Mother Earth currently produces five core beers: an India Pale Ale called Long Weekend, a Kolsch-style ale called Endless River, a Belgian Wit beer called Weeping Willow Wit, a Hazy IPA called Alpenglow, and a Premium Lager called Vanishing Tides.

In addition to these beers, Mother Earth has a seasonal large format beer released each year: Silent Night, an Imperial Stout brewed with coffee from Raleigh boutique coffee roaster Counter Culture Coffee and also aged in bourbon barrels.

== See also ==
- Barrel-aged beer
