= Hill–Grainger Historic District =

Historic district in North Carolina, United States

- U.S. National Register of Historic Places
- U.S. Historic district
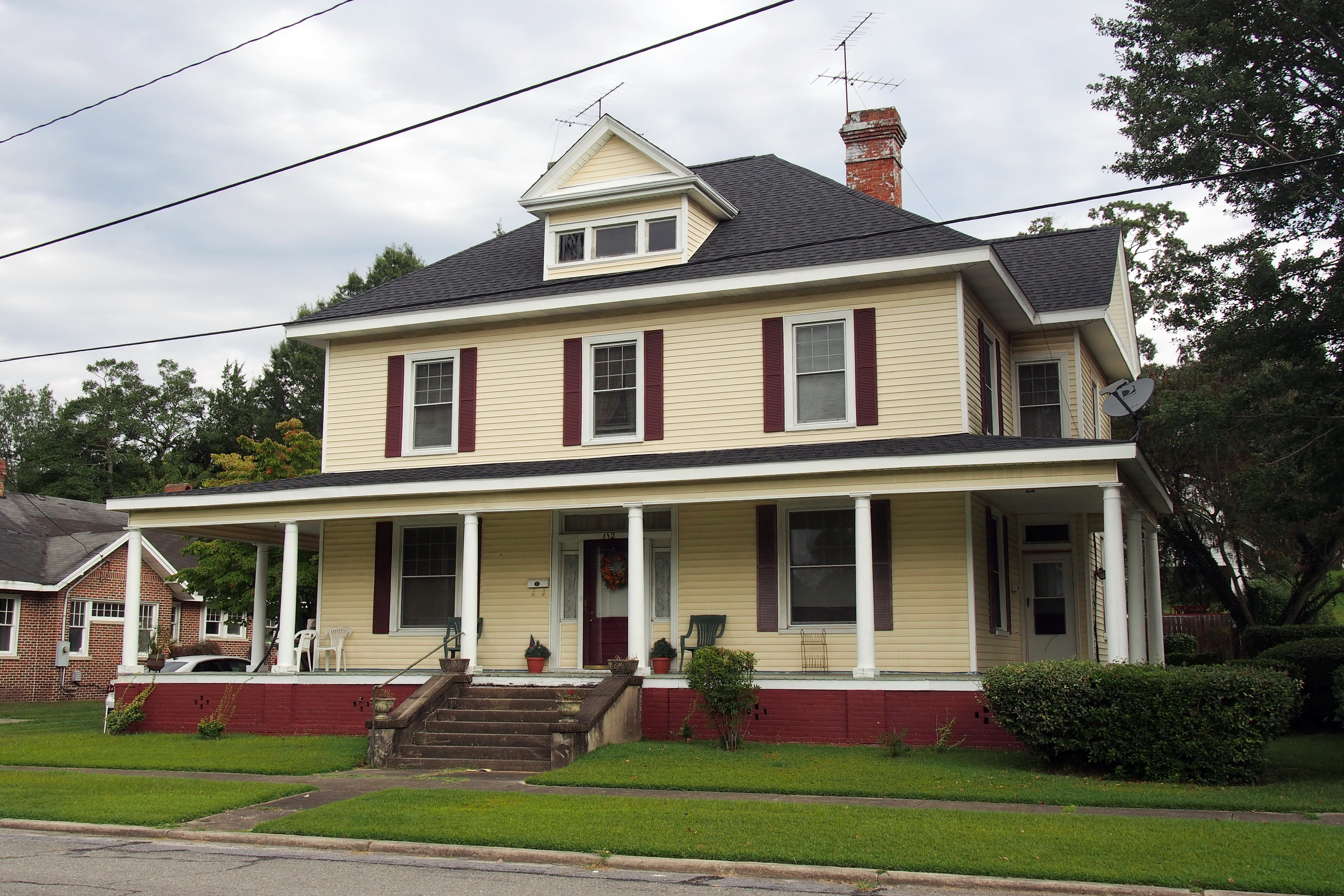
- House in the Hill–Grainger Historic District, September 2014

- Location within North Carolina Location within the United States
- Location: Roughly bounded by Summit Ave., N. East St., E. & W. Vernon Ave., and N. Heritage St., Kinston, North Carolina
- Coordinates: 35°16′17″N 77°34′47″W
- Area: 81 acres (33 ha)
- Built: 1904
- Architect: Multiple
- Architectural style: Late 19th And 20th Century Revivals, Bungalow/craftsman, Queen Anne
- MPS: Kinston MPS
- NRHP reference No.: 89001764
- Added to NRHP: November 8, 1989

Hill–Grainger Historic District, also known as the North Queen Street Area, is a national historic district located at Kinston, Lenoir County, North Carolina, USA. It encompasses 172 contributing buildings in a predominantly residential section of Kinston. The buildings include notable examples of Queen Anne, Colonial Revival, Tudor Revival and Bungalow / American Craftsman style architecture and date between 1900 and 1941. Notable buildings include the (former) Grainger High School, Sarahurst (1902-1904), Vernon Hall (1913-1914), (second) H. C. Hines House (1929), Canady-Sutton House (c. 1925), Hobgood-Sparrow House (1926), (first) H. C. Hines House (c. 1917), and the Fields Rasberry House.

It was listed on the National Register of Historic Places in 1989.
