= Kinston Apartments =

Historic apartment complex in North Carolina, US

- U.S. National Register of Historic Places
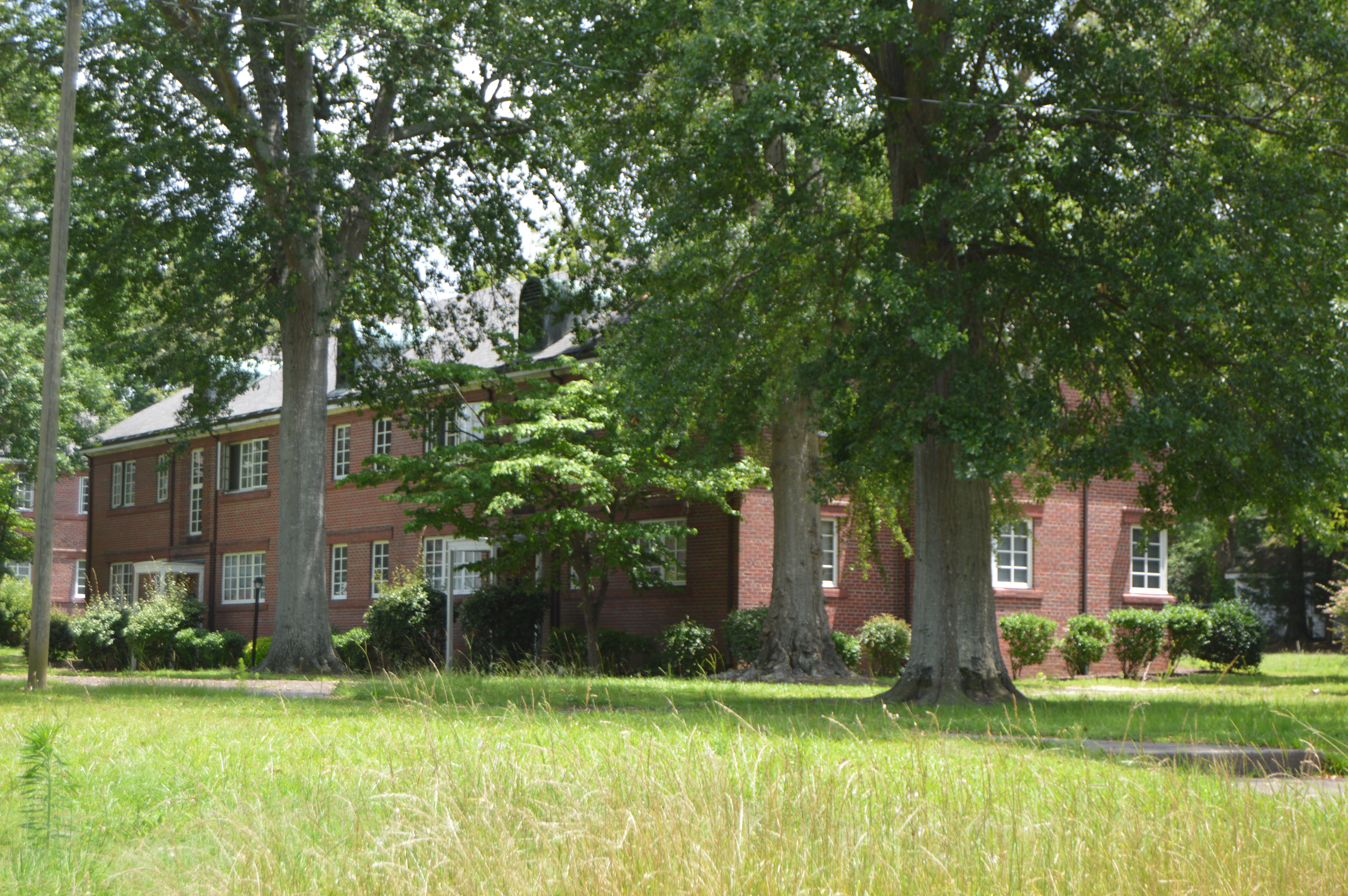
- Part of the complex

- Location within North Carolina Location within the United States
- Location: 1313 McAdoo St., Kinston, North Carolina
- Coordinates: 35°16′35″N 77°34′43″W
- Area: 2.5 acres (1.0 ha)
- Built: c. 1940
- Architect: Wooten, A. Mitchell
- Architectural style: Colonial Revival, Moderne
- NRHP reference No.: 04000648
- Added to NRHP: June 22, 2004

Kinston Apartments is a historic apartment complex located in Kinston, Lenoir County, North Carolina. It was built about 1940, and is a five building Colonial Revival style brick-faced complex, with the buildings positioned in a "U"-shape. The buildings are two-story, with full basements, and have Moderne style decorative elements. Three of the buildings have four apartment units, with two having two three-bedroom apartments. The buildings were renovated in 2003. It is locally referred to as Kinston Oaks.

It was listed on the National Register of Historic Places in 2004.
