= Sumrell and McCoy Building =

- U.S. National Register of Historic Places
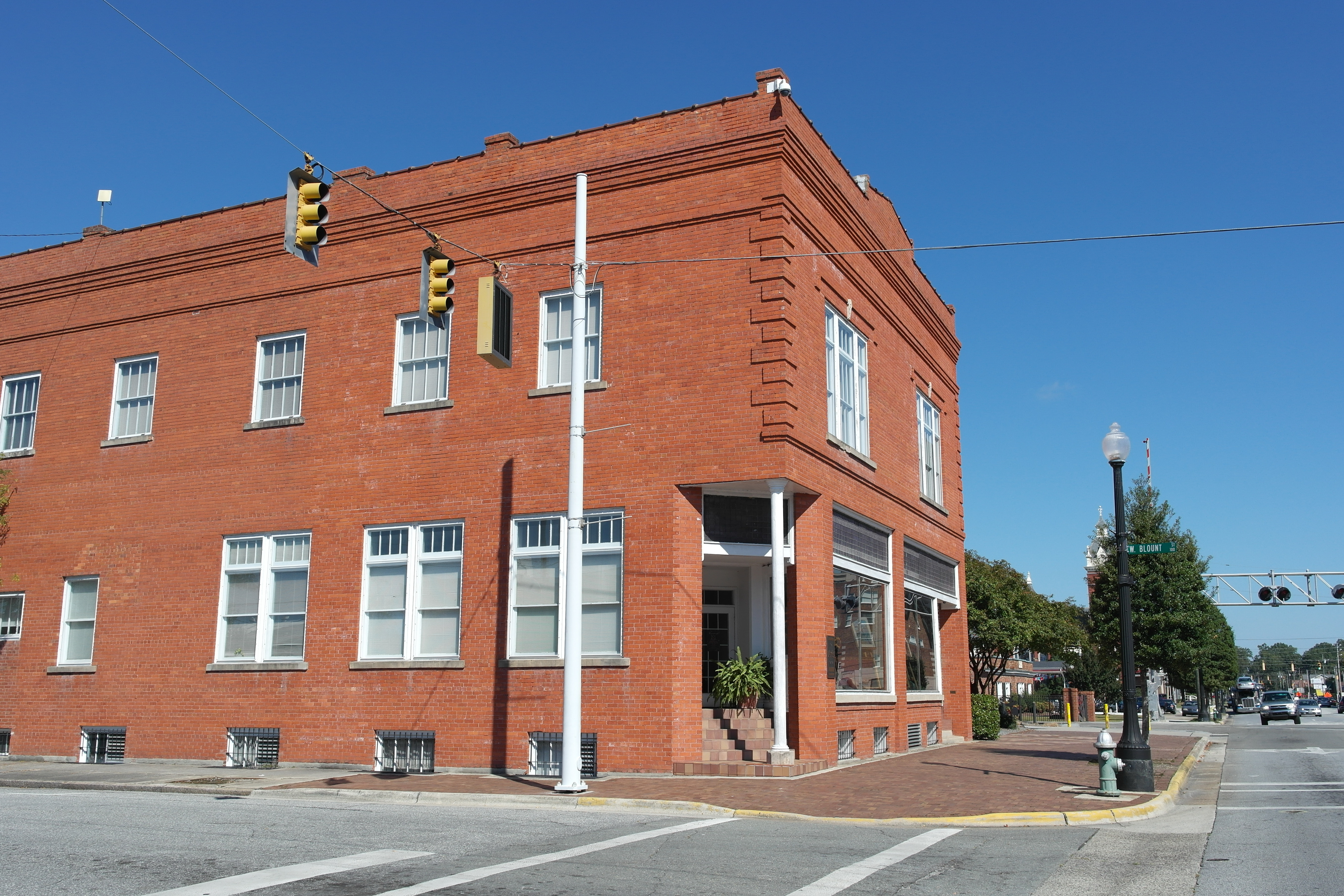
- Sumrell and McCoy Building, September 2013

- Location within North Carolina Location within the United States
- Location: 400 N. Queen St., Kinston, North Carolina
- Coordinates: 35°15′49″N 77°34′54″W
- Area: 0.2 acres (0.081 ha)
- Built: 1910
- Architectural style: Early Commercial
- MPS: Kinston MPS
- NRHP reference No.: 89002134
- Added to NRHP: December 21, 1989

Sumrell and McCoy Building is a historic commercial / industrial building located at Kinston, Lenoir County, North Carolina, built in 1910. It is a two-story and basement brick structure of heavy post and beam construction, using both wood and steel members. It has a raised parapet, topped by tile coping. The building measures 30,000 square feet, and housed a wholesale grocery business.

It was listed on the National Register of Historic Places in 1989.
