= Standard Drug No. 2 =

Historic building in North Carolina, US

- U.S. National Register of Historic Places
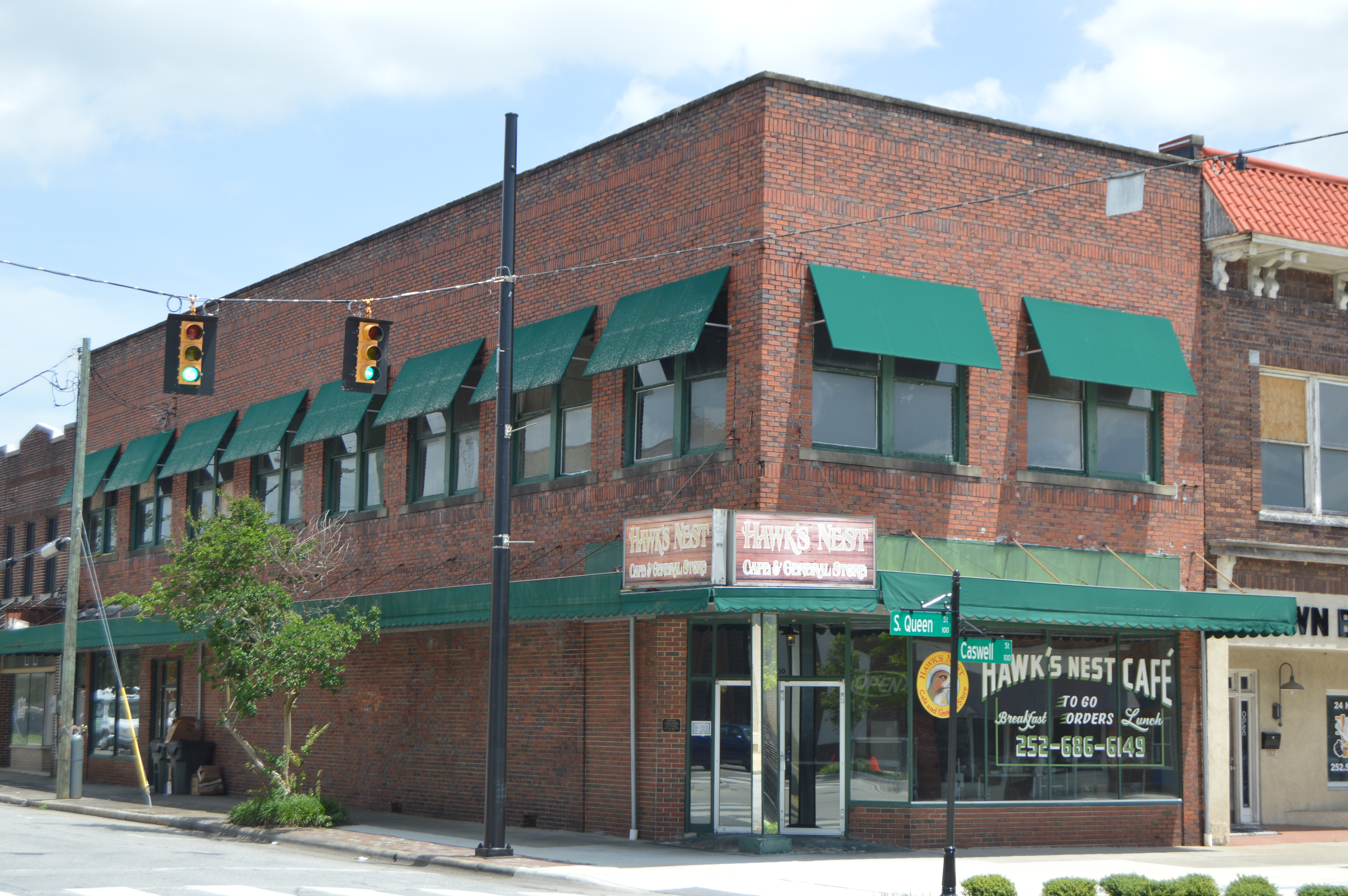
- Northern side and front

- Location within North Carolina Location within the United States
- Location: 100 South Queen Street, Kinston, North Carolina
- Coordinates: 35°15′36″N 77°34′52″W
- Area: 0.06 acres (0.024 ha)
- Built: 1918-1924
- Architectural style: Commercial Style, Art Deco
- NRHP reference No.: 14000987
- Added to NRHP: December 1, 2014

The Standard Drug No. 2 is a historic commercial building located in Kinston, Lenoir County, North Carolina. It was built between 1918 and 1924, and is a two-story, brick Commercial Style with street level, plate-glass windows. The interior retains an Art Deco-style lunch counter and pressed metal ceiling. Sit-ins were held at the lunch counter in 1960 and 1961, to protest segregation.

It was listed on the National Register of Historic Places in 2014.
