= Trianon Historic District =

Historic district in North Carolina, United States

- U.S. National Register of Historic Places
- U.S. Historic district
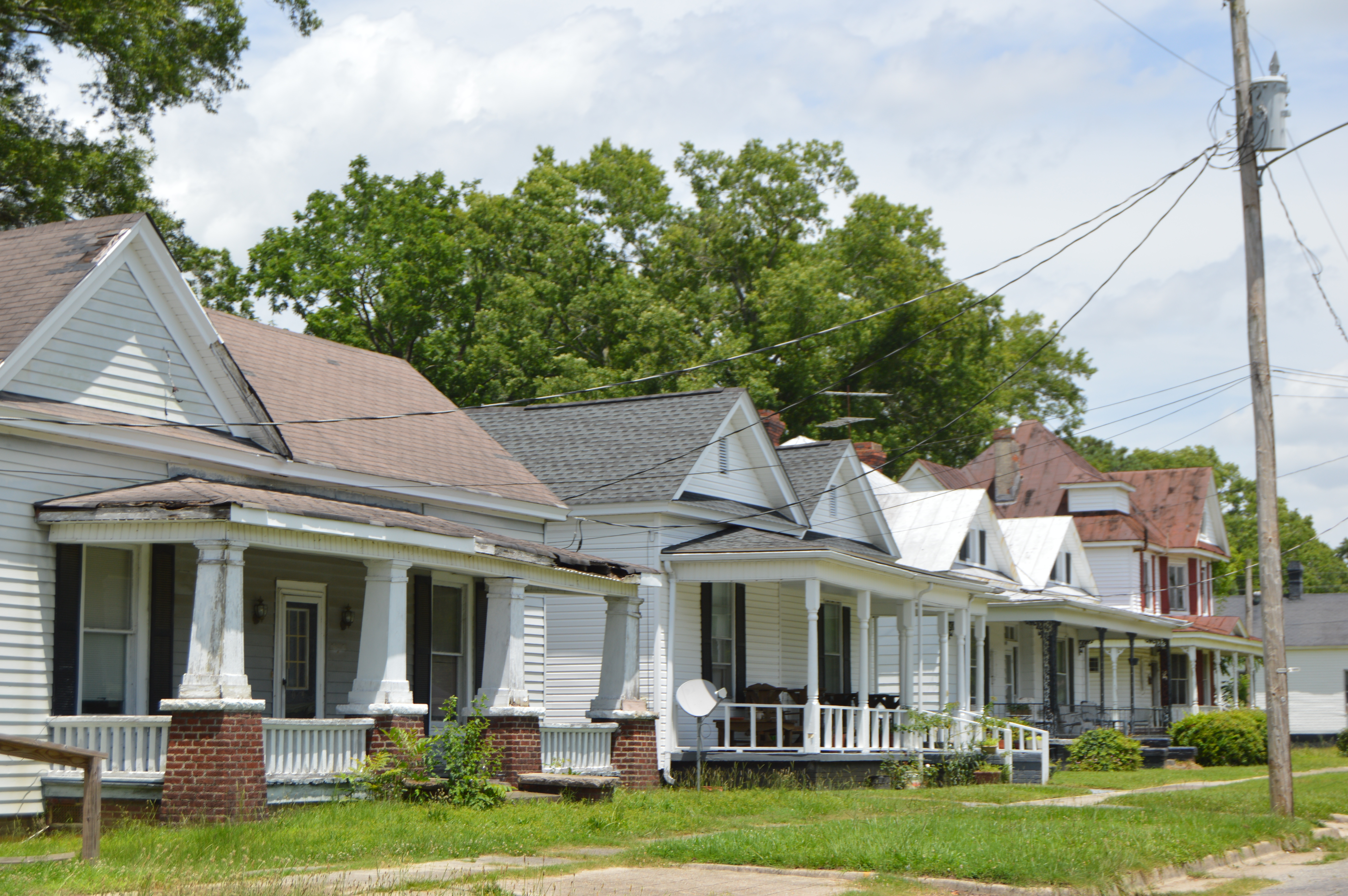
- Houses on Gordon Street

- Location within North Carolina Location within the United States
- Location: Roughly E. Gordon St. from N. Tiffany to N. Orion Sts. and Water St. from N. Vance to N. Orion Sts., Kinston, North Carolina
- Coordinates: 35°15′40″N 77°34′15″W
- Area: 9.5 acres (3.8 ha)
- Built: 1893
- Architectural style: Colonial Revival, Bungalow/craftsman, Queen Anne
- MPS: Kinston MPS
- NRHP reference No.: 89001763
- Added to NRHP: November 8, 1989

Trianon Historic District is a national historic district located at Kinston, Lenoir County, North Carolina. It encompasses 33 contributing buildings and 1 contributing site in a predominantly residential section of Kinston. The buildings include notable examples of Queen Anne, Colonial Revival, and Bungalow / American Craftsman style architecture and date between 1893 and 1930. Notable buildings include the McDaniel-Sutton House (1904), J. C. Raspberry Rental House (c. 1898), Wooten-Black House (1913-1914), George W. Sumrell House (c. 1899), E. T. Turnley House (c. 1925), J. D. Arnold House (c. 1931), and Lizzie Grady House (c. 1912).

It was listed on the National Register of Historic Places in 1989.
