= Peoples Bank Building =

Historic building in North Carolina, US

- U.S. National Register of Historic Places
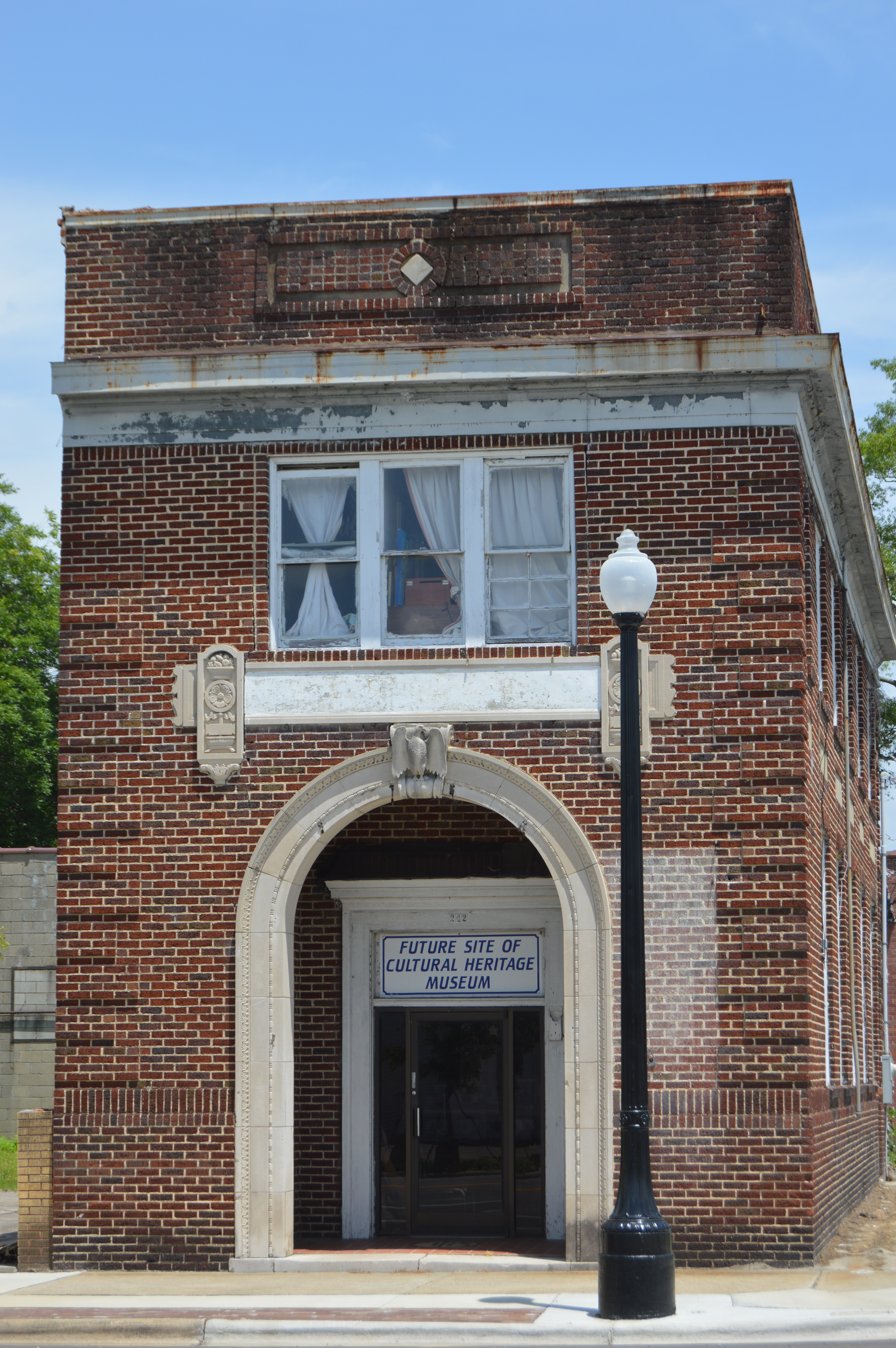
- Facade

- Location within North Carolina Location within the United States
- Location: 242 S. Queen St., Kinston, North Carolina
- Coordinates: 35°15′27.5″N 77°34′52″W
- Area: 0.1 acres (0.040 ha)
- Built: c. 1923
- Architectural style: Classical Revival
- MPS: Kinston MPS
- NRHP reference No.: 89001774
- Added to NRHP: November 8, 1998

Peoples Bank Building is a historic bank building located at Kinston, Lenoir County, North Carolina. It was built about 1923, and is a modest two-story, cinder block building, sheathed in brick and in the Classical Revival style. It has a flat roof with raised parapet ornamented by brick panels outlined in limestone. The front facade features a large arched opening with a stone surround. The building housed one of only two African-American-owned banks to operate in the city of Kinston. The bank ceased to operate in 1931, and the building has housed a number of commercial enterprises.

It was listed on the National Register of Historic Places in 1989.
