= Kinston Baptist-White Rock Presbyterian Church =

Historic church in North Carolina, United States

- Kinston Baptist--White Rock Presbyterian Church
- U.S. National Register of Historic Places
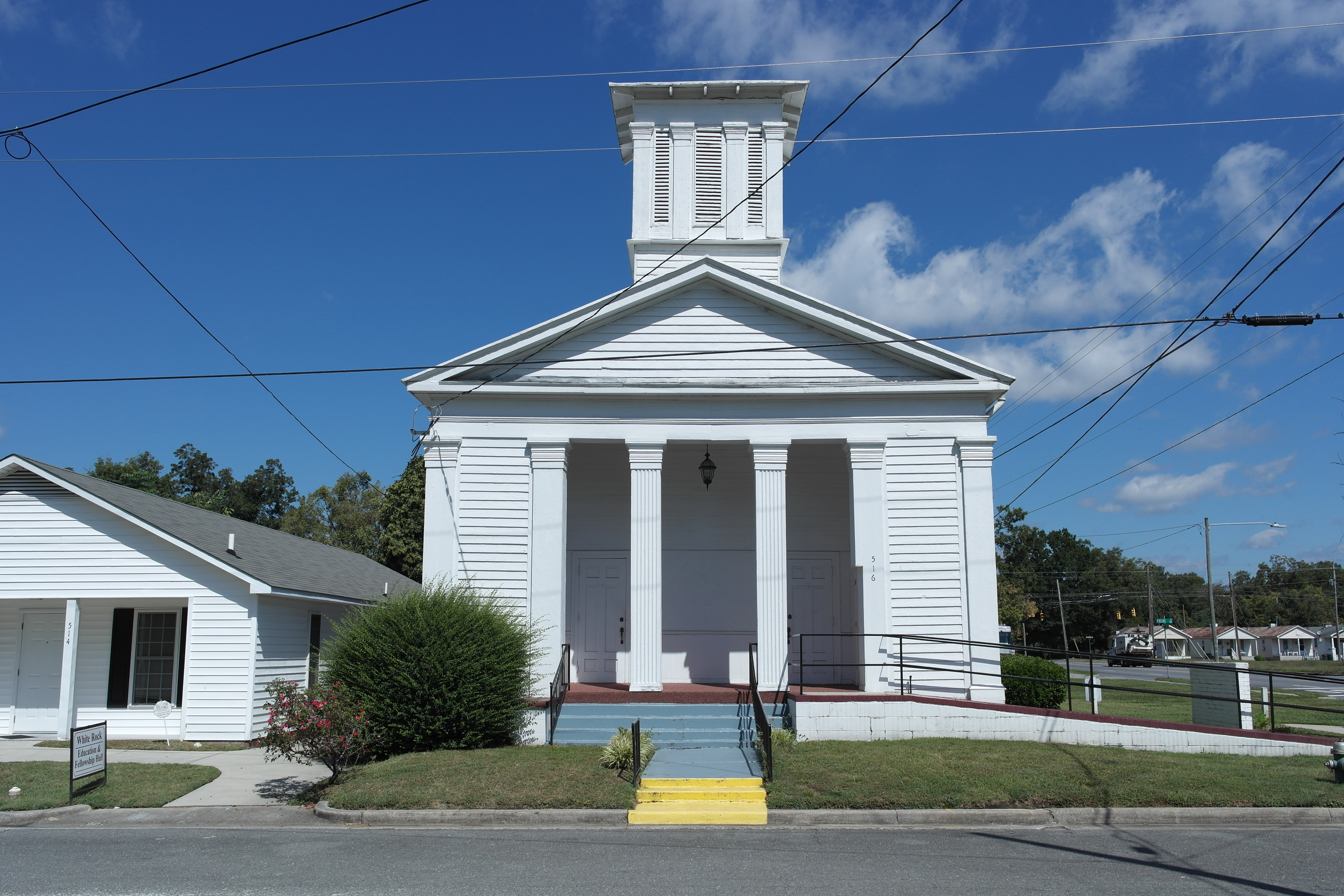

- Location within North Carolina Location within the United States
- Location: 516 Thompson St., Kinston, North Carolina
- Coordinates: 35°15′54″N 77°34′22″W
- Area: 0.1 acres (0.040 ha)
- Built: 1858
- Architectural style: Greek Revival
- MPS: Kinston MPS
- NRHP reference No.: 89001773
- Added to NRHP: November 8, 1989

Kinston Baptist-White Rock Presbyterian Church is a historic Presbyterian and Baptist church building located at 516 Thompson Street in Kinston, Lenoir County, North Carolina. It was built in 1857–1858, and is a rectangular, temple-form Greek Revival style frame building with a pedimented front gable roof. It features a bold distyle in antis portico with enclosed end bays. The church was built for the Kinston Baptist Church and moved to its present (third) location in 1901 after its purchase by an African-American Presbyterian congregation (White Rock Church) which it has served since that time.

It was listed on the National Register of Historic Places in 1989.
