= Jesse Jackson House =

Historic house in North Carolina, United States

- U.S. National Register of Historic Places
- Location within North Carolina Location within the United States
- Location: Southeast of Kinston on NC 11, near Kinston, North Carolina
- Coordinates: 35°13′33″N 77°38′40″W
- Area: 108.9 acres (44.1 ha)
- Built: c. 1840
- Architectural style: Greek Revival
- NRHP reference No.: 71000602
- Added to NRHP: June 24, 1971

Jesse Jackson House is a historic home located near Kinston, Lenoir County, North Carolina. It was built about 1840 by plantation owner Jesse Jackson Sr., and is a two-story, five-bay, Greek Revival style frame dwelling. It has a gable roof, sits on a brick foundation, and has flanking concave shouldered chimneys. The front facade features a one-story porch featuring a diminutive entablature supported by wooden pillars.

It was listed on the National Register of Historic Places in 1971.
