= Hotel Kinston =

Historic building in North Carolina, US

- U.S. National Register of Historic Places
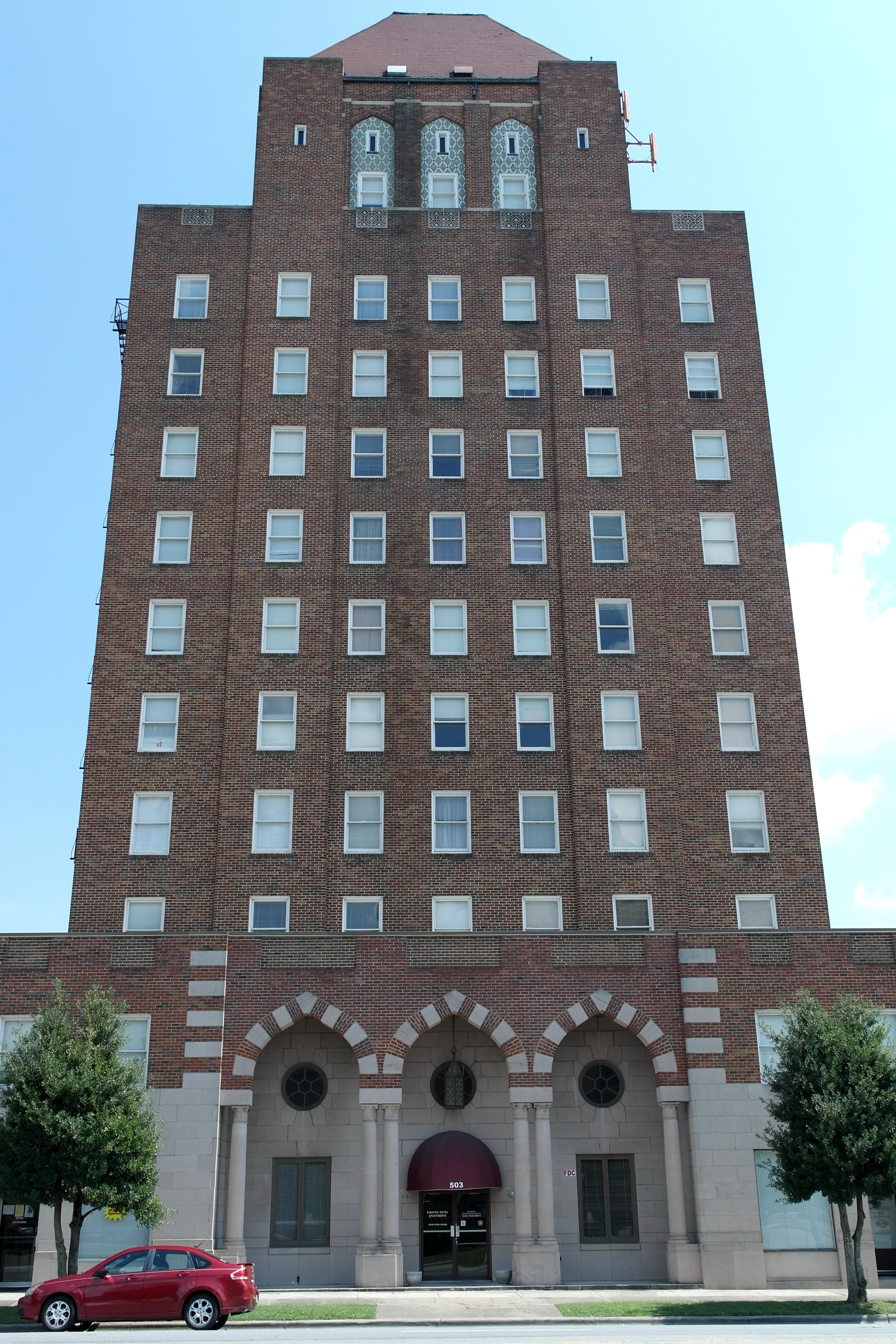
- Hotel Kinston, September 2013

- Location within North Carolina Location within the United States
- Location: 503 N. Queen St., Kinston, North Carolina
- Coordinates: 35°15′54″N 77°34′52″W
- Area: 0.5 acres (0.20 ha)
- Built: 1927-1928
- Architect: Hunter, Herbert; Stout, Joe W.
- Architectural style: Art Deco, Moorish
- MPS: Kinston MPS
- NRHP reference No.: 89001770
- Added to NRHP: November 8, 1989

Hotel Kinston is an historic hotel building located at Kinston, Lenoir County, North Carolina. It was built in 1927–1928, and is an 11-story, steel frame Art Deco-style building. It is sheathed in red brick with cast stone Moorish stylistic details at the main entrance and top floors. It was operated as a hotel until the 1960s. It houses senior citizen apartments.

It was listed on the National Register of Historic Places in 1989.
