= Baptist Parsonage =

Historic house in North Carolina, United States

- U.S. National Register of Historic Places
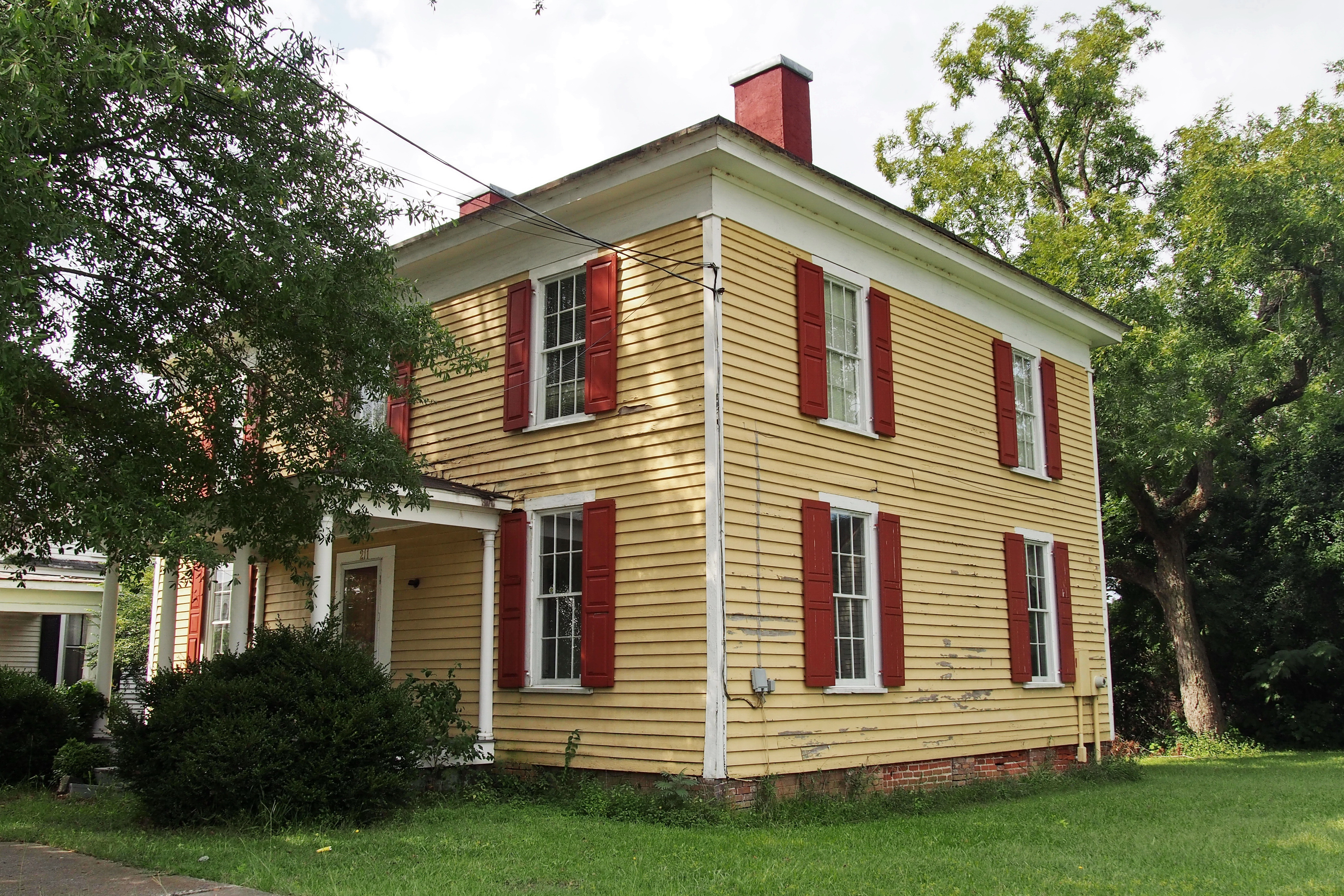

- Location within North Carolina Location within the United States
- Location: 211 S. McLewean St., Kinston, North Carolina
- Coordinates: 35°15′28″N 77°34′48″W
- Area: 0.2 acres (0.081 ha)
- Built: 1858
- Architectural style: Greek Revival
- MPS: Kinston MPS
- NRHP reference No.: 89001767
- Added to NRHP: November 8, 1989

Baptist Parsonage, also known as Archbell House, is a historic Baptist church parsonage located at 211 S. McLewean Street in Kinston, Lenoir County, North Carolina. It was built about 1858, and is a two-story, double-pile, center-hall-plan Greek Revival style frame dwelling. It is sheathed with weatherboard siding, has a hipped roof, and paired stuccoed interior chimneys.

It was listed on the National Register of Historic Places in 1989.
