= Atlantic and North Carolina Railroad Freight Depot =

Demolished historic building in North Carolina, US

- U.S. National Register of Historic Places
- Location within North Carolina Location within the United States
- Location: E. Blount St. between N. Queen and N. McLewean Sts., Kinston, North Carolina
- Coordinates: 35°15′47″N 77°34′49″W
- Area: less than one acre
- Built: 1900
- Architectural style: Romanesque, Industrial Romanesque
- MPS: Kinston MPS
- NRHP reference No.: 89001768
- Added to NRHP: November 8, 1989

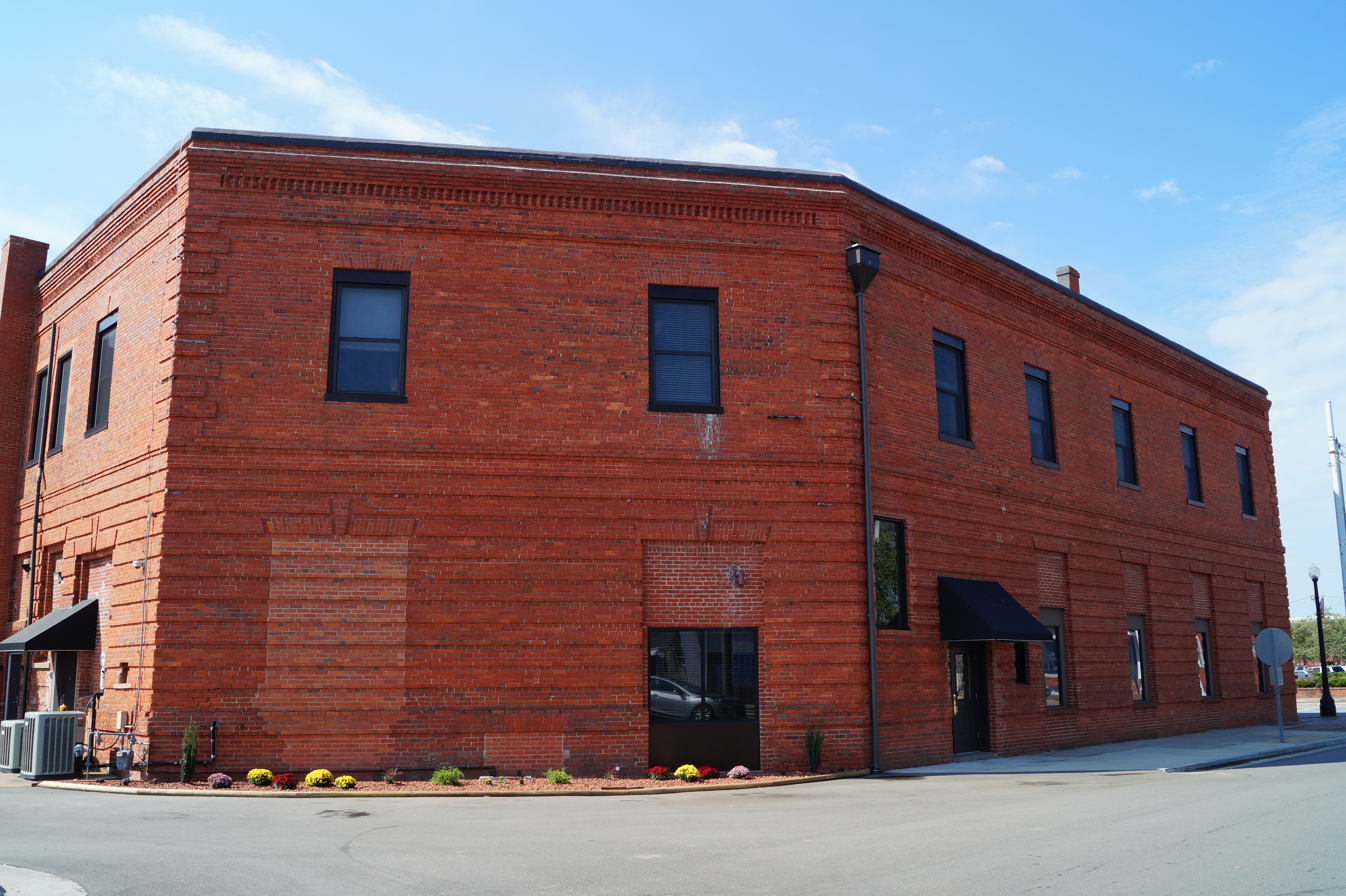
The former Atlantic and North Carolina Railroad Freight Depot

Atlantic and North Carolina Railroad Freight Depot was a historic freight depot located at Kinston, Lenoir County, North Carolina. It was built in 1900 by the Atlantic and North Carolina Railroad, and is a two-story Romanesque style building faced in tan brick. It had a standing seam tin gable roof with a monitor roof and 11 freight bays.

It was listed on the National Register of Historic Places in 1989 but nevertheless was razed in 2009.
