= American Tobacco Company Prizery =

Historic building in North Carolina, US

- U.S. National Register of Historic Places
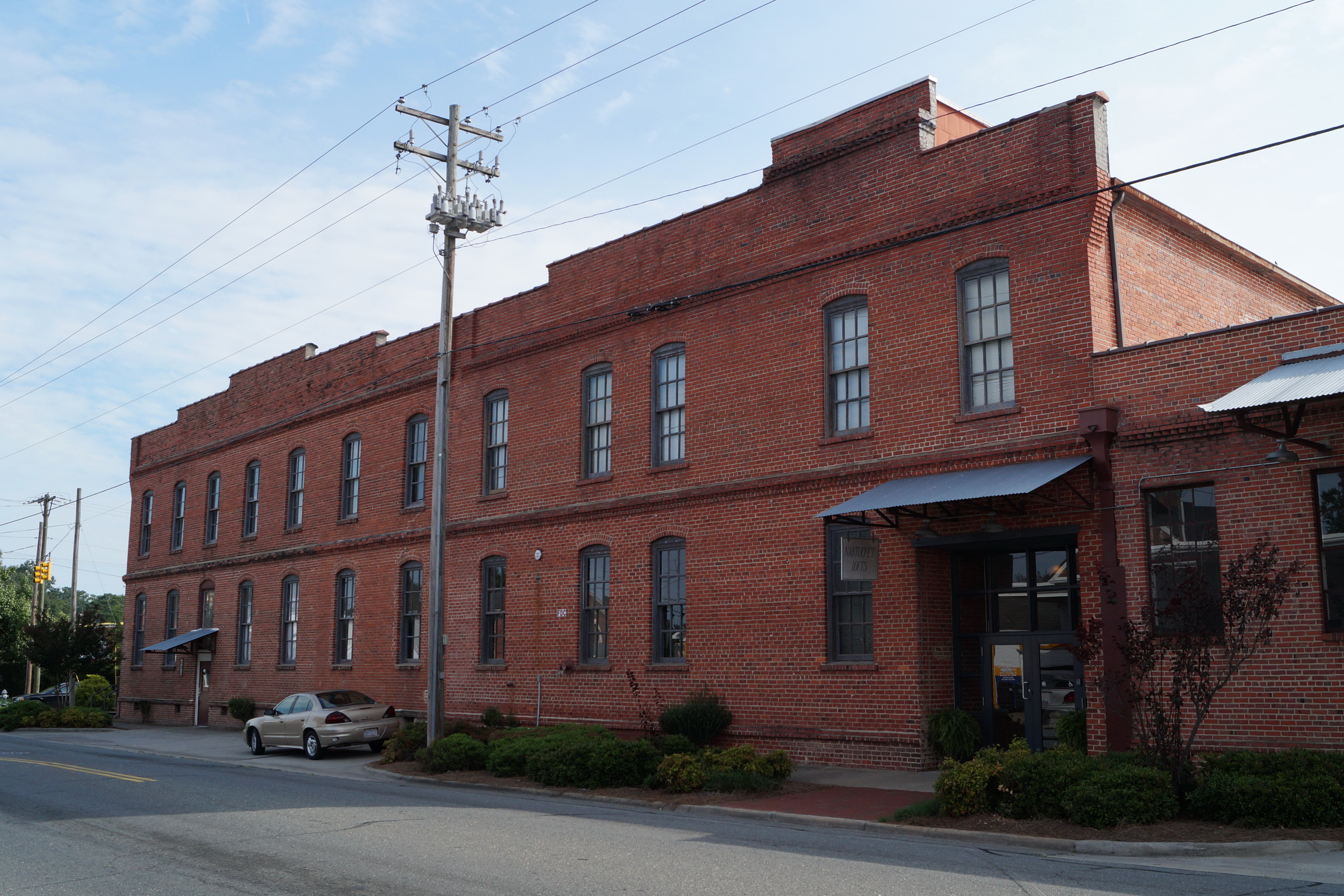
- American Tobacco Company Prizery, September 2014

- Location within North Carolina Location within the United States
- Location: 619 N. Herritage St., Kinston, North Carolina
- Coordinates: 35°16′9″N 77°34′57″W
- Area: 1 acre (0.40 ha)
- Built: 1901
- Architectural style: Heavy Timber Mill Construction
- NRHP reference No.: 05000350
- Added to NRHP: April 28, 2005

American Tobacco Company Prizery, also known as the Nantucket Warehouse, is a historic tobacco prizery located at Kinston, Lenoir County, North Carolina. It was built in 1901 by the American Tobacco Company, and is a two-story, load-bearing brick building that was constructed in five phases beginning about 1901. The facility’s “prizery” name refers to its specialized function, the operation of a screw press to pack tobacco in hogsheads for shipping.

The ATC prizery was enlarged between 1901 and 1908, and again in 1925, 1930 and 1949. In the building’s final form, it has a complex roof structure and features stepped parapets, large segmental arched openings, and thick, load-bearing masonry walls and heavy slow-burn timber posts.

It was listed on the National Register of Historic Places in 2005.
