= B. W. Canady House =

Historic house in North Carolina, United States

- U.S. National Register of Historic Places
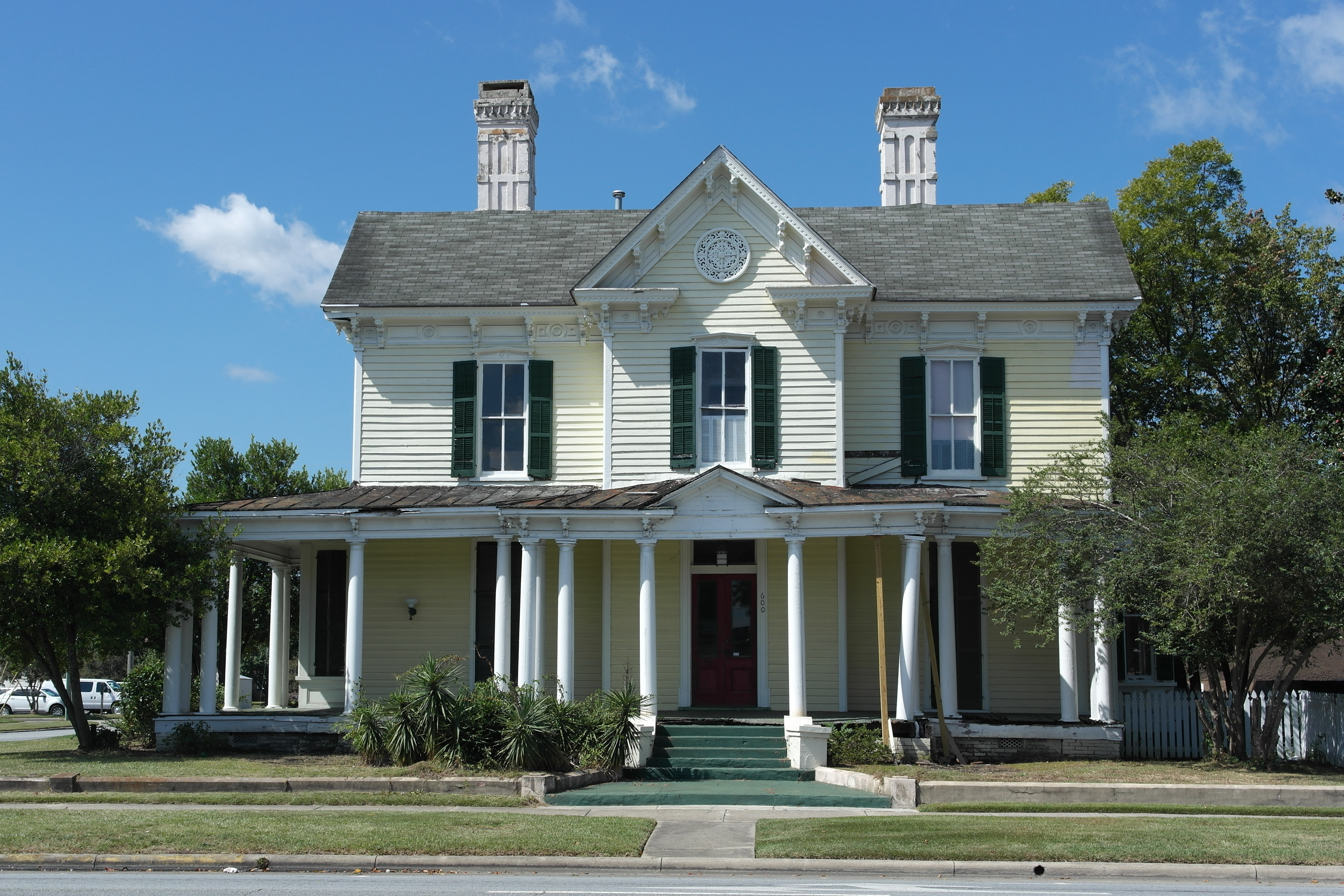
- B. W. Canady House, September 2013

- Location within North Carolina Location within the United States
- Location: 600 N. Queen St., Kinston, North Carolina
- Coordinates: 35°15′59″N 77°34′54″W
- Area: 0.5 acres (0.20 ha)
- Built: c. 1883
- Architectural style: Italianate
- MPS: Kinston MPS
- NRHP reference No.: 89001771
- Added to NRHP: November 8, 1989

B. W. Canady House is a historic home located at Kinston, Lenoir County, North Carolina. It was built about 1883, and is a two-story, L-shaped, Italianate style frame dwelling. It has a gable roof, gabled two-story projecting central entrance bay, and one-story rear wing. It features a wraparound front porch, pendant eave brackets, a paneled frieze, and tall brick interior chimneys with elaborate panelled stacks and corbelled caps.

It was listed on the National Register of Historic Places in 1989.
