= Kinston Fire Station-City Hall =

Historic building in North Carolina, US

- U.S. National Register of Historic Places
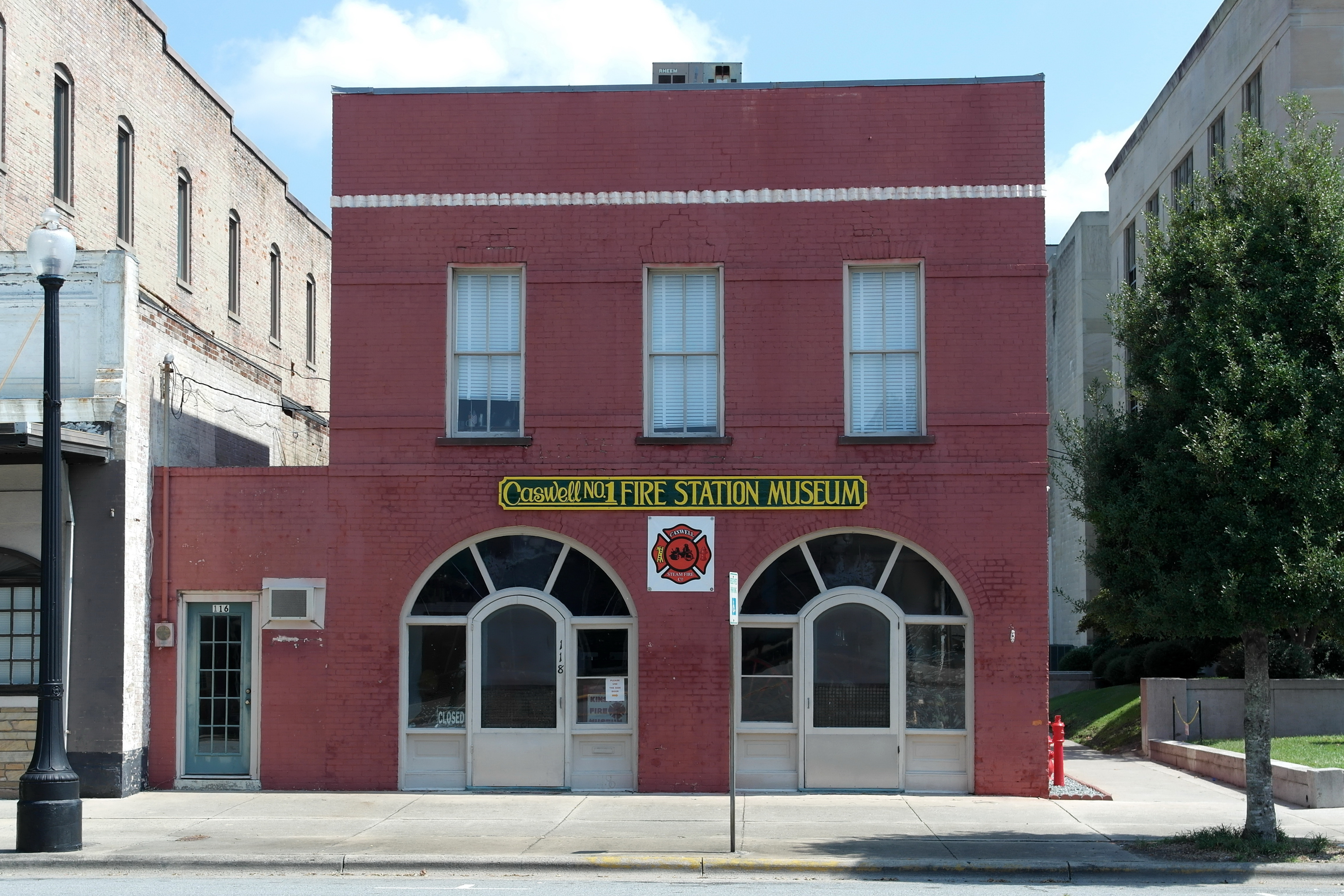
- Kinston Fire Station-City Hall, September 2013

- Location within North Carolina Location within the United States
- Location: 118 S. Queen St., Kinston, North Carolina
- Coordinates: 35°15′34″N 77°34′53″W
- Area: less than one acre
- Built: 1895
- Architectural style: Commercial style
- MPS: Kinston MPS
- NRHP reference No.: 89001769
- Added to NRHP: November 8, 1989

Kinston Fire Station-City Hall is a historic fire station and city hall located at Kinston, Lenoir County, North Carolina. It was built in 1895, and is a two-story brick structure with a two-story rear wing built in several stages. The main block has a sloping roof with raised parapet. The building was renovated in 1987. It houses the Caswell No. 1 Fire Station Museum.

It was listed on the National Register of Historic Places in 1989.
