= Mitchelltown Historic District =

Historic district in North Carolina, United States

- U.S. National Register of Historic Places
- U.S. Historic district
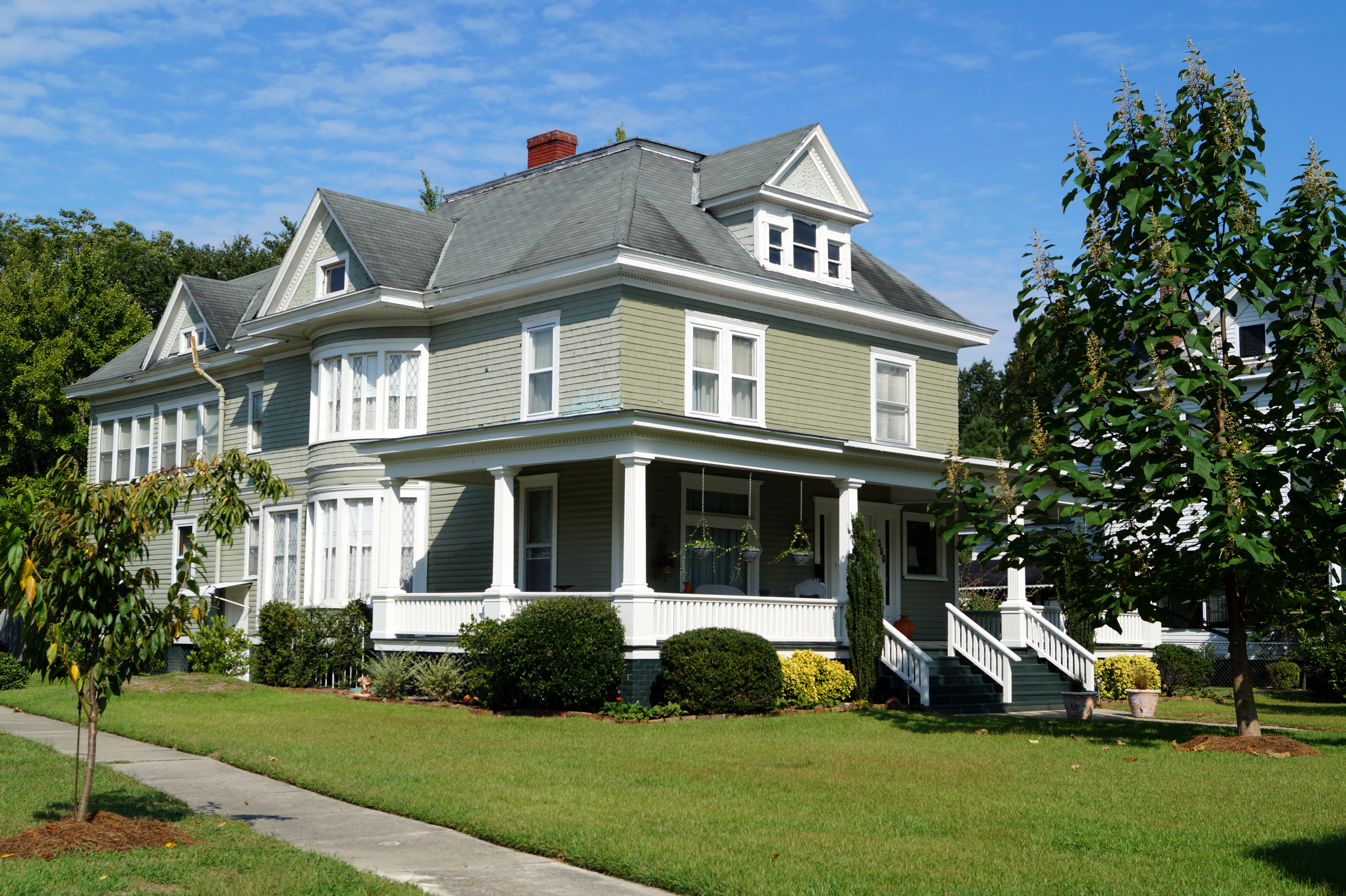
- House in the Mitchelltown Historic District, September 2014

- Location within North Carolina Location within the United States
- Location: Roughly bounded by W. Vernon Ave., N. Heritage St., W. Blount St., College St., Atlantic Ave., and Rhem St., Kinston, North Carolina
- Coordinates: 35°15′58″N 77°35′13″W
- Area: 50 acres (20 ha)
- Built: 1895
- Architectural style: Colonial Revival, Classical Revival, Bungalow/craftsman
- MPS: Kinston MPS
- NRHP reference No.: 89001766
- Added to NRHP: November 8, 1989

Mitchelltown Historic District is a national historic district located at Kinston, Lenoir County, North Carolina. It encompasses 204 contributing buildings in a predominantly residential section of Kinston. The buildings include notable examples of Colonial Revival, Classical Revival, and Bungalow / American Craftsman style architecture and date between 1885 and 1941. Notable buildings include the Adolphus Mitchell House (c. 1885), W. A. Mitchell House (c. 1905), Luther P. Tapp House (c. 1916), H. B. W. Canady House, and Robert B. Scott Bouse.

It was listed on the National Register of Historic Places in 1989.
