= Kinston, North Carolina =

- City
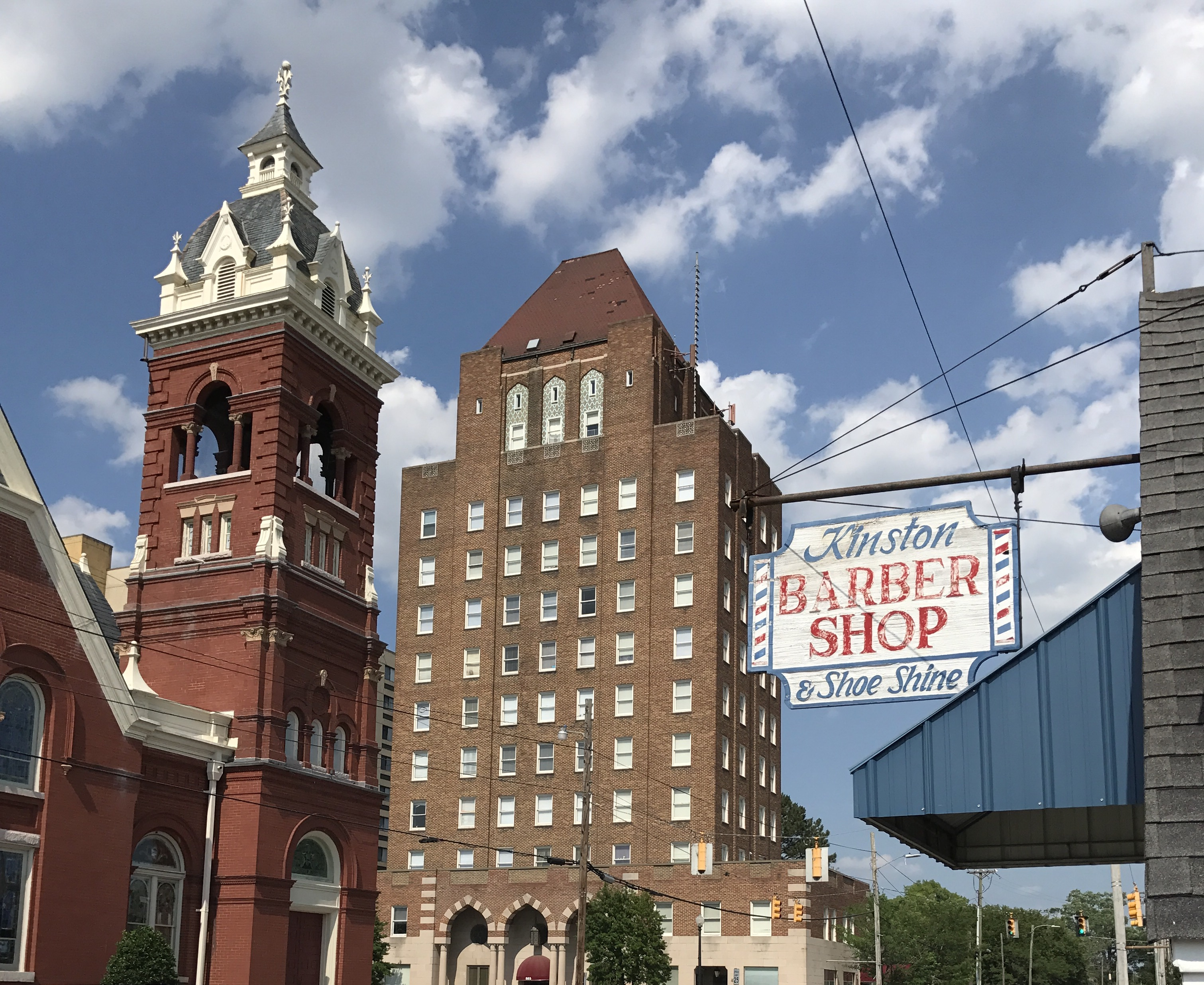
- Queen Street United Methodist Church (left) and the Hotel Kinston (center)

- Seal

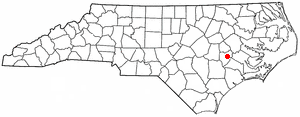
- Location of Kinston within North Carolina
- Coordinates: 35°16′29″N 77°35′37″W
- Country: United States
- State: North Carolina
- County: Lenoir

Government
  - Mayor: Dontario Hardy (D)

Area
  - Total: 18.43 sq mi (47.73 km^{2})
  - Land: 18.28 sq mi (47.34 km^{2})
  - Water: 0.15 sq mi (0.40 km^{2})
- Elevation: 82 ft (25 m)

Population (2020)
  - Total: 19,900
  - Density: 1,088.9/sq mi (420.41/km^{2})
- Time zone: UTC−5 (EST)
  - Summer (DST): UTC−4 (EDT)
- ZIP codes: 28501-28504
- Area code: 252
- FIPS code: 37-35920
- GNIS feature ID: 2404838
- Website: kinstonnc.gov

Kinston is a city in Lenoir County, North Carolina, United States, with a population of 19,900 as of the 2020 census. It has been the county seat of Lenoir County since its formation in 1791. Kinston is located in the coastal plains region of eastern North Carolina.

In 2009, Kinston won the All-America City Award. This marks the second time in 21 years the city has won the title.

== History ==
=== Early history ===
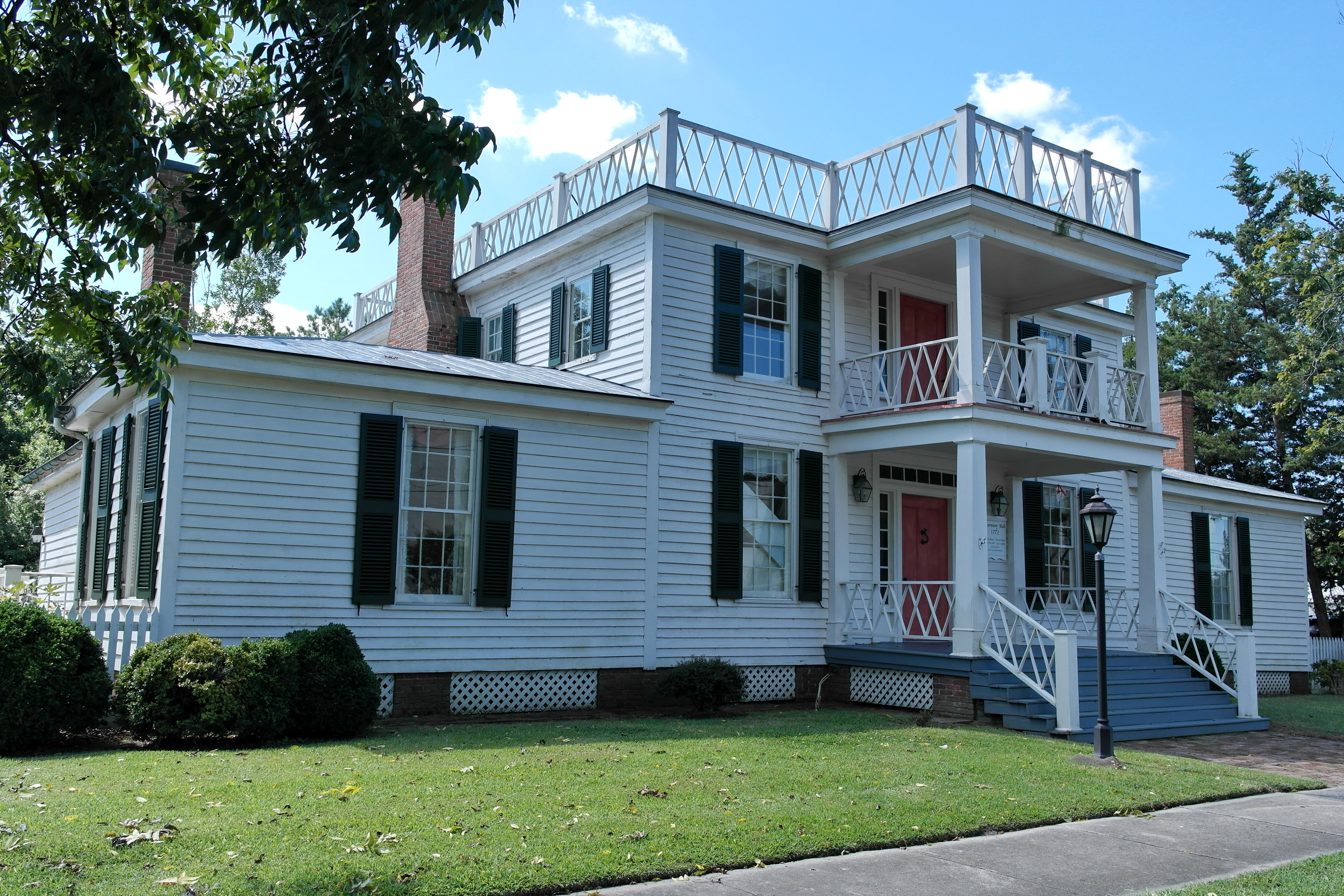
Harmony Hall, the oldest building in Kinston, was owned by North Carolina's first governor, Richard Caswell.

At the time of English settlement, the area was inhabited by the Neusiok people. Preceding the historic tribe, indigenous peoples of a variety of cultures had lived in the area for thousands of years. Before the English colonists established the city, the area was called "Atkins Bank", referring to a bluff once owned by Robert Atkins just above the Neuse River; it was the site of farms, a tobacco warehouse, and a Church of England mission.

Kinston was created by an act of the North Carolina General Assembly in December 1762 as "Kingston", in honor of King George III, who had just recently ascended to the throne. The bill to incorporate it was introduced by Richard Caswell, who made his home there and later served as the first governor of the state of North Carolina from 1776 to 1780. After victory in the American Revolution, the citizens renamed the city "Kinston" in 1784 to show the population's disavowal of royalty. In 1833, Kinston briefly became "Caswell", in honor of Governor Caswell, but the name Kinston was restored the following year.

Commissioners appointed to design the town began to accept "subscriptions" for numbered lots. To keep a lot, subscribers were required to build brick homes of specific dimensions within three years or lose their rights to the property. The town was laid out with border streets named East, North, and South, with the western border the Neuse River. The two principal roads within these borders were named for King George and Queen Charlotte. They remain King and Queen Streets to this day. Other streets were named in honor of Governor Arthur Dobbs (later renamed Independence Street) and the commissioners.

In December 1791, an act was passed in the General Assembly to abolish Dobbs County and form Lenoir and Glasgow (now Greene) Counties. At that time, Kinston was designated the county seat for Lenoir County.

Kinston was incorporated as a town through an act of the legislature in January 1849, after which the population grew rapidly. In 1850, the population was estimated at 455 people, and just 10 years later, it had more than doubled to over 1000.

=== Civil War ===
During the onset of the Civil War, Camp Campbell and Camp Johnston were established near the city as training camps, and a bakery on Queen Street was converted to produce hardtack in large quantities. Also, a factory for the production of shoes for the military was located in Kinston. The Battle of Kinston took place in and around the city on December 14, 1862.

From February 5 to February 22, 1864, 22 Union soldiers of the 2nd North Carolina Union Volunteer Infantry Regiment were executed by hanging in the city. These men had been captured in the Battle of New Bern by Confederate troops, and were found to have previously served in North Carolina Partisan Ranger units. General George Pickett ordered that they should be court martialed for desertion from the Confederate Army, and the subsequent hangings were carried out by the 54th Regiment, North Carolina Troops, under the command of General Robert Hoke. Fifteen of these men were from Jones County, and had all started their service in the 8th Battalion North Carolina Partisan Rangers.

The Battle of Wyse Fork, also known as the Battle of Southwest Creek (March 7–10, 1865), took place near the city. At this later battle, the Confederate ram Neuse was scuttled to avoid capture by Union troops. Remnants of the ship have been salvaged, and were on display at Richard Caswell Park on West Vernon Avenue. A climate-controlled museum has been built on downtown Queen Street, and has moved the hulk there to prevent further deterioration of the original ship's remains. A full-scale replica vessel (Ram Neuse II) has been constructed near the original's resting place (known as the "Cat's Hole") beside the bank of the Neuse River on Heritage Street in Kinston. Union Army forces occupied the city following the battle. United States troops were assigned to the area through the Reconstruction era.

=== After Reconstruction ===
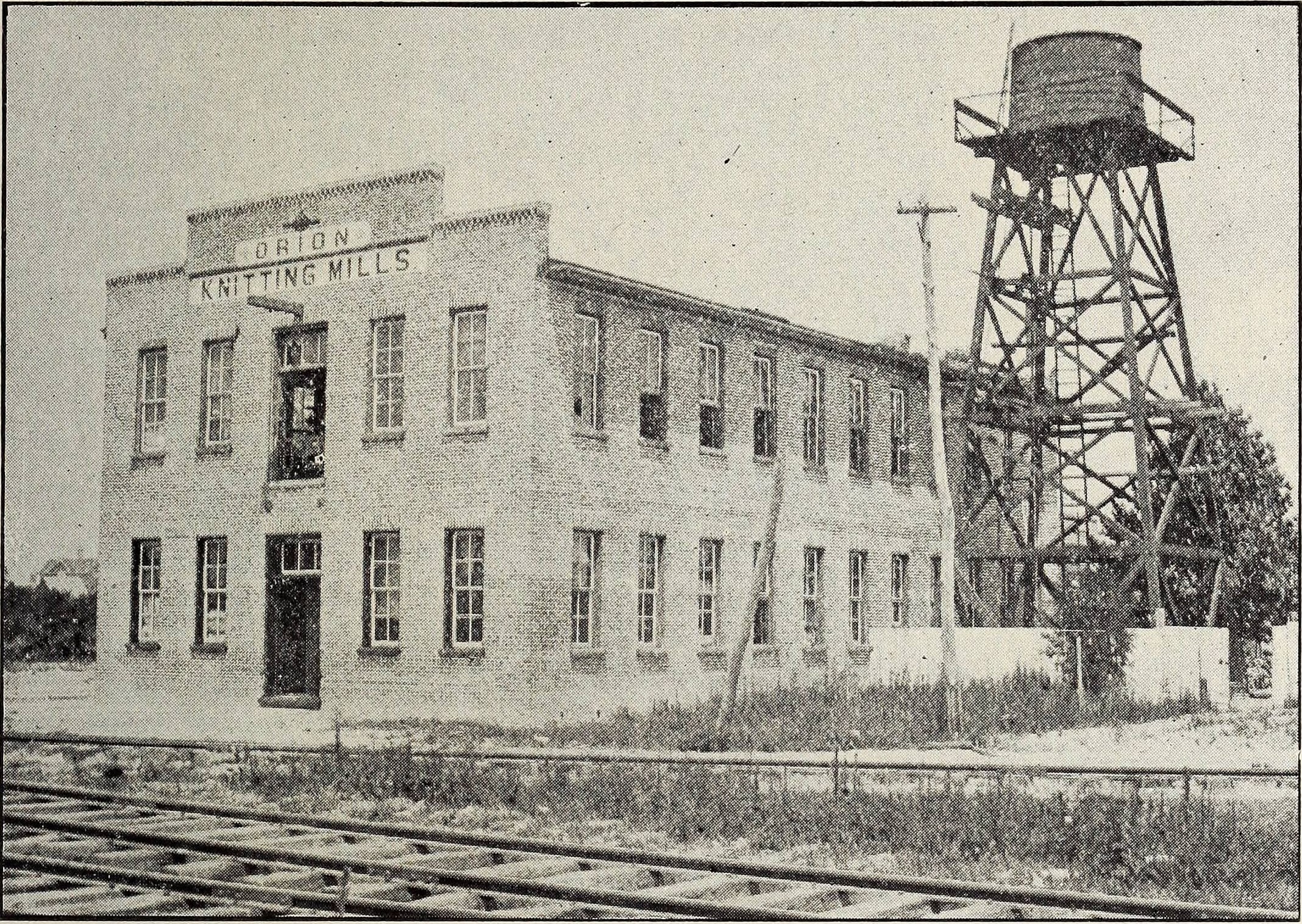
Kinston's Orion Knitting Mills (1906)

Despite the hardships of war and Reconstruction, the population of the city continued to grow. By 1870, the population had increased to 1,100 people and grew to more than 1,700 within a decade.

During the late 19th century, an expansion into new areas of industry occurred, most notably the production of horse-drawn carriages. Kinston also became a major tobacco- and cotton-trading center. By the start of the 20th century, more than 5 million pounds of tobacco were being sold annually in Kinston's warehouses. Along with the growth in population and industry came a growth in property values. Some parcels increased in value more than five-fold within a 20-year period.

On April 6, 1916, Joseph Black was taken from the Lenoir County Jail and lynched by a mob of armed men. He was accused of assisting his son in an escape attempt.

=== 20th century ===
New industries were founded, including lumber and cotton mills, as North Carolina businessmen invested in processing their own crops. Professional sports were introduced in the form of a minor league baseball team. Later growth came from a DuPont plant for the manufacture of polyester fibers, and manufacturing plants for pharmaceuticals. Growth finally slowed following the 1960s, with the shift in textile production overseas. Efforts to reinvigorate the economy through various means have had limited success.

Kinston was heavily impacted by flooding in 1996 and 1999. Hurricane Fran struck the North Carolina coast on September 5, 1996, and brought 16 inches (410 mm) of rain to the area, causing the Neuse River to flood portions of the city. On September 16, 1999, Hurricane Floyd struck the area, bringing 17 inches (430 mm) of rain. It caused what locals have called a flood of the century.

The National Register of Historic Places lists these Kinston sites: American Tobacco Company Prizery, Atlantic and North Carolina Railroad Freight Depot, Baptist Parsonage, Robert L. Blalock House, B. W. Canady House, CSS Neuse, Hill-Grainger Historic District, Hotel Kinston, Jesse Jackson House, Kennedy Memorial Home Historic District, Kinston Apartments, Kinston Baptist-White Rock Presbyterian Church, Kinston Battlefield, Kinston Commercial Historic District, Kinston Fire Station-City Hall, Lenoir County Courthouse, Mitchelltown Historic District, Peebles House, Peoples Bank Building, Queen-Gordon Streets Historic District, Standard Drug No. 2, Sumrell and McCoy Building, Trianon Historic District, Tull-Worth-Holland Farm, and Dempsey Wood House.

== Geography ==
Kinston is in the Atlantic coastal plain region of North Carolina. It is mainly on the northeast side of the Neuse River, and is northeast of the center of Lenoir County. It is 26 miles (42 km) east of Goldsboro, 30 miles (48 km) south of Greenville, and 35 miles (56 km) west of New Bern. The Atlantic Ocean at Emerald Isle is 57 miles (92 km) to the southeast, and Raleigh, the state capital, is 80 miles (130 km) to the northwest.

According to the U.S. Census Bureau, the city of Kinston has a total area of 18.6 sq mi (48.1 km^{2}), of which 0.2 sq mi (0.5 km^{2}), or 0.95%, is covered by water.

=== Climate ===
According to the Köppen climate classification, Kinston has a humid subtropical climate, Cfa on climate maps. The hottest temperature recorded in Kinston was 103 °F (39.4 °C) on July 20, 1977, and August 20–22, 1983, while the coldest temperature recorded was −2 °F (−18.9 °C) on January 21, 1985.

Climate data for Kinston, North Carolina, 1991–2020 normals, extremes 1966–present
Month	Jan	Feb	Mar	Apr	May	Jun	Jul	Aug	Sep	Oct	Nov	Dec	Year
Record high °F (°C)	80 (27)	84 (29)	89 (32)	95 (35)	100 (38)	101 (38)	103 (39)	103 (39)	102 (39)	96 (36)	87 (31)	83 (28)	103 (39)
Mean maximum °F (°C)	74.1 (23.4)	75.9 (24.4)	82.2 (27.9)	86.9 (30.5)	92.3 (33.5)	96.1 (35.6)	97.4 (36.3)	96.0 (35.6)	92.2 (33.4)	87.1 (30.6)	80.7 (27.1)	74.6 (23.7)	98.6 (37.0)
Mean daily maximum °F (°C)	56.1 (13.4)	60.0 (15.6)	66.7 (19.3)	75.4 (24.1)	82.0 (27.8)	87.9 (31.1)	90.6 (32.6)	88.8 (31.6)	83.8 (28.8)	76.0 (24.4)	66.7 (19.3)	58.9 (14.9)	74.4 (23.6)
Daily mean °F (°C)	45.7 (7.6)	48.4 (9.1)	54.5 (12.5)	63.4 (17.4)	70.7 (21.5)	77.7 (25.4)	81.0 (27.2)	79.2 (26.2)	74.0 (23.3)	64.6 (18.1)	55.2 (12.9)	48.5 (9.2)	63.6 (17.5)
Mean daily minimum °F (°C)	35.3 (1.8)	36.8 (2.7)	42.4 (5.8)	51.3 (10.7)	59.5 (15.3)	67.6 (19.8)	71.4 (21.9)	69.6 (20.9)	64.2 (17.9)	53.1 (11.7)	43.8 (6.6)	38.0 (3.3)	52.7 (11.5)
Mean minimum °F (°C)	16.7 (−8.5)	21.2 (−6.0)	25.0 (−3.9)	33.9 (1.1)	44.6 (7.0)	55.2 (12.9)	62.3 (16.8)	60.0 (15.6)	51.7 (10.9)	36.4 (2.4)	27.0 (−2.8)	22.5 (−5.3)	14.9 (−9.5)
Record low °F (°C)	−2 (−19)	3 (−16)	8 (−13)	24 (−4)	25 (−4)	42 (6)	52 (11)	47 (8)	38 (3)	24 (−4)	17 (−8)	6 (−14)	−2 (−19)
Average precipitation inches (mm)	3.74 (95)	3.20 (81)	3.84 (98)	3.53 (90)	3.92 (100)	5.53 (140)	5.79 (147)	6.36 (162)	6.64 (169)	3.56 (90)	3.46 (88)	3.29 (84)	52.86 (1,344)
Average snowfall inches (cm)	0.3 (0.76)	0.1 (0.25)	0.0 (0.0)	0.0 (0.0)	0.0 (0.0)	0.0 (0.0)	0.0 (0.0)	0.0 (0.0)	0.0 (0.0)	0.0 (0.0)	0.0 (0.0)	0.3 (0.76)	0.7 (1.77)
Average precipitation days (≥ 0.01 in)	8.3	7.7	8.2	7.4	8.1	9.3	11.0	10.1	8.1	6.3	7.2	8.1	99.8
Average snowy days (≥ 0.1 in)	0.1	0.0	0.0	0.0	0.0	0.0	0.0	0.0	0.0	0.0	0.0	0.0	0.1
Source 1: NOAA
Source 2: National Weather Service

== Demographics ==
Historical population
Census	Pop.	Note	%±
1850	455		—
1860	1,333		193.0%
1870	1,103		−17.3%
1880	1,216		10.2%
1890	1,726		41.9%
1900	4,106		137.9%
1910	6,995		70.4%
1920	9,771		39.7%
1930	11,362		16.3%
1940	15,388		35.4%
1950	18,336		19.2%
1960	24,819		35.4%
1970	23,020		−7.2%
1980	25,234		9.6%
1990	25,295		0.2%
2000	23,688		−6.4%
2010	21,677		−8.5%
2020	19,900		−8.2%
U.S. Decennial Census

=== Racial and ethnic composition ===
Kinston city, North Carolina – Racial and ethnic composition Note: the US Census treats Hispanic/Latino as an ethnic category. This table excludes Latinos from the racial categories and assigns them to a separate category. Hispanics/Latinos may be of any race.
Race / Ethnicity (NH = Non-Hispanic)	Pop 2000	Pop 2010	Pop 2020	% 2000	% 2010	% 2020
White alone (NH)	8,290	6,022	4,854	35.00%	27.78%	24.39%
Black or African American alone (NH)	14,792	14,673	13,615	62.45%	67.69%	68.42%
Native American or Alaska Native alone (NH)	36	41	33	0.15%	0.19%	0.17%
Asian alone (NH)	133	146	208	0.56%	0.67%	1.05%
Native Hawaiian or Pacific Islander alone (NH)	11	12	10	0.05%	0.06%	0.05%
Other race alone (NH)	23	28	50	0.10%	0.13%	0.25%
Mixed race or Multiracial (NH)	134	243	527	0.57%	1.12%	2.65%
Hispanic or Latino (any race)	269	512	603	1.14%	2.36%	3.03%
Total	23,688	21,677	19,900	100.00%	100.00%	100.00%

=== 2020 census ===
As of the 2020 census, Kinston had a population of 19,900 and 8,677 households, of which 5,050 were families. The median age was 43.5 years; 22.2% of residents were under the age of 18 and 22.4% of residents were 65 years of age or older. For every 100 females there were 84.3 males, and for every 100 females age 18 and over there were 79.4 males age 18 and over.

97.2% of residents lived in urban areas, while 2.8% lived in rural areas.

Of the 8,677 households, 26.1% had children under the age of 18 living in them. Of all households, 26.0% were married-couple households, 21.6% were households with a male householder and no spouse or partner present, and 47.4% were households with a female householder and no spouse or partner present. About 39.2% of all households were made up of individuals and 17.8% had someone living alone who was 65 years of age or older.

There were 10,476 housing units, of which 17.2% were vacant. The homeowner vacancy rate was 3.1% and the rental vacancy rate was 6.4%.

Racial composition as of the 2020 census
Race	Number	Percent
White	4,920	24.7%
Black or African American	13,721	68.9%
American Indian and Alaska Native	46	0.2%
Asian	208	1.0%
Native Hawaiian and Other Pacific Islander	11	0.1%
Some other race	259	1.3%
Two or more races	735	3.7%

=== 2010 census ===
As of the 2010 United States census, 21,677 people were living in the city. The racial makeup of the city was 67.7% Black, 27.8% White, 0.2% Native American, 0.7% Asian, 0.1% Pacific Islander, 0.1% from some other race, and 1.1% from two or more races. About 2.4% were Hispanics or Latinos of any race.

=== 2000 census ===
As of the census of 2000, 23,688 people, 9,829 households, and 6,074 families were living in the city. The population density was 1,415.7 people/sq mi (546.7/km^{2}). The 11,229 housing units averaged 671.1/sq mi (259.1/km^{2}). The racial makeup of the city was 35.27% White, 62.64% African American, 0.16% Native American, 0.57% Asian, 1.1% from other races, and 0.67% from two or more races. Hispanics or Latinos of any race were 1.14% of the population.

Of the 9,829 households, 28.0% had children under 18 living with them, 35.7% were married couples living together, 22.7% had a female householder with no husband present, and 38.2% were not families. About 34.5% of all households were made up of individuals, and 16.4% had someone living alone who was 65 or older. The average household size was 2.29, and the average family size was 2.94.

In the city, the age distribution was 24.4% under 18, 7.3% from 18 to 24, 24.9% from 25 to 44, 24.5% from 45 to 64, and 18.9% who were 65 or older. The median age was 41 years. For every 100 females, there were 81.8 males. For every 100 females 18 and over, there were 74.6 males.

The median income for a household in the city was $26,630, and for a family was $35,867. Males had a median income of $28,688 versus $21,442 for females. The per capita income for the city was $17,779. About 19.7% of families and 23.0% of the population were below the poverty line, including 32.0% of those under age 18 and 18.9% of those age 65 or over.

== Government and infrastructure ==
The North Carolina Department of Public Safety (earlier the North Carolina Department of Juvenile Justice and Delinquency Prevention) operates the Dobbs Youth Development Center juvenile correctional facility in Kinston. The facility, which opened in 1944, has a prisoner capacity of 44.

In the 2017 municipal elections, Democratic candidate Dontario Hardy beat incumbent B.J. Murphy by a margin of 205 votes. City Councilman Robert A. Swinson IV was re-elected alongside newcomer Kristal Suggs, completing Kinston's first ever all African-American city council.

== Infrastructure ==
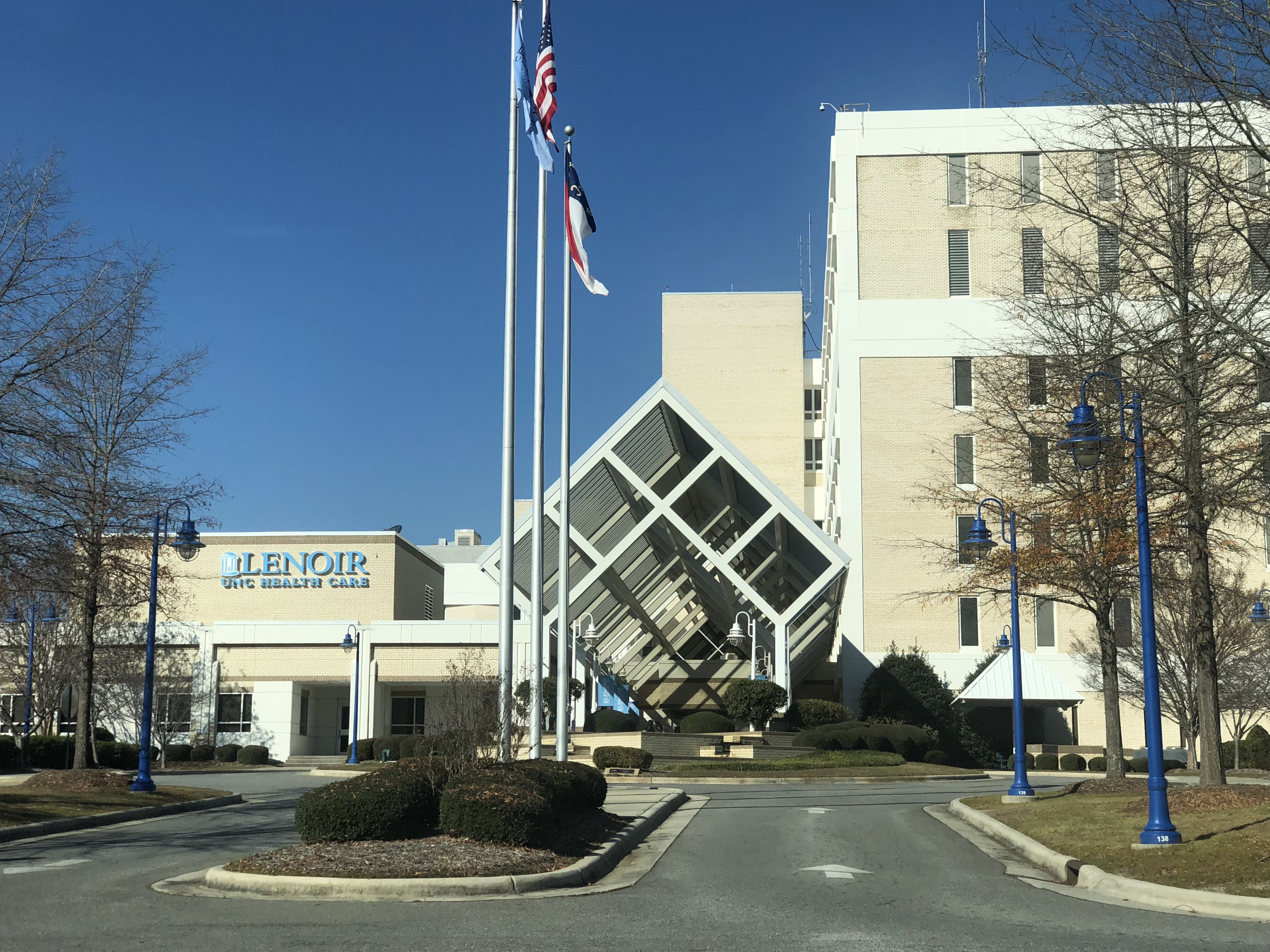
UNC Lenoir Health Care

=== Health care ===
Kinston is served by UNC Lenoir Health Care, a nonprofit hospital located near NC 11 in Kinston. The hospital offers inpatient, outpatient and preventive healthcare services for the residents of Lenoir, Greene and Jones counties. General services include general medical, surgical, obstetrical, and gynecological care. Specialized services include cardiology, pulmonology, oncology, radiology, urology, and vascular surgery.

=== Transportation ===
==== Passenger ====
Kinston is not served directly by passenger trains. The closest Amtrak station is 40 miles (64 km) to the northwest in Wilson.

==== Air ====
Kinston is served by the Kinston Regional Jetport (IATA: ISO, ICAO: KISO). From here, Bill Harrelson of Fredericksburg, Virginia, left and returned on his Guinness world record-setting "around-the-globe-over-the-poles" flight in his custom-built Lancair N6ZQ, between December 2014 and January 2015.

Raleigh–Durham International Airport is the closest major airport, 96 miles (154 km) northwest of Kinston, with service to more than 45 domestic and international destinations.

==== Road ====
- The main highway in Kinston is US 70, an east–west highway that provides access to the North Carolina coast and major cities to the west, such as Raleigh and Greensboro and I-95.
- I-795 is the closest interstate highway to Kinston, crossing US-70 in Goldsboro.
- Other highways that serve Kinston include US 258, NC 11, NC 58, NC 55, and NC 148.

Intercity bus service to Kinston is provided by Greyhound.

== Religion ==
As with most of North Carolina, Kinston is predominantly Protestant with large concentrations of Baptists, Methodists, and various other evangelical groups. Episcopalians, Presbyterians, and Disciples of Christ also constitute a significant portion of the population.

The Roman Catholic community in Kinston has seen steady growth over the years with the migration of Hispanic workers to the area. Catholic migrants have also come from the Northeastern United States who work for the North Carolina Global TransPark and in nearby Greenville.

Kinston at one time had a sizeable Jewish community. As with most Jewish communities in the rural South, it has seen a steady decline. Temple Israel, Kinston's only synagogue, has a few remaining members.

== Education ==
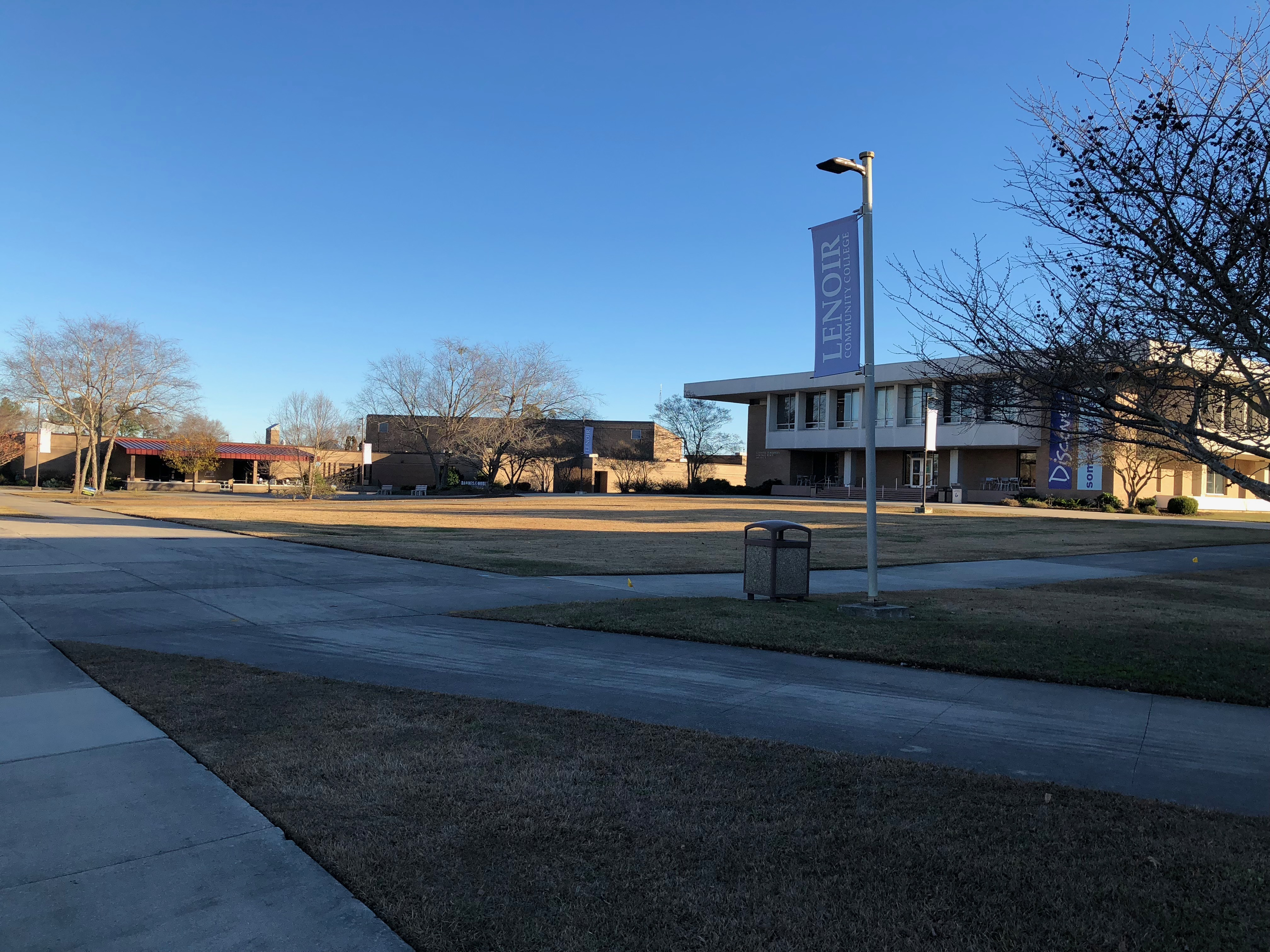
Lenoir Community College's library and student center

=== Public college ===
- Lenoir Community College

=== Private college ===
- United American Free Will Baptist Bible College

=== Public schools ===
- Kinston High School
- Lenoir County Early College
- North Lenoir High School
- South Lenoir High School
- Contentnea-Savannah School
- Children's Village Academy
- Rochelle Middle School
- Woodington Middle School
- Banks Elementary School
- Northwest Elementary School
- Moss Hill Elementary School
- Southeast Elementary School
- Southwood Elementary School
- Northeast Elementary School

=== Private schools ===
- Arendell Parrott Academy, a nonsectarian private school (kindergarten-grade 12)
- Bethel Christian Academy, a Christian private school (kindergarten-grade 12)

== Culture ==
=== Arts and theater ===
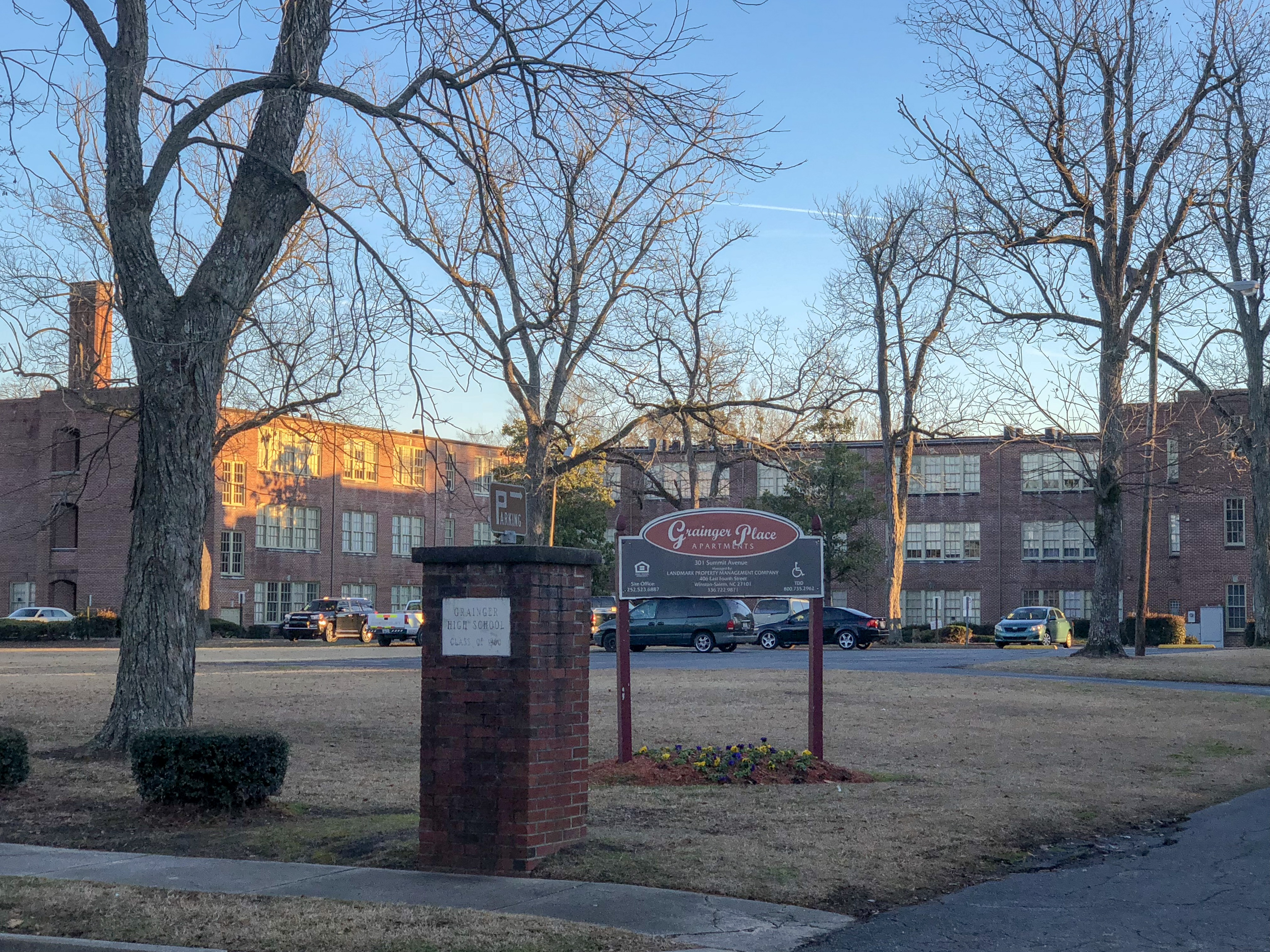
Former Grainger Performing Arts Center, now Grainger Elderly Housing

One of Kinston's most notable buildings is the Grainger Hill Performing Arts Center, formerly Grainger High School. Constructed in 1924 after a fire destroyed the previous Kinston High School building, the school was named after Jesse W. Grainger, a local truck farmer who owned the land that the school was built upon and donated money to fund one-half of the building's $182,340 general contractor's fee. After the decision in 1970 to make way for the newly constructed and integrated Kinston High School, it served as Kinston Jr. High School until 1987 (when ninth-grade students were moved to the campus of Kinston High School and eighth-grade students were relocated to the campus of Rochelle Middle School). After the school's closure, the building was sold to a private developer, who renovated the school and turned it into a performing arts center. The property was most recently sold to the Landmark Development Group, which renovated the building into Grainger Elderly Housing, a 57-unit apartment complex for low-income elderly residents.

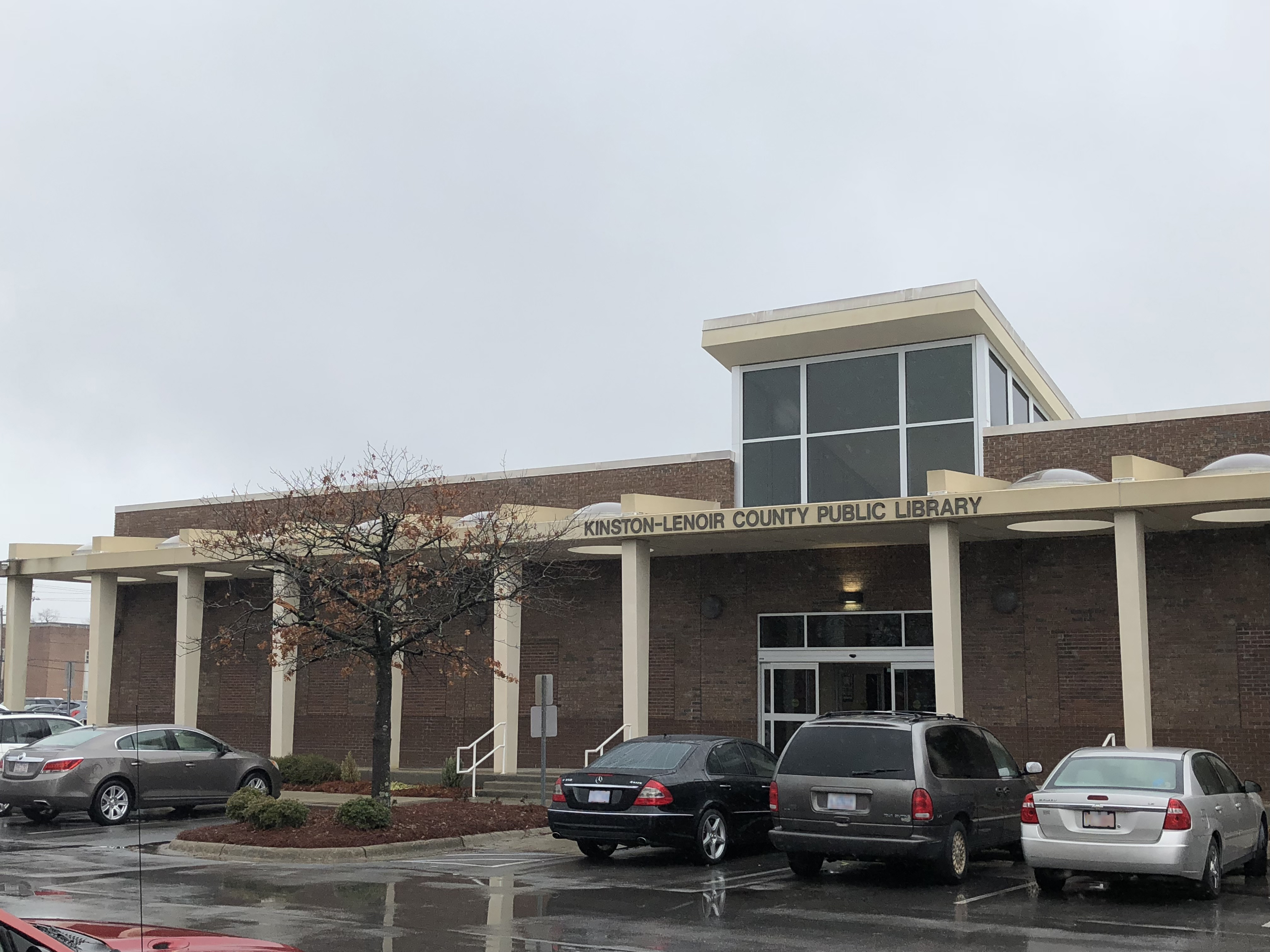
Kinston-Lenoir County Public Library

=== Tourism and recreation ===
The Neuse Regional Library system is headquartered in Kinston and operates branches in Kinston, LaGrange, and Pink Hill, as well as locations in Greene and Jones Counties.

Kinston is home to the CSS Neuse, which is listed on the National Register of Historic Places. Its remains are on display in the CSS Neuse Civil War Interpretive Center. The Lenoir County Confederate Memorial, the Caswell family cemetery, and the Lenoir County Korean and Vietnam War Memorial are located nearby. There is also a Civil War Trails marker.

The Cultural Heritage Museum, built in 2000 on South Queen Street as a new economic development catalyst for Kinston and the surrounding areas of eastern North Carolina, was created to recognize the contributions of African Americans in numerous fields. It pays tribute to the more than 200,000 Black soldiers and 7,000 White officers of the United States Colored Troops who fought with the Union forces in the Civil War. It also honors Black military veterans from all wars, Carl Long and the Negro Baseball League players, local heroes, and Africa and Black history in general. The museum intends to generate jobs and promote economic expansion opportunities.

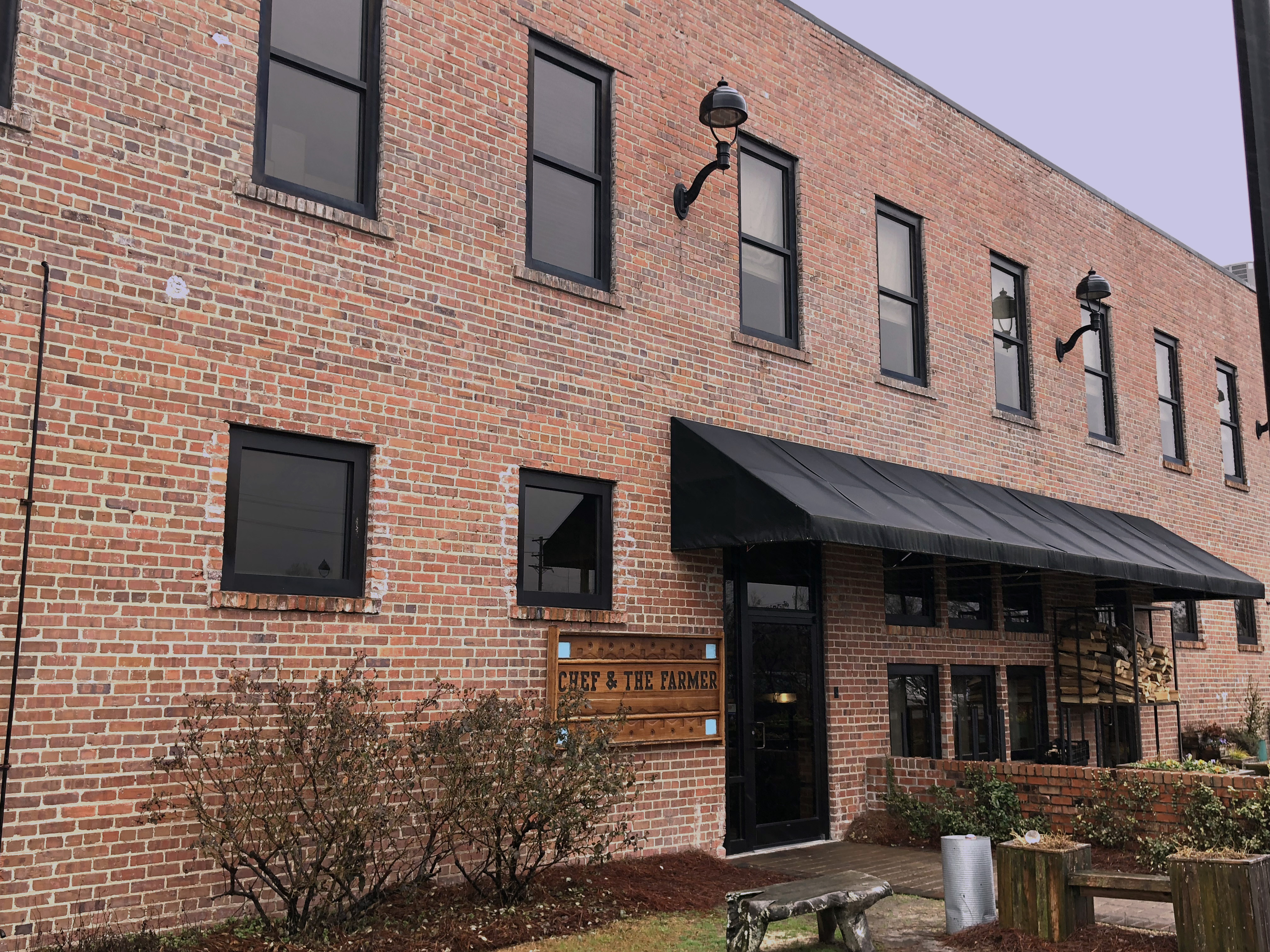
Chef & the Farmer

Kinston is home to several notable restaurants. The Chef & the Farmer, recipient of a James Beard Award, started by Vivian Howard and Ben Knight, is located in downtown Kinston. The PBS series A Chef's Life focuses on the restaurant, owners, and local farmers from whom it sources. Also a proponent of sustainable practices and local ingredients, Mother Earth Brewing was founded in Kinston in the summer of 2008.

Other local attractions include the Neuseway Nature Center and Planetarium, the Kinston Center for the Arts, the Global Transit Park (GTP), Grainger Stadium, the Caswell Center, and Lenoir Memorial Hospital.

Annual festivities in Kinston include the Sand in the Streets concert series held at Pearson Park, the Annual BBQ Festival on the Neuse River, and the Festival on the Neuse.

== Sports ==
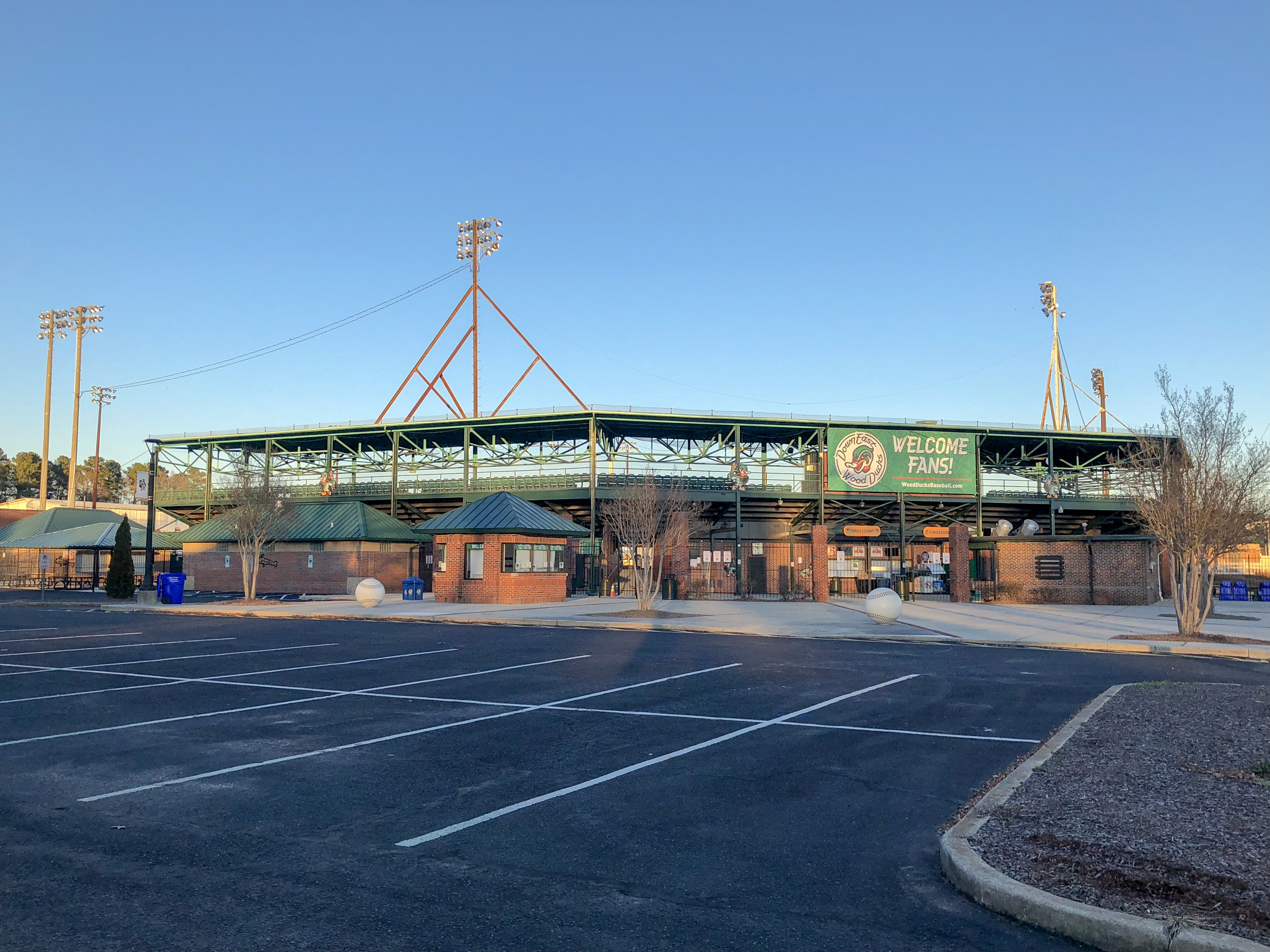
Grainger Stadium parking lot & exterior

Kinston's Grainger Stadium is currently the home to the Down East Bird Dawgs of the Frontier League (FL). It was previously home to the Kinston Indians minor league baseball team, as well as youth and college level baseball tournaments. The town first hosted professional baseball in 1908 and among the many alumni is Rick Ferrell, who was inducted into the Baseball Hall of Fame, Manny Ramirez, and Lonnie Chisenhall.

The Kinston Drag Strip hosts a variety of motor-sports events throughout the year. Kinston also has three golf courses: Kinston Country Club, Falling Creek Country Club, and Bill Fay Park Par 3 Golf Course. Barnet Park is home to a disc golf course. The Galaxy of Sports recreational facility includes a bowling alley, skating rink, and health club.

In 2012, Woodmen of the World constructed the Woodmen of the World Community Center and Lions Water Adventure Park, a 53,000 ft^{2} (4,900 m^{2}) facility that offers a cardio and strength-training center, an Olympic-sized swimming pool, several corporate reception areas, and conference rooms, as well as a quarter-mile elevated track and several sporting courts. The center is now owned by the city of Kinston and is called the Kinston Community Center.

In 1956, Kinston was the site of a rare, perfect game of billiards, as Willie Mosconi sank 150 balls in a row in one inning against Jimmy Moore.

In 2018, ESPN called Kinston "America's Basketball Heaven". According to the ESPN article, one in 52.7 players on Kinston High School's varsity team makes the NBA.

=== Parks and recreation ===
- Neuseway Nature Park, Campground, and Meeting Facility
- Pearson Park
- Bill Fay Memorial Park
- Emma Webb Park
- Fairfield Park
- Holloway Park
- Lovit Hines Park
- Southeast Park
- Barnet Park
- Lions Adventure Water Park

== Notable people ==
- Larry Beck, professional golfer
- Jocelyn Brown, singer
- James Tim Brymn, jazz musician
- Reggie Bullock, NBA player
- Carter Capps, All-America baseball player at Mt. Olive College and MLB relief pitcher
- William Caswell, Revolutionary War general
- Dwight Clark, NFL receiver for San Francisco 49ers, noted for "The Catch"
- Quinton Coples, professional football player
- Steve Cowper, governor of Alaska
- Richard Cray, singer
- Tony Dawson, NBA player
- Ed Grady, actor
- Susannah Sarah Washington Graham, First Lady of North Carolina
- Chris Hatcher, MLB pitcher
- Malcolm Howard, federal judge
- Vivian Howard, chef
- Brandon Ingram, NBA player for the Toronto Raptors
- Cedric "Cornbread" Maxwell, NBA player
- Richard McCoy Jr., aircraft hijacker
- Mitchell's Christian Singers, gospel group
- Robert "Brother Ah" Northern, jazz musician, educator, radio host
- Susan Owens, Washington State Supreme Court justice
- Maceo Parker, musician
- Melvin Parker, drummer
- Marion A. Parrott, lawyer, activist
- Jaime Pressly, actress, model
- Barbara Roy, singer
- Ted Sampley, Vietnam veteran and POW-MIA activist
- Christa Sauls, actress, model
- Charles Shackleford, NBA player
- J. Carlyle Sitterson, educator
- Tab Smith, swing saxophonist
- Frank Snepp, journalist
- Jerry Stackhouse, NBA player
- George Suggs, MLB pitcher
- Ola B. Watford, geophysicist
- Mitchell Wiggins, NBA player
- Tyrone Willingham, college football coach

== See also ==
- West Pharmaceutical Services explosion
