= Lilly Hartley =

American actress

- Occupations: Founder & creative producer, Candescent Films
- Years active: 2000–present
- Website: candescentfilms.com

Lilly Hartley is an American documentary film producer and actress, and the founder of Candescent Films.

== Early life and education ==
Hartley was raised in East Hampton, New York, and New York City. Her father is a playwright and graduate of the Yale School of Drama, and her mother is a scientist. Her godfather, Ken Howard, was an actor and was president of the Screen Actors Guild. Her grandfather, Benjamin Epstein, worked with Martin Luther King Jr. and Robert F. Kennedy during the Civil Rights Movement in his role as national director of the Anti-Defamation League. She majored in history and English in college and graduated summa cum laude. She studied acting at William Esper Studio, completing the two-year program.

== Career ==
Hartley founded Candescent Films in 2010. The film production company supports documentary films exploring social issues. Prior to founding the company, Hartley worked as an actress and production executive. She is a member of the Screen Actors Guild and Producers Guild of America.

The first film supported by Candescent was The Queen of Versailles, which was the opening night film at the 2012 Sundance Film Festival, and was nominated for a DGA Award, IDA Award and Critics' Choice Award. Hartley served as an executive producer. As a producer on Sons of the Clouds, a documentary exploring human rights issues in Western Sahara and starring Javier Bardem, Hartley won the 2013 Goya Award for Best Documentary Film. In 2014, Hartley partnered with the Tribeca Film Institute to develop a Candescent Award for films that premiere at the Tribeca Film Festival. The inaugural recipient of this award was Nas: Time Is Illmatic (2014).

Some of Hartley's other work includes executive producing Who Is Dayani Cristal? starring Gael García Bernal, executive producing Private Violence, which premiered at the 2014 Sundance Film Festival, and producing Likeness, a short film starring Elle Fanning and directed by Rodrigo Prieto. Hartley executive produced The Departure, directed by Lana Wilson. Hartley executive produced the big game hunting documentary Trophy, which premiered at the 2017 Sundance Film Festival, where it was acquired by CNN Films and The Orchard. Hartley also executive produced Generation Wealth.

== Filmography ==
Year	Title	Credited as	Notes
2010	Dirty Girl	Associate producer	
2010	An Invisible Sign	Associate producer	
2012	The Queen of Versailles	Co-executive producer	Nominated for DGA Award, IDA Award and Critics' Choice Award
2012	Sons of the Clouds	Producer	Won 2013 Goya Award for Best Documentary Film
2013	Who Is Dayani Cristal?	Executive producer	
2013	Remote Area Medical	Executive producer	
2013	Likeness	Producer	Short film; nominated for Webby Award
2014	Private Violence	Executive producer	Won Candescent Award; nominated for Primetime Emmy Award for Outstanding Informational Programming – Long Form
2014	1971	Co-executive producer	Won 2015 International Documentary Association ABCNews VideoSource Award and 2015 Cinema Eye Honors Spotlight Award. Named a 2016 Peabody Award finalist.
2017	The Departure	Executive producer	Nominated for 2017 Independent Spirit Award for Best Documentary Feature
2017	Trophy	Executive producer	
2018	Generation Wealth	Executive producer	Nominated for 2018 WGA Award for Best Documentary Screenplay
2019	Fantasy Island	Executive producer	
