= Jeffrey Tarrant =

American investor and film producer (1956–2019)

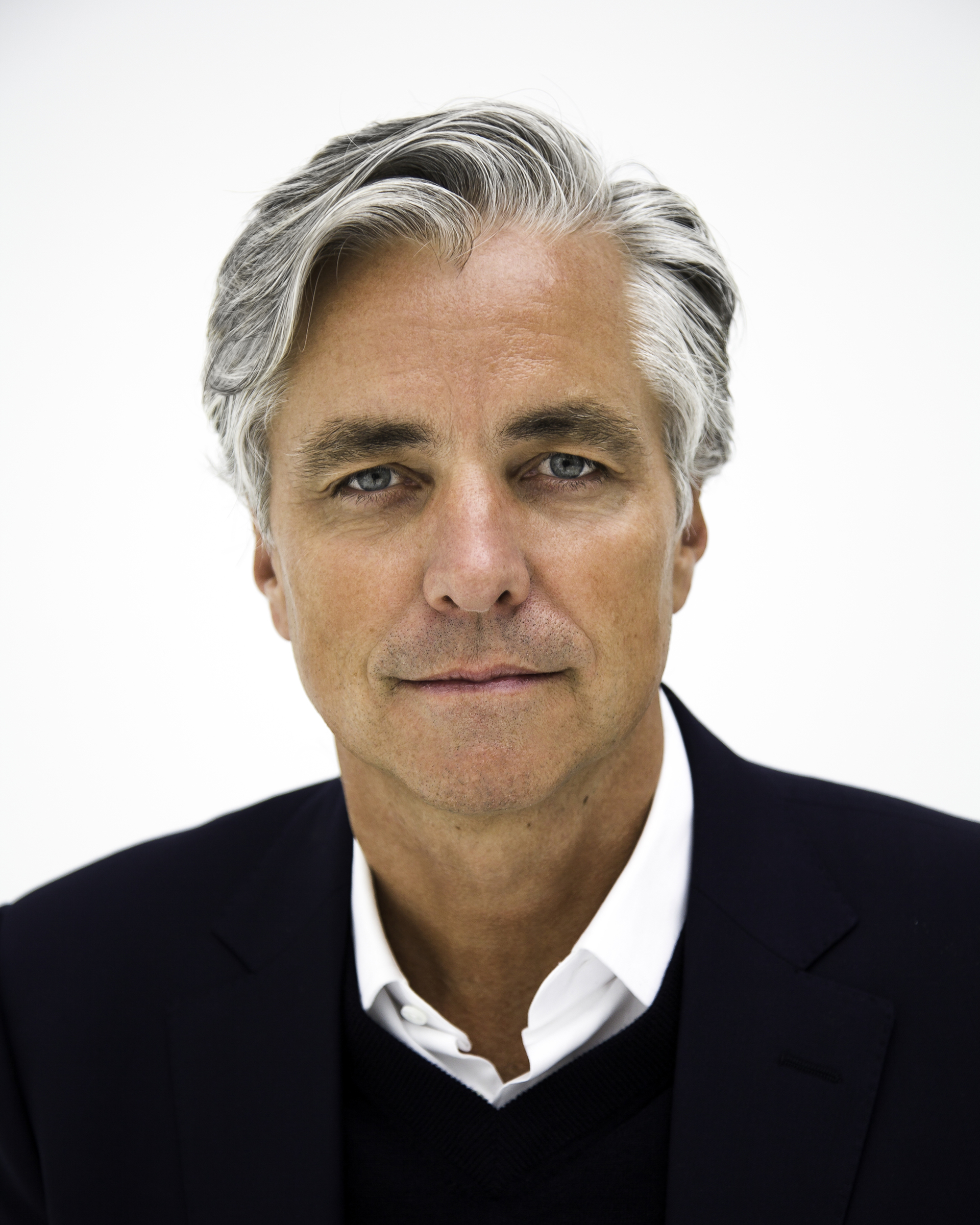
- Born: April 4, 1956; Stockton, California, U.S.
- Died: August 5, 2019 (aged 63); Bridgehampton, New York, U.S.
- Education: University of California, Davis (BA, 1978); Harvard Business School (MBA, 1985)
- Occupations: Founder, Altvest (1996-00); Founder & Chairman, Protégé Partners (2001-present); Founding partner, Candescent Films (2010-present) Founder & Chairman, MOV37 (2017-present)
- Years active: 1986–2019
- Website: mov37.com

Jeffrey Glynn Tarrant (April 4, 1956 – August 5, 2019) was an American investor. He was the founder and chairman of MOV37 and Protégé Partners, firms specializing in identifying, seeding and early stage investing in investment funds. He was also a founding partner of film production company Candescent Films. He died from brain cancer in 2019.

== Education ==
Tarrant received a BA in economics from the University of California, Davis in 1978, and an MBA from Harvard Business School in 1985.

== Career ==
=== Early career ===
After graduating from Harvard Business School, Tarrant joined Berkeley Asset Management in Berkeley, California, as vice president, co-managing the Sequoia Fund, one of the first fund of hedge funds in the United States. He went on to manage assets for private family fortunes, including Sidney Kimmel (film producer and founder of the Jones Apparel Group). For the Thurn und Taxis family of Germany, he managed their marketable securities hedge fund portfolio and investments in the United States, United Kingdom and Europe.

In 1996, Tarrant founded Altvest, the first Web-based directory of hedge funds and managers. InvestorForce purchased it in 2000, and it was made a division of investment research firm Morningstar in 2006.

=== Protégé Partners ===
Tarrant served from 1998 to 2002 on the board of directors of The Investment Fund for Foundations (TIFF), an investment advisory firm for charitable foundations, and advised TIFF on building its first hedge fund of funds. In 2001, Tarrant was introduced to Ted Seides by TIFF founder David Salem, which led to the formation of Protégé Partners. Based in Manhattan, Protégé specializes in seeding and early stage investing in hedge funds. Tarrant initially served as chief investment officer (CIO) and chief executive officer, with Seides as president. Seides took over as co-CIO in 2011 until leaving the firm in 2015, at which point Tarrant resumed his role as sole CIO. The University of Texas and the New Jersey pension system were early investors with Protégé. As of 2016, Protégé manages $1.6 billion. In 2017, he moved into the role of chairman.

Tarrant is featured in Gregory Zuckerman's 2009 nonfiction book The Greatest Trade Ever, about John Paulson's use of credit default swaps to bet against the US subprime mortgage bubble. Tarrant and Paulson were discussing issues with the housing market as far back as 2004. Tarrant was the lead investor in Paulson's new fund, putting in $60 million on behalf of Protégé clients in 2006 (out of a total of $147 million Paulson would raise).

=== Buffett bet ===
In early 2008, Warren Buffett bet Protégé Partners that over a 10-year period, the S&P 500 Index would outperform a portfolio of hedge funds. For the bet, done through the Long Now Foundation, Protégé built an index of five funds of hedge funds, placing its bet on the average returns of those funds after all fees. Buffett bet on a low-cost S&P 500 index fund sold by Vanguard. Each side put up $320,000, with the money used to buy a US Treasury bond that would be worth $1 million at the conclusion of the bet, on December 31, 2017. The $1 million will be donated to the winner’s choice of charity. In 2012, after the bonds appreciated faster than expected and interest rates fell, the two sides agreed to buy 11,200 Berkshire Hathaway B shares, which at the end of 2017 were worth $2.22 million. Buffett won the bet, and that amount was donated to Girls Inc. of Omaha.

=== Digital currency ===
Tarrant was one of the backers of the MIT Media Lab's Bitcoin Developer Fund. It provides financial support for the three bitcoin developers working for the Media Lab's Digital Currency Initiative, which was launched in 2015 to explore issues involved in blockchain technology and cryptocurrency. In 2016, Tarrant invested in Polychain Capital, then the world's largest cryptocurrency hedge fund, cashing out at the end of 2017. He was an investor in early iterations of quantitative hedge fund investing, including Renaissance Technologies.

=== MOV37 ===
Around 2016, Tarrant began focusing on machine learning and data science, exploring hedge funds built on concepts of artificial intelligence, crowdsourcing, and digital currencies. In 2017, he began building a directory for this new wave of modern technology-driven funds, which he termed Autonomous Learning Investment Strategies (ALIS).

He founded MOV37 in 2017, an autonomous learning and data analysis firm which invests in emerging hedge funds. ALIS managers create a fully autonomous system that uses unstructured non-financial data, data science, record-low processing and storage costs, and machine learning that is constantly learning and improving based on incremental data.

=== Documentary films ===
Tarrant was a founding partner in the production company Candescent Films, which was started in 2010 to produce and finance documentary films exploring social issues. With Candescent, Tarrant was an executive producer on films including Sons of the Clouds, narrated by Javier Bardem, which premiered at the 2012 Berlin International Film Festival and won the 2013 Goya Award for Best Documentary Film; The Queen of Versailles, which won the 2012 Sundance Film Festival U.S. Directing Award for Documentary; Who Is Dayani Cristal? starring Gael García Bernal, which premiered at the 2013 Sundance Film Festival; and Trophy, which premiered at the 2017 Sundance Film Festival and was acquired by CNN Films and The Orchard.

Prior to his work with Candescent, Tarrant executive produced the 2007 documentary The Third Wave, based on a book written by Alison Thompson about her work aiding Sri Lankan survivors of the 2004 Asian tsunami. Tarrant and Bill Ackman executive produced the 2010 documentary Smash His Camera, about the life and career of paparazzi photographer Ron Galella. Directed by Leon Gast, it won the US Directing Award: Documentary at the 2010 Sundance Film Festival and was later picked up by Magnolia Pictures and HBO.

== Philanthropy ==
In 2002, Tarrant helped launch the London-based charity Absolute Return for Kids. He was the vice chairman of its United States affiliate, Friends of ARK.

In 2011, Tarrant joined the board of WITNESS, a nonprofit focused on human rights issues, founded in 1992 by musician Peter Gabriel and the Lawyers Committee for Human Rights. In the fall of 2016, Tarrant and Gabriel launched WITNESS Innovation Initiatives, whose goal is to collaborate with technology companies, schools, developers and activists to create human rights documenting skills. Tarrant was on the board of The Angiogenesis Foundation.

== Bibliography ==
- "Risikoreduzierung – Multi-Manager Portfolio – Nicht Traditioneller Investments" in Vermögensanlage mit ausgewogenem Risiko, Roger C. Gibson, editor, Germany: Verlag Moderne Industry, 1990.
- "Hedge Fund Investing: A Private Family Perspective" in Evaluating and Implementing Hedge Fund Strategies, Second Edition, Ronald A. Lake, editor, London: Euromoney Books, 1999.
- "The Life Cycle of Hedge Fund Managers" in Evaluating and Implementing Hedge Fund Strategies, Third Edition, Ronald A. Lake, editor, London: Euromoney Books, chapter 21, pp. 269–77, 2003.

== Filmography ==
Year	Title	Credited as	Notes
2006	God Grew Tired of Us	Executive producer	Won 2006 Sundance Film Festival Grand Jury Prize: Documentary, Audience Award: Documentary
2007	The Third Wave	Executive producer	
2010	Smash His Camera	Executive producer	Won 2010 Sundance Film Festival U.S. Directing Award: Documentary; nominated for 2011 News & Documentary Emmy Award for Outstanding Arts & Culture Programming; nominated for 2011 PGA Award for Documentary Producing
2012	The Queen of Versailles	Co-executive producer	Won 2012 Sundance Film Festival U.S. Directing Award: Documentary; nominated for DGA Award for Documentary Directing
2012	Sons of the Clouds	Executive producer	Won 2013 Goya Award for Best Documentary Film
2013	Who Is Dayani Cristal?	Executive producer	Won 2013 Sundance Film Festival Cinematography Award: World Cinema Documentary; Sundance Grand Jury Prize nominee
2013	Remote Area Medical	Executive producer	Won 2013 Traverse City Film Festival Founders Prize
2013	Likeness	Executive producer	Short film; nominated for 2014 Webby Award for Drama: Long Form or Series; nominated for Tribeca Film Festival Jury Award (Best Short Narrative)
2014	1971	Co-executive producer	Won 2015 International Documentary Association ABCNews VideoSource Award and 2015 Cinema Eye Honors Spotlight Award; named a 2016 Peabody Award finalist
2014	Private Violence	Executive producer	Won Candescent Award; nominated for Primetime Emmy Award for Outstanding Informational Programming – Long Form
2017	The Departure	Executive producer	Nominated for Independent Spirit Award: Best Documentary; nominated for Tribeca Film Festival: Best Documentary Feature
2017	Trophy	Executive producer	Nominated for 2017 Sundance Film Festival Grand Jury Prize: Documentary
2018	Generation Wealth	Executive producer	Nominated for 2018 Sarasota Film Festival Jury Prize; nominated for SXSW Film Festival Chicken & Egg Award
2018	Fantasy Island	Executive producer	
