= Candescent Films =

American film production company

- Type: Private
- Industry: Film
- Founded: 2010
- Founder: Lilly Hartley
- Headquarters: New York, NY
- Website: candescentfilms.com

Candescent Films is an American film production company that produces and finances documentary and narrative films that explore social issues.

== History ==
Candescent Films was founded in 2010 by producer and actress Lilly Hartley.

== Productions ==
The Queen of Versailles was Candescent's first supported film. Directed by Lauren Greenfield, it premiered opening day of the 2012 Sundance Film Festival.

Sons of the Clouds, a 2012 documentary exploring human rights issues in Western Sahara, was Candescent's second release. Starring Javier Bardem, the film was directed by Alvaro Longoria and produced by Longoria, Hartley and Bardem. It won the 2013 Goya Award for Best Documentary Film.

In 2013, Candescent produced Likeness, an eight-minute film about eating disorders and body image. It stars Elle Fanning and was directed by Academy Award-nominated cinematographer Rodrigo Prieto. After being approached by Candescent to write and direct a short film with a social message that was personal to him, Prieto chose the subject of body image, since his daughter had previously struggled with an eating disorder. After premiering at the 2013 Tribeca Film Festival, Likeness was released online via T: The New York Times Style Magazine. It was nominated for a 2014 Webby Award under the Drama: Long Form or Series category.

Other projects include Who is Dayani Cristal? (produced and narrated by Gael García Bernal), Fed Up (produced and narrated by Katie Couric), and 1971 and Art and Craft, which both premiered at the 2014 Tribeca Film Festival. 1971 won the ABCNews VideoSource Award at the 2015 International Documentary Association Awards, and the Spotlight Award at the 2015 Cinema Eye Honors. Art and Craft was shortlisted for the Academy Award for Best Documentary Feature. Cartel Land, 3½ Minutes, Ten Bullets and Racing Extinction all premiered at the 2015 Sundance Film Festival. Cartel Land won the Sundance Film Festival Directing Award: U.S. Documentary and U.S. Documentary Special Jury Award for Cinematography, and was nominated for the Academy Award for Best Documentary Feature. 3½ Minutes, Ten Bullets won the Sundance Film Festival U.S. Documentary Special Jury Award for Social Impact, and was shortlisted for the Academy Award for Best Documentary Feature.

Candescent's film Trophy, directed by Shaul Schwarz, which premiered at the 2017 Sundance Film Festival and was acquired by CNN Films and The Orchard. Candescent supported Step, which also premiered at Sundance 2017, where it won the U.S. Documentary Special Jury Award for Inspirational Filmmaking. Candescent helped finance the development and production of The Departure, directed by Lana Wilson. It premiered at the 2017 Tribeca Film Festival, and was nominated for the 2018 Independent Spirit Award for Best Documentary Feature. Wilson's first film, After Tiller, received a 2013 Candescent Award.

Candescent Received an "In Association With" credit for Generation Wealth, directed by Lauren Greenfield, which had its world premiere at the 2018 Sundance Film Festival, its European premiere at the Berlin International Film Festival, and was nominated for a 2018 Writers Guild of America Award for Best Documentary Screenplay. Candescent supported Charm City, which was shortlisted for the 2018 Academy Award for Best Documentary Feature. The film, directed by Marilyn Ness, premiered at the 2018 Tribeca Film Festival, and was distributed by PBS Distribution.

== Candescent Award ==
The "Candescent Award" is the name for two different awards, both issued by Candescent Films, one in cooperation with the Sundance Institute Documentary Film Program (DFP) and one in cooperation with the Tribeca Film Institute (TFI).

=== DFP Candescent Award ===
In 2012, Candescent Films created the Candescent Award in partnership with the Sundance Institute Documentary Film Program to support the creation and completion of socially conscious documentary films. It began as a two-year gift to the Sundance Institute Documentary Film Program, and has continued as an annual award given at the Sundance Film Festival in Park City, Utah.

The winner of the inaugural Candescent Award at the 2012 Sundance Film Festival was Escape Fire: The Fight to Rescue American Healthcare. The 2013 winners were Gideon's Army, about public defenders, and After Tiller, about the 2009 assassination of Dr. George Tiller. Both films were nominated for 2013 Spirit Awards. In January 2014, Candescent Films announced the three winners of its 2014 Candescent Award in partnership with the Sundance Institute: Marmato, about a Colombian mining town; Private Violence, about a domestic violence victim's fight to put her husband in prison; and E-Team, about a team of human rights investigators. The two winners of the 2015 Candescent Award were How to Change the World, which won the World Cinema Documentary Special Jury Award for Editing at the 2015 Sundance Film Festival, and (T)error, which won the U.S. Documentary Special Jury Award for Break Out First Feature at the 2015 Sundance Film Festival. The winner of the 2017 Candescent Award was City of Ghosts, directed by Matthew Heineman. Amazon bought the worldwide rights in January 2017.

=== TFI Candescent Award ===
In April 2014, in partnership with the Tribeca Film Institute, Candescent Films created a grant, also called the Candescent Award, given to films that have been supported by the Tribeca Film Institute. The winners of the inaugural Candescent Award through the Tribeca Film Festival were Nas: Time Is Illmatic, about the creation of rapper Nas' 1994 debut album Illmatic, and The Yes Men Are Revolting. The 2015 Candescent Award at the Tribeca Film Festival went to The Wolfpack, about six teenage brothers who have spent their lives locked in a Manhattan housing project.

=== SummerDocs Audience Award ===
Candescent sponsors the audience award at the Hamptons International Film Festival SummerDocs Series. The 2014 winner was Keep on Keepin' On, about the mentorship between jazz musician Clark Terry and blind piano prodigy Justin Kaulflin. The 2015 SummerDocs Audience Award winner was Best of Enemies, about the 1968 televised debates between Gore Vidal and William F. Buckley Jr. Betting on Zero was the winner of the 2016 SummerDocs Audience Award. Bathtubs Over Broadway, following comedy writer Steve Young on his quest to learn more about the world of industrial musicals, won the 2018 SummerDocs Audience Award.

== List of films ==
| Year | Title | Notes |
|---|---|---|
| 2012 | Escape Fire: The Fight to Rescue American Healthcare | Won Candescent Award |
| 2012 | Sons of the Clouds | Won 2013 Goya Award for Best Documentary Film |
| 2012 | The Queen of Versailles | Nominated for DGA Award, IDA Award and Critics' Choice Award, Southeastern Film Critics Association Award for Best Documentary, 2012 Sundance Film Festival Directing Award (Lauren Greenfield) and Nominated: Grand Jury Prize |
| 2013 | After Tiller | Won Candescent Award; won a 2015 News & Documentary Emmy Award for Best Documentary; nominated for Sundance Film Festival U.S. Grand Jury Prize: Documentary; nominated for Independent Spirit Award for Best Documentary Feature; nominated for four Cinema Eye Honors awards; named a 2013 top five documentary by the National Board of Review |
| 2013 | Gideon's Army | Won Candescent Award; nominated for Independent Spirit Award for Best Documentary Feature |
| 2013 | Likeness | Short film; nominated for Webby Award; nominated for Tribeca Film Festival Jury Award (Best Short Narrative) |
| 2013 | Remote Area Medical | Traverse City Film Festival Winner: Founders Prize for Best Documentary |
| 2013 | Who Is Dayani Cristal? | 2013 Sundance Film Festival - Winner: Cinematography Award, Nominee: Grand Jury Prize |
| 2014 | 1971 | Won 2015 International Documentary Association ABCNews VideoSource Award and 2015 Cinema Eye Honors Spotlight Award. Named a 2016 Peabody Award finalist. |
| 2014 | Art and Craft | Shortlisted for Academy Award for Best Documentary Feature |
| 2014 | E-Team | Won Candescent Award |
| 2014 | Fed Up | Nominated for Sundance Film Festival Grand Jury Prize: Documentary; nominated for News & Documentary Emmy Award for Outstanding Graphic Design and Art Direction |
| 2014 | Marmato | Won Candescent Award |
| 2014 | Private Violence | Won Candescent Award; nominated for Primetime Emmy Award for Outstanding Informational Programming – Long Form |
| 2014 | Nas: Time Is Illmatic | Won Candescent Award |
| 2014 | The Yes Men Are Revolting | Won Candescent Award |
| 2015 | Cartel Land | Won Sundance Film Festival Directing Award: U.S. Documentary and U.S. Documentary Special Jury Award for Cinematography; nominated for Academy Award for Best Documentary Feature |
| 2015 | How to Change the World | Won Candescent Award; won Sundance Film Festival World Cinema Documentary Special Jury Award for Editing |
| 2015 | Racing Extinction | Nominated for Sundance Film Festival U.S. Grand Jury Prize: Documentary |
| 2015 | (T)error | Won Candescent Award; won Sundance Film Festival U.S. Documentary Special Jury Award for Break Out First Feature |
| 2015 | 3½ Minutes, Ten Bullets | Won Sundance Film Festival U.S. Documentary Special Jury Award for Social Impact; shortlisted for Academy Award for Best Documentary Feature |
| 2015 | The Wolfpack | Won Candescent Award; won Sundance Film Festival U.S. Grand Jury Prize: Documentary |
| 2016 | Solitary | |
| 2016 | Vegas Baby | |
| 2017 | City of Ghosts | Won Candescent Award |
| 2017 | The Departure | Nominated for Independent Spirit Award for Best Documentary Feature; nominated for Tribeca Film Festival Award for Best Documentary Feature |
| 2017 | Step | Won Sundance Film Festival U.S. Documentary Special Jury Award for Inspirational Filmmaking |
| 2017 | Trophy | 2017 Sundance Film Festival Nominee: Grand Jury Prize; Critics Choice Documentary Award nominee for Best Sports Documentary |
| 2018 | Charm City | Shortlisted for 2018 Academy Award for Best Documentary Feature |
| 2018 | Generation Wealth | Nominated for 2018 WGA Award for Best Documentary Screenplay |
| 2019 | Fantasy Island | |
