= John C. Raines =

American activist

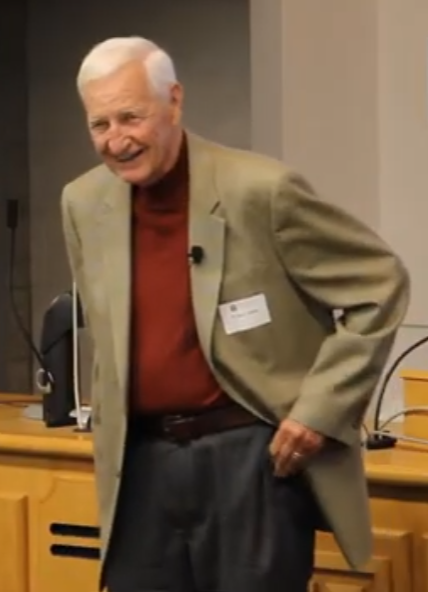
- Speaking at Temple University in 2014
- Born: October 27, 1933; Minneapolis, Minnesota, US
- Died: November 12, 2017 (aged 84); Philadelphia, Pennsylvania, US
- Education: B.A. in English (1955); Doctorate in Christian Social Ethics
- Alma mater: Carleton College; Union Theological Seminary
- Title: Reverend Doctor
- Movement: Citizens' Commission to Investigate the FBI
- Spouse: Bonnie Muir Raines
- Children: 4

John Curtis Raines (October 27, 1933 – November 12, 2017) was an American Methodist minister, religion professor, anti-war activist, and whistleblower. He was a member of the Citizens' Commission to Investigate the FBI, which conspired to steal documents from an FBI office in 1971 and exposed illegal activity and abuses of power, including COINTELPRO.

== Early life ==
Raines was born in Minneapolis, the son of an affluent Methodist minister, and was raised by a governess in a house with five fireplaces and seven bathrooms. He had one brother. He graduated from Carleton College in 1955 with a major in English, and went on to study Christian social ethics at Union Theological Seminary.

== Career ==
His first job after graduating was as a Methodist minister in Setauket, Long Island. He became a professor of religion at Temple University, where he taught for over 40 years.

== Political activism ==
In 1961 he became involved in the civil rights movement after he was invited by the Congress of Racial Equality to travel as part of the Freedom Riders on an integrated bus from St. Louis to Little Rock. It was on this trip, where white mobs met the riders and he was briefly sent to jail, his eyes were opened to injustice and its intersection with his own Christian faith. Raines and his wife, Bonnie, continued to be involved in political causes and protests in the coming years, even breaking into draft board offices to disrupt records related to the draft for the Vietnam War.

While a professor at Temple, Raines was approached by William C. Davidon, a Haverford College physics professor, who suggested breaking into the FBI office to find proof of illegal practices. While initially skeptical, John and Bonnie eventually became convinced and began planning the break in with a group of eight co-conspirators in the attic of their home. They targeted a small FBI office outside of city limits in Media, Pennsylvania which had far less security than the more prominent Philadelphia building. The group carefully researched and made extensive preparations--Bonnie went undercover as a Swarthmore student studying FBI hiring practices of women, and was allowed access to the interior of the building, where she took note of security systems and layout. They decided to break in on March 8, 1971, the night of the historic boxing match between Joe Frazier and Muhammad Ali, knowing that security personnel would be distracted by the fight. That evening, Raines was stationed in a getaway car parked near Swarthmore College while the others went into the office. The plan went almost without a hitch and was completed in less than an hour. In total, the group shoved more than 1,000 documents into suitcases, which they inspected in a nearby farmhouse that night, discovering that their suspicions about the FBI's activity were correct. They made copies of the documents and mailed them to three major news outlets, as well as two Democratic government officials. To preserve their safety, the group agreed never to meet again and went their separate ways.

Several months later, FBI agents visited the Raineses at their house to ask if they had any information that could help them find the culprits behind the theft. Raines cited his indignation at the information from the documents published in the Washington Post and refused to offer his help. The case remained unsolved for decades until Raines revealed his involvement to investigative reporter Betty Medsger (who had initially broken the original story), long after the statute of limitations had passed.

== Personal life ==
During a summer break, he met and married Bonnie Raines (née Muir), a waitress from Michigan State University who had also joined a political group dedicating to improving racial relations. They had four children and seven grandchildren.

Raines died at his home in Philadelphia on November 12, 2017.
