= Westfalenstadion =

Football stadium in Dortmund, Germany

Coordinates: 51°29′33″N 7°27′6″E

Signal Iduna Park
- Westfalenstadion; BVB Stadion Dortmund (UEFA competitions)

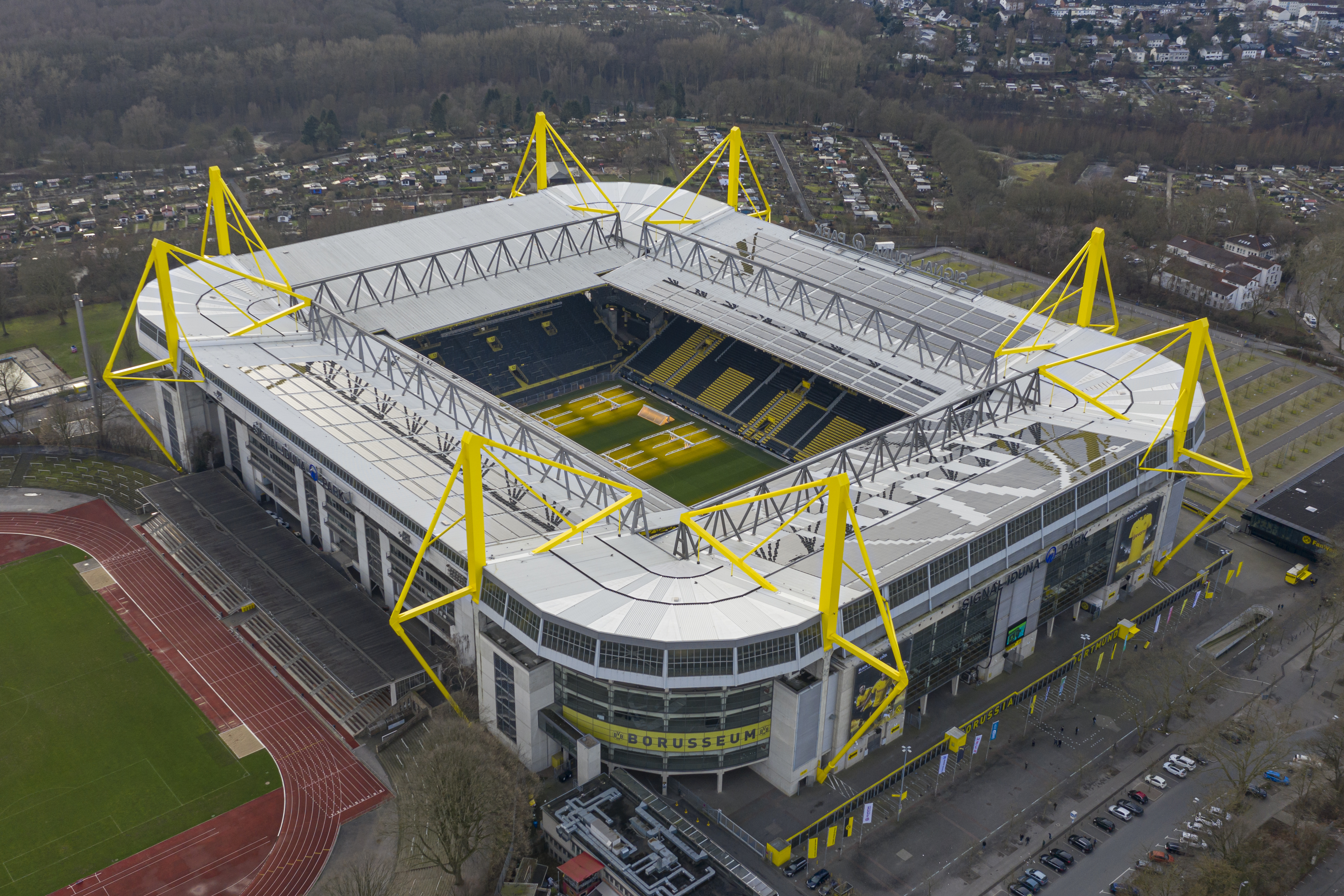
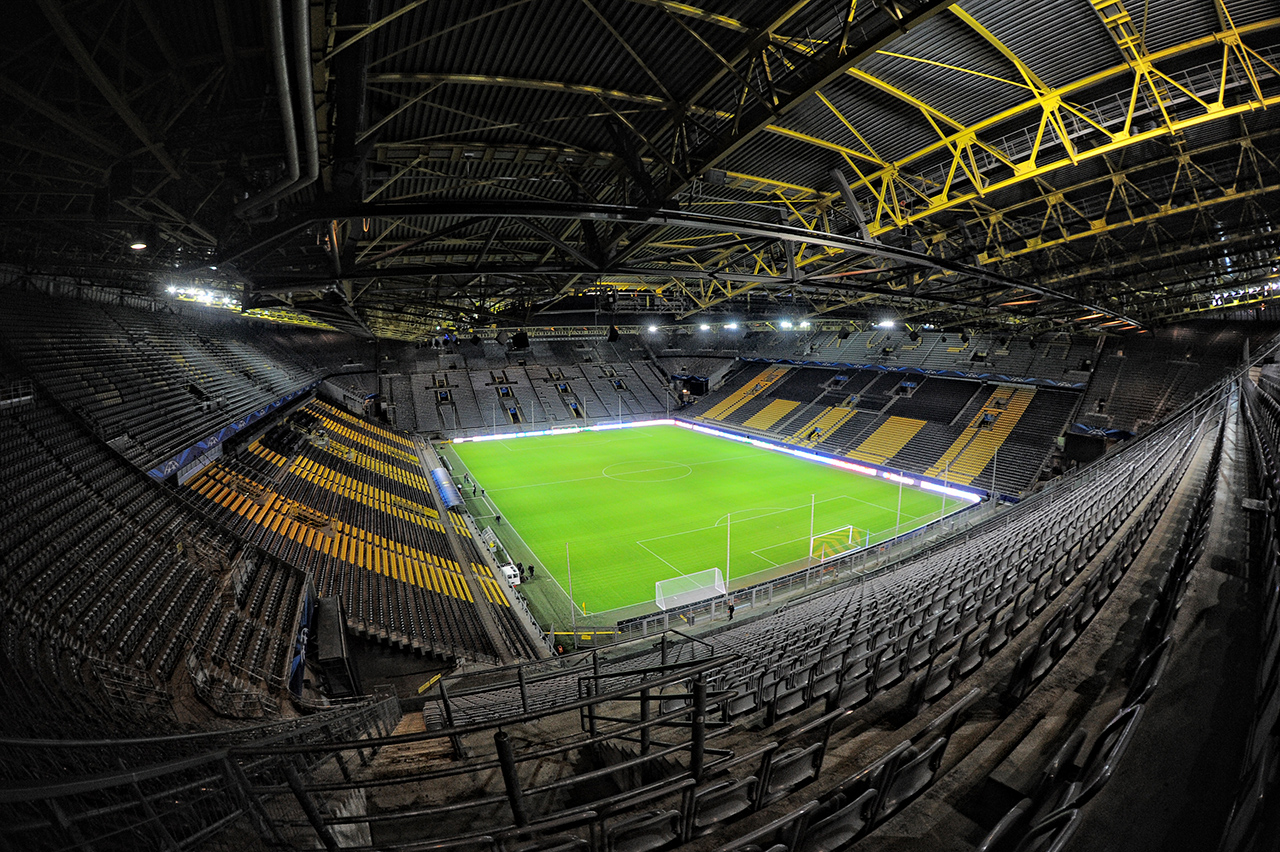
- UEFA
- Interactive map of Signal Iduna Park
- Full name: Signal Iduna Park
- Former names: Westfalenstadion; FIFA World Cup Stadium Dortmund (2006 FIFA World Cup)
- Address: Strobelallee 50
- Location: Dortmund, North Rhine-Westphalia, Germany
- Owner: Borussia Dortmund GmbH & Co. KGa
- Operator: Borussia Dortmund GmbH & Co. KGa
- Capacity: 81,365 (domestic matches), 66,099 (international matches) Capacity history: 53,872 (1974–1992) 42,800 (1992–1996) 54,000 (1996–1999) 68,600 (1999–2003) 83,000 (2003–2005) 81,264 (2005–2006) 80,708 (2006–2008) 80,552 (2008–2010) 80,720 (2010–2011) 80,645 (2012–2013) 80,667 (2014)
- Executive suites: 11
- Surface: Hybrid grass
- Record attendance: 83,000 6 matches: Dortmund-Schalke, 30 January 2004 Dortmund-Stuttgart, 6 March 2004 Dortmund-Bayern, 17 April 2004 Dortmund-Rostock, 1 May 2004 Dortmund-Bayern, 18 September 2004 Dortmund-Schalke, 5 December 2004
- Field size: 105 by 68 m (344 by 223 ft)

Construction
- Built: 1971–1974
- Opened: 2 April 1974; 52 years ago
- Renovated: 1992, 1995–99, 2002–03, 2006
- Cost: DM32.7 million (1974) estimated €200 million (2006)
- Architect: Planungsgruppe Drahtler

Tenants
- Borussia Dortmund (1974–present); Germany national football team (selected matches); Borussia Dortmund II (selected matches)

Website
- signal-iduna-park.de

Westfalenstadion (German pronunciation: [vɛstˈfaːlənˌʃtaːdi̯ɔn], lit. 'Westphalia stadium') is a football stadium in Dortmund, North Rhine-Westphalia, Germany, which is the home stadium of Borussia Dortmund. Officially called Signal Iduna Park [zɪɡˌnaːl ʔiˈduːna ˌpaʁk] for sponsorship reasons and BVB Stadion Dortmund in UEFA competitions, the name derives from the former Prussian province of Westphalia.

It has a league capacity of 81,365 (standing and seated) and an international capacity of 65,829 (seated only). It is Germany's largest stadium, the sixth-largest in Europe, and the third-largest home to a top-flight European club after Camp Nou and Santiago Bernabéu Stadium. It holds the European record for average fan attendance, set in the 2011–12 season with almost 1.37 million spectators over 17 games at an average of 80,588 per game. Sales of annual season tickets amounted to 55,000 in 2015.

The 24,454 capacity Südtribüne (South Bank) is the largest terrace for standing spectators in European football, after the terraces-ban within FIFA, FA and UEFA affiliated football. Famous for the intense atmosphere it breeds, the south terrace has been nicknamed Die Gelbe Wand, meaning "The Yellow Wall". The Borusseum, the museum of Borussia Dortmund, is located in the north-east part of the stadium.

The stadium hosted matches in the 1974 and 2006 FIFA World Cups. It also hosted the 2001 UEFA Cup final. Various national friendlies and qualification matches for World and European tournaments have been played there, as well as matches in European club competitions.

== History ==
Plans to construct a new stadium were drawn up in the 1960s, as the need arose to expand and refurbish the traditional ground of Borussia Dortmund, the Stadion Rote Erde ("Red Soil Stadium"). In 1966, the team won the 1966 Cup Winners' Cup (Dortmund was the first German team to win a European club title) and it became clear that the Stadion Rote Erde was too small for the increasing number of Borussia Dortmund supporters. The city of Dortmund, however, was not able to finance a new stadium and federal institutions were unwilling to help.

In 1971, Dortmund was selected to replace the city of Cologne, which was forced to withdraw its plans to host games in the 1974 FIFA World Cup. The funds originally set aside for the projected stadium in Cologne were thus re-allocated to Dortmund. However, architects and planners had to manage costs due to a tight budget. This meant that plans for a 60 million DM oval stadium featuring the traditional athletic facilities and holding 60,000 spectators had to be discarded. Instead, plans for a much cheaper 54,000 spectator football arena, built of pre-fabricated concrete sections, became a reality. Ultimately, the costs amounted to 32.7 million DM, of which 1.6 million DM were invested in the refurbishment of the Stadion Rote Erde. The city of Dortmund, initially burdened with 6 million DM, only had to pay 800,000 DM, and quickly profited from the stadium's high revenues.

On 2 April 1974, Borussia Dortmund officially moved into their new home and has played in the Westfalenstadion ever since. Having been relegated in 1972, Borussia Dortmund was the only member of the 2. Bundesliga (second Division) to host the 1974 World Cup games in a completely new stadium. In 1976, after promotion to the Bundesliga, Borussia Dortmund played its first game in Germany's highest division in their new home stadium.

On 16 May 2001, the Westfalenstadion hosted the 2001 UEFA Cup final between Liverpool and Alavés.

== 1974 FIFA World Cup ==
In the 1974 FIFA World Cup, the Westfalenstadion hosted three group stage games and one final group game. The maximum capacity of the stadium was 54,000.

The Group 2 match between Scotland and Zaire (2-0) on 14 June was the first time a Sub-Saharan African country played a FIFA World Cup game.

Date	Team #1	Res.	Team #2	Round	Spectators	Ref.
14 June 1974	Scotland	2–0	Zaire	Group 2	25,000	
19 June 1974	Netherlands	0–0	Sweden	Group 3	53,700	
23 June 1974	Netherlands	4–1	Bulgaria	Group 3	52,100	
3 July 1974	Netherlands	2–0	Brazil	Group A	52,500	

== 2006 FIFA World Cup ==
The stadium was one of the venues for the 2006 FIFA World Cup. Due to sponsorship contracts, however, the arena was called FIFA World Cup Stadium Dortmund during the World Cup.

Six games were played there during the tournament, including Germany's first loss ever at the stadium, a 2–0 defeat to Italy. Also, Trinidad and Tobago played their first ever World Cup match at the stadium, against Sweden.

Date	Time (CET)	Team #1	Result	Team #2	Round	Spectators	Ref.
10 June 2006	18:00	Trinidad and Tobago	0–0	Sweden	Group B	62,959	
14 June 2006	21:00	Germany	1–0	Poland	Group A	65,000	
19 June 2006	15:00	Togo	0–2	Switzerland	Group G	65,000	
22 June 2006	21:00	Japan	1–4	Brazil	Group F	65,000	
27 June 2006	17:00	Brazil	3–0	Ghana	Round of 16	65,000	
4 July 2006	21:00	Germany	0–2	Italy	Semi-finals	65,000	

== UEFA Euro 2024 ==
The stadium hosted six matches for the UEFA Euro 2024, which included a round of 16 and a semifinals match. During the tournament, severe thunderstorms and heavy rainfall caused water to cascade through sections of the stadium roof, soaking spectators ahead of the group-stage match between Turkey and Georgia. Similar weather conditions during the round-of-16 match between Germany and Denmark led to a temporary suspension of play because of lightning and torrential rain, while spectators were again affected by leaks from the stadium roof.

Date	Time (CET)	Team #1	Result	Team #2	Round	Spectators	Ref.
15 June 2024	21:00	Italy	2–1	Albania	Group B	60,512	
18 June 2024	18:00	Turkey	3–1	Georgia	Group F	59,127	
22 June 2024	18:00	Turkey	0–3	Portugal	Group F	61,047	
25 June 2024	18:00	France	1–1	Poland	Group D	59,728	
29 June 2024	21:00	Germany	2–0	Denmark	Round of 16	61,612	
10 July 2024	21:00	Netherlands	1–2	England	Semi-finals	60,926	

== Layout ==
Situated directly next to Stadion Rote Erde, the Westfalenstadion is composed of four roofed grandstands, each facing the playing field on the east, south, west and north sides. The eastern and western stands (Ost- und Westtribüne) run the entire length of the field, while the breadth is covered by the north and south stands (Nord- und Südtribüne).

Originally, the corners between the four grandstands remained empty and the spectators appreciated the extensive roof, which covered over 80% of the stands. The eastern and western stands housed the stadium's 17,000 seats, while the 37,000 standing places were housed in the northern and southern stands.

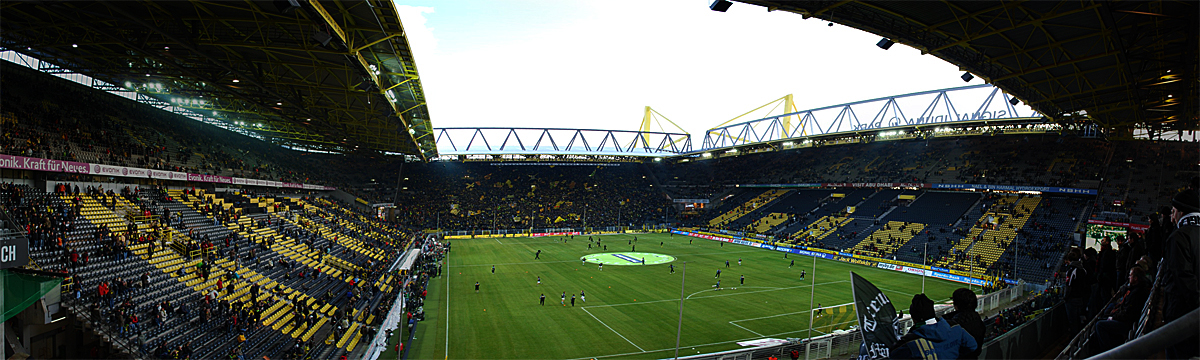
A panoramic view of Westfalenstadion

Located on the southern terrace of the stadium is Dortmund's "Yellow Wall", which is the largest free-standing grandstand in Europe, with a capacity of 25,000. The "Yellow Wall" gives Westfalenstadion one of the most intimidating home atmospheres in all of Europe, aiding Borussia Dortmund to an unbeaten home campaign in the 2012–13 UEFA Champions League. Then-Bayern Munich midfielder Bastian Schweinsteiger, when asked whether he feared Dortmund's players or their manager more, responded by saying "It is the Yellow Wall that scares me the most".

== Expansions ==
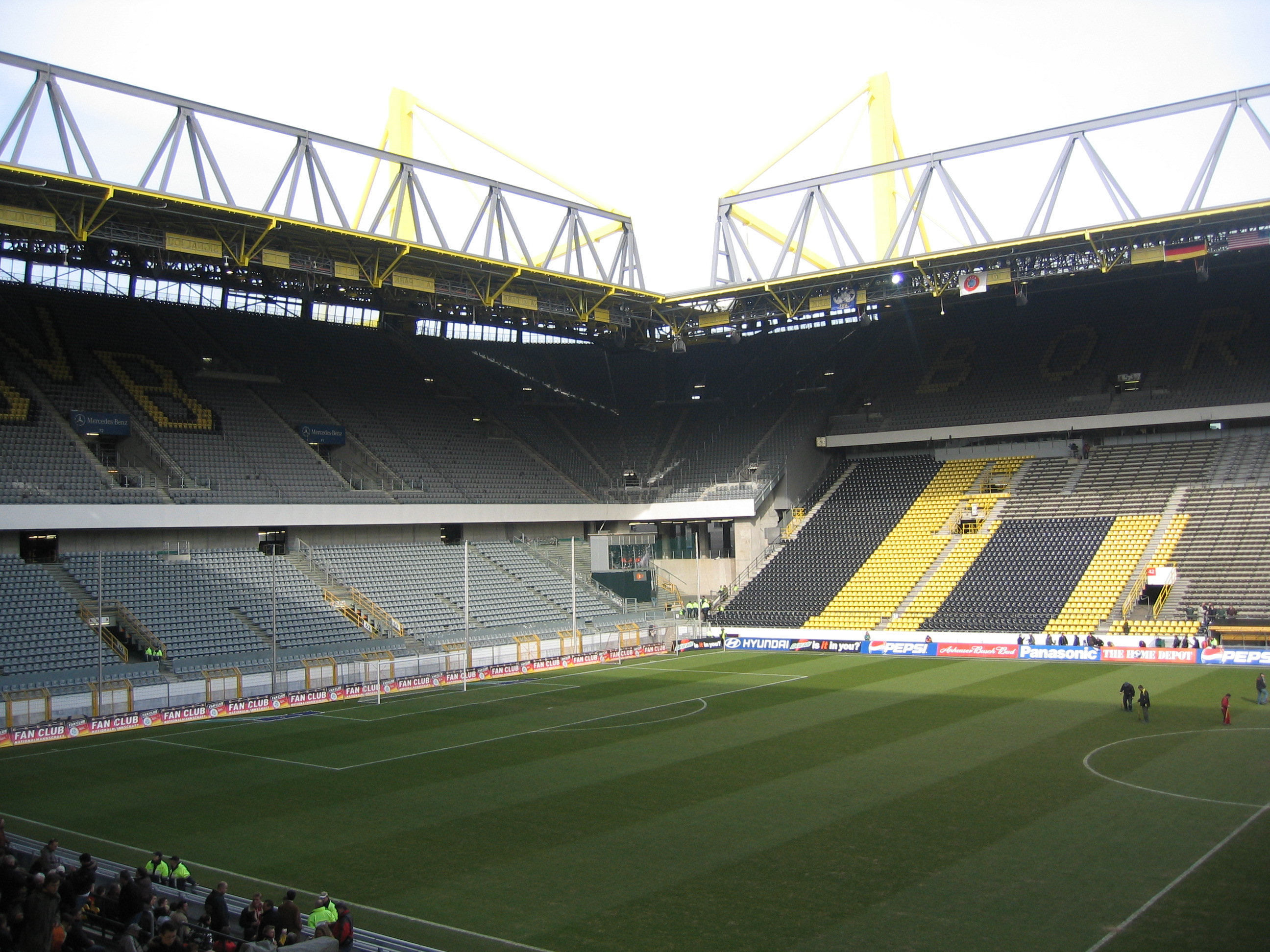
Westfalenstadion seen from inside

The first expansion plans are dated back to 1961, although the required funding was not available until 4 October 1971 when the city council decided to rebuild the stadium between 1971 and 1974 for the FIFA World Cup. As part of the extensions an additional roof was added around the stadium that weighed 3000 tons.

The original capacity of 54,000 was reduced in 1992 due to UEFA regulations. As the standing rows on the entire northern, the lower eastern and the lower western grandstands were converted into seats, the capacity shrank to 42,800. With 26,000 seats (23,000 covered), the seating in the Westfalenstadion outnumbered the standing rows.

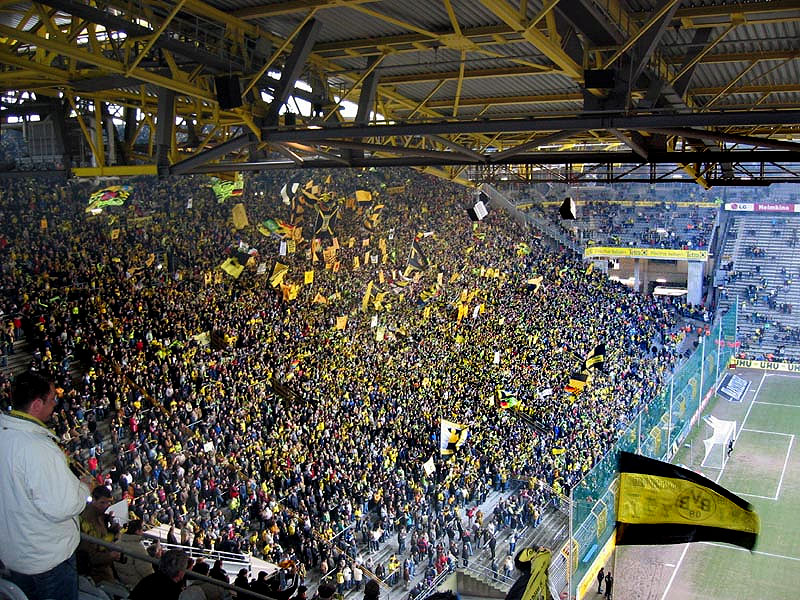
The south stand, Die Südtribüne, is the largest free-standing grandstand in Europe. Fans call it "Die gelbe Wand", which means "The Yellow Wall".

After Borussia Dortmund won the Bundesliga in 1995, the Westfalenstadion was expanded yet again. In the first private venture stadium expansion in German history, the two main grandstands, the eastern and the western blocks, received a second tier. Covered by a new roof-construction, each section housed an additional 6,000 seats. Thus, the stadium's capacity was restored to the original 54,000, of which the majority (38,500) were now covered seats. Following Dortmund's 1997 UEFA Champions League victory, success and an ever-growing number of enthusiastic fans made it necessary to enlarge the Westfalenstadion yet again. The southern and northern grandstands were enlarged this time, boosting the total capacity to 68,800 spectators. The southern standing ranks ("Die Südtribüne", where the home team's supporters gather) became the largest free-standing grandstand of its kind in the whole of Europe, with a capacity of 25,000.

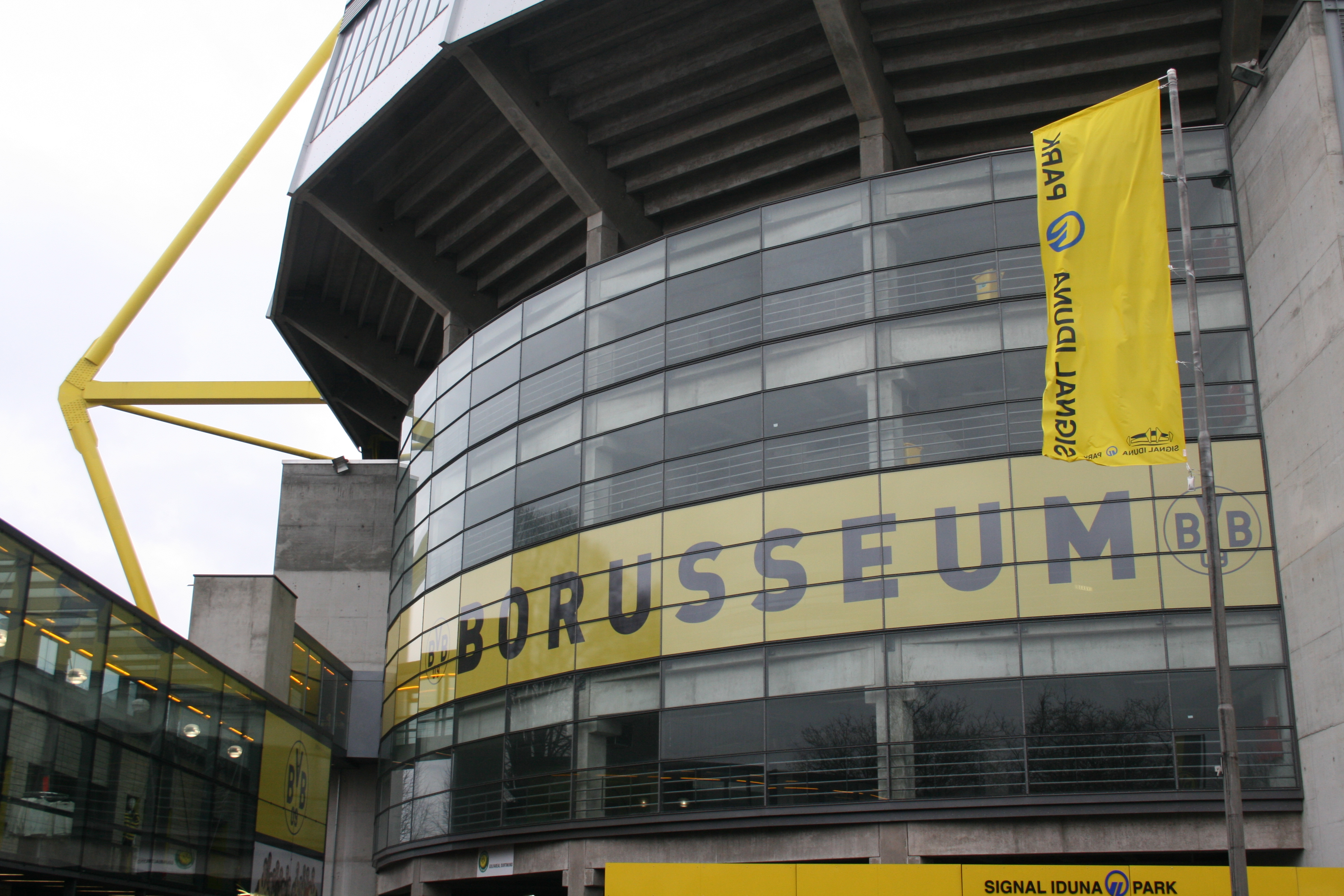
The Borusseum, a museum about Borussia Dortmund, opened in 2008.

When Germany won the World Cup bid in 2000, it became clear that Westfalenstadion would play a leading role in hosting the tournament. However, as the Westfalenstadion failed to fulfill FIFA requirements for hosting semi-finals, it had to be enlarged a third time. Four new stands were built to fill the corners between the existing grandstands, raising the seating capacity for international games from 52,000 to 67,000. Additionally, the new corner elements provided seating and catering to VIP guests, increasing the total number of VIP seats to 5,000. In order to provide the new sections with an unblocked view of the field, the existing interior roof supports were removed and replaced by exterior pylons, which were painted yellow to suit the Borussia Dortmund colours. During the course of those renovations, construction workers found an undetonated 1,000–pound (450 kg) bomb dropped by an Allied bomber in the Second World War that was only about one metre below the halfway line on the pitch. Bomb disposal experts had to evacuate the stadium and surrounding neighbourhood in Dortmund, which as part of Germany's industrial centre was bombed heavily, before taking an hour to defuse the device.

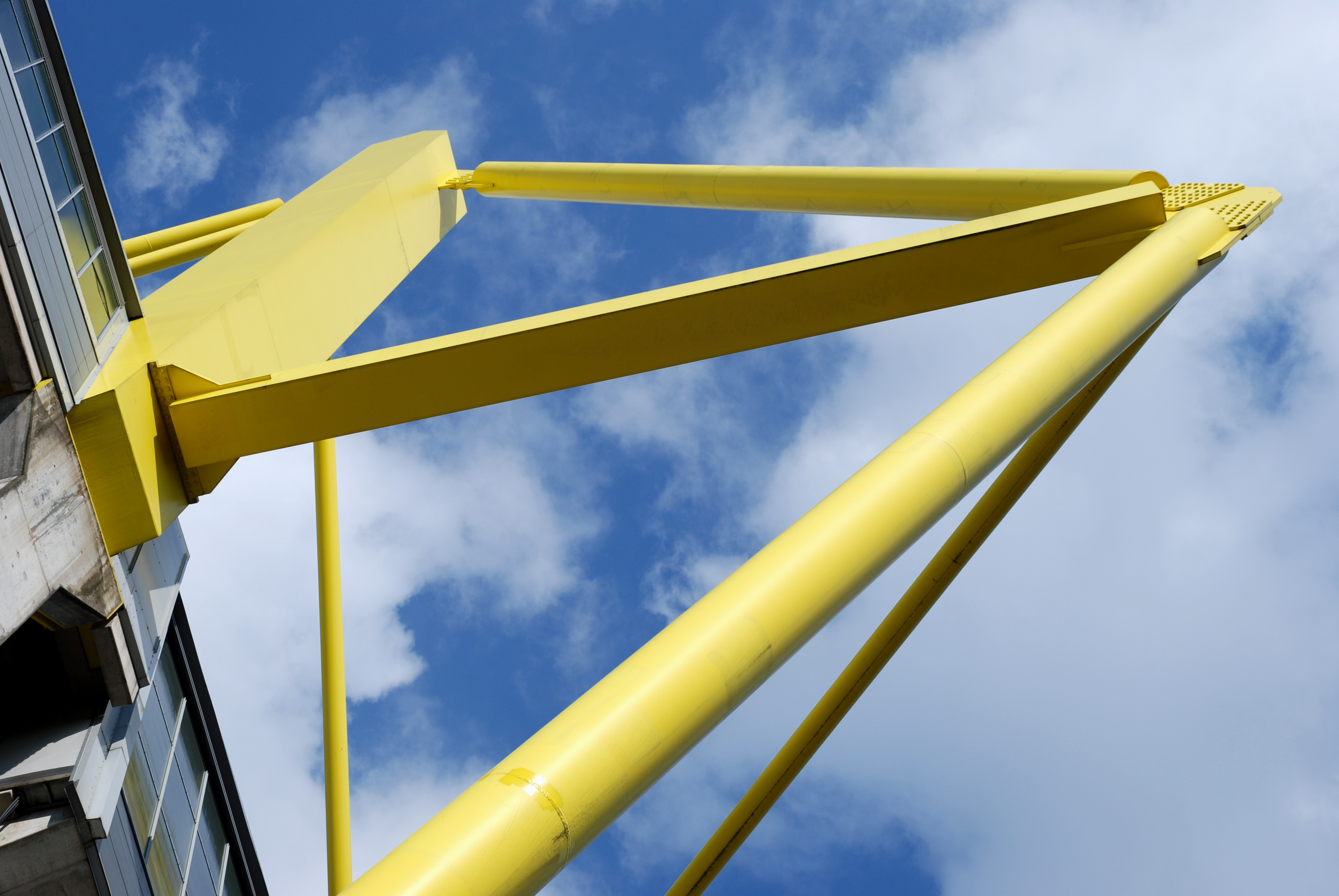
The yellow pylons that give the stadium its characteristic exterior

Considered as one of the biggest and most comfortable stadiums in Europe. The last renovation was made for the 2006 FIFA World Cup. The stadium has a glass front, under-soil heating (allowing matches in winter) and the biggest terraced stand. It is Germany's largest stadium capacity of 81,360. The expansion was realised by the German architectural firm of Architekten Schröder Schulte-Ladbeck. There are four video screens inside the stadium. The fifth screen on the outside of the north stands is smaller, measuring 28 square meters.

Since 1 December 2005, Westfalenstadion carries the name of Signal Iduna Park. This agreement was extended in February 2022 until 2031.

The stadium now hosts up to 81,365 fans (standing and seated) for league matches. As match ticket prices are among the lowest among Europe's Big Five football leagues (England, Germany, Spain, France and Italy), the stadium attracts many English fans to its games and has started conducting stadium tours in English.

The stadium is set to undergo some renovation works in 2018 with the stadium's capacity to rise to 81,365 for Bundesliga Matches and 66,099 for international matches. Free wifi is due to be introduced but the club plans to shut off the signal while play is going on so fans will put their smartphones away and pay attention to supporting the team.

Starting in the 2022–23 season, fans were allowed to stand during Champions League games, raising the capacity to 81,365 (same as league matches).

== Owners ==
The property of the Westfalenstadion, originally belonging to the city of Dortmund and later sold to the club Borussia Dortmund, was sold to a real estate trust in 2002 when the club was facing serious financial problems. Following that, Westfalenstadion was in the possession of Florian Homm for about two years, it was sold back to a real estate trust with Borussia Dortmund intending to repurchase the stadium gradually up to 2017. However, the club was not able to pay the regular rates in spring 2005 and the holders of the trust agreed in cutting back the asset's interest rates and allowed the club to pay the rates after financial reorganisation. Because of these measures, bankruptcy of the club was avoided and the future of the facility was secured. In 2006, Borussia Dortmund became the new owner by buying the stadium back with the help of a loan from Morgan Stanley. Borussia Dortmund paid off the loan from Morgan Stanley in 2008.

In order to reduce debt, the naming rights to the stadium was sold to an insurance company, Signal Iduna.. Since 2005, the stadium has been known as the "Signal Iduna Park". During the 2006 FIFA World Cup, the stadium was called "FIFA World Cup Stadium, Dortmund" since Signal Iduna was not FIFA's sponsor. In 2022, the deal was extended until 2031.

== Transport ==
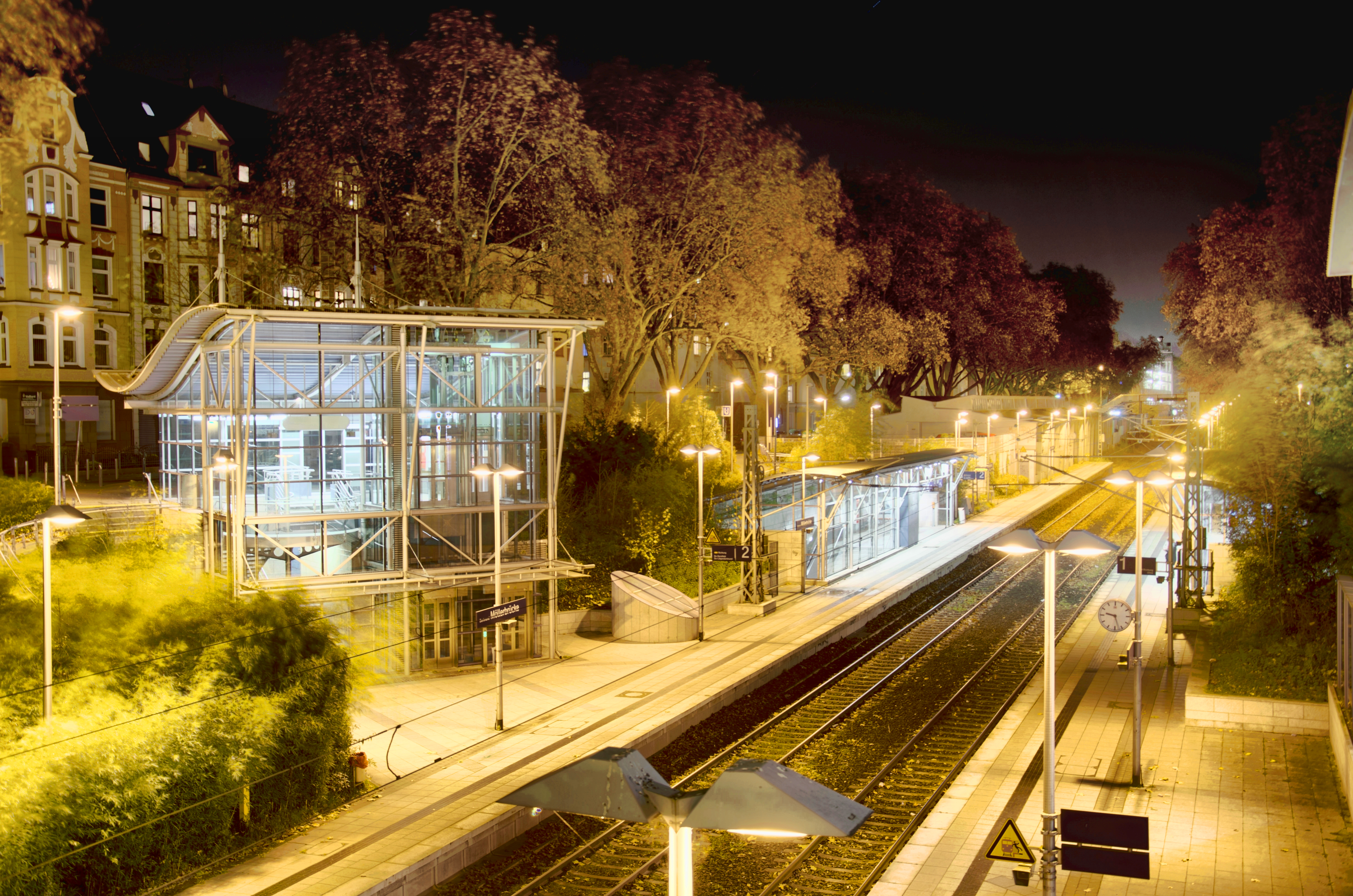
Subway Station Möllerbrücke

Signal Iduna Park can be reached with the Dortmund Stadtbahn (light rail) lines U42 (Theodor-Fliedner-Heim Station), U45 (Stadion Station), U46 (Westfalenhallen Station and also Stadion). The U45 and U46 are unique in that they serve the special station, Stadion, that is open on game days only. Additionally Deutsche Bahn serves the Dortmund Signal-Iduna-Park station with both regularly scheduled and special game-day trains. This station can be reached using regional RB trains from Dortmund Central Station, as well as from other cities in the metropolitan area, such as Hagen, Iserlohn, and Lüdenscheid. However, some supporters usually alight the U42 and S4 at the Möllerbrücke station and walk to Signal Iduna Park through the Kreuzviertel via Lindemannstraße or Arneckestraße.

The stadium can be reached from Dortmund Airport by taking the shuttle bus to the Holzwickede/Dortmund Airport train station, taking train RB59 towards Dortmund Central Station and getting out at Signal Iduna Park.

By car the stadium can be reached via the B 1 Ruhrschnellweg and B 54. Parking is also available at the Technical University of Dortmund, where shuttle busses take fans to the stadium.

=== Surroundings ===
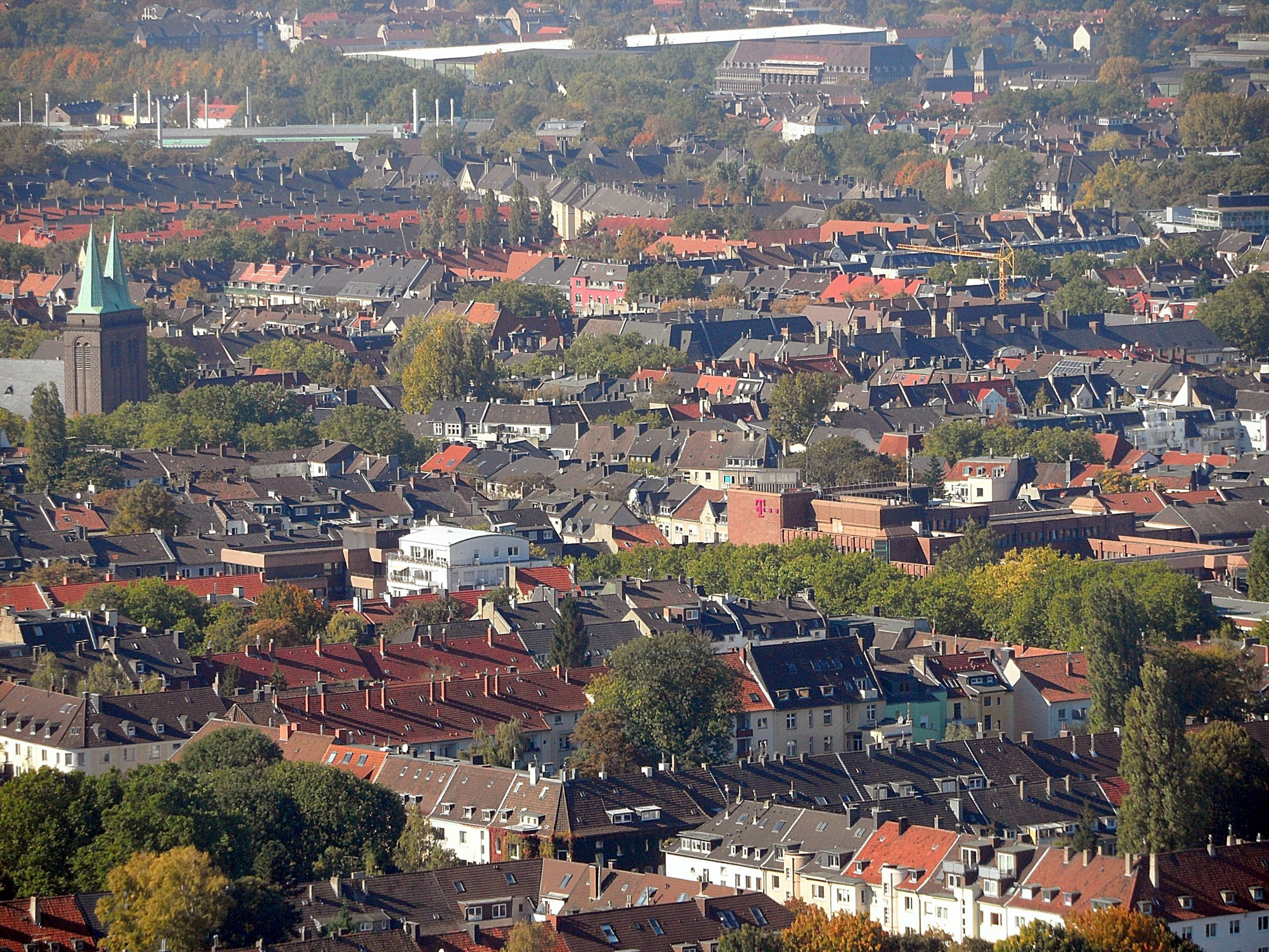
Surrounding Area – Kreuzviertel

From the subway station Möllerbrücke visitors approach the stadium through the Kreuzviertel. It is well known for its many bars, clubs, pubs, and cafes, all concentrated in the vicinity of Kreuzstraße and Vinkeplatz. On match days, many traders sell beer, sausages (Bratwurst) and jerseys on the street. The north side of the stadium is also the site of many exhibition hotels, apartments, and the "Mit Schmackes" - a football-themed restaurant and fan clubhouse conceived by former Borussia Dortmund player Kevin Grosskreutz.

On the other side of the Autobahn, the trade fair with its Westfalenhallen and TV Tower called Florianturm affords an unobstructed view of the stadium.

== See also ==
- Lists of stadiums
