= 1971 (disambiguation) =

1971 was the 71st year of the 20th century.

1971 may refer to the following films:

- 1971 (2007 film), a 2007 Indian film directed by Amrit Sagar
- 1971 (2014 film), a 2014 American film about the break-in of an FBI office in Media, Pennsylvania in 1971
- 1971: Beyond Borders, 2017 Indian film
- '71 (film), a 2014 British film
