= Look into My Eyes (film) =

2024 film by Lana Wilson

- Film poster
- Directed by: Lana Wilson
- Produced by: Kyle Martin; Lana Wilson
- Cinematography: Stephen Maing
- Edited by: Hannah Buck
- Production companies: Artemis Rising Foundation; Chicken & Egg Pictures; Secret Sauce Media; Drifting Cloud Productions
- Distributed by: A24
- Release dates: January 22, 2024 (Sundance); September 6, 2024 (United States)
- Running time: 108 minutes
- Country: United States
- Language: English

Look into My Eyes is a 2024 American documentary film, directed and produced by Lana Wilson. It follows a group of psychics in New York City, conducting intimate readings for their clients.

It had its world premiere at the Sundance Film Festival on January 22, 2024. It was released on September 6, 2024, by A24, and received positive reviews from critics. It was named one of the top 5 documentary films of 2024 by the National Board of Review.

== Premise ==
A group of seven psychics in the New York City area conduct intimate readings for their clients. The documentary is shot mostly with one or two people in natural light without captions identifying anyone onscreen, music to cue the viewers or any narration to distract, editorialize, or interrupt the emotional intimacy.

While the movie questions some of the psychics if they have any doubts about what they do, it neglects to look at the ethics and potential harms of the readings and none of the psychics had their abilities or claims tested. Interviews with the clients done after the readings were recorded but were not included in the movie.

== Production ==
In March 2022, it was announced Lana Wilson would direct and produce a documentary film revolving around psychics in New York City. Catapult Film Fund and Artemis Rising provided financing for the film, with A24 producing and distributing.

== Release ==
It had its world premiere at the 2024 Sundance Film Festival on January 22. It later screened at True/False Film Festival on March 1, 2024. It was released by A24 on September 6, 2024.

== Reception ==
On the review aggregator website Rotten Tomatoes, 91% of 53 critics' reviews are positive, with an average rating of 7.2/10. The website's consensus reads: "More interested in the psychology of psychics than the veracity of their craft, Look Into My Eyes is an entertaining documentary that finds humanity in the supernatural." Metacritic, which uses a weighted average, assigned the film a score of 79 out of 100, based on 18 critics, indicating "generally favorable" reviews.

Matt Zoller Seitz of RogerEbert.com gave the film four out of four stars and wrote, "It may seem fragmented, elusive, or 'arty' to modern audiences who aren't into older movies and have no reference point for what they're watching. Hopefully not, though, because it's an often profound and touching documentary that engages your attention differently than movies usually do."
