= Bedby8 =

Bedby8 is a production company co-founded by Ali Wentworth and George Stephanopolous.

== History ==
In December 2022, Wentworth and Stephanopolous announced the company's creation, naming Alyssa Mastromonaco as the President. At the time, the company announced it would focus on scripted television, documentaries, and limited series.

In 2023, the company's documentary Pretty Baby: Brooke Shields premiered at the Sundance Film Festival. It also received several Emmy Award nominations, including Outstanding Directing for a Documentary for Lana Wilson and Outstanding Picture Editing.

== Filmography ==
- Pretty Baby: Brooke Shields (2023)
