= After Tiller =

- Directed by: Martha Shane; Lana Wilson
- Written by: Lana Wilson; Martha Shane; Greg O'Toole
- Produced by: Martha Shane; Lana Wilson
- Cinematography: Hillary Spera; Emily Topper
- Edited by: Gregory O'Toole
- Music by: Andy Cabic; Eric D. Johnson
- Distributed by: Ro*co
- Release date: January 18, 2013 (Sundance Film Festival)
- Running time: 87 minutes
- Country: United States
- Language: English

After Tiller is a 2013 documentary film directed by Martha Shane and Lana Wilson that follows the only four remaining doctors in the United States who openly perform abortions in the third trimester of pregnancy. In 2015, After Tiller won the News and Documentary Emmy Award for Best Documentary. The title of the film refers to George Tiller, a doctor who performed abortions and was murdered in 2009.

The film was met with a positive response from critics and was an official selection for the 2013 Sundance Film Festival, where it won the Candescent Award. It went on to be nominated for the Independent Spirit Award for Best Documentary, four Cinema Eye Honors, a Satellite Award, and the Ridenhour Prize, and named one of the Top Five Documentaries of the year by the National Board of Review. After Tiller was released in theaters across the US by arthouse distributor Oscilloscope Laboratories.

== Synopsis ==
The film follows the daily work and lives of doctors LeRoy Carhart, Warren Hern, Shelley Sella, and Susan Robinson, the only four doctors in the United States who openly perform 2nd and 3rd trimester abortions after the 2009 assassination of Dr. George Tiller.

== Reception ==
Critical response to After Tiller was positive. It premiered at the 2013 Sundance Film Festival to positive returns, and went on to win the IndieWire Critic's Poll for Best Documentary Feature at Sundance. On Rotten Tomatoes, the film holds a 93% rating based on 59 reviews with an average rating of 7.6/10. The site's critical consensus reads "After Tiller applies empathy, honesty, and graceful understatement to a discussion that all too often lacks them all".

At Sundance, Alissa Simon of Variety gave the film a positive review, calling it "A rare feat… a calm, humanist documentary about a hot-button topic. Well contextualized and sensitively shot with extraordinary access, the pic reflects the personal, moral and ethical struggles of the doctors as well as their patients, and deserves the widest possible audience.” The Hollywood Reporter concurred, with critic Duane Byrge writing that "Whether one is pro-life, pro-choice or without an opinion on the issue, After Tiller provides personal insight into a heart-wrenching, complex reality. The film does not pretend to be an answer to the abortion controversy but rather a presentation of the people who are demonized, correctly or incorrectly, for their actions."

Nick Dawson of Filmmaker magazine called the film "The most compelling and important documentary of the year...a profoundly moving and genuinely inspiring piece of cinema."

A. O. Scott of The New York Times gave the film a positive review and described it as "a partisan document in the culture wars," but said, "It could hardly be otherwise, since the film’s subject, abortion, is one where common ground is elusive, if not philosophically untenable." He concluded his review with an observation shared by other reviewers, noting that "Documentaries can rarely be judged as works of dispassionate, neutral reporting since few of them aspire to uphold those journalistic criteria. Rather, a documentary should be assessed as a representation of the world as it is, from a perspective that is itself part of that world. After Tiller is impressive because it honestly presents the views of supporters of legal abortion, and is thus a valuable contribution to a public argument that is unlikely to end anytime soon." Dorothy J. Samuels of The New York Times Editorial Page wrote on their blog that the film "takes a complicated subject beyond the familiar muck of abstract and often ill-informed talking points to deliver a frank portrayal of the real life situations of the physicians and their desperate patients."

Sara Steward of the New York Post also praised the film and, despite noting that it "likely won’t be seen by anyone not sympathetic to the mission of these four [doctors]," concluded that "After Tiller is groundbreaking in giving voice not only to the doctors, but to those who always seem to get overlooked in the high-volume political debate about this topic: the women themselves."

Keith Uhlich of Time Out viewed the film less favorably, saying that the prospective patient interviews were "unfortunately weakened by the filmmakers’ saccharine touch whenever they explore the doctors’ personal lives" and added, "As After Tiller’s more aesthetically unadorned sections show, Shane and Wilson needn’t have pushed so hard to sell their thesis that this is necessary work." Mike D'Angelo of The A.V. Club gave the film a C+, calling it "an hour and a half of folks on their best behavior, presented as a candid portrait." He added, "The film is more successful when the doctors speak directly to the lens, rather than talking to patients as if the camera isn’t there, and when it directly addresses the question of how to go about doing a job knowing that it may result in being murdered by a fanatic."

== Circumstances of pregnancies ==
Various scenarios are mentioned in individual patient cases such as congenital disorders: arthrogryposis, agenesis of the corpus callosum, Walker–Warburg syndrome, and Mowat–Wilson syndrome.
