= Artemis (brothel) =

Brothel in Berlin

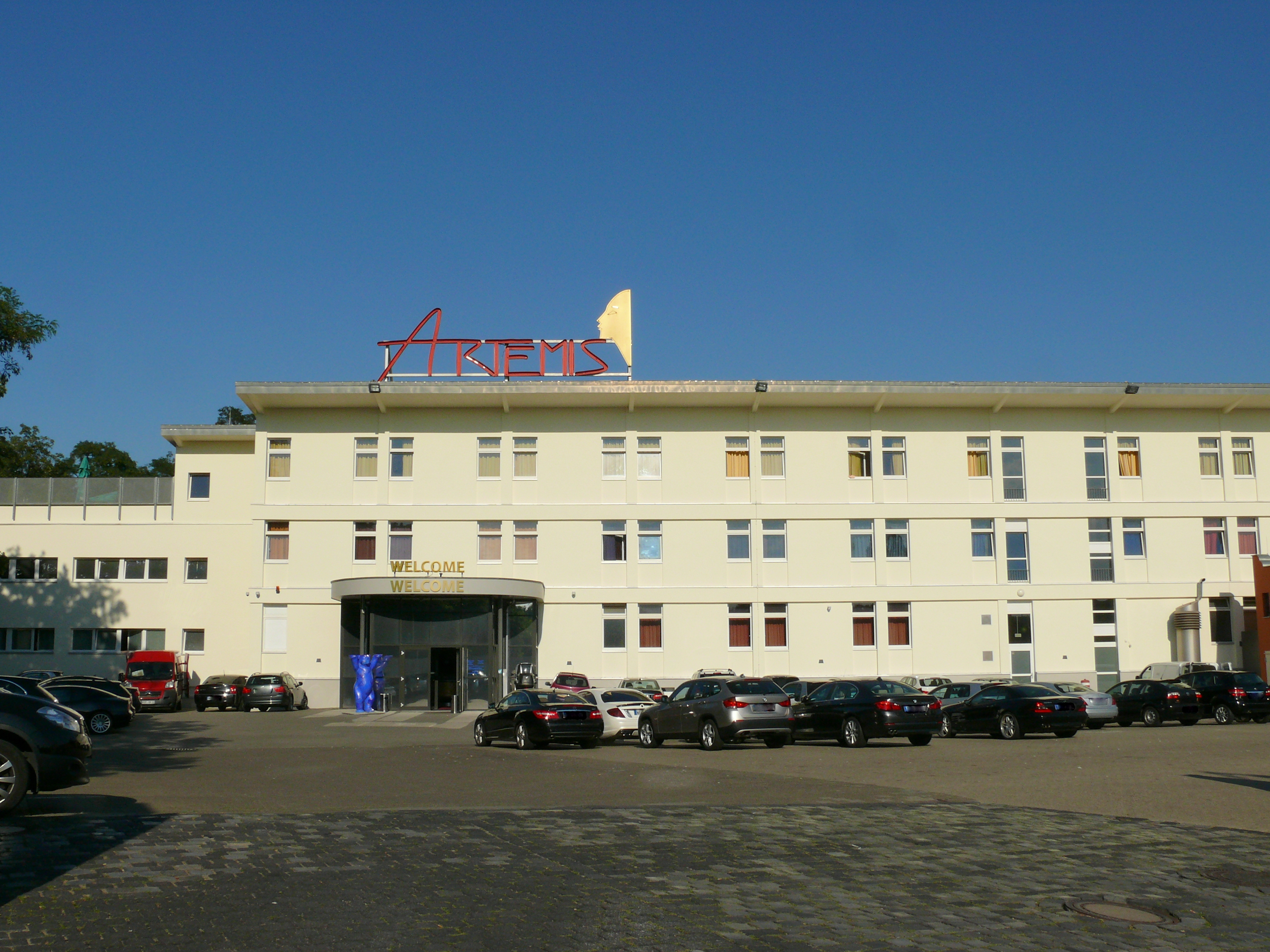
- Artemis brothel
- Interactive map of Artemis
- Address: Halenseestrasse, Halensee
- Location: Berlin, Germany
- Coordinates: 52°29′58″N 13°16′56.4″E
- Owner: Haki Simsek

Construction
- Opened: September 2005
- Cost: €5 million

Website
- www.fkk-artemis.de

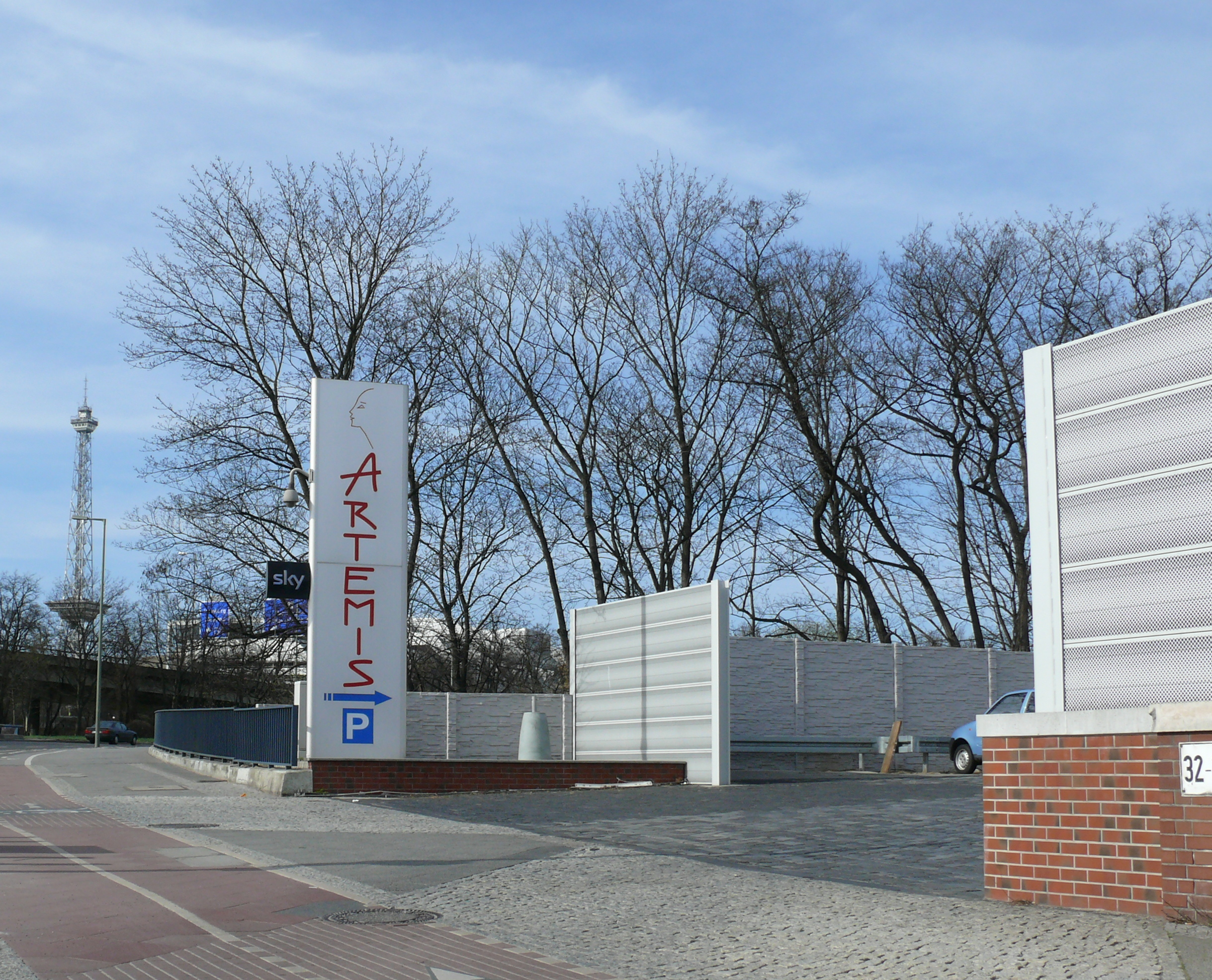
Entrance to Artemis

Artemis is one of the largest brothels in Germany, where prostitution and brothels are legal and widespread. The "wellness" brothel opened in Berlin in September 2005, a four-story building complete with a pool, three saunas, two cinemas, and with room for up to 70 prostitutes and 600 customers.

== Name and location ==
Some newspaper articles have pointed out that the brothel's name is somewhat blasphemous, as Artemis was a goddess in Greek mythology who pledged to remain a chaste virgin.

Artemis is located near the west end of the Kurfürstendamm in an industrial area of Charlottenburg, close to the metro and railway station Westkreuz and about 0.5 km (1,600 ft) south of the ICC congress center. It is a little more than 2 kilometres (1.2 mi) from Berlin's Olympic stadium, famous for hosting the 1936 Olympics and the venue for several games of the 2006 FIFA World Cup.

== Organization and ownership ==
Artemis was created by the Turkish businessman Haki Simsek for about €5 million. Early investment came from German financier Florian Homm. One review in a German online publication wrote "Although the outside of the building is about as erotic as a corporate office park, the interior is a bizarre cross between mid-1990s Las Vegas and a cheesy British 'Carry-On' film."

Artemis is organized as a sauna club, similar to several other German brothels: both customers and prostitutes pay an entry fee and can then use the facilities for 24 hours. The entrance fee is 90 Euros (40 for taxi drivers and pensioners on Sundays and Mondays); half an hour sex costs 70 Euros. Food and non-alcoholic beverages are included in the entry fee. Alcoholic beverages can be purchased at the bar and start at EUR 10 for a beer. Fifty women work on a typical night; they are mostly nude or near nude, except on certain days such as Wednesday, which is "lingerie day". Women work in two shifts, starting at 11 am and 7 pm. Sexual services typically include oral sex without a condom, and sexual intercourse with condoms. The payment is given directly to the women after the act; the house does not receive a cut but regulates the prices and services.

The brothel has 49 employees, in addition to the prostitutes who officially are not employees, but have to follow the house rules regarding services and dresses. Each prostitute pays a pre-tax of 30 Euros per day to the government, which is collected by the brothel. The women are regularly interviewed by officials from the state criminal police office. Prostitutes can stay at the brothel, renting rooms on the fourth floor which is off-limits to customers.

Customers leave about 25 million Euros per year in Artemis, with about half of that money going to the prostitutes. Annual profit of Artemis is estimated at 3 million Euros.

The German prostitute support group Hydra has endorsed the transparent concept but has reserved judgment until the working conditions of the women could be evaluated.

Several comparable clubs exist in Germany, most of them in the area north of Frankfurt. One of them, Atlantis, was closed in 2004 after legal troubles.

== Events and incidents ==
Various news sources reported on Artemis in relation to an expected increase in prostitution in Germany during the 2006 FIFA World Cup. Norman Jacob, the lawyer of the owner, was quoted in one article as saying "Football and sex belong together". On 30 June 2006, The New York Times reported that these expectations had apparently been too optimistic.

In the early morning hours of 17 August 2012, four guests refused to pay their bill at Artemis. One of them drew a gun and shot at the doormen, injuring three of them. The group then fled by car. The gun was a modified alarm gun that shot plastic bullets. A few weeks later, a Russian resident of Berlin was arrested as a suspect in the case.

As part of a campaign to criminalize the purchase of sex, five topless members of the feminist activist organization Femen chained themselves to the entrance of Artemis on 27 November 2013.

=== 2016 raid and aftermath ===
On 14 April 2016, Artemis was raided by 900 police and customs officers investigating human trafficking and tax evasion. The police had obtained information that members of the Hells Angels forced some women to work in Artemis. In 2015 one of these women had talked to the police about her abusive pimp, a former professional football goalie who would be convicted of trafficking, coercion, battery and extortion and sentenced to 7 years in prison in October 2017. The tax evasion charges against Artemis were based on the allegation that the prostitutes working there were fraudulently classified as independent contractors rather than as employees. The brothel reopened the next day but the two managers Hakim and Kenan Simsek and four madams remained in custody. In late July 2016 the Kammergericht ordered their release because of insufficient evidence. Defense lawyers announced plans to sue the state of Berlin for damages, arguing that authorities had approved of the Artemis business practices for years.

The accusations were not proven and the criminal case was rejected by the Berlin Regional Court in 2018. In December 2022, the Berlin Court of Appeal found that prosecutors' comments to the press about the allegations were "culpably in breach of official duties" and ordered the city to pay €100,000 in damages. A second lawsuit for the wrongful detention of the two operators was settled in June 2023 with the city paying them €250,000 as compensation and issuing an apology. The operators indicated that they would use the funds to pay detained female workers and donate the remainder to charity. In 2025 they donated €350,000 to a Berlin children's hospital.

== Expansion ==
In 2009 the Artemis operators bought a warehouse across the street from Artemis, with plans to erect an eight-storied brothel there. These plans were rejected in 2017 by local authorities. A new plan, to turn the warehouse into a brothel with 32 rooms, was also rejected. Artemis sued in 2024 and won.

== See also ==
- Prostitution in Germany

== Further sources ==
- Germany backs bigger brothels to fight World Cup sex explosion, The Independent, 9 December 2005
- World Cup amenity: a 4-story brothel, MSNBC, 30 September 2005
- Brothel to Open Near Berlin Soccer Stadium, Deutsche Welle, 24 September 2005
- "Soccer Fans Will Get a Kick out of Berlin's Latest Brothel". Der Spiegel. 23 September 2005.
- It's going to be an invasion, The Guardian, 18 November 2005
- Eros alla berlinese, L'Espresso, 24 July 2007 (in Italian)
- "Mega-brothel for soccer world cup". The New Zealand Herald. 9 December 2005.
