= Marmato =

- Promotional poster
- Directed by: Mark Grieco
- Written by: Mark Grieco; Stuart Reid
- Produced by: Mark Grieco; Stuart Reid; Harry Swartz-Turfle; Izabel Hoyos
- Cinematography: Mark Grieco
- Edited by: Ricardo Acosta; Mark Grieco
- Music by: Todd Boekelheide
- Production company: Calle Films
- Release date: January 17, 2014 (Sundance)
- Running time: 87 minutes
- Countries: Colombia; United States
- Languages: Spanish; English

Marmato is a 2014 American documentary film written, directed and produced by Mark Grieco. It is the debut feature film of Grieco. The film premiered in competition category of U.S. Documentary Competition program at the 2014 Sundance Film Festival on January 17, 2014, where it won the Candescent Award.

== Synopsis ==
The film narrates 6-years long struggle of townspeople of Marmato, Caldas with Canadian mining company that wants the $20 billion in gold beneath their homes.

== Production ==
Director, Mark Grieco lived and filmed in the town of Marmato over the course of 5 1/2 years from 2008-2013. The entirety of the film takes place in the town except for two scenes in the nearby city of Medellín. Grieco worked alone filming with one camera, the Canon XH-A1. Production was forced to end when it became too dangerous to continue to film in the town.

== Reception ==
The film received positive response from critics. Kenneth Turan in his preview of Sundance 2014 for the Los Angeles Times said that it was among the festival's most memorable films and is "made with exceptional artistry."

Guy Lodge in his review for Variety said that "Mark Grieco's detailed, patient chronicle of a Colombian gold rush is equal parts passion and compassion project."

Mark Adams of Screen International said it is "a striking and vivid story" and "a fascinating glimpse into a tough and resilient community"

Daniel Feinberg in his Sundance review for HitFix called it "one of the best films I've seen in this year's U.S. Documentary Competition" with "compelling and fully realized characters". He goes on to say, "The whole thing is like a Werner Herzog film, man's base desires, juxtaposed with sublime and unconquerable nature"

Jordan M. Smith from Ioncinema gave the film a positive review by saying that "Grieco’s film acts as an advocate for cultural preservation, but in doing he’s unfortunately woven a story as muddled as the conflict it documents."

However, Justin Lowe of The Hollywood Reporter said, "Sympathetic account of beleaguered small-town residents doesn’t muster enough material to prove entirely persuasive."

== Accolades ==
Year	Award	Category	Recipient	Result
2014	Sundance Film Festival	U.S. Grand Jury Prize: Documentary	Mark Grieco	Nominated
2014	Sundance Film Festival	Candescent Award	Mark Grieco	Won
2014	Cartagena Film Festival	Best Documentary Film	Mark Grieco	Won
2014	Cartagena Film Festival	Best Colombian Film	Mark Grieco	Won
2014	Cartagena Film Festival	Audience Award for Best Documentary	Mark Grieco	Won
2014	Seattle International Film Festival	Grand Jury Prize: Best Documentary	Mark Grieco	Won
2014	Ashland Independent Film Festival	Best Editing Feature Documentary	Mark Grieco and Ricardo Acosta	Won
2014	Habana International Film Festival	Special Jury Prize	Mark Grieco	Won
2014	Environmental Film Festival at Yale	Best Environmental Storytelling	Mark Grieco	Won
2014	Astra Film Festival	Eco Cinematography Award	Mark Grieco	Won
2014	Santa Fe Independent Film Festival	Audience Choice Best Documentary Feature	Mark Grieco	Won
2014	Banff Mountain Film Festival	Best Feature Length Mountain Film	Mark Grieco	Won
2015	Sedona International Film Festival	Best Documentary	Mark Grieco	Won
