= Pretty Baby: Brooke Shields =

2023 documentary film by Lana Wilson

- Promotional poster
- Directed by: Lana Wilson
- Produced by: Christine O'Malley; Jack Turner
- Starring: Brooke Shields
- Cinematography: Emily Topper; John Benam
- Edited by: Sara Newens; Anne Yao
- Music by: T. Griffin
- Production companies: ABC News Studios; Bedby8; Matador Content; Drifting Cloud Productions
- Distributed by: Hulu
- Release dates: January 20, 2023 (Sundance); April 3, 2023 (United States)
- Running time: 136 minutes
- Country: United States
- Language: English

Pretty Baby: Brooke Shields is a 2023 American two-part documentary film that follows the life and career of actress and model Brooke Shields from her exploitation as a child star to her later liberation as an adult. It takes its name from Louis Malle's 1978 film Pretty Baby, which Shields starred in at the age of 11. It was directed by Lana Wilson and premiered at the 2023 Sundance Film Festival before being released to Hulu.

== Synopsis ==
Part One documents Shields' beginnings as a child model and her relationship with her mother and manager, Teri Shields. Shields talks about her experiences working on films like Pretty Baby, The Blue Lagoon, and Endless Love, as well as the controversial Calvin Klein ads that sexualized her image. The film follows Shields as she took time away from the spotlight to focus on her academic studies at Princeton University. Shields says during this time she was able to begin embracing her own identity and agency. The film then examines her return to acting and marriage to Andre Agassi.

Part Two examines Shields' own struggles with motherhood and postpartum depression. Shields reflects on whether the culture of misogyny and objectification has become better for young girls.

== Reception ==
Pretty Baby: Brooke Shields received positive reviews. On the review aggregator website Rotten Tomatoes, the film holds an approval rating of 88% based on 43 reviews, with an average rating of 7.1/10. The website's critics consensus reads, "As much an exposé on ugly cultural forces as it is a straightforward presentation of Brooke Shields' life, Pretty Baby is disturbing and triumphant in equal measure."
