= An Invisible Sign =

2010 film by Marilyn Agrelo

- Theatrical release poster
- Directed by: Marilyn Agrelo
- Screenplay by: Pamela Falk; Michael Ellis
- Based on: An Invisible Sign of My Own by Aimee Bender
- Produced by: Pamela Falk; Michael Ellis; Jana Edelbaum; Lynette Howell
- Starring: Jessica Alba; Chris Messina; John Shea; J. K. Simmons
- Cinematography: Lisa Rinzler
- Edited by: Sabine Hoffmann
- Music by: Andrew Hollander
- Production companies: iDeal Partners Films; 120dB Films; Silverwood Films; Kimmel International
- Distributed by: IFC Films
- Release dates: October 7, 2010 (Hamptons Film Festival); May 6, 2011 (United States)
- Running time: 96 minutes
- Country: United States
- Language: English
- Box office: $51,138

An Invisible Sign is a 2010 American drama film directed by Marilyn Agrelo and starring Jessica Alba, Chris Messina, John Shea and J. K. Simmons. Based on the 2001 novel An Invisible Sign of My Own by Aimee Bender, the plot involves a painfully withdrawn young woman who, as a child, turned to math for comfort after her father became ill, and now as an adult, teaches the subject and must help her students through their own crises.

The film received negative reviews from critics, and grossed $51,138 at the box office.

== Plot ==
Mona Gray systematically withdraws from life into a world of mathematics after a mysterious mental illness leaves her father incapacitated and a shell of his former self. Forced by her mother to move out on her own, Mona gets a job as a math teacher at an elementary school. There she discovers she has an unorthodox talent for teaching and finds herself thrust back into life again, with children to care for, and a reason to live. Mona takes special interest in one of her students, Lisa Venus, whose mother is dying of cancer.

When fellow teacher Ben Smith shows romantic interest in her, Mona reverts to some of her old self-destructive impulses. Eventually, Mona discovers her value in the love she shows her students, and she and Ben find love in each other.

== Cast ==
- Jessica Alba as Mona Gray
  - Bailee Madison as Young Mona
- Chris Messina as Ben Smith
- Sônia Braga as Mom
- John Shea as Dad
- J. K. Simmons as Mr. Jones
- Sophie Nyweide as Lisa Venus
- Marylouise Burke as Ms. Gelband
- Ashlie Atkinson as Lisa's Aunt
- Jake Siciliano as Elmer Gravlaki
- Joanna P. Adler as Lisa's mom
- Lilly Hartley as Female Runner

== Production ==
Aimee Bender's 2001 novel An Invisible Sign of My Own was adapted for the screen by The Wedding Planner scribes Michael Ellis and Pamela Falk. Filming locations included Steiner Studios and Tarrytown, New York.

== Release ==
An Invisible Sign premiered at the 18th Hamptons International Film Festival on October 7, 2010. It was released through video on demand on April 1, 2011, and premiered in theaters on May 6, 2011.

== Reception ==
On the review aggregator website Rotten Tomatoes, 0% of 15 critics' reviews are positive, with an average rating of 3.1/10. Metacritic, which uses a weighted average, assigned the film a score of 23 out of 100, based on 7 critics, indicating "generally unfavorable" reviews.

== See also ==
- List of films about mathematicians
