= Citizens' Commission to Investigate the FBI =

Activist group that in 1971 revealed FBI domestic surveillance operations

External videos
- One Veteran's Square, Media, PA
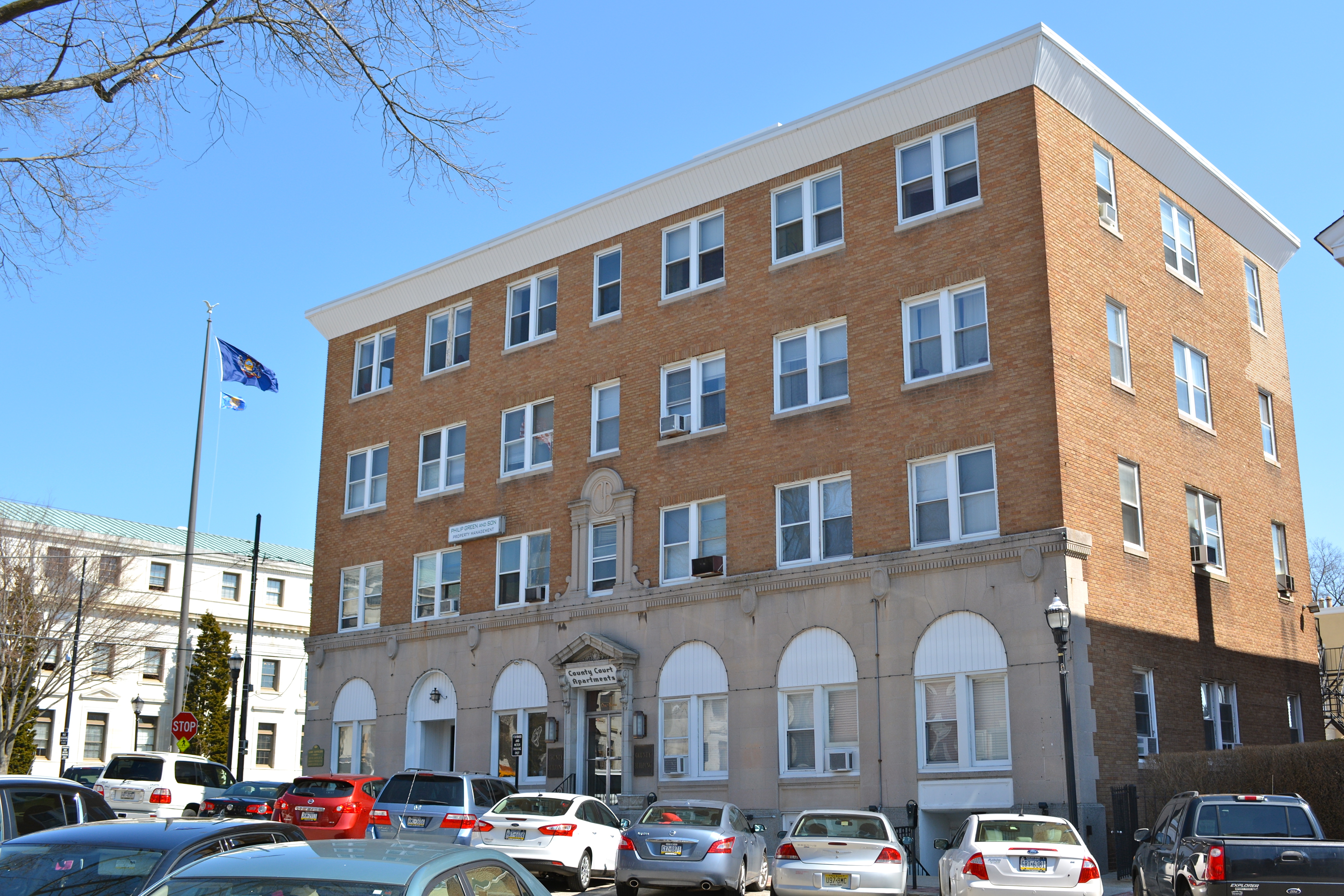
- Stealing J. Edgar Hoover's Secrets, Retro Report, 13:36, January 7, 2014

The Citizens' Commission to Investigate the FBI was an activist group in the United States during the early 1970s. Their only known action was breaking into the field office of the Federal Bureau of Investigation (FBI) located in Media, Pennsylvania on March 8, 1971, and stealing over 1,000 classified documents. Disclosure of these files led to public scrutiny of surreptitious FBI activities and several reforms. None of the eight perpetrators was ever arrested or involuntarily identified.

Following the burglary, selected documents were mailed anonymously to several US newspapers, exposing numerous illegal FBI operations targeting First Amendment-protected activities of U.S. citizens. Most news outlets initially refused to publish the information, saying it related to ongoing operations and that disclosure might have threatened the lives of agents or informants. The Washington Post, after confirming the authenticity of the files, ran a front-page story on March 24, 1971; other media organizations then followed suit.

"The complete collection of political documents ripped off from the F.B.I. office in Media, Pa., March 8, 1971" was published for the first time as the March 1972 issue of WIN Magazine, a journal associated with the War Resisters League. The documents revealed the FBI's secret COINTELPRO operation, resulting in creation by the United States Senate of the Church Committee and the cessation of COINTELPRO. Noam Chomsky has stated:

According to [the Citizens' Commission's] analysis of the documents in this FBI office, 1 percent were devoted to organized crime, mostly gambling; 30 percent were "manuals, routine forms, and similar procedural matter"; 40 percent were devoted to political surveillance and the like, including two cases involving right-wing groups, ten concerning immigrants, and over 200 on left or liberal groups. Another 14 percent of the documents concerned draft resistance and "leaving the military without government permission." The remainder [about 15 percent] concerned bank robberies, murder, rape, and interstate theft.

The theft resulted in the exposure of some of the FBI's most self-incriminating documents, including several detailing the FBI's use of postal workers, switchboard operators, etc., in order to spy on black college students and various non-violent black activist groups.

Some 40 years after their action, some of the perpetrators agreed to go public. In 2014, Betty Medsger's book The Burglary: The Discovery of J. Edgar Hoover's Secret F.B.I. was released, which contains the burglars' description of the burglary and revealed the identities of five of the eight burglars. That same year, filmmaker Johanna Hamilton made a documentary titled 1971 about the group, its action, and the aftermath.

== Members ==
On March 11, 1976, the FBI closed their investigation of the group's actions without conclusively identifying any of the perpetrators. The eight members' identities remained a secret until early 2014, when all seven participants who could be found agreed to be interviewed by journalist Betty Medsger, who was writing a nonfiction book on the event: The Burglary.

Of these seven, five agreed to be publicly identified, including Keith Forsyth, Bonnie Raines, her husband John C. Raines (who, 10 years prior to the burglary, was a member of the Freedom Riders), and Robert "Bob" Williamson. The mastermind and recruiter, William C. Davidon, in 1971 a professor of physics at Haverford College, died in 2013 before the book was published but had authorized revelation of his involvement as well. The other two burglars who were interviewed for the hardcover edition chose to be identified by the pseudonyms "Susan Smith" and "Ron Durst".

The final burglar, Judi Feingold, had, unlike the others, fled across the country in 1971 and could not be found for 43 years. When she learned that the other members of the group were breaking their silence, she contacted Robert Williamson and eventually was interviewed by Medsger as well, which was included in the epilogue to the paperback edition of The Burglary. On March 7, 2021, in recognition of the 50th anniversary of the burglary, Ralph Daniel of San Rafael, California, revealed himself to be "Ron Durst." The last anonymous member, Sara Shumer of Berkeley, California ("Susan Smith" in the book) – in 1971 a political science professor at Haverford (where Davidon taught physics) – disclosed her participation for the first time in 2024 on the Ed Helms podcast, SNAFU.

Several months after the burglary, Forsyth and Williamson were also members of The Camden 28, a separate activist group that broke into a draft board to destroy documents, in an effort to impede the military draft and make an anti-war statement.

== Burglary ==
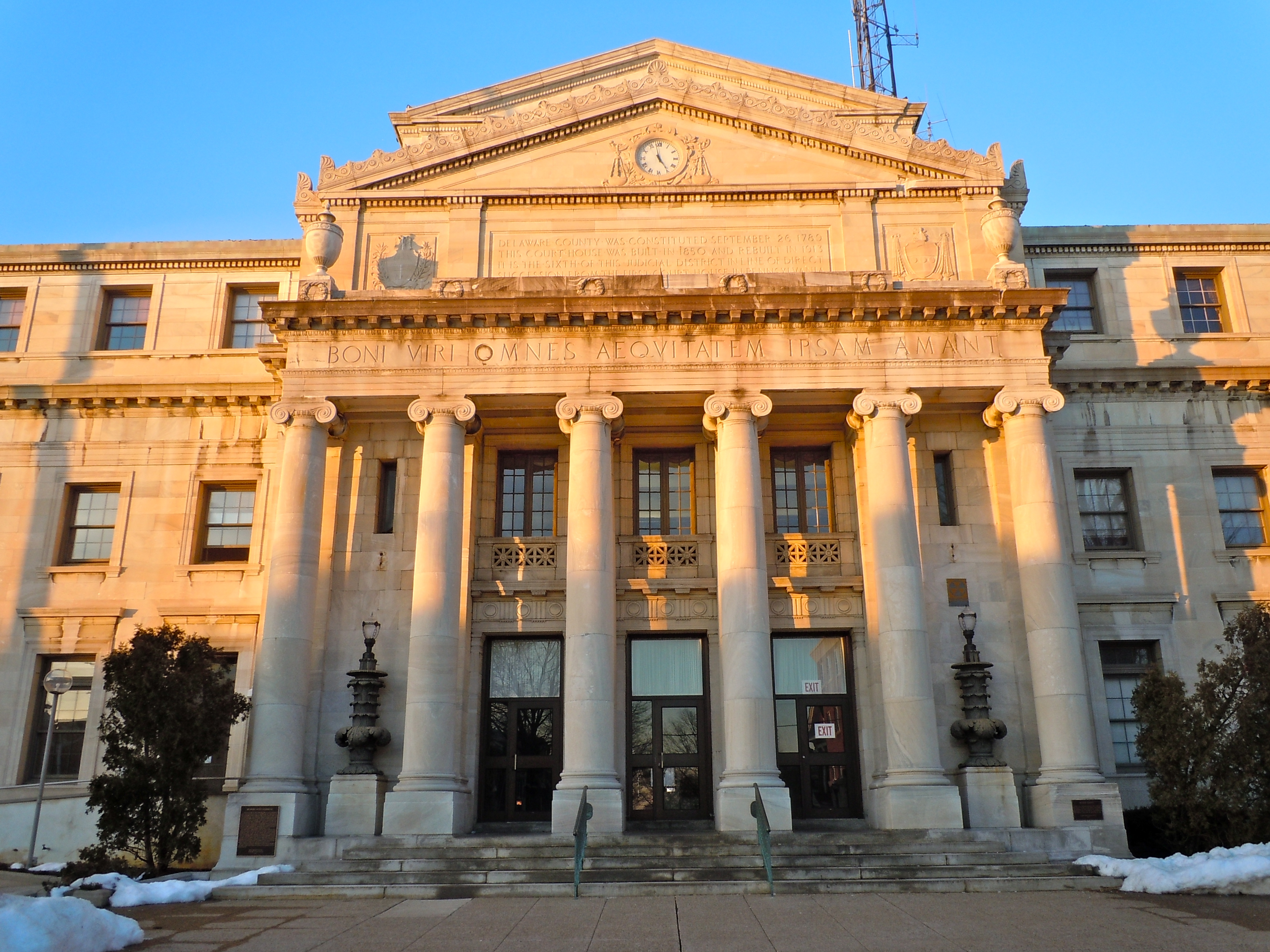
Delaware County Courthouse in Media, Pennsylvania

The burglars did extensive surveillance of the FBI office, to ensure they knew when the office was empty and when the streets were unlikely to have police patrols. The break-in was perpetrated on the day of Joe Frazier and Muhammad Ali's Fight of the Century. The burglars confirmed in subsequent interviews this was done in the hope that the building manager and the residents upstairs would be glued to their radios to hear the summaries of the fight.

While the contracts for the Fight of the Century forbade any live television or radio coverage, there were summaries after each round on the Mutual Broadcasting System on the night of the fight available to the public. Ali was himself a COINTELPRO target due to his involvement with the Nation of Islam and the anti-war movement.

The picture of the office shown in The New York Times' video corresponds to 1 Veterans Sq, Media, PA.

== Statement ==
In a 2014 interview, John Raines said that while returning from the burglary early in the morning, the group had stopped at a pay phone, called a Reuters journalist, and delivered the following statement:

On the night of March 8, 1971, the Citizens' Commission to Investigate the FBI removed files from the Media, Pennsylvania, office of the FBI. These files will now be studied to determine: one, the nature and extent of surveillance and intimidation carried on by this office of the FBI, particularly against groups and individuals working for a more just, humane and peaceful society. Two, to determine how much of the FBI's efforts are spent on relatively minor crimes by the poor and the powerless against whom they can get a more glamorous conviction rate. Instead of investigating truly serious crimes by those with money and influence which cause great damage to the lives of many people—crimes such as war profiteering, monopolistic practices, institutional racism, organized crime, and the mass distribution of lethal drugs. Finally, three, the extent of illegal practices by the FBI, such as eavesdropping, entrapment, and the use of provocateurs and informers.

As this study proceeds, the results obtained along with the FBI documents pertaining to them will be sent to people in public life who have demonstrated the integrity, courage and commitment to democratic values which are necessary to effectively challenge the repressive policies of the FBI.

As long as the United States government wages war against Indochina in defiance of the vast majority who want all troops and weapons withdrawn this year, and extends that war and suffering under the guise of reducing it. As long as great economic and political power remains concentrated in the hands of a small clique not subject to democratic scrutiny and control. Then repression, intimidation, and entrapment are to be expected. We do not believe that this destruction of democracy and democratic society results simply from the evilness, egoism or senility of some leaders. Rather, this destruction is the result of certain undemocratic social, economic and political institutions.

== Investigation ==
The FBI had up to 200 agents working on this case, but it was never solved, and the investigation was closed when the five-year statute of limitations ran out.

The burglars who were considered suspects and who were interviewed by the FBI (including John Raines, Bob Williamson, and Sara Shumer) did not cooperate or confess. Bonnie Raines, despite being the only burglar for whom the FBI had an actual facial composite, was ironically never named as a suspect or interviewed by the FBI. Judi Feingold disappeared into hiding. The FBI intentionally avoided interviewing the leader of the burglars, Bill Davidon, because he was an unindicted co-conspirator in the unrelated Harrisburg Seven case.

The COINTEL memos led, in part, to the creation of the Church Committee which was the predecessor of the Senate Select Committee on Intelligence, which was established by Sen. Frank Church (ID) to provide oversight over and rein in allegations of illegal activities made by federal agencies.

== Documentary film ==
A documentary film about the burglary and its impact titled 1971 was produced by Big Mouth Productions and co-produced by Laura Poitras. It had its world premiere at the Tribeca Film Festival on April 18, 2014.

== In fiction ==
This burglary is one of the historical events fictionalized by James Ellroy in his 2009 novel Blood's a Rover, the third part of his Underworld USA Trilogy.

== See also ==
- 2010s global surveillance disclosures, the 2013 whistleblowing leak by Edward Snowden
- New York Times Co. v. United States, the 1971 case regarding publication of the Pentagon Papers detailing US involvement in the Vietnam War
