= Betty Medsger =

American journalist

Betty Medsger is the former chair of the Department of Journalism and Professor Emerita at San Francisco State University.

== Early life ==
Betty Medsger was born in Johnstown, Pennsylvania, on March 14, 1942, to Alice and Richard Medsger. She obtained a degree from Grove City College in 1964. She obtained a degree from San Francisco State University in 1982.

== Career ==
1964-1966, Medsger was a reporter for The Tribune-Democrat. 1967, Medsger was a medical writer for Temple University. 1967-1969, Medsger was a reporter for Philadelphia Bulletin. 1970-1973, Medsger was a reporter for The Washington Post.

During the 1971 Muhammad Ali - Joe Frazier heavyweight fight, eight burglars stole files from the FBI office in Media, Pennsylvania. In 1971, Medsger, a Washington Post investigative reporter, was a recipient of the FBI files stolen from Media, Pennsylvania.

Medsger worked with The Freedom Forum on A Study of Journalism Education.

== Works ==
Medsger is the author of several books, including The Burglary: The Discovery of J. Edgar Hoover's Secret FBI. Medsger was instrumental in uncovering the work of COINTELPRO and secret activities by the FBI.

== Personal life ==
Betty Medsger was married to Ben Bagdikian. Betty Medsger married John T. Racanelli.

== See also ==
- Citizens' Commission to Investigate the FBI
- 1971 (2014 film)
