= Generation Wealth =

2018 documentary film by Lauren Greenfield

- Directed by: Lauren Greenfield
- Written by: Lauren Greenfield
- Produced by: Frank Evers; Wallis Annenberg; Lauren Greenfield
- Starring: Limo Bob; Florian Homm; Tiffany Masters; Jackie Siegel; Bobby Strauser
- Cinematography: Robert Chappell; Lauren Greenfield; Shana Hagan; Jerry Risius; Lars Skree
- Edited by: Victor Livingston; Dan Marks; Aaron Wickenden; Michelle Witten
- Music by: Jeff Beal
- Production companies: Evergreen Pictures; JustFilms - Ford Foundation; Cinereach; Artemis Rising Foundation; Candescent Films
- Distributed by: Amazon Studios
- Release dates: January 18, 2018 (Sundance); July 20, 2018 (United States)
- Running time: 106 minutes
- Country: United States
- Language: English

Generation Wealth is a 2018 American documentary film directed by Lauren Greenfield. It follows Greenfield's 2017 book and photo exhibition of the same name.

== Release ==
Generation Wealth was selected to be the opening night film at the 2018 Sundance Film Festival in the Documentary Premiere program. The film received its European premiere at the Berlin International Film Festival (aka Berlinale 68), where it was featured in the Panorama program. Other festivals include SXSW and CPH:DOX. The film was distributed by Amazon Studios and released in theaters on July 20, 2018.

== Reception ==
On review aggregator website Rotten Tomatoes, the film holds an approval rating of 46% based on 99 reviews. The website's critical consensus reads, "Generation Wealth has admirable aims, but never manages to focus long enough to put together the type of cogent argument made by director Lauren Greenfield's earlier works." 19 out of 35 reviews by top critics on Rotten Tomatoes were negative.

Nick Allen of RogerEbert.com wrote that the film was "a stunningly deeply resonant documentary about notions as seemingly obvious as the value of love over wealth itself." Jeannette Catsoulis of The New York Times wrote, "Darting from micro to macro and back again, squashing obscene consumption against child beauty pageants and ruinous debt, its structure makes for an unfocused thesis," adding that "the through line... works." Joseph Walsh of Time Out gave it four out of five stars, writing that the film "lays bare society’s obsession with affluence and excess with scalpel-sharp insight" and "makes for bleak and compelling viewing." Joe Morgan's Wall Street Journal review stated that the film was "all over the place, to the point of inducing numbness or suffocation." In The Independent, Geoffrey McNabb wrote:"... director Lauren Greenfield is a brilliant photographer but her film is all over the place."

The film was nominated for Best Documentary Screenplay from the Writers Guild of America.
