= Florian Homm =

German businessman (born 1959)

Florian Wilhelm Jürgen Homm
- Born: 7 October 1959 (age 66); Oberursel
- Occupations: German former businessman and investment manager

Florian Wilhelm Jürgen Homm (born 7 October 1959 in Oberursel) is a former German investment banker and hedge fund manager.

Absolute Capital Management (ACM), a hedge fund managed by Homm, once reached a volume of up to three billion US dollars, but collapsed in 2007. Investors are said to have lost 200 million US dollars. Charged with investment fraud in the U.S., he disappeared in 2007. The FBI, SEC and DEA put him on the wanted list. He was arrested in Italy in 2013 after hints from the FBI and faced extradition to the United States. He was subsequently released and currently resides in Germany. He has not been extradited despite a warrant from the U.S. and Switzerland because Germany, like the U.S. and many other countries, does categorically not extradite its own citizens to foreign countries. The only exceptions are in the case European Arrest Warrants, whereby a citizen may be extradited to another EU country only, or arrest warrants by an international court that Germany is a member of, whereby a citizen may be extradited to the location of the court for the purposes of a trial (Art. 16 GG).

Homm was a featured interviewee in the 2018 documentary feature Generation Wealth.

== Early life ==
Florian Wilhelm Jürgen Homm was born on 7 October 1959 in Oberursel, a small town near Frankfurt, Germany. His father was self made and had set up a large business including that of welding pipes and installing bathroom fittings, something that did not interest young Florian. Instead, Florian was influenced by his great uncle Josef Neckermann, a successful businessman at whose mansion the entire family would attend weekly gatherings every Sunday. In an interview with Deutsche Welle (DW), Homm described being impressed by his great uncle and with the idea of being wealthy. Homm attended high school in the United States, at Bentley High School (Livonia, Michigan). He subsequently entered Harvard College, graduating in 1982. He then earned an MBA from Harvard Business School in 1987. Homm worked for Merrill Lynch, Fidelity Investments and Julius Bär.

== Investment activities ==
Homm began his working career in finance at Merrill Lynch and thereafter worked for Fidelity Investments and Julius Bär before founding his own company. In an interview with DW describing his early impressions of the finance industry, Homm described that he was never interested in the mathematical formulae behind investing. He felt that institutions were taking the wrong approach and needed to take a more holistic approach to investing in stocks.

At Fidelity, Homm worked for and trained under fund manager Peter Lynch. He returned to Frankfurt where he served as the senior vice president at the German division of Julius Bär. In 1993, Homm founded his own company Value Management & Research AG (VMR) in Frankfurt. His company went public in 1998 and made most of its fortune in the period from 1998 to 2000. By December 1999, the company's value had risen seven-fold, while the dot com bubble was getting inflated. He drew attention due to his personal charm, brashness and glamour, with some of his stocks known informally as "Homm stocks".

In 2004 he invested in stock of the German soccer club Borussia Dortmund, through his Cayman Island-based company. With a financial commitment of 20 million euros, he basically saved the club and also contributed to the overthrow of the club management by means of the conditions attached to the payment.

In 2005 he co-founded Absolute Capital Management Holdings (ACMH), a hedge-fund company incorporated in the Cayman Islands, which was listed on the Alternative Investment Market of the London Stock Exchange. During this time, Homm enjoyed a great deal of media attention due to the high yields of the hedge fund and was named Hedge Fund Leader of The Year by the investment magazine Alternative Investment News. ACMH managed around three billion euros at the peak of this period.

According to his autobiography, Homm in 2006 profitably invested in the Berlin brothel Artemis.

Homm again gained much media attention in 2007 when he demanded that the German telecommunications provider freenet AG be split up. In addition, he also took a stake in the TUI travel agency.

== Resignation, charges and pursuit ==
In September 2007, Homm abruptly announced his resignation as the head of Absolute Capital Management and disappeared.

After his resignation, Homm was accused by the remaining management of his company of having valued many of the assets much higher than their actual value. He was supposedly on the run with over 150 million euro. The Absolute Capital Management stock lost 93% of its value up until June 2008.

On 25 February 2011, the US Securities and Exchange Commission (SEC) filed civil charges against Florian Homm and Todd M. Ficeto. According to the complaint, Homm's various companies engaged in secretly coordinated bogus trades of penny stocks to drive up the stocks' prices and thereby the value of his hedge fund, a technique known as "portfolio pumping".

On 6 March 2013, Homm was criminally charged with investment fraud in federal court in Los Angeles. According to the complaint, he had caused $200 million in losses. On 8 March, he was arrested in Florence, Italy, where he had gone to meet his ex-wife and son, who live in Florida. The Italian police had been tipped off by the FBI.

Homm's lawyers fought extradition by pointing to his suffering from multiple sclerosis. After an expert testified that the disease was at an early to intermediate stage and did not prevent incarceration, the Court of Cassation in Rome ruled on 9 January 2014 that he could be extradited. On 23 June 2014, Homm was released from prison in Italy, after a court ruled that the period he could be held for extradition had expired. He returned to his native Germany. Germany does not extradite German citizens.

== Books ==
In 2012, as part of the planned publication of his book (English title: Rogue Financier), whose profit is being donated by Homm to the Liberia Renaissance Foundation – a Swiss charitable association aimed at improving the education and opportunities for advancement of Liberian school children –, Florian Homm took part in interviews with the German publications Süddeutsche Zeitung, Stern and the Frankfurter Allgemeine Zeitung on 7 November 2012, in which he described his rise, fall and new start. On the same day, the Financial Times Deutschland and the German economic magazine Wirtschaftswoche published an interview in which he denied most of the accusations against him.

Parallel to articles in The New York Times and Financial Times, in which he spoke about his return to Germany, Homm published his book in English (title: Rogue Financier). Meanwhile, in Germany, in the week beginning on 19 November 2012, his autobiography was 27th in the Spiegel best-seller list, 11th in the Manager Magazine best-seller list January 2013, and was listed as one of the 35 best non-fiction books in 2012 by LovelyBooks – the largest online German literary portal. It was also among the top 40 best-selling books of the year in the Manager Magazine's business-book best-seller list, 2012

- Florian Homm: Kopf Geld Jagd. FinanzBuch Verlag, München 2012, ISBN 978-3-89879-788-7
- Florian Homm: Rogue Financier: The adventures of an Estranged Capitalist. FinanzBuch Verlag, München 2012, ISBN 978-3-86248-425-6
- Florian Homm: 225 Years in Hell: The Conversion of a Rogue Financier, FinanzBuch Verlag, München 2016

== Personal life ==
His great uncle is the former German mail-order tycoon, dressage competitor, and sports functionary Josef Neckermann.

Florian Homm is 200 cm tall and a former German junior national league basketball player. In the mid-1980s, he played basketball in the German national league for the Osnabrücker BC Giants club.

Florian Homm is one of the founders of the global health initiative Maximum Impact Medicine, dedicated to fighting life-threatening diseases in third world countries.

He was first diagnosed with multiple sclerosis in 2000; his sister died from the disease in 2006.

Since his release from Italian prison in June 2014, Homm speaks openly about his Catholic faith and conversion. He spoke at the College for Applied Management (Hochschule für Angewandtes Management, Erding) in front of approximately 300 students in November 2014. Homm has been interviewed extensively on his lifestyle change and conversion. He expresses his devotion to the Holy Mother and his mission in a YouTube video. Homm says his life is dedicated to make a little book containing messages of the Holy Mother better known. Homm states these inspiring messages changed and saved his life during prison in Italy. Due to his unique way of telling his story, he has achieved a certain prominence in Germany, especially through YouTube where he also became a meme.
