= Nas: Time Is Illmatic =

- Theatrical release poster
- Directed by: One9
- Written by: Erik Parker
- Produced by: One9; Erik Parker; Anthony Saleh
- Starring: Nas; Jabari Jones; Olu Dara
- Cinematography: Frank Larson
- Edited by: David Zieff; One9; John Kanellidis
- Music by: B. Satz
- Production company: Illa Films
- Distributed by: Tribeca Films
- Release dates: April 16, 2014 (Tribeca Film Festival); October 1, 2014 (worldwide)
- Running time: 74 minutes
- Country: United States
- Box office: $164,540

Nas: Time Is Illmatic is a 2014 documentary film directed by One9 and produced by One9, Erik Parker and Anthony Saleh. The film recounts the circumstances leading up to Nas' 1994 debut album Illmatic. Released on the 20th anniversary of Illmatic, the film includes interviews with Nas, his brother and father, and figures from the East Coast hip hop scene. Nas: Time Is Illmatic premiered during the opening night of the 2014 Tribeca Film Festival, on April 16, 2014. The project received a grant from Tribeca All Access and additional funding from the Ford Foundation.

== Reception ==
Nas: Time Is Illmatic received positive reviews from most critics. The film's Metacritic score is 72/100 based on 14 critical reviews, and its Rotten Tomatoes score is 98%, with an average rating of 7.30/10 based on 41 reviews. The documentary was a recipient of a Candescent Award. Nas: Time Is Illmatic was considered by Variety magazine to be a likely contender to be nominated for the Academy Award for Best Documentary Feature, but did not receive a nomination.

== See also ==
- East Coast hip hop
- Illmatic
- List of films with a 100% rating on Rotten Tomatoes
