= The Departure (2017 film) =

Lana Wilson documentary

- Directed by: Lana Wilson
- Produced by: Lana Wilson
- Cinematography: Emily Topper
- Edited by: David Teague
- Music by: Nathan Michel
- Production companies: Drifting Cloud Productions; Roast Beef Productions; ITVS; Candescent Films; Artemis Rising Foundation
- Release date: April 2017
- Country: United States
- Language: Japanese

The Departure is a 2017 American documentary by Lana Wilson. It concerns suicide in Japan. The film premiered at the 2017 Tribeca Film Festival in New York. It was nominated for a 2018 Independent Spirit Award for Best Documentary.
