= Lana Wilson =

American filmmaker (born 1983)

- Born: August 9, 1983 (age 43); Edmonds, Washington
- Occupation: Filmmaker
- Awards: News & Documentary Emmy Award (2015); NARAL Champion of Choice Award (2014); MacDowell Fellowship (2017); Yaddo Fellowship (2018); National Board of Review Top 5 Documentaries for After Tiller (2013); National Board of Review Top 5 Documentaries for Miss Americana (2020); National Board of Review Top 5 Documentaries for Look Into My Eyes (film) (2024); Sundance Institute Women at Sundance Fellow (2017); Chicken & Egg Pictures Award (2019)

Lana Wilson is an American filmmaker. She directed the feature documentaries After Tiller, The Departure, Miss Americana, and Look into My Eyes, as well as the two-part documentary Pretty Baby: Brooke Shields. The first two films were nominated for the Independent Spirit Award for Best Documentary.

== Life and career ==
Originally from Kirkland, Washington, Wilson graduated from Lake Washington High School in 2001.

She received a BA from Wesleyan University, where she majored in film studies and dance. Before becoming a director, Wilson was the film and dance curator for Performa, the New York biennial of new visual art performance.

=== After Tiller ===
Wilson's first film After Tiller follows the four most-targeted abortion providers in the country. It premiered at the Sundance Film Festival in 2013 and was picked up by arthouse distributor Oscilloscope Laboratories. The film was released in theaters in fall 2013, and received critical acclaim for taking a complex and compassionate look at one of the most challenging issues of our time. It holds a 95% positive rating on Rotten Tomatoes, with the consensus, "After Tiller applies empathy, honesty, and graceful understatement to a discussion that all too often lacks them all."

In 2015 After Tiller won the News and Documentary Emmy Award for Best Documentary. It was also nominated for the Independent Spirit Award for Best Documentary, four Cinema Eye Honors, a Satellite Award, and the Ridenhour Prize, and was named one of the Top Five Documentaries of the Year by the National Board of Review.

=== The Departure ===
Wilson's second film, The Departure, is about a Japanese punk rocker-turned-Buddhist priest who works to prevent suicide in Japan. In the film the priest confronts his own mortality. The Departure premiered at the 2017 Tribeca Film Festival and was picked up by distributor FilmRise. In fall 2017 it was released in US theaters to extensive critical acclaim. In 2018, it was nominated for the Independent Spirit Award for Best Documentary. The Washington Post wrote that the film "explores life's toughest and most transcendent moments with tenderness, honesty, and care". The San Francisco Chronicle called it "a beautiful meditation on the value of life" and "a work of art". On review aggregator Rotten Tomatoes the film holds a 100% approval rating. On Metacritic, the film has a weighted average score of 85 out of 100.

=== Miss Americana ===
Wilson's third documentary, Miss Americana, follows American singer-songwriter Taylor Swift and her life over the course of several years of her career. After premiering at the 2020 Sundance Film Festival, the film received praise and a standing ovation from the audience. Miss Americana is described as an "intimate", "empowering", "genuine" and "funny" documentary by critics, who complimented Wilson's direction, portraying Swift's creative process and discussions on issues such as eating disorder, self esteem and sexual assault. It became the highest-rated Netflix-original biographical documentary film in IMDb history. On review aggregator website Rotten Tomatoes, the film has an approval rating of 93% based on 72 reviews, with an average rating of 7.59/10. On Metacritic, it has a weighted average score of 65 out of 100, based on 23 critics. The film is a New York Times "Critic's Pick" and an IndieWire "Critic's Pick".

Wesley Morris of The New York Times described Miss Americana as "85 minutes of translucence" with Swift, stating that she is "self-critical, grown up and ready, perhaps, to deliver a message beyond the music". David Ehrlich of IndieWire called the film "thrilling" and "enormously winsome", writing that "its power is in watching someone who stands astride the world gradually realize that their art is the only thing they can control". Hannah Woodhead of Little White Lies wrote that the film offers "unprecedented access to the notoriously private singer and her dizzying world" through "interviews, studio footage, home videos and concert recordings". In a 2020 interview with FF2 Media, Wilson herself recalls that as a storyteller, her favorite thing to film was Swift's creative process. Wilson stated that the toughest part of the project was building trust with Swift, as she hadn't been interviewed in three years. Miss Americana was named one of the five best documentaries of the year by the National Board of Review.

=== Pretty Baby: Brooke Shields ===
Wilson's next project, the 2023 two-part documentary series Pretty Baby: Brooke Shields, examined actor, model, and icon Brooke Shields. The film uses archival material and interviews with Shields, friends and colleagues, and cultural commentators to explore Shields’ complex relationship with her mother Teri, her marriage to Andre Agassi, and her own struggles with motherhood. Pretty Baby: Brooke Shields premiered at the 2023 Sundance Film Festival, then broke viewership records when it launched on Hulu and Disney+. Upon release, the film received positive reviews from critics, earning a “Certified Fresh” designation on review aggregator website Rotten Tomatoes, which said, “An exposé of ugly cultural forces, Pretty Baby is disturbing and triumphant in equal measure.” It was named a New York Times “Critics’ Pick,” with Natalia Winkelman writing that it “suggests a generation of women transformed by the prototypes society boxed them into.” Writing in Variety, Owen Gleiberman called the film, “Supremely well-crafted...a documentary of fascinating depth that holds our voyeuristic image culture up to the light.” He additionally notes that “Lana Wilson's accomplished film traces how Brooke Shields's career was at the forefront of our culture's sexualization of girls, and shows what it was like for her to live a life inside that image.” Marlow Stern in Rolling Stone called Pretty Baby: Brooke Shields “extraordinary,” and Katey Rich in Vanity Fair called it “intimate and unflinching.”

Pretty Baby: Brooke Shields was nominated for two Primetime Emmy Awards: Outstanding Directing for a Documentary/Nonfiction Program, and Outstanding Picture Editing for a Nonfiction Program. Pretty Baby: Brooke Shields was also nominated for a Critic's Choice Award. It won the 2024 Cinema Eye Honor for Best Broadcast Editing, and was nominated for the 2024 Cinema Eye Honor for Best Broadcast Film.

=== Look Into My Eyes ===
Wilson's film Look into My Eyes is a 2024 feature documentary centered on a group of New York City psychics who conduct deeply intimate readings for their clients. The film was made with A24 and premiered at the 2024 Sundance Film Festival, where it received widespread critical acclaim. The New York Times, The Washington Post, Rolling Stone, and Harper's Bazaar each named it one of the best films at the festival. Writing in Sight and Sound, Nicolas Rapold noted that “The genius of Lana Wilson's portrait of New York City psychics is that she doesn't ask us to believe, but to feel,” calling the film “an exquisitely made documentary that puts compassion before cynicism.” The New York Times critic Alissa Wilkinson called Look Into My Eyes “mystical,” “marvelously nuanced," and "fascinating,” and IndieWire chief film critic David Ehrlich described it as “a sensitive and surprising film about the relationship between shared performance and private pain.”

Additional reviews highlighted the film’s emotional resonance and Wilson’s distinctive approach. The New York Times named it a Critic’s Pick, describing it as “profoundly sad and surprisingly hopeful,” while Rolling Stone praised Wilson’s “complicated, compassionate film” for revealing that “people need to be told that they’re forgiven, they’re loved, and they can let go and move on from trauma.” Vanity Fair wrote that the film “signals an exciting step forward for Wilson, as she expands her gaze toward an entire community,” and The Washington Post emphasized how it explores “the grief and humanity of those who are left behind.” The Wall Street Journal called the film “marvelous…sensitive and serious,” while Slate described it as “incredible,” observing that “its subjects are looking at us, too, asking what fictions we use to keep ourselves sane.”

=== Shorts and other work ===
Wilson's short-form web series, A Cure for Fear, goes inside the radical treatments of Dutch neuroscientist Dr. Merel Kindt as she seeks to treat fears ranging from severe animal phobias to PTSD. The series explores the ethically complex grounds of curing our most human ailment. It played at South by Southwest and the Camden International Film Festival and was nominated for an International Documentary Association Award for Best Short-Form Series.

=== Recognition and retrospectives ===
In 2024, the Museum of the Moving Image in New York presented a retrospective of Wilson’s work. The series, titled Come Alive: The Films of Lana Wilson, showcased her body of work and included in-person discussions about her approach to nonfiction filmmaking. In the program’s description, the museum called Wilson “one of the most compelling and accomplished filmmakers of her generation,” citing her ability to “reveal the deeply human dimensions of complex subjects” with “emotional intelligence and formal precision.”

Wilson has been a MacDowell Fellowship, a Yaddo Fellow, and a visiting assistant professor at Pratt Institute.

== Themes ==
IndieWire describes Wilson as "a singularly perceptive filmmaker whose documentary work has always focused on the various ways that pain can web people together - if only because it can't be exorcised alone." Profiling Wilson in the inaugural issue, Doxx magazine says that Wilson "asks philosophical questions about life and death, and observes the struggles that may yield their elusive answers".

Writing in The Moveable Fest, Stephen Saito says that “the director has a knack for inviting audiences into private worlds very different from one another...whether the abortion clinic in After Tiller, the practice of a Zen Buddhist who talks people away from suicide in The Departure, or an audience with Taylor Swift in Miss Americana, the settings may be different, but the animating idea behind them has largely been the same as [Wilson has] accompanied subjects through confronting their biggest fears and usually, with the help of another, finding their way through.”

== Influences ==
Wilson has cited many influences for her work, including Rainer Werner Fassbinder, Frederick Wiseman, Lixin Fan, Heddy Honigmann, and William Wyler. She has said that all filmmakers should see Stan Brakhage's Dog Star Man and Jacques Tati's Playtime.

== Filmography ==
=== Feature films ===
| Year | Film | Director | Producer | Writer | Other | Notes |
|---|---|---|---|---|---|---|
| 2013 | After Tiller | Yes | Yes | Yes | | 2015 Emmy Winner |
| 2017 | The Departure | Yes | Yes | Yes | | |
| 2020 | Miss Americana | Yes | Yes | Yes | | On Netflix |
| 2023 | Pretty Baby: Brooke Shields | Yes | | | | Two-part documentary |
| 2024 | Look into My Eyes | Yes | Yes | | | |

=== Series ===
- A Cure for Fear (director/producer) – a 4-episode short-form series for First Look Media's Topic, launched October 2018
- National Geographic I Am Rebel documentary series premiere episode "Jacked" (writer/producer) – concerning the Southern Airways Flight 49 highjacking, aired June 5, 2016

== Awards ==
After Tiller won a News & Documentary Emmy Award for Best Documentary in September, 2015. Wilson was awarded the "Champion of Choice Award" by NARAL Pro-Choice America in 2014 for her work on the film.

Wilson was selected by Sundance Institute as a Women at Sundance Fellow in 2017.
