= 1971 (2014 film) =

American film by Johanna Hamilton

- Directed by: Johanna Hamilton
- Written by: Johanna Hamilton; Gabriel Rhodes
- Produced by: Marilyn Ness; Katy Chevigny; Abigail Disney; Gabriella Hearst; Laura Poitras; Julie Goldman; Lilly Hartley
- Music by: Philip Sheppard
- Production companies: Big Mouth Productions; Fork Films; Motto Productions
- Distributed by: First Run Features
- Release date: April 18, 2014 (Tribeca)
- Running time: 80 minutes
- Country: United States
- Language: English

1971 is a 2014 American documentary film and the directorial debut of producer Johanna Hamilton, who also co-wrote the film. The film had its world premiere on 18 April 2014 at the Tribeca Film Festival and focuses on the break-in of an FBI office in Media, Pennsylvania on Monday, March 8, 1971, to steal over 1000 classified documents. It was pitched at the Sheffield Doc/Fest 2011 MeetMarket preceding its debut. The break-in took place on the night of the first Ali-Frazier boxing title fight dubbed the Fight of the Century.

Hamilton was inspired to create the film after learning that Betty Medsger was working on her book The Burglary: The Discovery of J. Edgar Hoover’s Secret FBI, which discussed the 1971 events and revealed the identities of many of the participants, who had remained anonymous up to that point.

== Synopsis ==
The film focuses on the events of March 8, 1971, when eight people orchestrated the burglary and public distribution of government files from an FBI office in Media, Pennsylvania. The theft was altogether different than the numerous contemporary draft board office break-ins, in which activists (including many of the burglars) burned government draft paperwork to interfere with America's continued participation in the Vietnam War. The group, all of whom were ordinary citizens, called themselves the Citizens' Commission to Investigate the FBI and stole every relevant file in the office. The goal of the burglars was to gather tangible evidence of government surveillance of civilian political activists, which was infringing on First Amendment rights. The stolen files exposed that the FBI was indeed running extensive, illegal operations intended to spread paranoia and distrust among numerous New Left and black civil rights organizations. (Other files included training manuals, information about organized crime, and information about draft resistance.) Over time, the group mailed copies of the files to various newsrooms. Most news organizations returned the files to the FBI and refused to run stories regarding the stolen documents, but the notable exception was The Washington Post, which ran a front-page story on March 24, 1971, about the files which were mailed to journalist Betty Medsger. Arguably the most significant element in the stolen materials turned out to be a single file mentioning "COINTELPRO", a secret surveillance program that was run by J. Edgar Hoover. Subsequent investigations and freedom of information requests regarding COINTELPRO played a role in the 1975 Church Committee.

== Reception ==
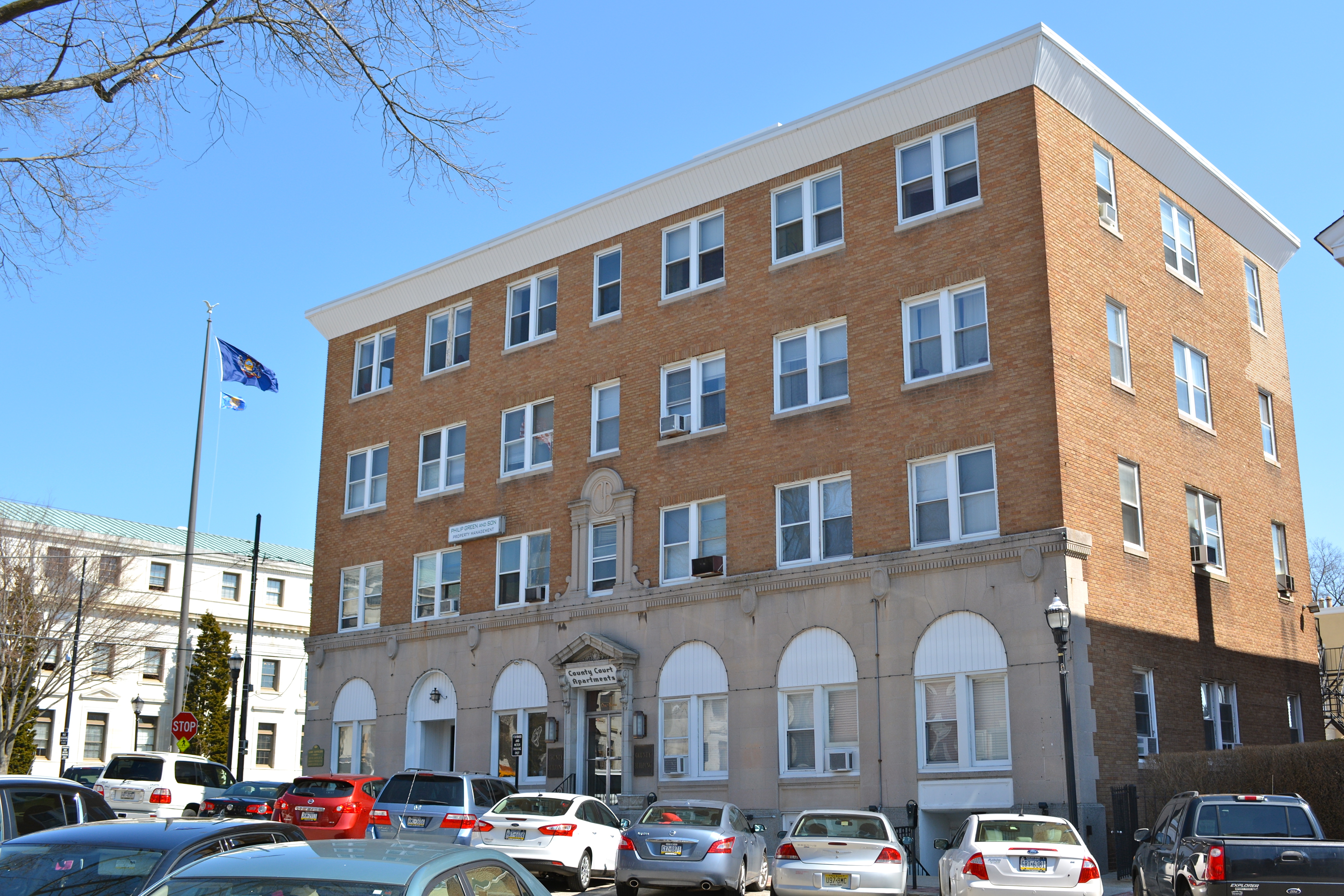
Site of the 1971 break-in in Media, Pennsylvania

Critical reception for 1971 has been positive. Washingtonian and Variety both praised the work, which the Washingtonian described as "a compelling documentary that provides a powerful perspective on the current debate about the men and women who risk everything to disclose government secrets." Indiewire also gave a favorable review, praising Hamilton's directing and stated "Her film is not celebratory, lingering on the notion that, with the public charade of COINTELPRO, ultimately the FBI won. While their post-break-in behaviors are mocked, the government credits itself with tactics specifically utilized to "enhance the paranoia," creating a culture of fear that still exists today."

== See also ==
- List of films featuring surveillance
