= Trophy (film) =

- Theatrical release poster
- Directed by: Shaul Schwarz; Christina Clusiau
- Produced by: Lauren Haber; Julia Nottingham
- Cinematography: Christina Clusiau; Shaul Schwarz
- Edited by: Halil Efrat; Jay Arthur Sterrenberg
- Music by: Jeremy Turner; Erick Lee
- Production companies: CNN Films; Impact Partners; Pulse Films; Reel Peak Films; The Long Run; 19340 Productions; BBC Storyville; Chicago Media Project; Candescent Films; Influence Film
- Distributed by: The Orchard
- Release date: 2017
- Countries: United Kingdom; United States

Trophy is a 2017 documentary film about trophy hunting and wildlife conservation. After airing on CNN, it was nominated for an Emmy for Outstanding Nature Documentary at the 40th News and Documentary Emmy Award.
