= North Carolina Highway 35 =

State highway in North Carolina, US

North Carolina Highway 35

Route information
- Maintained by NCDOT
- Length: 20.5 mi (33.0 km)
- Existed: 1940–present

Major junctions
- South end: NC 305 / NC 561 near Woodland
- US 258 in Woodland; US 158 in Conway
- North end: SR 35 at the Virginia state line near Severn

Location
- Country: United States
- State: North Carolina
- Counties: Hertford, Northampton

Highway system
- North Carolina Highway System; Interstate; US; State; Scenic
← NC 34	→ NC 36

North Carolina Highway 35 (NC 35) is a primary state highway in the U.S. state of North Carolina.

== Route description ==
Starting from its southern terminus at NC 305/NC 561 near Tri-County Airport in Mintons Store of western Hertford County, the route immediately enters Northampton County as it progresses northward. In the town of Woodland, NC 35 joins US 258 as Woodland's main street, before turning north again only a couple city blocks later. The road continues north through the towns of Conway and Severn before it turns into Virginia State Route 35 at the Virginia state line. Much of the route runs mostly parallel to the North Carolina and Virginia Railroad and crosses it several times.

== History ==
Originally, NC 35 was created around 1930 as the route that present-day NC 45 follows from US 13 to US 17. However, Virginia renumbered its routes in 1940, and North Carolina followed suit to remain consistent.

== Major intersections ==
County	Location	mi	km	Destinations	Notes
Hertford		0.0	0.0	NC 305 / NC 561 – Rich Square, Aulander, Ahoskie	
Northampton	Woodland	3.4	5.5	US 258 south (Main Street) – Rich Square	South end of concurrency with US 258
Northampton	Woodland	3.6	5.8	US 258 north (Main Street) – Murfreesboro	North end of concurrency with US 258
Northampton	Conway	11.6	18.7	US 158 (Main Street) – Jackson, Murfreesboro	
Southampton		20.5	33.0	SR 35 north (Meherrin Road) – Boykins	Virginia state line
1.000 mi = 1.609 km; 1.000 km = 0.621 mi: Concurrency terminus

== See also ==
- North Carolina Bicycle Route 4 – concurrent with NC 35 through Severn
