= North Carolina Highway 305 =

State highway in North Carolina, US

North Carolina Highway 305

Route information
- Maintained by NCDOT
- Length: 44.7 mi (71.9 km)
- Existed: 1921–present

Major junctions
- South end: US 13 near Windsor
- NC 11 / NC 42 near Aulander; US 258 / NC 561 in Rich Square; US 158 in Jackson
- North end: NC 186 in Seaboard

Location
- Country: United States
- State: North Carolina
- Counties: Bertie, Hertford, Northampton

Highway system
- North Carolina Highway System; Interstate; US; State; Scenic
← NC 304	→ NC 306

North Carolina Highway 305 (NC 305) is a primary state highway in the U.S. state of North Carolina. NC 305 runs from US 13 north of Windsor to NC 186 in Seaboard. NC 305 is an original state highway and appeared on the 1936 official map of North Carolina from Seaboard to Aulander. NC 305 has an average of 1663 cars per day on the highway.

== Route description ==
NC 305 begins at an intersection with US 13 north of Windsor, then heads northwesterly toward Burden and Connarlsta. The highway then crosses NC 11/NC 42 near Aulander and continues through downtown Aulander where it crosses the former route's business route. NC 305 then runs into southwestern Hertford County before it meets NC 561 near Northampton County. NC 305 and NC 561 run concurrently until Rich Square where it crosses US 258. Beyond US 258, NC 305 heads northwesterly toward Jackson and runs concurrently with US 158 westward into Jackson before it turns north towards Seaboard. After seven miles (11 km), NC 305 reaches its northern terminus at NC 186 in Seaboard.

== History ==
By 1930, NC 305 was extended north to its current terminus in Seaboard. By 1940, NC 305 was extended south to NC 97 north of Windsor. When US 13 was extended south, NC 97 was renumbered as part of US 13. When NC 561 was extended, NC 305 was built to run concurrently with NC 561 for six miles (9.7 km). NC 305 has had the same routing since then.

== Junction list ==
County	Location	mi	km	Destinations	Notes
Bertie		0.0	0.0	US 13 – Windsor, Ahoskie	
Bertie		12.4	20.0	NC 11 / NC 42 – Lewiston-Woodville, Ahoskie	
Bertie	Aulander	13.3	21.4	NC 11 Bus. (Main Street)	
Hertford	Mintons Store	19.0	30.6	NC 561 east – Ahoskie	East end of NC 561 overlap
Hertford	Mintons Store	19.7	31.7	NC 35 north – Woodland	Southern terminus of NC 35
Northampton	Rich Square	25.2	40.6	NC 561 west (Short Street) – Scotland Neck	West end of NC 561 overlap
Northampton	Rich Square	25.3	40.7	US 258 (Main Street) – Murfreesboro, Scotland Neck	
Northampton	Jackson	36.5	58.7	US 158 east – Conway, Murfreesboro	East end of US 158 overlap
Northampton	Jackson	37.3	60.0	US 158 west (Jefferson Street) – Weldon, Roanoke Rapids	West end of US 158 overlap
Northampton	Seaboard	44.7	71.9	NC 186 (Central Street) – Margarettsville, Weldon	
1.000 mi = 1.609 km; 1.000 km = 0.621 mi: Concurrency terminus
