= North Carolina Highway 11 =

State highway in North Carolina, US

North Carolina Highway 11

- Route of NC 11 highlighted in red

Route information
- Maintained by NCDOT
- Length: 193.2 mi (310.9 km)
- Existed: 1921–present

Major junctions
- South end: US 74 / US 76 in Freeman
- US 421 in Wards Corner; US 117 near Willard; I-40 near Wallace; US 70 / US 258 in Kinston; US 13 / US 264 in Greenville; US 64 near Conetoe
- North end: US 258 / US 158 Bus.in Murfreesboro

Location
- Country: United States
- State: North Carolina
- Counties: Columbus, Bladen, Pender, Duplin, Lenoir, Pitt, Edgecombe, Martin, Bertie, Hertford

Highway system
- North Carolina Highway System; Interstate; US; State; Scenic
← NC 10	→ NC 12

North Carolina Highway 11 (NC 11) is a primary state highway in the U.S. state of North Carolina. Traveling 193.2 miles (310.9 km) in a north–south alignment through Eastern North Carolina, it connects the towns and cities of Wallace, Kenansville, Kinston, Greenville and Murfreesboro.

== Route description ==
NC 11 begins at US 74/US 76 in the unincorporated community of Freeman. It travels north to NC 87 at Sandyfield before exiting Columbus County. Soon entering Bladen County, it crosses the Cape Fear River, then travels nearly seven miles (11 km) to Long View, where it joins with NC 53 before crossing the Black River and into Pender County. Traveling in a northeasterly direction, NC 11/NC 53 turns east at Atkinson; at Wards Corner it changes its concurrency from NC 53, which continues to Burgaw, to US 421 towards Clinton. After over seven miles (11 km), NC 11 splits from US 421 and continues northeast through Penderlea and Willard, where it then joins US 117 near exit 390 off Interstate 40 (I-40). Traveling northeast, it crosses over Rock Fish Creek into Duplin County.

NC 11 splits towards the Tin City area of Wallace, while US 117 continues towards the downtown area. Northeast of Wallace, NC 11 connects with I-40 (exit 385) and continues through Murphey, Greenevers and Register before reaching the NC 24/NC 903 Kenansville Bypass, which acts as a bypass for through traffic along NC 11. Continuing through Kenansville, it joins briefly with NC 50; north of town, it joins with NC 903 and continues northeast to Kornegay, where it switches concurrency with NC 111 for 0.3 miles (0.48 km) before continuing east into Lenoir County. At Pink Hill, NC 11 continues northeasterly and widens to a four-lane divided expressway as it travels through Deep Run and Albrittons and Jacksons Crossroads, where it is joined by NC 55. At an area known as Skinner's By-Pass, NC 11/NC 55 enter Kinston's city limits and connects with US 70/US 258. Crossing east over the Neuse River and into downtown Kinston, NC 11/NC 55 connect with US 70 Bus./US 258 Bus. along Queen Street. At a roundabout, NC 11/NC 55 returns to a northeasterly direction and through the Harverytown area of Kinston. Upon leaving the city limits of Kinston, NC 55 diverges from NC 11, and continues into New Bern. Parallel to the CSX rail line since Graingers, NC 11 continues alongside the four-lane expressway, coming to the parclo interchange with NC 148 (CF Harvey Parkway), before coming to the at-grade intersection with NC 118, which connects to nearby Grifton, before crossing the Contentnea Creek and into Pitt County.NC 11 traverses west of the center of Greenville via its bypass route with the rural controlled access grade, while the mainline route goes west of the downtown centers of Ayden and Winterville with the expressway, before becoming the arterial route inside downtown and central Greenville. NC 11 (Bypass), comes to the cloverleaf interchange with Interstate 587 and US 264, and continues north of central Greenville. The stretch of NC 11 inside central Greenville, comes to the intersection with US 13, where the two runs concurrent. NC 11 (Bypass and Mainline), joins north of Downtown Greenville. NC 11 continues alongside US 13, along the rural expressway of overall four lanes, before coming to Bethel with another bypass stretch which is mostly freeway standards and is overall four lanes, while the inner arterial route is designated "Business." Inside the town, both stretches of NC 11 comes to US 64 Alt, before the two stretches of NC 11 unite, and downgrades to two lanes when coming to the diamond interchange with the freeway stretch of US 64. NC 11 continues north into various rural communities, before entering into Ahoskie, where NC 11 and US 13 diverges from their concurrency. NC 11 comes to its Murfreesboro, where it intersects with US 258 and US 158 Business, forming the northern end of NC 11.

NC 11 between Kinston to the south, and Bethel to the north, is of expressway and freeway standards. Most of the less-denser stretches are cosigned with more major U.S. Highways, including one stretch of US 421 near the southern terminus and US 13 north of Greenville. Being the through route for surrounding drivers, US 258 or US 13 travel along the same general directions, but appear to be better maintained and closer to major population centers.

== History ==
NC 11 was established in 1921 as an original state highway, traveling northeasterly from NC 40, in Kenansville, to NC 10, in Kinston; then continuing north, through Greenville, to NC 90, in Bethel. Around 1930, NC 11 was extended north on new primary routing to NC 125, in Oak City, via Hassell. In 1940, NC 11 was extended south from Kenansville to Tin City, replacing part of US 117; then with a short concurrency with US 117, it travels 1 mile (1.6 km) to the North Carolina Coastal Experimental Station (agriculture testing facility), replacing NC 401. In 1942, NC 11 was rerouted to a more direct route between Bethel and Oak City; its old alignment through Hassell was downgraded to secondary roads (today NC 42 and Hassell Road).

By 1942, the first rerouting of NC 11 through Kinston took place; the original alignment was crossing over the Neuse River via Caswell Street, north on Queen Street, east on Vernon Avenue and northeast on Minerva Street. The realignment begins in Jacksons Store with concurrency with NC 55 going east along Tyree Road to US 258, from there continuing north into Kinston along Queen Street; the old alignment along Caswell Street is downgraded to secondary road. By 1948, NC 11/NC 55 was rerouted east onto King Street, north on East Street, east on Washington Avenue and then northeast on Minerva Street; the old alignment through central Kinston became NC 11A. In 1952, NC 11/NC 55 was rerouted onto its current routing from Jacksons Store north into Kinston, crossing the Neuse River on King Street; Tyree Road (SR 1341) was downgraded to secondary road while US 258 remained.

By 1958, NC 11 was rerouted to its current alignment in Greenville along Memorial Drive; its old alignment along Dickinson Avenue to Greene Street was downgraded to secondary roads. By 1963, the spur to the North Carolina Coastal Experimental Station was downgraded to secondary road and NC 11 was truncated at US 117 near Wallace. In 1966, NC 11 was extended north on new primary routing, across the Roanoke River, to NC 308, in Lewiston. In 1967, its northern terminus was extended again to NC 305, in Connaritsa. In 1969, NC 11/NC 55 was rerouted to its current alignment along Tiffany Street (today Dr. Martin Luther King Jr. Boulevard), with its old alignment along East Street and Washington Avenue downgraded to secondary roads. Near Grifton, NC 11 was placed on new western bypass, leaving behind Highland Boulevard/Avenue.

=== North Carolina Highway 401 ===
North Carolina Highway 401
- Location: Coastal Plains Experiment Station
- Length: .8 mi (1,300 m)
- Existed: 1930–1940

North Carolina Highway 401 (NC 401) was established as a new primary spur of NC 40 to the North Carolina Coastal Plains Experiment Station (agriculture testing facility), south of Wallace. In 1940, NC 401 was replaced by an extension of NC 11, which was eventually downgraded to secondary road by 1963 (today Jonestown Road).

== Major intersections ==
County	Location	mi	km	Destinations	Notes
Columbus	Freeman	0.0	0.0	US 74 / US 76 (Andrew Jackson Highway) – Whiteville, Wilmington	
Columbus	Sandyfield	4.2	6.8	NC 87 (Old Stage Highway) – Southport, Elizabethtown	
Bladen		10.3	16.6	NC 210 – Hampstead, Fayetteville	
Bladen	Long View	12.4	20.0	NC 53 west – White Lake	West end of NC 53 overlap
Pender	Wards Corner	22.6	36.4	US 421 south / NC 53 east – Wilmington, Burgaw	South end of US 421 and east end of NC 53 overlap
Pender		30.3	48.8	US 421 north – Clinton	North end of US 421 overlap
Pender		40.6	65.3	US 117 south to I-40 – Wilmington	South end of US 117 overlap
Duplin	Wallace	43.1	69.4	US 117 north (Norwood Street)	North end of US 117 overlap
Duplin	Wallace	44.7	71.9	NC 41 (Southerland Street) – Beulaville	
Duplin	Wallace	46.9	75.5	I-40 – Wilmington, Benson	I-40 exit 384
Duplin	Kenansville	59.2	95.3	NC 24 / NC 903 (Kenansville Bypass) – Magnolia, Beulaville	
Duplin	Kenansville	61.0	98.2	NC 24 Bus. west / NC 50 north (Mallard Street) – Warsaw, Clinton	West end of NC 24 Bus. and north end of NC 50 overlap
Duplin	Kenansville	61.6	99.1	NC 50 south (Limestone Road) – Chinquapin	South end of NC 50 overlap
Duplin	Kenansville	61.7	99.3	NC 24 Bus. east (Routledge Road) – Jacksonville	North end of NC 24 Bus. overlap
Duplin	Kenansville	63.5	102.2	NC 903 south (Kenansville Bypass) – Magnolia, Beulaville	South end of NC 903 overlap
Duplin	Kornegay	72.6	116.8	NC 111 north / NC 903 north – Goldsboro	North end of NC 111 and NC 903 overlap
Duplin	Kornegay	73.0	117.5	NC 111 south – Beulaville	North end of NC 111 overlap
Lenoir	Pink Hill	77.3	124.4	NC 241 south (Front Street) – Beulaville	Northern terminus of NC 241
Lenoir	Jacksons Store	90.4	145.5	NC 55 west – Mount Olive	West end of NC 55 overlap
Lenoir	Kinston	93.7	150.8	US 70 / US 258 (New Bern Road) – New Bern, Goldsboro	
Lenoir	Kinston	94.9	152.7	US 70 Bus. / US 258 Bus. / NC 58 (Queen Street) – Jacksonville, Snow Hill	
Lenoir		98.8	159.0	NC 55 east – New Bern	East end of NC 55 overlap
Lenoir		102.2	164.5	NC 148 south (C.F. Harvey Parkway)	Parclo interchange
Lenoir	Grifton	106.0	170.6	NC 118 east (Grifton-Hugo Road) – Grifton	Western terminus of NC 118
Pitt	Ayden	112.5	181.1	NC 11 Byp. north to US 264 – Greenville	Interchange; northbound exit, southbound entrance only; NC 11 northbound signed as Exit 112 from NC 11 Bypass
Pitt	Ayden	113.6	182.8	NC 102 (3rd Street) – Ayden, Maury	
Pitt	Winterville	117.6	189.3	NC 903 south – Snow Hill	South end of NC 903 overlap
Pitt	Greenville	120.7	194.2	US 264 Alt. / NC 43 south (Greenville Boulevard) – Washington, Wilson	South end of NC 43 overlap
Pitt	Greenville	122.7	197.5	US 13 south (Dickinson Avenue) – Farmville	South end of US 13 overlap
Pitt	Greenville	123.7	199.1	NC 43 north (5th Street) – Rocky Mount	North end of NC 43 overlap
Pitt	Greenville	126.5	203.6	NC 33 east (Greene Street) – Grimesland	East end of NC 33 overlap
Pitt	Greenville	126.9	204.2	NC 33 west (Belvoir Highway) – Tarboro	West end of NC 33 overlap
Pitt	Greenville	127.3	204.9	US 264 / NC 11 Byp. south (Martin Luther King Jr. Highway) – Washington, Wilson	US 264 exit 80
Pitt	Greenville	128.0	206.0	NC 903 north – Robersonville, Hamilton	North end of NC 903 overlap
Pitt		136.3	219.4	NC 30 east – Washington	Western terminus of NC 30
Pitt		136.6	219.8	US 13 Bus. / NC 11 Bus. (Main Street) – Bethel	
Pitt	Bethel	137.9	221.9	US 64 Alt. (Washington Street) – Parmele, Bethel	
Edgecombe		139.6	224.7	US 13 Bus. / NC 11 Bus. – Bethel	
Edgecombe		139.8	225.0	US 13 north / US 64 – Williamston, Tarboro	North end of US 13 overlap; U 64 exit 496
Martin	Hassell	146.0	235.0	NC 42 west / NC 142 – Hassell, Wilson	West end of NC 42 overlap
Martin	Oak City	150.1	241.6	NC 111 south – Tarboro	Northern terminus of NC 111
Martin	Oak City	150.7	242.5	NC 125 (Cherry Street) – Hamilton, Hobgood	
Martin		154.6	248.8	NC 903 north – Scotland Neck	South end of NC 903 overlap
Martin				NC 903 south – Hamilton	North end of NC 903 overlap
Bertie	Lewiston	165.0	265.5	NC 308 (Church Street) – Windsor, Kelford	To Hope Plantation
Bertie		169.8	273.3	NC 11 Bus. – Aulander	
Bertie	Aulander	172.6	277.8	NC 305 (Commerce Street) – Windsor, Aulander	
Hertford		175.4	282.3	NC 11 Bus. (Millennium Road) – Aulander	
Hertford	Poor Town	178.0	286.5	NC 42 east – Ahoskie	North end of NC 42 overlap
Hertford		180.6	290.6	NC 561 – Ahoskie, Rich Square	
Hertford		184.2	296.4	NC 461 – Winton, Rich Square	To Roanoke Chowan Community College
Hertford	Murfreesboro	191.7	308.5	US 158 / US 258 south (Walter Reid Memorial Highway) – Winton, Conway	South end of US 258 overlap
Hertford	Murfreesboro	193.2	310.9	US 158 Bus. (Main Street) / US 258 north (Virginia Boulevard) – Elizabeth City, Franklin	North end of US 258 overlap
1.000 mi = 1.609 km; 1.000 km = 0.621 mi: Concurrency terminus; Incomplete access

== Special routes ==
=== Kenansville alternate spur ===
North Carolina Highway 11A
- Location: Kenansville, North Carolina
- Length: 0.18 mi (290 m)
- Existed: 1940–1960

North Carolina Highway 11 Alternate (NC 11A) was a renumbering of part of US 117. It existed as a cutoff between NC 11 and NC 24. It was decommissioned by 1960, downgraded to Tyndall Street (SR 1383).

=== Kinston alternate route ===
North Carolina Highway 11A
- Location: Kinston, North Carolina
- Existed: 1949–1960

North Carolina Highway 11 Alternate (NC 11A) was a renumbering of NC 11 through downtown Kinston, via Queen Street and Vernon Avenue. In 1960, it was renumbered to NC 11 Business.

=== Kinston business loop ===
North Carolina Highway 11 Business
- Location: Kinston, North Carolina
- Existed: 1960–1969

North Carolina Highway 11 Business (NC 11 Bus) was a renumbering of NC 11A through downtown Kinston, via Queen Street and Vernon Avenue. In 1969, the route was downgraded to secondary roads.

=== Greenville bypass ===
North Carolina Highway 11 Bypass
- Location: Greenville, North Carolina
- Length: 17.9 mi (28.8 km)
- Existed: 2019–present

North Carolina Highway 11 Bypass (NC 11 Byp.), was established in 2019 as a bypass route of NC 11. The bypass is a 17.9-mile (28.8 km), four-lane freeway. Unlike the previous bypass projects where NC 11 would be rerouted onto a newly constructed bypass with the stretches in or close to the core of the municipalities, being designated in business routes, NC 11 actually goes avoids the cores of Ayden and Winterville, and traverses inside the center of Greenville, with the bypass route avoiding the downtowns of the municipalities in its entirety. The northern 5.3 stretch with the junction with I-587 and northward overlaps solely with US 264 and was originally constructed for said route to also bypass central Greenville. The southern 12.6 miles (20.3 km) stretch of the route is the Greenville Southwest Bypass, which was completed the same year the route was established.

=== Bethel business loop ===
North Carolina Highway 11 Business
- Location: Bethel, North Carolina
- Length: 3.0 mi (4.8 km)
- Existed: 2003–present

North Carolina Highway 11 Business (NC 11 Bus) was established in 2003 as a renumbering of mainline NC 11 through downtown Bethel, via Main Street. It shares a complete concurrency with US 13 Bus.

County	Location	mi	km	Destinations	Notes
Pitt		0.0	0.0	US 13 / US 13 Bus. begins / NC 11 – Greenville, Williamston	South end of US 13 Business overlap
Pitt	Bethel	1.2	1.9	US 64 Alt. (Washington Street) – Parmele, Williamston, Tarboro	
Edgecombe		3.0	4.8	US 13 / US 13 Bus. ends / NC 11 – Greenville, Williamston	North end of US 13 Business overlap
1.000 mi = 1.609 km; 1.000 km = 0.621 mi: Concurrency terminus

=== Aulander business loop ===
North Carolina Highway 11 Business
- Location: Aulander, North Carolina
- Length: 6.3 mi (10.1 km)
- Existed: 1978–present

North Carolina Highway 11 Business (NC 11 Bus) was established in 1978 as a renumbering of mainline NC 11 through downtown Aulander, via Main Street.

County	Location	mi	km	Destinations	Notes
Bertie		0.0	0.0	NC 11 / NC 42 – Lewiston-Woodville, Ahoskie	
Bertie	Aulander	3.8	6.1	NC 305 (Commerce Street) – Windsor, Rich Square	
Hertford		6.3	10.1	NC 11 / NC 42 – Lewiston-Woodville, Ahoskie	
1.000 mi = 1.609 km; 1.000 km = 0.621 mi

== See also ==
- North Carolina Bicycle Route 5 – NC 11 concurrent in Long View
