= Graingers, North Carolina =

- Census-designated place
- Location within North Carolina Location within the United States
- Coordinates: 35°18′59″N 77°30′24″W
- Country: United States
- State: North Carolina
- County: Lenoir

Area
  - Total: 1.65 sq mi (4.28 km^{2})
  - Land: 1.65 sq mi (4.28 km^{2})
  - Water: 0 sq mi (0.00 km^{2})
- Elevation: 69 ft (21 m)

Population (2020)
  - Total: 229
  - Density: 138.5/sq mi (53.49/km^{2})
- Time zone: UTC-5 (Eastern (EST))
  - Summer (DST): UTC-4 (EDT)
- ZIP Code: 28501 (Kinston); 28530 (Grifton)
- Area code: 252
- FIPS code: 37-27300
- GNIS feature ID: 2812794

Graingers is an unincorporated community and census-designated place (CDP) in Lenoir County, North Carolina, United States. It was first listed as a CDP in the 2020 census with a population of 229.

The community is in northeastern Lenoir County, along North Carolina Highway 11. It is 6 miles (10 km) northeast of Kinston, the county seat, and the same distance southwest of Grifton. North Carolina Highway 148, the C.F. Harvey Parkway, has its eastern terminus at NC-11 in the northeastern end of Graingers. The parkway serves as a northern and western bypass of Kinston, reaching U.S. Route 70 in 13 miles (21 km).

== Demographics ==
Historical population
Census	Pop.	Note	%±
2020	229		—
U.S. Decennial Census; 2020

=== 2020 census ===
Graingers CDP, North Carolina – Demographic Profile (NH = Non-Hispanic)
Race / Ethnicity	Pop 2020	% 2020
White alone (NH)	128	55.90%
Black or African American alone (NH)	78	34.06%
Native American or Alaska Native alone (NH)	0	0.00%
Asian alone (NH)	0	0.00%
Pacific Islander alone (NH)	1	0.44%
Some Other Race alone (NH)	2	0.87%
Mixed Race/Multi-Racial (NH)	5	2.18%
Hispanic or Latino (any race)	15	6.55%
Total	229	100.00%

Note: the US Census treats Hispanic/Latino as an ethnic category. This table excludes Latinos from the racial categories and assigns them to a separate category. Hispanics/Latinos can be of any race.
