= Cedar Dell =

Historic house in North Carolina, United States

- U.S. National Register of Historic Places
- U.S. Historic district – Contributing property
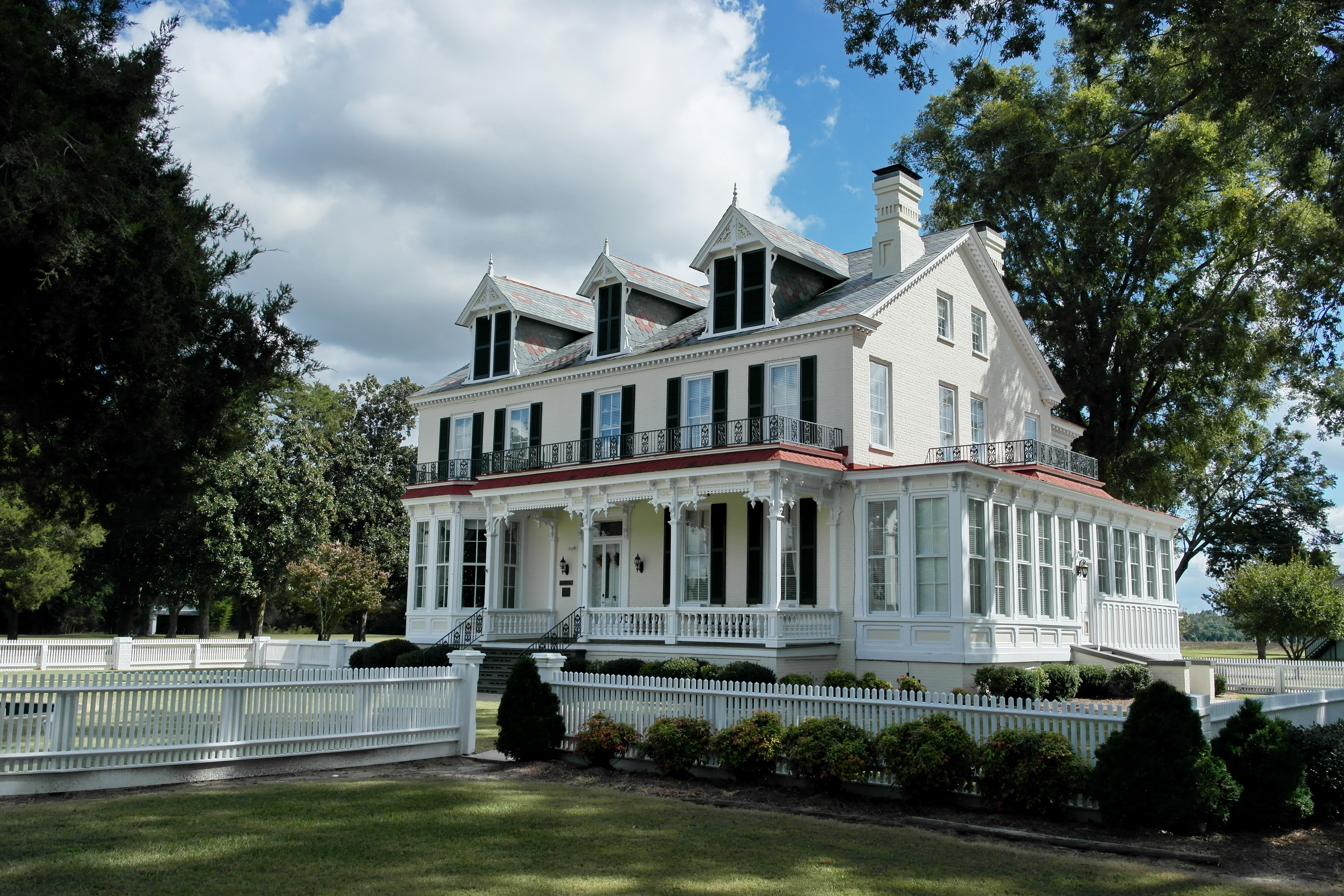
- Cedar Dell, September 2013

- Location within North Carolina Location within the United States
- Location: Southeast of Falling Creek on SR 1338, near Falling Creek, North Carolina
- Coordinates: 35°15′17″N 77°41′20″W
- Area: 7 acres (2.8 ha)
- Built: c. 1820
- Architectural style: Gothic, Federal, New Bern side-hall plan
- NRHP reference No.: 71000600
- Added to NRHP: August 26, 1971

Cedar Dell, also known as Kennedy Memorial Home, is a historic plantation house located near Falling Creek, Lenoir County, North Carolina. It was originally constructed about 1820 as a two-story, three-bay, Federal style brick dwelling with a side-hall plan. It was enlarged to five bays wide and converted to a Victorian Gothic central hall plan mansion. The front facade features a one-story Eastlake-style porch with a low roof topped by a wrought iron balustrade and the rear facade has a two-tier porch. Also on the front facade is a large bay window with a roof identical to that on the porch. The house and property were deeded for use as an orphanage in 1912.

It was listed on the National Register of Historic Places in 1971. It is located in the Kennedy Memorial Home Historic District.
