= Kennedy Memorial Home Historic District =

Historic district in North Carolina, United States

- U.S. National Register of Historic Places
- U.S. Historic district
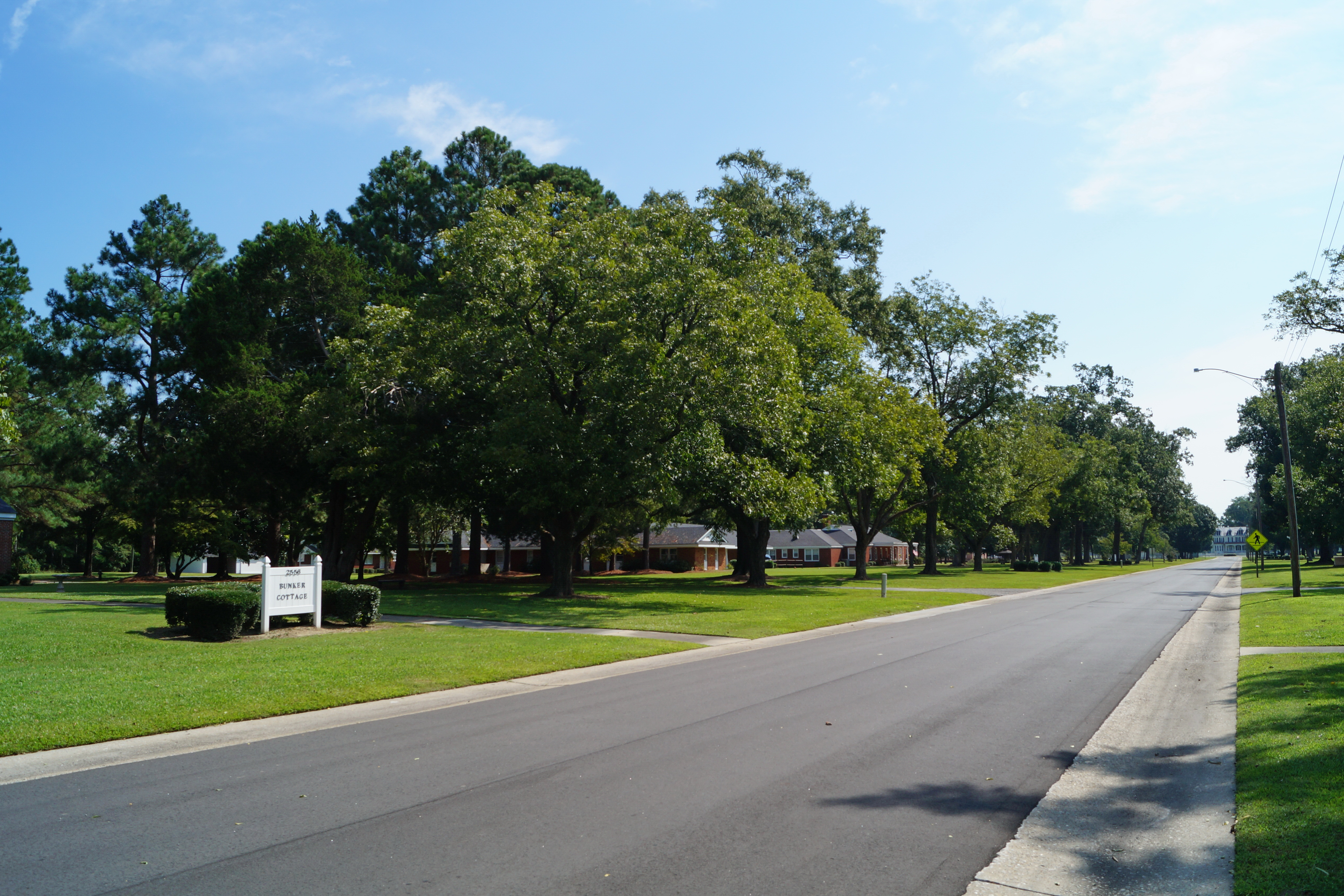
- Kennedy Memorial Home Historic District, September 2014

- Location within North Carolina Location within the United States
- Location: 2557 Ceder Dell Lane, near Kinston, North Carolina
- Coordinates: 35°15′17″N 77°41′33″W
- Area: 1,240 acres (500 ha)
- Architect: Adams, Jack
- Architectural style: Federal, Stick/eastlake, Bungalow/Craftsman
- NRHP reference No.: 09000684
- Added to NRHP: September 3, 2009

Kennedy Memorial Home Historic District, also known as Cedar Dell, is a historic farm and national historic district located near Kinston, Lenoir County, North Carolina. It encompasses 29 contributing buildings, 7 contributing sites and 5 contributing structures. The district includes an orphanage owned by the Baptist Children's Homes of North Carolina and constructed from 1914 to 1959. Located in the district is the separately listed Federal style Cedar Dell plantation home. Other contributing resources are the Jar Room/Shop (1920s), potato curing barn (1920s), Pollock Cottage (1936), Kennedy Memorial Home Baptist Church (1956), Jones Swimming Pool (1957), Cedar Dell Cemetery (1830s-1929), and Brogden Food Locker (1950s).

It was listed on the National Register of Historic Places in 2009.
