= North Carolina Highway 118 =

State highway in North Carolina, US

North Carolina Highway 118

Route information
- Maintained by NCDOT
- Length: 18.5 mi (29.8 km)
- Existed: 1932–present

Major junctions
- West end: NC 11 near Grifton
- East end: NC 43 in Vanceboro

Location
- Country: United States
- State: North Carolina
- Counties: Lenoir, Pitt, Craven

Highway system
- North Carolina Highway System; Interstate; US; State; Scenic
← US 117	→ NC 119

North Carolina Highway 118 (NC 118) is an 18.5-mile-long (29.8 km) primary state highway in the U.S. state of North Carolina. It runs east–west from NC 11 in Grifton to NC 43 in Vanceboro.

== Route description ==
A two-lane rural highway, it traverses 18.5 miles (29.8 km) through mostly farmland, as it connects the towns of Grifton and Vanceboro. The highway begins at a stop-controlled intersection with the divided NC 11 just outside of the town limits of Grifton in Lenoir County. NC 118 heads east along West Contentnea Drive through farmland for 1/4 mile (0.40 km) then enters Grifton and passes through small residential neighborhood for another 1/4 mile (0.40 km). At an intersection with South Highland Boulevard, NC 118 turns to the northeast along this road and crosses the Contentnea Creek into Pitt County and downtown Grifton. It makes a turn towards the southeast at Queen Street where NC 118 heads through the town's central business district. After curving slowly to due east, the road heads through another residential neighborhood of Grifton before exiting the town for a more rural area. One small settlement in Pitt County through which NC 118 passes is Quinerly where some houses and streets line the south side of the road.

NC 118 heads towards the southeast again where it enters Craven County, again in a mostly rural area. It curves to the east where it passes through an unnamed settlement (at the intersection of Honolulu Road and Bay Bush Road) containing some churches, cemeteries, and a farm and garden store. The road makes one more drop towards the southeast passing another unnamed settlement with houses and churches before curving one last time to the east at wooded marshland containing Swift Creek. NC 118 ends at an intersection with NC 43 within a small annexed portion of Vanceboro. The road continues east as state-maintained Dawson Lane (Secondary Road 1654) to end about 1/2 mile (0.80 km) later at U.S. Route 17 Business.

== History ==
Established in 1932 as a new primary routing, it initially ran from U.S. Route 70 (US 70)/NC 10 (now NC 55) in Fort Barnwell to NC 43 in Vanceboro. Around 1940, it was rerouted to a new western terminus at NC 11 in Grifton. In 1969, it was extended west over an old section of NC 11 and Grifton Hugo Road to its current western terminus of NC 11.

== Junction list ==
County	Location	mi	km	Destinations	Notes
Lenoir	Grifton	0.0	0.0	NC 11 / Grifton Hugo Road – Kinston, Greenville	Western terminus
Pitt	No major junctions				
Craven	Vanceboro	18.5	29.8	NC 43 / Dawson Lane – Vanceboro, Greenville	Eastern terminus
1.000 mi = 1.609 km; 1.000 km = 0.621 mi
