= Jackson Heights, North Carolina =

- Census-designated place
- Location within North Carolina Location within the United States
- Coordinates: 35°13′25″N 77°38′00″W
- Country: United States
- State: North Carolina
- County: Lenoir

Area
  - Total: 1.45 sq mi (3.76 km^{2})
  - Land: 1.45 sq mi (3.76 km^{2})
  - Water: 0 sq mi (0.00 km^{2})
- Elevation: 79 ft (24 m)

Population (2020)
  - Total: 1,071
  - Density: 737.1/sq mi (284.59/km^{2})
- Time zone: UTC-5 (Eastern (EST))
  - Summer (DST): UTC-4 (EDT)
- ZIP code: 28504
- Area code: 252
- GNIS feature ID: 2628639

Jackson Heights is an unincorporated community and census-designated place (CDP) in Lenoir County, North Carolina, United States. As of the 2020 census, Jackson Heights had a population of 1,071.

== Geography ==
Jackson Heights is in central Lenoir County, 4 miles (6 km) southwest of Kinston, the county seat. North Carolina Highway 11 and North Carolina Highway 55 form the northwestern border of the community. The highways run northeastward together into Kinston, while NC 11 leads southwest 28 miles (45 km) to Kenansville and NH 55 leads west 26 miles (42 km) to Mount Olive. U.S. Route 258 passes just southeast of Jackson Heights, leading northeast into Kinston and south 39 miles (63 km) to Jacksonville.

According to the U.S. Census Bureau, the CDP has an area of 1.45 square miles (3.8 km^{2}), all land.

== Demographics ==
Historical population
Census	Pop.	Note	%±
2020	1,071		—
U.S. Decennial Census
