= North Carolina Highway 241 =

State highway in North Carolina, US

North Carolina Highway 241
- NC 241 highlighted in red

Route information
- Maintained by NCDOT
- Length: 9.1 mi (14.6 km)
- Existed: 1971–present

Major junctions
- South end: NC 41 / NC 111 in Beulaville
- North end: NC 11 in Pink Hill

Location
- Country: United States
- State: North Carolina
- Counties: Duplin, Lenoir

Highway system
- North Carolina Highway System; Interstate; US; State; Scenic
← I-240	→ NC 242

North Carolina Highway 241 (NC 241) is a primary state highway in the U.S. state of North Carolina. NC 241 travels for 9.1 miles (14.6 km) from NC 41 and NC 111 in Beulaville to NC 11 in Pink Hill. Outside of Beulaville and Pink Hill, NC 241 is a rather straight, predominantly rural route. The highway travels through Duplin County for 7.6 miles (12.2 km) while traveling 1.5 miles (2.4 km) in Lenoir County.

NC 241 was established on November 4, 1971, replacing existing secondary roads between Beulaville and Pink Hill. The route has remained unchanged since its establishment.

== Route description ==
NC 241 begins at NC 41 and NC 111 north of downtown Beulaville. NC 41 and NC 111 continue south along Jackson Street toward an intersection with NC 24. From its southern terminus, NC 241 travels north through a semi-rural area north of Beulaville, with some mixed commercial, residential, and farmland. The highway crosses Limestone Creek 1 mile (1.6 km) north of its southern terminus. North of the creek, the surrounding area is primarily rural with mixed farmland and some residential buildings along the highway. As NC 241 approaches Sumner Road, it enters a residential community centered around the Sumner Road intersection. Travelling north of the intersection, residential buildings become more sparse. NC 241 continues through rural Duplin County for 4 miles (6.4 km) before entering Lenoir County and entering Pink Hill 0.8 miles (1.3 km) north of the county line. Crossing into the town limits, the road name changes to Front Street, and NC 241 makes a slight curve to the north. The highway primarily runs through a residential area of Pink Hill until intersecting Broadway Street where a business district is located. The highway continues north for 0.1 miles (0.16 km) along Front Street until reaching its northern terminus at NC 11 (Kinston Highway).

The North Carolina Department of Transportation (NCDOT) measures average daily traffic volumes along many of the roadways it maintains. In 2016, average daily traffic volumes along NC 241 varied between 3,800, south of Country Club Road in Duplin County, to 4,800 near NC 11 in Pink Hill.

== History ==
=== Previous designations ===
North Carolina Highway 241
- Location: Johns–Aberdeen, NC
- Length: 38 mi (61 km)
- Existed: 1930–1935

NC 241 was established in 1930 as a new primary routing, from the community of Johns to NC 70 in Aberdeen. From its southern terminus, NC 241 ran northeast for along a paved road for 5 miles (8.0 km), intersecting NC 24 southwest of Laurinburg. NC 241 ran concurrently with NC 24 for 2 miles (3.2 km) through Laurinburg, before diverting along its own roadway to the north. NC 241 followed a gravel, topsoil, or sand-clay road for 26 miles (42 km) before reaching NC 70 in Aberdeen. In 1931, NC 241 was extended to NC 71 in Seven Bridges, largely in a "u-shaped" direction. The 5 miles (8.0 km) extension was along a gravel, topsoil, or sand-clay road and extended NC 241 into Robeson County. By 1931, roadwork had begun along NC 241 from an area north of Laurinburg to the Hoke County–Moore County line. Roadwork was completed by 1933 and NC 241 was straightened out between Laurinburg and Aberdeen. The construction eliminated 1 mile (1.6 km) of the NC 24 concurrency north of Laurinburg. U.S. Route 311 (US 311) was assigned to the entire routing of NC 241, while US 401 was assigned along the NC 24 concurrency the same year. By 1935, US 501 replaced US 311 along the route. As a result, NC 241 was completely decommissioned.

=== Current designation ===
Upon the establishment of the North Carolina State Highway system, NC 11 was routed to follow Front Street between Broadway Street and the Kinston Highway in Pink Hill. A secondary road running along modern-day NC 241 existed since at least 1930 when it first appeared on county maps. The secondary roads ran similar along a similar routing to modern-day NC 241 except for a small segment in Pink Hill. In Pink Hill the road ran along modern-day Old Beulaville Road to College Street. In 1930, the section in Duplin County was considered a graded road, while the section between the Lenoir County line and College Street was a gravel, sand-clay, or topsoil road. The segment of NC 11 running along Front Street was paved. By 1944, the entire route was considered to be a soil surfaced road. The road was readjusted to its current route in Pink Hill and paved in Lenoir County by 1949. The Duplin County segment was paved by 1953. Additionally, NC 11 was rerouted onto its current routing north of Pink Hill. The former route of NC 11 along Front Street became a secondary road until the establishment of NC 241. NC 241 was established on November 4, 1971, as an upgrading of secondary roads SR 1005 in Duplin County and SR 1106 in Lenoir County between NC 111 in Beualville and NC 11 in Pink Hill. The route has remained unchanged since its establishment.

== Junction list ==
County	Location	mi	km	Destinations	Notes
Duplin	Beulaville	0.0	0.0	NC 41 / NC 111 – Trenton, Goldsboro	Southern terminus
Lenoir	Pink Hill	9.1	14.6	NC 11 (Kinston Highway) – Kinston, Kenansville	Northern terminus
1.000 mi = 1.609 km; 1.000 km = 0.621 mi
