= Chris Humphrey (politician) =

American politician

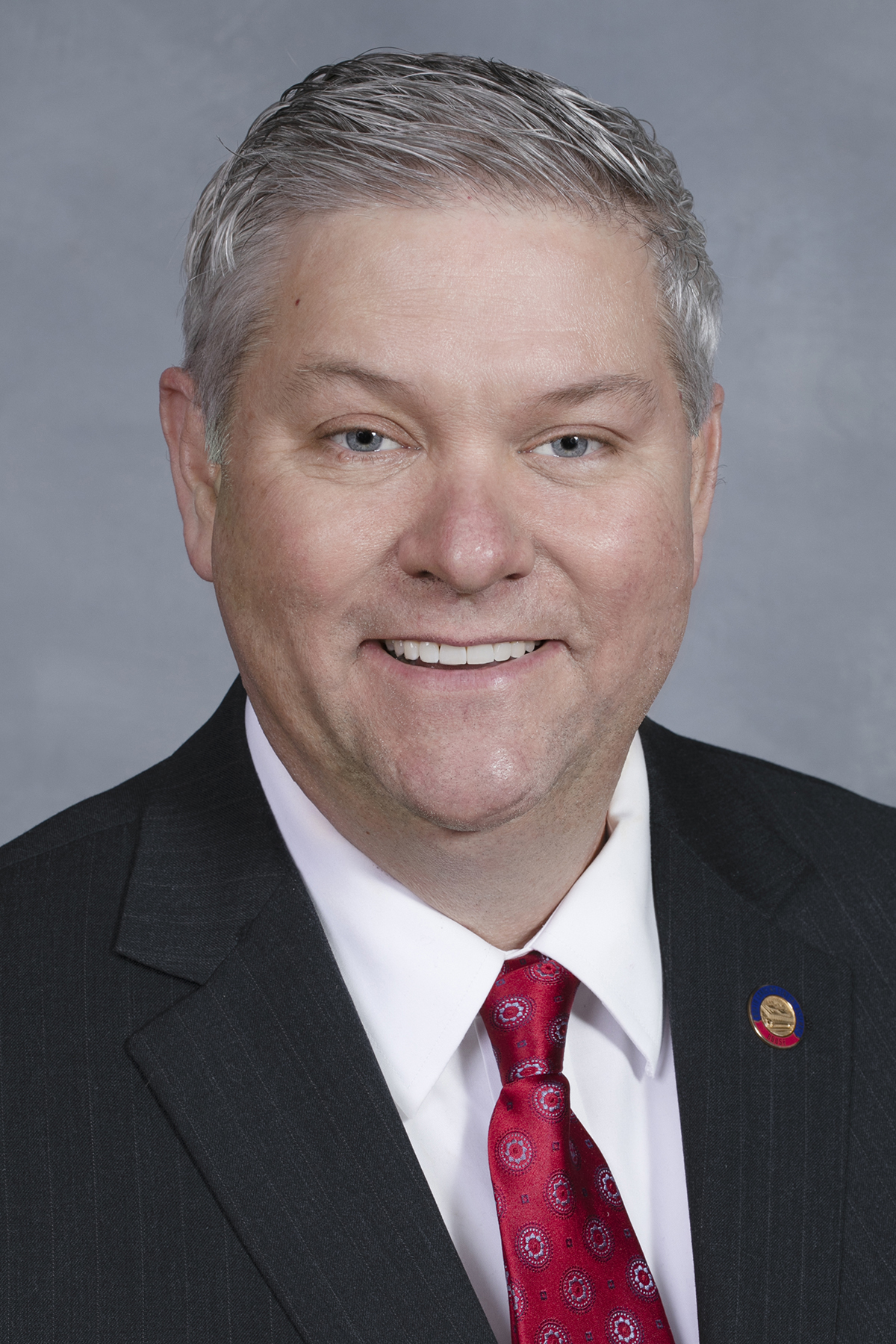

Member of the North Carolina House of Representatives from the 12th district
- Incumbent
- Assumed office January 1, 2019
- Preceded by: George Graham

Personal details
- Party: Republican

Thomas Christopher Humphrey is an American politician from the state of North Carolina. A member of the Republican Party, he represents the 12th district in the North Carolina House of Representatives.

Humphrey served as a county commissioner for Lenoir County, North Carolina. In the 2018 elections, Humphrey ran for the North Carolina House in District 12. He won the election, defeating George Graham, and was sworn into office on January 3, 2019.

== Electoral history ==
=== 2020 ===
North Carolina House of Representatives 12th district general election, 2020
Party	Candidate	Votes	%
Republican	Chris Humphrey (incumbent)	19,732	54.64%
Democratic	Virginia Cox-Daugherty	16,383	45.36%
Total votes		36,115	100%
Republican hold			

=== 2018 ===
North Carolina House of Representatives 12th district general election, 2018
Party	Candidate	Votes	%
Republican	Chris Humphrey	14,494	56.10%
Democratic	George Graham (incumbent)	11,340	43.90%
Total votes		25,834	100%
Republican gain from Democratic			

== Committee assignments ==
=== 2021-2022 session ===
- Insurance (Chair)
- Appropriations
- Appropriations - Agriculture and Natural and Economic Resources
- Agriculture
- Energy and Public Utilities
- Health

=== 2019-2020 session ===
- Insurance
- Appropriations
- Appropriations - Agriculture and Natural and Economic Resources
- Agriculture
- Energy and Public Utilities
- Health
- Finance
- Judiciary

North Carolina House of Representatives
Preceded by George Graham	Member of the North Carolina House of Representatives from the 12th district 2019-Present	Incumbent
