= Shelia P. Moses =

American writer (born 1961)

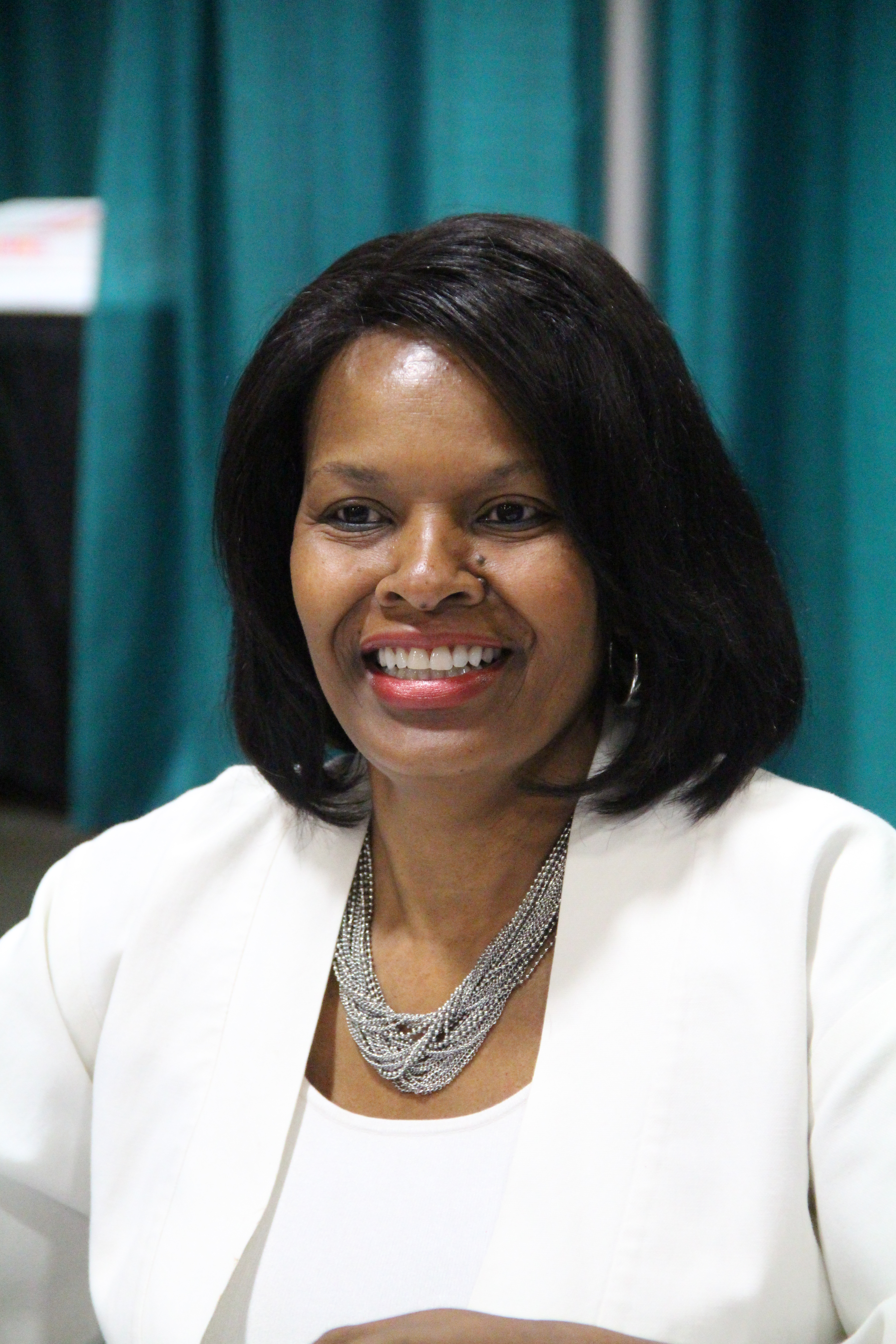
- Born: July 16, 1961 (age 65); Rich Square, North Carolina, U.S.
- Education: Shaw University
- Writing career
- Genre: non-fiction
- Notable awards: Coretta Scott King Award

Shelia P. Moses (born July 16, 1961) is an American writer.

In 2004, she was nominated for the National Book Award and in 2005 she was recognized as a Coretta Scott King Award honoree for her novel The Legend of Buddy Bush. In 2009, her novel Joseph was nominated for the NAACP Image Award.

== Life ==
Moses was born in the small, rural, northeastern North Carolina town of Rich Square. She grew up ninth in a family of ten children; she received her bachelor's degree in Psychology from Shaw University.

== Bibliography ==
- Callus on My Soul: a memoir, by Dick Gregory with Shelia P. Moses, 2000, ISBN 1-56352-554-2
- Sallie Gal and the Wall-a-kee man, 2007, ISBN 978-0-439-90890-0
- The Legend of Buddy Bush, 2004, ISBN 0-689-85839-6; The Legend of Buddy Bush. Simon and Schuster. 12 November 2013. ISBN 978-1-4391-3182-4. (Coretta Scott King Award honor book)
- Joseph. Simon and Schuster. 23 March 2010. ISBN 978-1-4169-9442-8.
- I, Dred Scott, 2005, ISBN 0-689-85975-9
- The Baptism, 2007, ISBN 1-4169-0671-1
- The Return of Buddy Bush. Simon and Schuster. 11 May 2010. ISBN 978-1-4391-1637-1.
- Joseph's Grace. Simon and Schuster. 4 January 2011. ISBN 978-1-4424-0618-6.
- The Sittin' Up. Penguin Young Readers Group. 9 January 2014. ISBN 978-0-698-14958-8.
