= Holoman-Outland House =

Historic house in North Carolina, United States

- Edgewood (Note: Originally listed on the National Register as the "Holoman–Outland House". The listed name was changed in 2017.)
- U.S. National Register of Historic Places
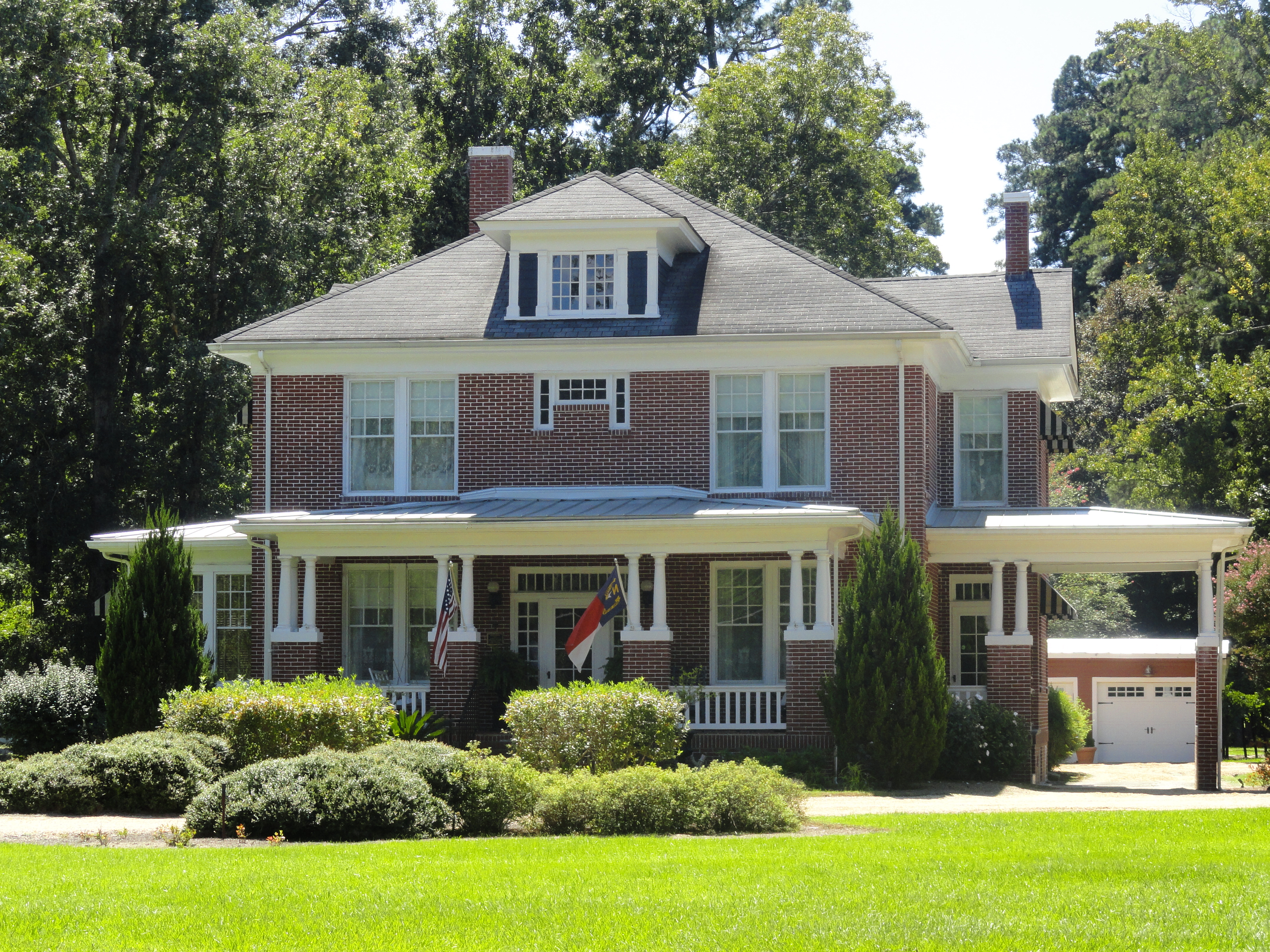

- Location within North Carolina Location within the United States
- Location: NC 305, 0.4 miles (0.64 km) northeast of NC 258, near Rich Square, North Carolina
- Coordinates: 36°16′36″N 77°17′28″W
- Area: 5.3 acres (2.1 ha)
- Built: 1920
- Architectural style: Colonial Revival, foursquare
- NRHP reference No.: 01001114
- Added to NRHP: October 14, 2001

Holoman–Outland House is a historic home located near Rich Square, Northampton County, North Carolina. It was built in 1920, and is a two-story, Colonial Revival / American Foursquare style brick dwelling with a one-story kitchen wing. It has a hipped roof with hipped dormer, full-width one-story front porch with Doric order columns, porte-cochère, and a two-level squared bay with a modified Palladian window. Also on the property are the contributing cow shed (1920) and pump house and smokehouse (1920).

It was listed on the National Register of Historic Places in 2001.
