= Florenza Moore Grant =

American civil rights activist (1921–2001)

Florenza Grant
- Born: December 5, 1921; Rich Square, North Carolina, U.S.
- Died: July 30, 2001 (aged 79); Gloucester County, Virginia, U.S.
- Occupation: Farmer
- Spouse: Matthew Moore Grant
- Children: 5

Florenza Moore Grant (December 5, 1921 – July 30, 2001) was one of the first African-Americans to register to vote in Halifax County, North Carolina, in the 1950s. Her family battled against the USDA claiming there was a discriminatory practice against them. Her family also ran a gas station, barbershop, and other businesses. She had joined the NAACP in her younger years and continued to take part in protests up into her early 30s.

== Early life, education and family ==
Grant was born in Rich Square, North Carolina. She grew up on a farm with her 11 siblings. She graduated high school and got married that year to Matthew Moore Grant who was a ministers son. She and her husband bought a farm in Tillery, North Carolina, and raised 5 children. Grant's husband owned and ran a barber shop while the family ran a gas station. Her son, Gary Moore, after she and her husband died. Moore passed away.

== Battle against the USDA ==
In Tillery, North Carolina, the USDA or the Farm Security Administration (FSA) was tightly controlled by a group of Euro-American males. African-American farmers were settled in the floodplains next to the Roanoke River while the Euro-American farmers were resident in the hillside where flooding did not occur. Along with higher flood risks, African-Americans received fewer allotments. The Grants had been receiving threats of foreclosure by the FSA because of their race. Gary Grant later sued the USDA for practicing racial discrimination in 1997.

== Registering to vote ==
Many African-Americans had been trying to get registered to vote in Halifax County, North Carolina. Groups of people would head down to the courthouse, but get sent away. One Saturday Florenza Moore Grant's husband asked her to try to register. Grant went down to the courthouse and was questioned about her education and if she was willing to abide by the rules while a Euro-American woman around the age of 18 walked right into the courthouse and registered without a problem. Grant had to read and write a portion of the Constitution, but she had been practicing reading and writing the constitution. She got to correct the registrar a few times and passed with ease. The registrar was livid with Grant, but he registered her.

== See also ==
- Civil rights movement – 1954–1968 U.S. social movement
