= Lenoir County Courthouse =

- U.S. National Register of Historic Places
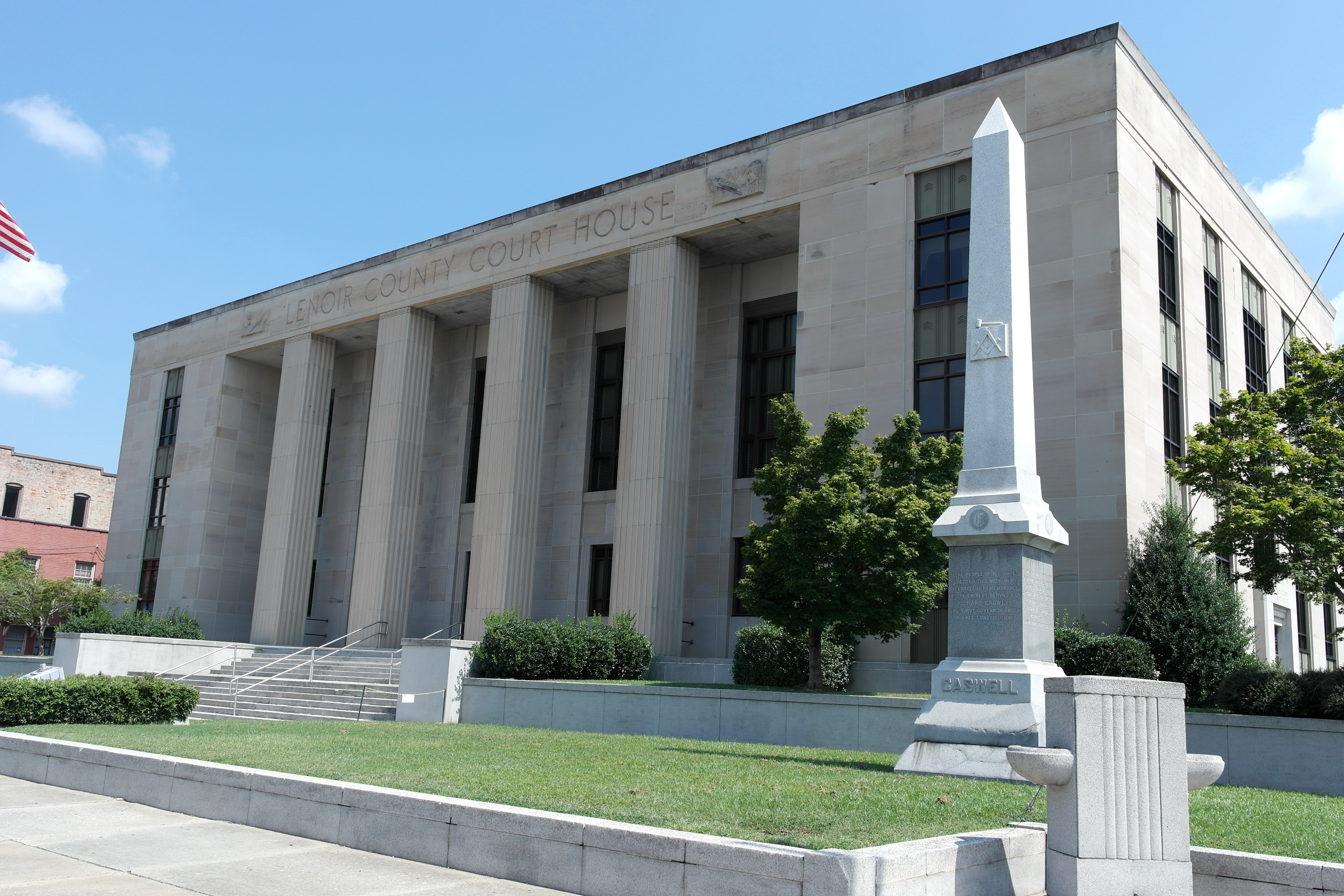
- Lenoir County Courthouse, September 2013

- Location within North Carolina Location within the United States
- Location: Queen and Kings Sts., Kinston, North Carolina
- Coordinates: 35°15′30″N 77°34′25″W
- Area: 2 acres (0.81 ha)
- Built: 1939
- Architect: Wooton, A. Mitchell; Loving, T.A.
- Architectural style: Moderne, Streamline
- MPS: North Carolina County Courthouses TR
- NRHP reference No.: 79001730
- Added to NRHP: May 10, 1979

Lenoir County Courthouse is a historic courthouse located at Kinston, Lenoir County, North Carolina. It was built in 1939, and is a three-story, H-shaped, Moderne style building. It is faced with a limestone veneer and accented by streamlined, stylized ornament. It features a tetrastyle in antis portico of square fluted piers.

It was listed on the National Register of Historic Places in 1979.
