= George Graham (North Carolina politician) =

American politician (1949–2022)

George W. Graham Jr.

Member of the North Carolina House of Representatives from the 12th district
- In office January 1, 2013 – January 1, 2019
- Preceded by: Barbara Lee
- Succeeded by: Chris Humphrey

Personal details
- Born: February 16, 1949
- Died: May 15, 2022 (aged 73)
- Party: Democratic
- Occupation: Businessman

George W. Graham Jr. (February 16, 1949 – May 15, 2022) was a former Democratic member of the North Carolina General Assembly. He represented the 12th district. Graham served the NC House from 2013 through 2018 and served as member of the Lenoir County Board of Commissioners for over 30 years.

North Carolina House of Representatives
Preceded by Barbara Lee	Member of the North Carolina House of Representatives from the 12th district 2013-2019	Succeeded by Chris Humphrey
