= Duke-Lawrence House =

Historic house in North Carolina, United States

- U.S. National Register of Historic Places
- Location within North Carolina Location within the United States
- Location: East of Rich Square off NC 305/561, near Rich Square, North Carolina
- Coordinates: 36°16′4″N 77°15′9″W
- Area: 2.9 acres (1.2 ha)
- Built: c. 1747, 1787-1796
- Architectural style: Georgian
- NRHP reference No.: 80002892
- Added to NRHP: October 22, 1980

Duke-Lawrence House, also known as Lawrence House and Shoulars House, is a historic plantation house located near Rich Square, Northampton County, North Carolina. The original western frame section was built about 1747, with the eastern brick section built between 1787 and 1796. It is a T-shaped Georgian style dwelling that consists of a 1 1/2-story, brick section and the original three bay frame section with a brick end. It features a split-level floor arrangement and a sloping one-story roofline to the rear. The interior woodwork was removed in the 1930s and installed in "Willow Oaks" in Richmond, Virginia.

It was listed on the National Register of Historic Places in 1980.
