= North Carolina Highway 149 =

State highway in Washington County, North Carolina, US

North Carolina Highway 149
- Ken Trowbridge Road

Route information
- Maintained by NCDOT
- Length: 1.2 mi (1.9 km)
- Existed: 1987–present

Major junctions
- South end: US 64 in Plymouth
- North end: Plymouth Pulp Mill near Plymouth

Location
- Country: United States
- State: North Carolina
- Counties: Washington

Highway system
- North Carolina Highway System; Interstate; US; State; Scenic
← NC 148	→ NC 150

North Carolina Highway 149 (NC 149) is a primary state highway in the U.S. state of North Carolina. The highway provides direct access from US 64 to the Plymouth Pulp Mill.

== Route description ==
NC 149 is a short 1.17-mile (1.88 km) two-lane highway, connecting US 64 with the Domtar's Plymouth Pulp Mill, where they make Cellulose fiber and Fluff pulp. A gate is located just past from where state maintenance ends.

== History ==
NC 149 was established by 1987 as a new primary spur from US 64 to the Plymouth Pulp Mill, an upgrade of Ken Trowbridge Road (SR 1341). It has remained unchanged since inception.

== Junction list ==
The entire route is in Plymouth, Washington County.

mi	km	Destinations	Notes
0.00	0.00	US 64 – Williamston, Columbia	
1.17	1.88	Plymouth Pulp Mill	Gate entrance, restricted access
1.000 mi = 1.609 km; 1.000 km = 0.621 mi
