= Mills Darden =

Alleged largest man in history (1799–1857)

- Born: October 7, 1799; Near Rich Square, North Carolina, U.S.
- Died: January 23, 1857 (aged 57)
- Resting place: Mills Darden Cemetery; Henderson County, Tennessee, U.S.
- Known for: Extreme height and weight
- Height: 7 ft 6 in (2.29 m)

Mills Darden (October 7, 1799 – January 23, 1857) was an American who became famous as one of the largest men ever in human history. His enormous size both in terms of his body weight and height made him one of the biggest humans to have ever lived. It was said his resting blood pressure averaged 237/138. He was officially confirmed to have stood at a height of 7 ft 6 in (229 cm) tall and weighed more than 1,000 lb (450 kg), with a shoulder-to-shoulder width measurement of about 6 ft (1.8 m). These figures would have given him a body mass index of 74.6–92.9.

Mills (or Miles) Darden was born on October 7, 1799, near Rich Square, North Carolina, United States, to John and Mary Darden. He was married twice and had several children. His first wife Mary died in 1837 aged about 40.They had seven children. The name of his second wife was given in the census as Tameria. They had four children.

He died on January 23, 1857, and was buried in Lexington, Tennessee. His grave, and his wife's, have been restored by the local Development Authority.

== See also ==
- List of the heaviest people
- List of tallest people
