= North Carolina's 12th House district =

American legislative district

North Carolina's 12th State House of Representatives district
Representative
Chris Humphrey; R–Kinston
- Demographics: 49% White; 36% Black; 10% Hispanic; 1% Asian; 4% Multiracial
- Population (2024): 84,707

North Carolina's 12th House district is one of 120 districts in the North Carolina House of Representatives. It has been represented by Republican Chris Humphrey since 2019.

== Geography ==
Since 2023, the district has included all of Greene, Lenoir, and Jones counties. The district overlaps with the 3rd, 4th, and 9th Senate districts.

== District officeholders ==
=== Multi-member district ===
Representative	Party	Dates	Notes	Representative	Party	Dates	Notes	Counties
Chatham Clark (Elizabethtown)	Democratic	January 1, 1967 – January 1, 1969		C. Graham Tart (Clinton)	Democratic	January 1, 1967 – January 1, 1973	Redistricted from the Sampson County district. Redistricted to the 19th district.	1967–1973; All of Bladen and Sampson counties.
Jimmy Green (Clarkton)	Democratic	January 1, 1969 – January 1, 1973	Redistricted to the 19th district.	C. Graham Tart (Clinton)	Democratic	January 1, 1967 – January 1, 1973	Redistricted from the Sampson County district. Redistricted to the 19th district.	1967–1973; All of Bladen and Sampson counties.
Benjamin Schwartz (Wilmington)	Democratic	January 1, 1973 – January 1, 1979	Retired to run for State Senate.	S. Thomas Rhodes (Wilmington)	Republican	January 1, 1973 – January 1, 1983	Redistricted to the 13th district.	1973–1983; All of New Hanover County.
Eugene Merritt (Wilmington)	Democratic	January 1, 1979 – January 1, 1981		S. Thomas Rhodes (Wilmington)	Republican	January 1, 1973 – January 1, 1983	Redistricted to the 13th district.	1973–1983; All of New Hanover County.
Harry Payne Jr. (Wilmington)	Democratic	January 1, 1981 – January 1, 1983	Redistricted to the 13th district.	S. Thomas Rhodes (Wilmington)	Republican	January 1, 1973 – January 1, 1983	Redistricted to the 13th district.	1973–1983; All of New Hanover County.
Edward Bowen (Harrells)	Democratic	January 1, 1983 – January 1, 1985		Murray Pool (Clinton)	Democratic	January 1, 1983 – January 1, 1987		1983–1993; All of Bladen and Sampson counties Part of Pender County.
Edd Nye (Elizabethtown)	Democratic	January 1, 1985 – January 1, 1993	Redistricted to the 96th district.	Murray Pool (Clinton)	Democratic	January 1, 1983 – January 1, 1987		1983–1993; All of Bladen and Sampson counties Part of Pender County.
Edd Nye (Elizabethtown)	Democratic	January 1, 1985 – January 1, 1993	Redistricted to the 96th district.	Edward Bowen (Harrells)	Democratic	January 1, 1987 – January 1, 1993	Redistricted to the single-member district.	1983–1993; All of Bladen and Sampson counties Part of Pender County.

=== Single-member district ===
Representative	Party	Dates	Notes	Counties
Edward Bowen (Harrells)	Democratic	January 1, 1993 – January 1, 1997	Redistricted from the multi-member district.	1993–2003; Parts of Sampson, Pender, and Onslow counties.
Nurham Warwick (Clinton)	Democratic	January 1, 1997 – January 1, 2003	Redistricted to the 22nd district and lost re-nomination.	1993–2003; Parts of Sampson, Pender, and Onslow counties.
William Wainwright (Havelock)	Democratic	January 1, 2003 – July 17, 2012	Redistricted from the 79th district. Died.	2003–2005; All of Jones County. Parts of Lenoir and Craven counties.
William Wainwright (Havelock)	Democratic	January 1, 2003 – July 17, 2012	Redistricted from the 79th district. Died.	2005–2013; Parts of Lenoir and Craven counties.
Vacant		July 17, 2012 – August 6, 2012		2005–2013; Parts of Lenoir and Craven counties.
Barbara Lee (New Bern)	Democratic	August 6, 2012 – January 1, 2013	Appointed to finish Wainwright's term. Retired.	2005–2013; Parts of Lenoir and Craven counties.
George Graham (Kinston)	Democratic	January 1, 2013 – January 1, 2019	Lost re-election.	2013–2019; Parts of Greene, Lenoir, and Craven counties.
Chris Humphrey (Kinston)	Republican	January 1, 2019 – Present		2019–2023; All of Lenoir County. Part of Pitt County.
Chris Humphrey (Kinston)	Republican	January 1, 2019 – Present		2023–Present; All of Greene, Lenoir, and Jones counties.

== Election results ==
=== 2024 ===
North Carolina House of Representatives 12th district general election, 2024
Party	Candidate	Votes	%
Republican	Chris Humphrey (incumbent)	23,116	57.28%
Democratic	Lillie Williams	16,696	41.37%
Green	Adrien Meadows	546	1.35%
Total votes		40,358	100%
Republican hold			

=== 2022 ===
North Carolina House of Representatives 12th district general election, 2022
Party	Candidate	Votes	%
Republican	Chris Humphrey (incumbent)	17,486	61.42%
Democratic	Lillie Williams	10,983	38.58%
Total votes		28,469	100%
Republican hold			

=== 2020 ===
North Carolina House of Representatives 12th district Democratic primary election, 2020
Party	Candidate	Votes	%
Democratic	Virginia Cox-Daugherty	3,973	51.53%
Democratic	Deonko Brewer	2,863	37.13%
Democratic	Lenton Credelle Brown	874	11.34%
Total votes		7,710	100%

North Carolina House of Representatives 12th district general election, 2020
Party	Candidate	Votes	%
Republican	Chris Humphrey (incumbent)	19,732	54.64%
Democratic	Virginia Cox-Daugherty	16,383	45.36%
Total votes		36,115	100%
Republican hold			

=== 2018 ===
North Carolina House of Representatives 12th district general election, 2018
Party	Candidate	Votes	%
Republican	Chris Humphrey	14,494	56.10%
Democratic	George Graham (incumbent)	11,340	43.90%
Total votes		25,834	100%
Republican gain from Democratic			

=== 2016 ===
North Carolina House of Representatives 12th district general election, 2016
Party	Candidate	Votes	%
Democratic	George Graham (incumbent)	23,689	100%
Total votes		23,689	100%
Democratic hold			

=== 2014 ===
North Carolina House of Representatives 12th district general election, 2014
Party	Candidate	Votes	%
Democratic	George Graham (incumbent)	16,301	100%
Total votes		16,301	100%
Democratic hold			

=== 2012 ===
North Carolina House of Representatives 12th district general election, 2012
Party	Candidate	Votes	%
Democratic	George Graham	22,064	65.85%
Republican	Jim Dancy	11,443	34.15%
Total votes		33,507	100%
Democratic hold			

=== 2010 ===
North Carolina House of Representatives 12th district general election, 2010
Party	Candidate	Votes	%
Democratic	William Wainwright (incumbent)	9,390	60.21%
Republican	Mark W. Griffin	6,206	39.79%
Total votes		15,596	100%
Democratic hold			

=== 2008 ===
North Carolina House of Representatives 12th district general election, 2008
Party	Candidate	Votes	%
Democratic	William Wainwright (incumbent)	17,659	69.14%
Republican	Mark W. Griffin	7,882	30.86%
Total votes		25,541	100%
Democratic hold			

=== 2006 ===
North Carolina House of Representatives 12th district general election, 2006
Party	Candidate	Votes	%
Democratic	William Wainwright (incumbent)	7,941	66.28%
Republican	John Percy Wetherington Jr.	4,040	33.72%
Total votes		11,981	100%
Democratic hold			

=== 2004 ===
North Carolina House of Representatives 12th district general election, 2004
Party	Candidate	Votes	%
Democratic	William Wainwright (incumbent)	13,573	64.49%
Republican	John Percy Wetherington Jr.	7,473	35.51%
Total votes		21,046	100%
Democratic hold			

=== 2002 ===
North Carolina House of Representatives 12th district general election, 2002
Party	Candidate	Votes	%
Democratic	William Wainwright (incumbent)	12,173	87.24%
Libertarian	Alan Christopher Stimson	1,781	12.76%
Total votes		13,954	100%
Democratic hold			

=== 2000 ===
North Carolina House of Representatives 12th district general election, 2000
Party	Candidate	Votes	%
Democratic	Nurham Warwick (incumbent)	12,574	54.88%
Republican	Ted Brown	10,337	45.12%
Total votes		22,911	100%
Democratic hold			
