= Murphey, North Carolina =

- Unincorporated community
- Location within North Carolina Location within the United States
- Country: United States
- State: North Carolina
- County: Duplin
- Elevation: 46 ft (14 m)
- Time zone: UTC-5 (Eastern (EST))
  - Summer (DST): UTC-4 (EDT)
- Area codes: 910, 472
- GNIS feature ID: 1021588

Murphey is an unincorporated community in Duplin County, North Carolina, United States, on NC 11, east of I-40, at an elevation of 46 ft.
