= Grifton, North Carolina =

- Town
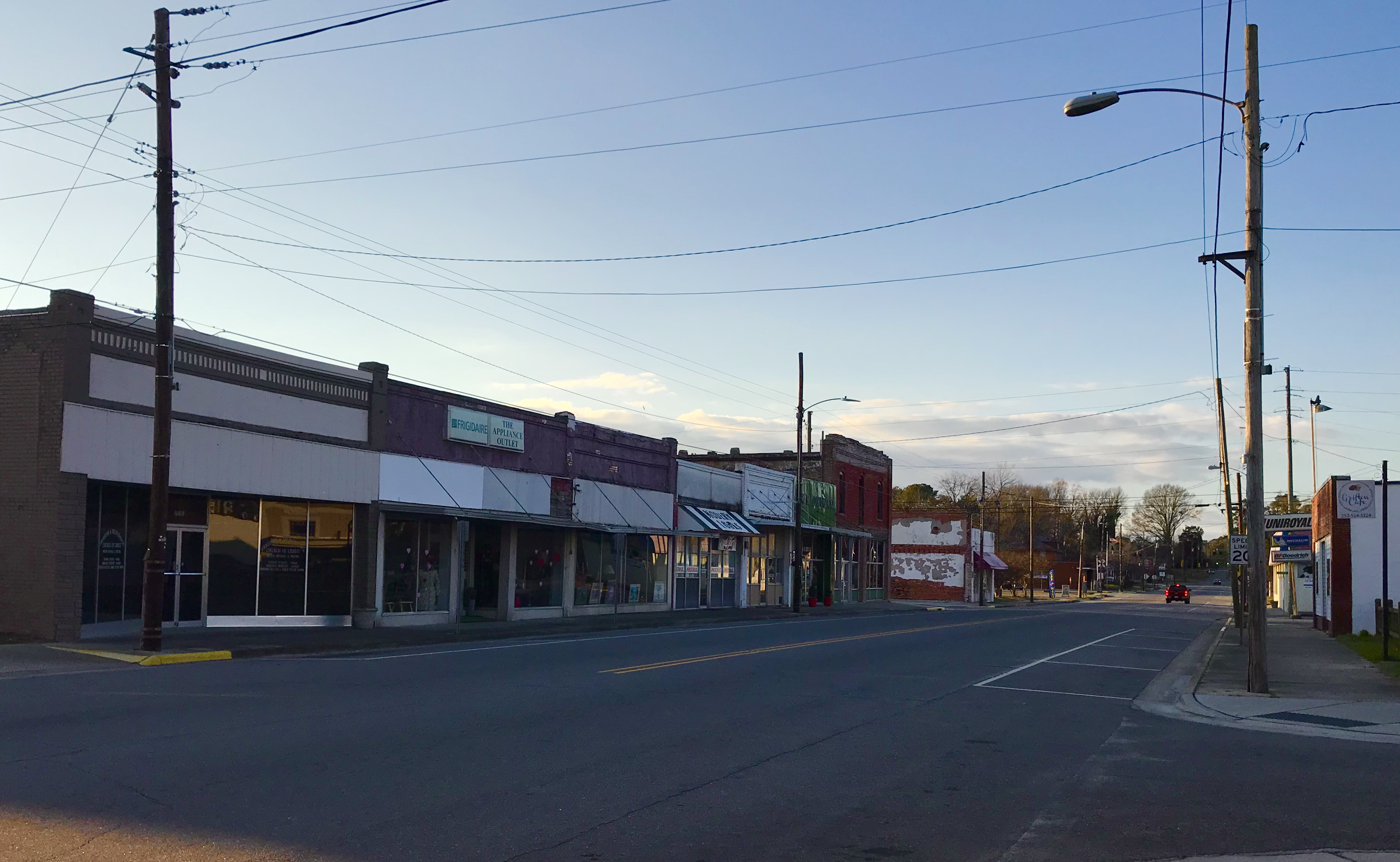
- Commercial buildings along Queen Street

- Seal
- Nickname: "The 'Shad' Capital of North Carolina"
- Motto: "Come Home To...The Family Town!"
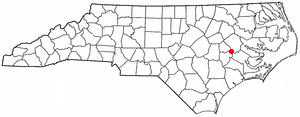
- Location of Grifton, North Carolina
- Coordinates: 35°22′22″N 77°26′33″W
- Country: United States
- State: North Carolina
- Counties: Lenoir, Pitt

Government
  - Mayor: Billy Ray Jackson

Area
  - Total: 2.68 sq mi (6.95 km^{2})
  - Land: 2.68 sq mi (6.95 km^{2})
  - Water: 0 sq mi (0.00 km^{2})
- Elevation: 20 ft (6.1 m)

Population (2020)
  - Total: 2,448
  - Density: 912.6/sq mi (352.36/km^{2})
- Time zone: UTC-5 (Eastern (EST))
  - Summer (DST): UTC-4 (EDT)
- ZIP code: 28530
- Area code: 252
- FIPS code: 37-28200
- GNIS feature ID: 2406620
- Website: www.grifton.com

Grifton is a town in Lenoir and Pitt counties, North Carolina, United States. The population was 2,448 at the 2020 census. The Pitt County portion of the town is a part of the Greenville Metropolitan Statistical Area located in North Carolina's Inner Banks region.

== History ==
Settlement in the area dates back to 1756, when the locale was known as Peter's Ferry. By 1764, it was known as Blount's Ford. In the 1800s according to local knowledge, the Contentnea Creek bridge was set ablaze during the Civil War, prompting Mr. Coward to construct a replacement bridge in 1867. However, this bridge had a short lifespan, leading Franklin Bell, a nearby blacksmith and chair-maker, to operate a ferry across the creek. As a result, the location earned the name Bell's Ferry, which persisted even after the county erected a fresh bridge over the creek in 1869. It was incorporated under that name in 1883. The name was formally changed to Grifton six years later to honor local merchant C. M. A. Griffin. Soon thereafter, it became styled as Grifton.

== Geography ==
Grifton is located on the southern edge of Pitt County mostly on the northeastern side of Contentnea Creek, which forms the county line. A small portion of the town is on the southwestern side of the creek in Lenoir County. North Carolina Highway 11 passes just west of the town, leading north 13 miles (21 km) to Greenville, the Pitt county seat, and southwest 7 miles (11 km) to Kinston, the Lenoir county seat.

According to the United States Census Bureau, the town has a total area of 2.73 square miles (7.07 km^{2}), all land. Contentnea Creek is a southeastward-flowing tributary of the Neuse River.

== Demographics ==
Historical population
Census	Pop.	Note	%±
1890	121		—
1900	229		89.3%
1910	291		27.1%
1920	375		28.9%
1930	403		7.5%
1940	456		13.2%
1950	510		11.8%
1960	1,816		256.1%
1970	1,860		2.4%
1980	2,179		17.2%
1990	2,393		9.8%
2000	2,073		−13.4%
2010	2,617		26.2%
2020	2,448		−6.5%
U.S. Decennial Census

=== 2020 census ===
As of the 2020 census, Grifton had a population of 2,448. The median age was 39.9 years. 24.4% of residents were under the age of 18 and 19.6% were 65 years of age or older. For every 100 females there were 85.7 males, and for every 100 females age 18 and over there were 81.3 males age 18 and over. There were 762 families residing in the town.

0.0% of residents lived in urban areas, while 100.0% lived in rural areas.

There were 962 households in Grifton, of which 34.0% had children under the age of 18 living in them. Of all households, 36.9% were married-couple households, 15.9% were households with a male householder and no spouse or partner present, and 41.5% were households with a female householder and no spouse or partner present. About 29.2% of all households were made up of individuals and 14.0% had someone living alone who was 65 years of age or older.

There were 1,089 housing units, of which 11.7% were vacant. The homeowner vacancy rate was 2.1% and the rental vacancy rate was 4.5%.

Grifton racial composition
Race	Number	Percentage
White (non-Hispanic)	1,107	45.22%
Black or African American (non-Hispanic)	978	39.95%
Native American	6	0.25%
Asian	7	0.29%
Pacific Islander	2	0.08%
Other/Mixed	86	3.51%
Hispanic or Latino	262	10.7%

=== 2000 census ===
As of the census of 2000, there were 2,073 people, 812 households, and 583 families residing in the town. The population density was 1,209.4 inhabitants per square mile (467.0/km^{2}). There were 1,092 housing units at an average density of 637.1 per square mile (246.0/km^{2}). The racial makeup of the town was 63.24% White, 33.19% African American, 0.19% Native American, 0.05% Asian, 0.24% Pacific Islander, 2.32% from other races, and 0.77% from two or more races. 4.73% of the population were Hispanic or Latino of any race.

== Education ==
Grifton is served by Grifton School with grades Pre-K through 8. It is administered by the Pitt County Public School system. High school students attend nearby Ayden-Grifton High School, which is located between Ayden and Grifton. Just south of Grifton is the private K-12 school Arendell Parrott Academy.

Higher education is provided through Pitt Community College in Winterville and Lenoir Community College in Kinston. East Carolina University is located north of Grifton in Greenville.

== Constructions ==
The WITN tower is a guyed TV mast with a height of 1,985 feet (605 m) located in the town.

== Local events ==
=== Shad Festival ===
In 1971, citizens in the town of Grifton established the annual Grifton Shad Festival as a way to increase interest in the town and to provide family-oriented fun for all ages working together. The Shad Festival was suggested by then North Carolina extension agent Ed Comer. Most events are free and outdoors. There are now 40 events, ranging from parade and pony rides to art show, clogging, Hispanic dances, lying contest, historical museum and athletic competitions, including the Shad Toss (throwing real fish).

The annual celebration includes:

- Hickory Shad fishing contest starting January 1
- SHAD-O (Grifton's version of Bingo)
- The "Miss Grifton" pageant, a competition for high-school aged girls
- Carnival rides and games
- Craft show
- Food prepared by local churches and civic organizations
- Saturday night street dance featuring local bands

=== John Lawson Legacy Days ===
John Lawson Legacy Days is an annual event held at the Grifton Historical Museum and Indian Village, focusing on reenactors, historic interpreters, and historical technology demonstrations. The event was first held in 2010 and is named after John Lawson, an English explorer, naturalist and surveyor who traveled through the Carolinas in 1701 and published a book about his travels in 1709. Lawson was killed by a group of Tuscarora near Grifton in 1711.

=== Back-N-Time Book Club ===
Back-N-Time Book Club is a book club organized by the Grifton Historical Museum in combination with North Carolina Literacy to introduce children and adults to reading.
