= North Carolina Highway 148 =

State highway in Lenoir County, North Carolina, US

North Carolina Highway 148
- C.F. Harvey Parkway
- NC 148 highlighted in red

Route information
- Maintained by NCDOT
- Length: 13.2 mi (21.2 km)
- Existed: 2009–present

Major junctions
- West end: US 70 near Kinston
- US 258 near Kinston; NC 58 near Kinston
- East end: NC 11 near Kinston

Location
- Country: United States
- State: North Carolina
- Counties: Lenoir

Highway system
- North Carolina Highway System; Interstate; US; State; Scenic
← NC 147	→ NC 149

North Carolina Highway 148 (NC 148), also known as the C.F. Harvey Parkway, is a 13.2-mile (21.2 km) east–west state highway that connects US 70 to NC 11 in Lenoir County. The route is completely located within Lenoir County and runs near the NC Global TransPark and Kinston Regional Jetport, serving as a bypass of Kinston. The entire route is a four-lane rural expressway, with a maximum speed limit of 65 miles per hour (105 km/h). The highway is named after entrepreneur, businessman, and banker C. Felix Harvey III (1920-2014), who was born and raised in Kinston.

== Route description ==
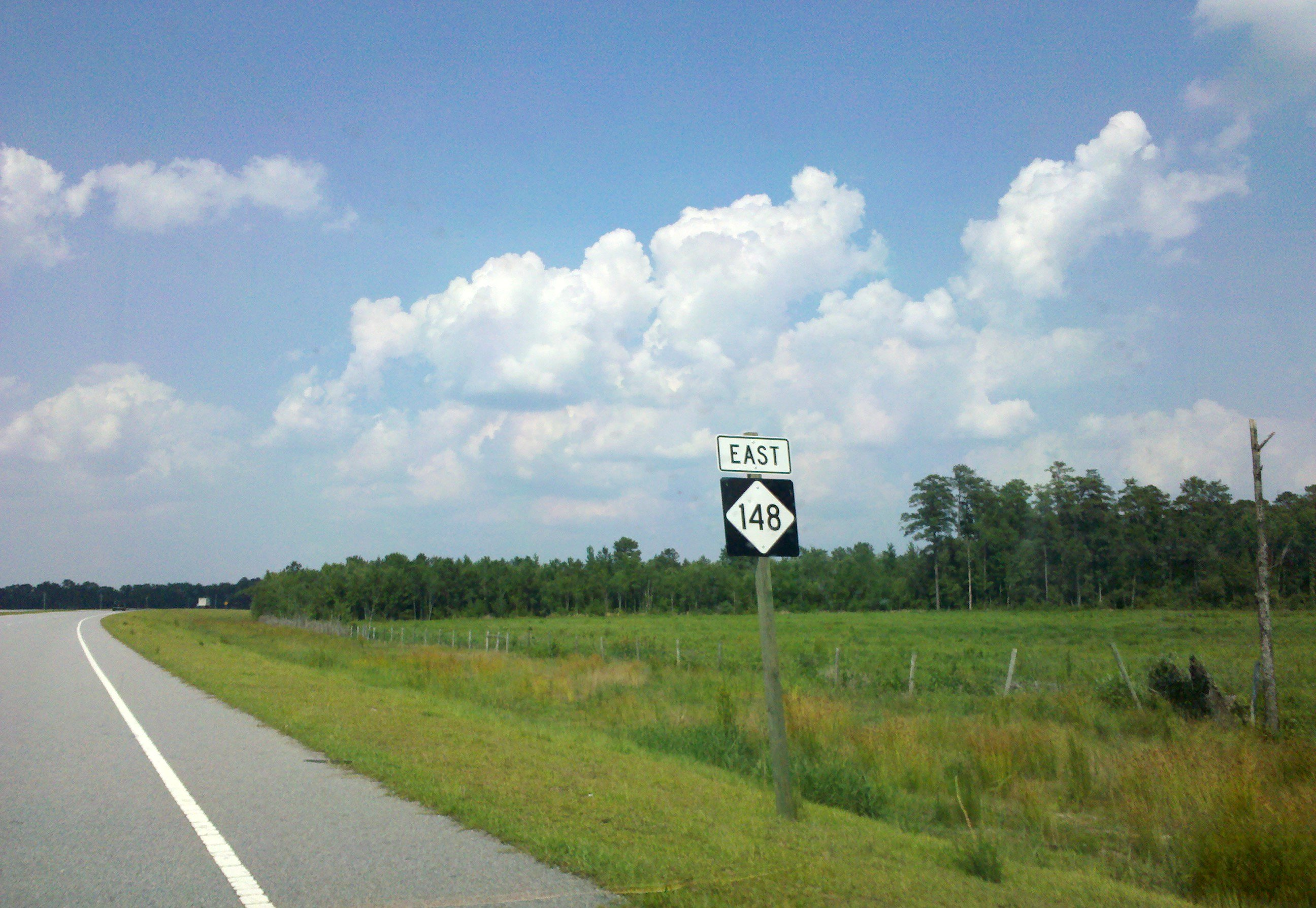
Eastbound NC 148

NC 148 begins at an interchange with US 70 west of Kinston. The highway then proceeds northward, paralleling US 258 before crossing and having an interchange with each other. Turning eastward, the highway runs around the south side of Kinston Regional Jetport and NC Global Transpark before having an interchange with NC 58. Continuing eastward, NC 148 ends at an interchange with NC 11 northeast of Kinston.

== History ==
The first section between Rouse Road and NC 58 was completed in May 2001 at a cost of $6.6 million. The route for the third section of the highway was chosen in July 2002. The roadway was named for C. Felix Harvey in August 2002. The second section between US 258 and Rouse Road was finished in August 2003 for $8.2 million. The third section between US 70 and US 258 was opened on May 22, 2014. The extension involved the construction of 12 bridges and 2 highway interchanges. The roadway was formally dedicated in November 2003 for the local leader behind the Global Transpark. A 5.8-mile (9.3 km) extension from NC 58 to NC 11 north of Kinston, planned to improve connectivity in northern Kinston between US 70, NC 58 and NC 11, opened to traffic on March 1, 2021.

== Future ==
The parkway is expected to be extended a short distance to the south to Sanderson Way. This will be part of the US 70 upgrade to I-42 project.

== Major intersections ==
The entire route is in Kinston, Lenoir County.

mi	km	Destinations	Notes
		Sanderson Way	Future western terminus
0.0	0.0	US 70 – Kinston, Goldsboro	Interchange, western terminus
3.2	5.1	US 258 – Kinston, Snow Hill	Interchange
8.0	12.9	NC 58 – Kinston, Snow Hill	Interchange
13.2	21.2	NC 11 – Kinston, Greenville	Interchange, eastern terminus
1.000 mi = 1.609 km; 1.000 km = 0.621 mi
