= Sandyfield, North Carolina =

- Town
- Seal

- Location within the state of North Carolina
- Coordinates: 34°22′26″N 78°18′00″W
- Country: United States
- State: North Carolina
- County: Columbus

Government
  - Mayor: Garry A. Keaton

Area
  - Total: 3.09 sq mi (8.00 km^{2})
  - Land: 3.08 sq mi (7.98 km^{2})
  - Water: 0.0077 sq mi (0.02 km^{2})
- Elevation: 39 ft (12 m)

Population (2020)
  - Total: 430
  - Density: 140/sq mi (53.9/km^{2})
- Time zone: UTC-5 (Eastern (EST))
  - Summer (DST): UTC-4 (EDT)
- ZIP code: 28456
- Area codes: 910, 472
- FIPS code: 37-59135
- GNIS feature ID: 2407285
- Website: townofsandyfield.org

Sandyfield is a town in Columbus County, North Carolina, United States. The population was 430 at the 2020 census.

== Geography ==
According to the United States Census Bureau, the town has a total area of 3.5 square miles (9.1 km^{2}), of which 3.4 square miles (8.8 km^{2}) is land and 0.29% is water.

== Demographics ==
Historical population
Census	Pop.	Note	%±
2000	340		—
2010	447		31.5%
2020	430		−3.8%
U.S. Decennial Census

As of the census of 2000, there were 340 people, 115 households, and 90 families residing in the town. The population density was 98.8 inhabitants per square mile (38.1/km^{2}). There were 135 housing units at an average density of 39.2 per square mile (15.1/km^{2}). The racial makeup of the town was 8.82% White, 86.76% African American, 0.59% Native American, 2.06% from other races, and 1.76% from two or more races. Hispanic or Latino of any race were 2.06% of the population.

There were 115 households, out of which 42.6% had children under the age of 18 living with them, 52.2% were married couples living together, 21.7% had a female householder with no husband present, and 21.7% were non-families. 18.3% of all households were made up of individuals, and 10.4% had someone living alone who was 65 years of age or older. The average household size was 2.96 and the average family size was 3.36.

In the town, the population was spread out, with 32.9% under the age of 18, 8.5% from 18 to 24, 27.6% from 25 to 44, 19.4% from 45 to 64, and 11.5% who were 65 years of age or older. The median age was 33 years. For every 100 females, there were 96.5 males. For every 100 females age 18 and over, there were 82.4 males.

The median income for a household in the town was $30,938, and the median income for a family was $38,125. Males had a median income of $41,250 versus $19,688 for females. The per capita income for the town was $14,521. About 14.6% of families and 20.1% of the population were below the poverty line, including 29.6% of those under age 18 and 27.5% of those age 65 or over.
