= Rich Square, North Carolina =

American town

Rich Square Richsquare
- Town
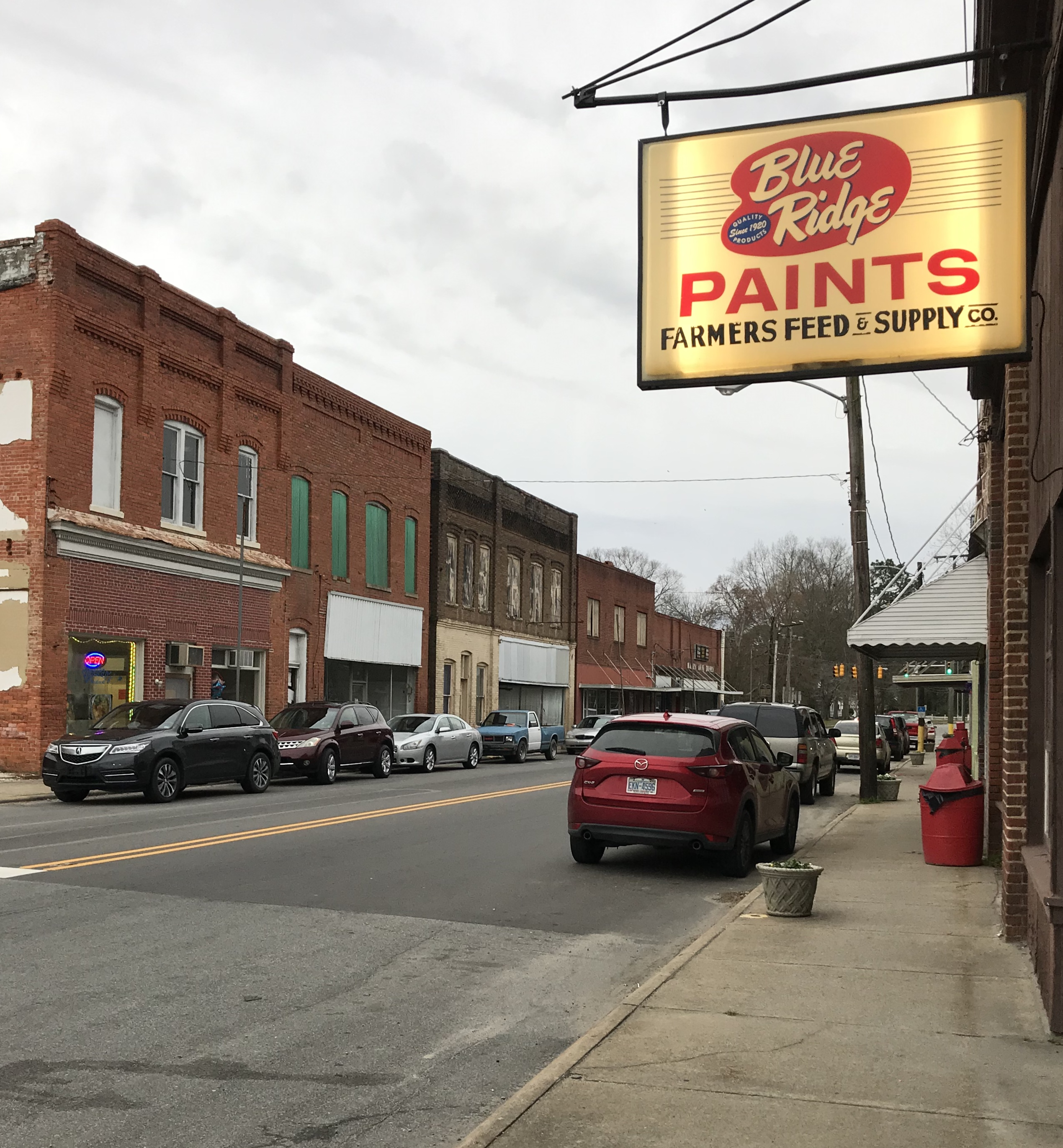
- Commercial buildings in Rich Square (2020)

- Location within North Carolina
- Coordinates: 36.2739423°N 77.2839064°W
- Country: United States
- State: North Carolina
- County: Northampton
- Elevation: 72 ft (22 m)

Population (2020 United States census)
  - Total: 894
- Time zone: UTC−05:00 (EST)
  - Summer (DST): UTC−04:00 (EDT)
- ZIP Code: 27869
- Area code: 252
- GNIS feature ID: 2407205
- Website: richsquarenc.org

Rich Square (also known as Richsquare) is an American town of 894 people in Northampton County, North Carolina.

== History ==
Quakers were some of the earliest settlers in Northampton County, being established there by the early 1750s. The congregation in Rich Square was established in 1760, and was once a center for the Religious Society of Friends in North Carolina. By 1832, they were a minority in Rich Square, though they continued working to relocate former slaves into free states.

In 1947, Godwin Bush was a black man in Northampton County who escaped a lynching by a white mob; two all-white grand juries refused to indict the seven white kidnappers. In response, local pastor and businessman Paul A. Bishop promoted a black-led boycott of white-owned businesses in Rich Square (contemporaneously described by a black community leader as "a town that didn't like black folk.") Many of the boycotted stores went out of business.

On July 26, 1959, Lieutenant Colonel William Rankin was flying his US Marine Corps F8U Crusader from Naval Air Station South Weymouth in Massachusetts to Naval Air Station Beaufort in South Carolina. When he lost all power at an altitude of 47,000 feet (14,000 m), he ejected into the −70 °F (−57 °C) air and began uncontrolled decompression through an intense thunderstorm and hail for the next 40 minutes. After "the most prolonged and fantastic parachute descent in history", he eventually landed near Rich Square, from where he was rescued by a local farmer and eventually taken to Ahoskie, North Carolina for triage. (The plane came down near Scotland Neck, North Carolina.)

In 1968, the federal government of the United States established the Family Development Training Project in Rich Square, an effort up uplift families in poverty by simultaneously educating all members thereof at government expense. On a 50-acre (20 ha) parcel of town, twelve training and support buildings were constructed to support the 50 families living in 50 colocated mobile homes. Eligible families must have been employed by two or more employers in the preceding year, and annually earn less than US$2,500 (equivalent to $23,146 in 2025). In 1974, The Family Coordinator called the five-year program "one of the most unique and successful programs ever developed in the United States".

The Duke-Lawrence House is a recognized example of Georgian architecture in Rich Square, and it was added to the National Register of Historic Places in October 1980. The local Holoman-Outland House was recognized for its Colonial Revival architecture and listed on the register in October 2001.

== Geography ==
The town of Rich Square is located in Northampton County, North Carolina, at 36.2739423°N 77.2839064°W, with an elevation of 22 meters (72 ft).

== Demographics ==
As of the 2020 United States census, the population of Rich Square was 894 people in 337 of the town's 414 housing units. The median age was 62.2 (± 7.4), with 44.5 percent (± 10.7%) of the town aged 65 or older, and only 9.1 percent (± 4.8%) under 18.

In Rich Square, 4.4 percent (± 4.1%) of residents were foreign-born (all of whom were naturalized citizens), and only 5.0 percent (± 4.4%) spoke a language other than English at home. Four residents (0.4%) were Native Americans, one (0.1%) was Asian, 578 (64.7%) were Black or African American, 26 (2.9%) were Hispanic or Latino, 270 (31.1%) were White people, nine (1%) were of another race or ethnicity, and 24 (2.7%) were multiracial people.

In town, 18.0 percent (± 9.3%) of residents had at least a bachelor's degree, while seven percent had a graduate degree or higher. The employment rate was 38.7 percent (± 13.1%), and 5.5 percent (± 5.7%) of the men were veterans. The town's median household income was $29,375 (± $15,623), as compared to the state's rate of $61,972 (± $541), which left 34.0 percent (± 16.6%) of locals living in poverty.

Located in the Eastern Time Zone and area code 252, Rich Square's ZIP Code is 27869.

== Government ==
In the 1960s, Rich Square was governed by a town council. Local funeral home director Joseph Gordon was the first African American elected to the body, in 1967.

== Education ==
In the 1950s, Rich Square had two high schools: Rich Square High School and W. S. Creecy High School. William Soencer Creecy was the principal of the school for African American children.

== Notable people ==
- Miles Darden – Alleged largest man in history (1799–1857)
- Robert F. Elliott – American US Army pilot (born 1917/1918)
- Florenza Moore Grant – American civil rights activist (1921–2001)
- George V. Holloman – American Army inventor (1902–1946)
- Charles Robert Jenkins – American Army defector (1940–2017)
- Stu Martin – American baseball player (1912–1997)
- Shelia P. Moses – American writer (born 1961)
- Manassa Thomas Pope – American physician and businessman (1858–1934)
- James Ransome – American illustrator (born 1961)
- Wesley Tann – African–American fashion designer (1928–2012)
