= Lenoir County, North Carolina =

County in North Carolina, United States

- County
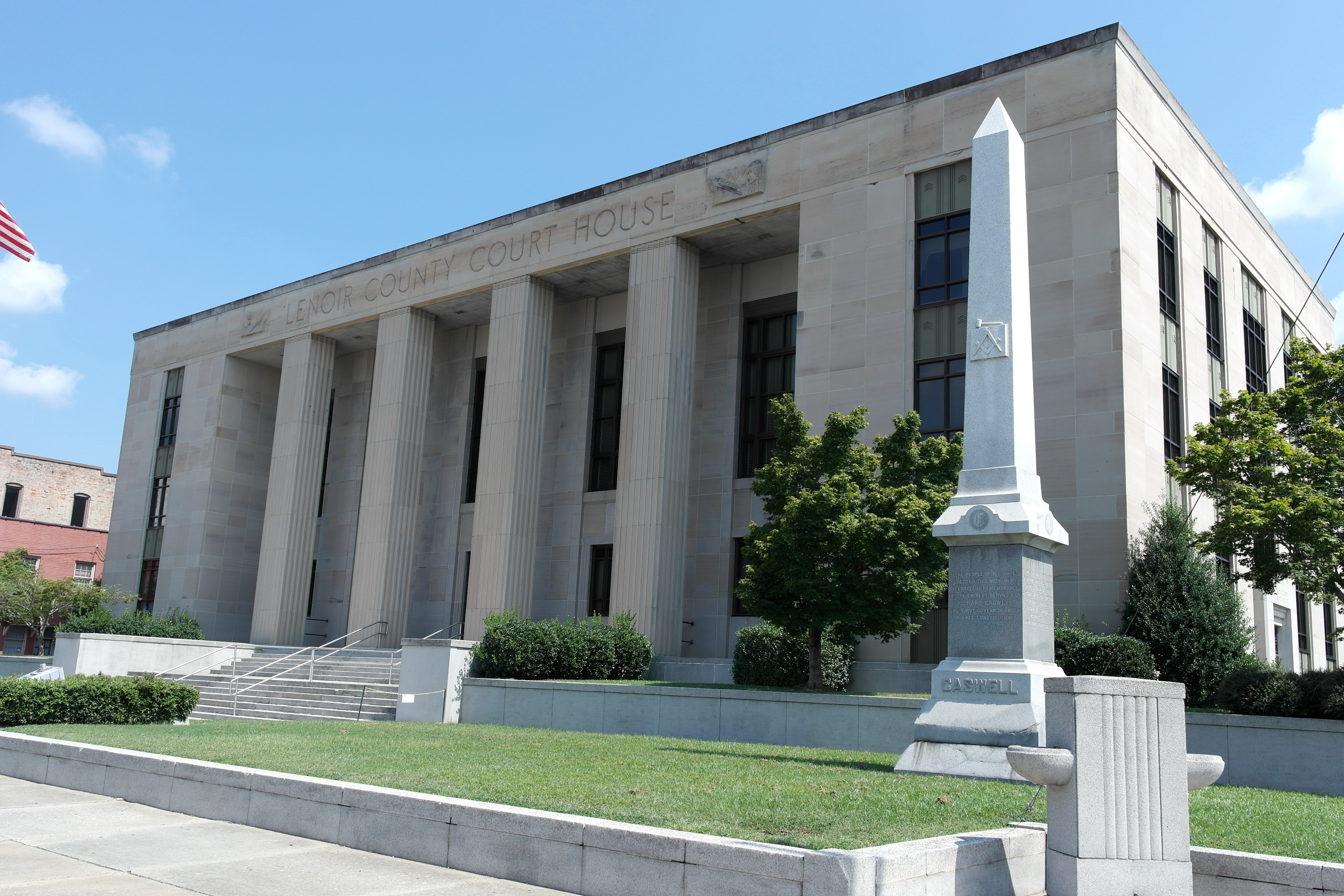
- Lenoir County Courthouse in Kinston

- Flag Seal Logo

- Location within the U.S. state of North Carolina
- Coordinates: 35.24°N 77.64°W
- Country: United States
- State: North Carolina
- Founded: 1791
- Named for: William Lenoir
- Seat: Kinston
- Largest community: Kinston

Area
  - Total: 401.37 sq mi (1,039.5 km^{2})
  - Land: 399.09 sq mi (1,033.6 km^{2})
  - Water: 2.28 sq mi (5.9 km^{2}) 0.57%

Population (2020)
  - Total: 55,122
  - Estimate (2025): 55,837 ▲
  - Density: 138.12/sq mi (53.33/km^{2})
- Time zone: UTC−5 (Eastern)
  - Summer (DST): UTC−4 (EDT)
- Congressional district: 1st
- Website: lenoircountync.gov

Lenoir County (/lɛˈnɔːr/ le-NOR) is a county in the U.S. state of North Carolina. As of the 2020 census, its population was 55,122. Its county seat is Kinston, located on the Neuse River, across which the county has its territory.

Lenoir County comprises the Kinston, NC Micropolitan Statistical Area.

== History ==
The county was formed in 1791 from the southern part of Dobbs County. It was named for William Lenoir (1751–1839), an officer in the American Revolutionary War who took part in the Battle of Kings Mountain. He was a prominent political leader; when the county was established, he was serving as Speaker of the North Carolina Senate.

== Geography ==
Interactive map of Lenoir County

According to the U.S. Census Bureau, the county has an area of 401.37 square miles (1,039.5 km^{2}), of which 399.09 square miles (1,033.6 km^{2}) is land and 2.28 square miles (5.9 km^{2}) (0.57%) is water.

=== State and local protected sites ===
- CSS Neuse
- Neuseway Nature Center and Planetarium

=== Major water bodies ===
- Contentnea Creek
- Neuse River
- Southwest Creek
- Wheat Swamp

=== Adjacent counties ===
- Greene County – north
- Pitt County – northeast
- Craven County – east
- Jones County – southeast
- Duplin County – southwest
- Wayne County – west

=== Major highways ===
- I-42 / Future I-42
- US 70
- US 258
- NC 11
- NC 55
- NC 58
- NC 118
- NC 148
- NC 241
- NC 903

=== Major infrastructure ===
- Amtrak Thruway (Kinston)
- Kinston Regional Jetport
- Global TransPark
- Greyhound Bus Terminal, with a location in Kinston

== Demographics ==
Historical population
| Census | Pop. | Note | %± |
|---|---|---|---|
| 1800 | 4,005 | | — |
| 1810 | 5,572 | | 39.1% |
| 1820 | 6,799 | | 22.0% |
| 1830 | 7,723 | | 13.6% |
| 1840 | 7,605 | | −1.5% |
| 1850 | 7,828 | | 2.9% |
| 1860 | 10,220 | | 30.6% |
| 1870 | 10,434 | | 2.1% |
| 1880 | 15,344 | | 47.1% |
| 1890 | 14,879 | | −3.0% |
| 1900 | 18,639 | | 25.3% |
| 1910 | 22,769 | | 22.2% |
| 1920 | 29,555 | | 29.8% |
| 1930 | 35,716 | | 20.8% |
| 1940 | 41,211 | | 15.4% |
| 1950 | 45,953 | | 11.5% |
| 1960 | 55,276 | | 20.3% |
| 1970 | 55,204 | | −0.1% |
| 1980 | 59,819 | | 8.4% |
| 1990 | 57,274 | | −4.3% |
| 2000 | 59,648 | | 4.1% |
| 2010 | 59,495 | | −0.3% |
| 2020 | 55,122 | | −7.4% |
| 2025 (est.) | 55,837 | ▲ | 1.3% |
U.S. Decennial Census; 1790–1960 1900–1990; 1990–2000 2010 2020

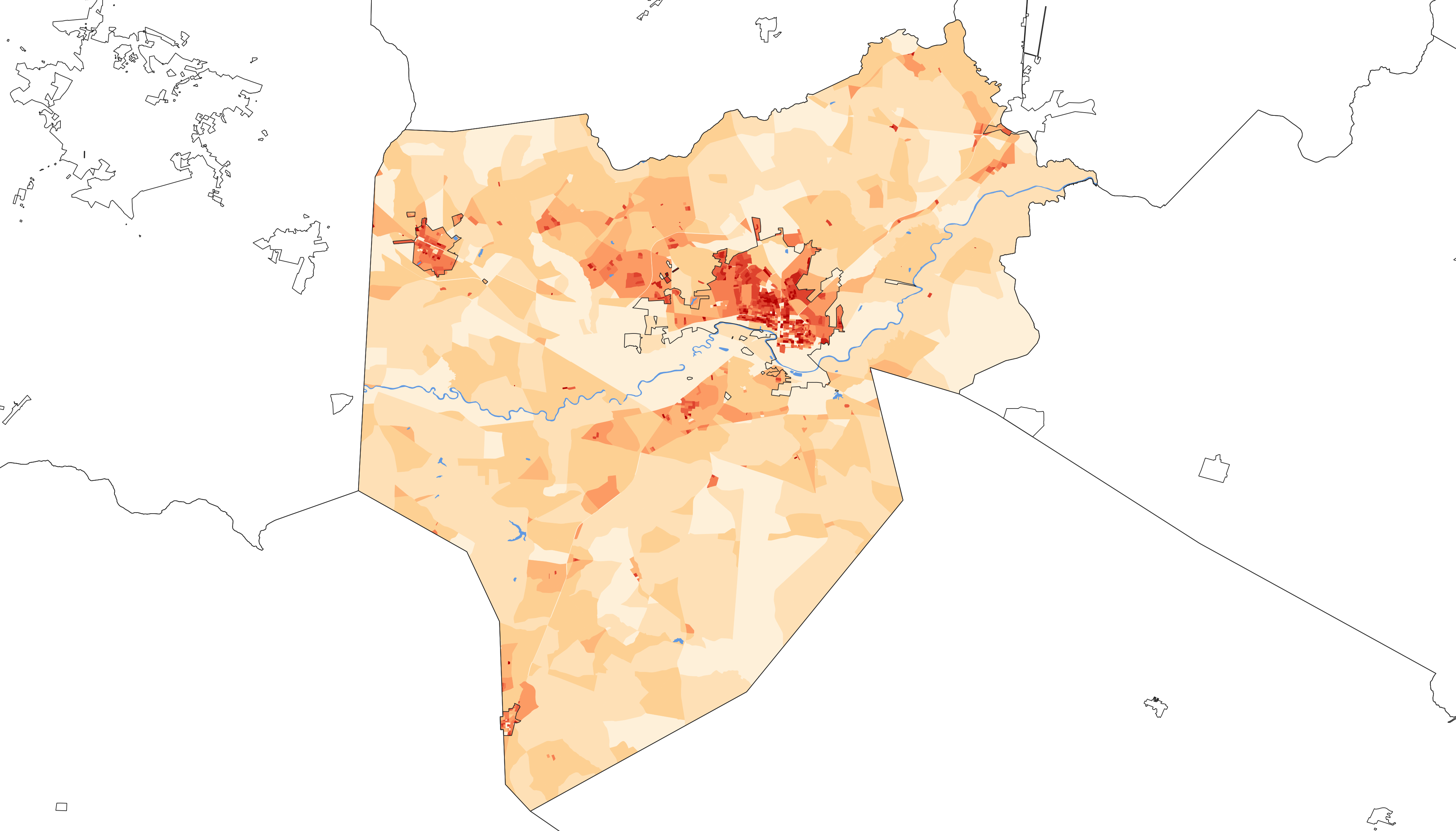
2020 population density of Lenoir County NC by census block

=== Racial and ethnic composition ===
Lenoir County, North Carolina – Racial and ethnic composition Note: the US Census treats Hispanic/Latino as an ethnic category. This table excludes Latinos from the racial categories and assigns them to a separate category. Hispanics/Latinos may be of any race.
| Race / Ethnicity (NH = Non-Hispanic) | Pop 1980 | Pop 1990 | Pop 2000 | Pop 2010 | Pop 2020 | % 1980 | % 1990 | % 2000 | % 2010 | % 2020 |
|---|---|---|---|---|---|---|---|---|---|---|
| White alone (NH) | 36,624 | 34,136 | 33,075 | 30,492 | 26,582 | 61.22% | 59.60% | 55.45% | 51.25% | 48.22% |
| Black or African American alone (NH) | 22,555 | 22,456 | 24,016 | 23,968 | 22,034 | 37.71% | 39.21% | 40.26% | 40.29% | 39.97% |
| Native American or Alaska Native alone (NH) | 56 | 69 | 97 | 163 | 134 | 0.09% | 0.12% | 0.16% | 0.27% | 0.24% |
| Asian alone (NH) | 92 | 142 | 199 | 256 | 332 | 0.15% | 0.25% | 0.33% | 0.43% | 0.60% |
| Native Hawaiian or Pacific Islander alone (NH) | x | x | 23 | 26 | 22 | x | x | 0.04% | 0.04% | 0.04% |
| Other race alone (NH) | 22 | 8 | 41 | 66 | 135 | 0.04% | 0.01% | 0.07% | 0.11% | 0.24% |
| Mixed race or Multiracial (NH) | x | x | 306 | 607 | 1,518 | x | x | 0.51% | 1.02% | 2.75% |
| Hispanic or Latino (any race) | 470 | 463 | 1,891 | 3,917 | 4,365 | 0.79% | 0.81% | 3.17% | 6.58% | 7.92% |
| Total | 59,819 | 57,274 | 59,648 | 59,495 | 55,122 | 100.00% | 100.00% | 100.00% | 100.00% | 100.00% |

=== 2020 census ===
As of the 2020 census, there were 55,122 people, 22,930 households, and 14,863 families residing in the county. The median age was 43.1 years, 22.1% of residents were under the age of 18, and 20.9% of residents were 65 years of age or older. For every 100 females there were 90.6 males, and for every 100 females age 18 and over there were 86.9 males age 18 and over.

The racial makeup of the county was 49.2% White, 40.3% Black or African American, 0.3% American Indian and Alaska Native, 0.6% Asian, 0.1% Native Hawaiian and Pacific Islander, 4.9% from some other race, and 4.7% from two or more races. Hispanic or Latino residents of any race comprised 7.9% of the population.

There were 22,930 households in the county, of which 28.1% had children under the age of 18 living in them. Of all households, 37.9% were married-couple households, 19.6% were households with a male householder and no spouse or partner present, and 36.4% were households with a female householder and no spouse or partner present. About 32.6% of all households were made up of individuals and 14.9% had someone living alone who was 65 years of age or older.

There were 26,577 housing units, of which 13.7% were vacant. Among occupied housing units, 60.1% were owner-occupied and 39.9% were renter-occupied. The homeowner vacancy rate was 1.6% and the rental vacancy rate was 6.8%.

38.2% of residents lived in urban areas, while 61.8% lived in rural areas.

=== 2010 census ===
At the 2010 census, there were 59,495 residents with 24,327 households and 15,993 families residing within the county. The population density was 149 people per square mile (58 people/km^{2}). There were 27,184 housing units at an average density of 68 units per square mile (26 units/km^{2}). The county's racial makeup was 56.47% White, 40.43% Black or African American, 0.18% Native American, 0.34% Asian, 0.05% Pacific Islander, 1.88% from other races, and 0.66% from two or more races. 3.17% of the population were Hispanic or Latino of any race.

There were 23,862 households, out of which 31.30% had children under the age of 18 living with them, 46.40% were married couples living together, 17.30% had a female householder with no husband present, and 32.20% were non-families. 28.40% of all households were made up of individuals, and 11.80% had someone living alone who was 65 years of age or older. The average household size was 2.43 and the average family size was 2.96.

In the county, the population was spread out, with 25.30% under the age of 18, 7.90% from 18 to 24, 27.60% from 25 to 44, 24.60% from 45 to 64, and 14.60% who were 65 years of age or older. The median age was 38 years. For every 100 females there were 90.30 males. For every 100 females age 18 and over, there were 84.70 males.

The median income for a household in the county was $31,191, and the median income for a family was $38,815. Males had a median income of $28,879 versus $21,536 for females. The per capita income for the county was $16,744. About 12.60% of families and 16.60% of the population were below the poverty line, including 22.00% of those under age 18 and 18.40% of those age 65 or over.

== Government and politics ==
United States presidential election results for Lenoir County, North Carolina
| Year | Republican | | Democratic | | Third party(ies) | |
| Year | No. | % | No. | % | No. | % |
|---|---|---|---|---|---|---|
| 1912 | 122 | 5.99% | 1,568 | 76.98% | 347 | 17.03% |
| 1916 | 667 | 28.57% | 1,666 | 71.35% | 2 | 0.09% |
| 1920 | 1,153 | 31.05% | 2,560 | 68.95% | 0 | 0.00% |
| 1924 | 514 | 18.83% | 2,191 | 80.26% | 25 | 0.92% |
| 1928 | 1,311 | 35.68% | 2,363 | 64.32% | 0 | 0.00% |
| 1932 | 350 | 6.93% | 4,677 | 92.60% | 24 | 0.48% |
| 1936 | 351 | 5.66% | 5,854 | 94.34% | 0 | 0.00% |
| 1940 | 440 | 6.58% | 6,247 | 93.42% | 0 | 0.00% |
| 1944 | 554 | 9.54% | 5,253 | 90.46% | 0 | 0.00% |
| 1948 | 515 | 8.37% | 5,445 | 88.54% | 190 | 3.09% |
| 1952 | 2,233 | 24.93% | 6,723 | 75.07% | 0 | 0.00% |
| 1956 | 2,564 | 27.24% | 6,847 | 72.76% | 0 | 0.00% |
| 1960 | 3,658 | 31.04% | 8,126 | 68.96% | 0 | 0.00% |
| 1964 | 5,617 | 42.44% | 7,617 | 57.56% | 0 | 0.00% |
| 1968 | 3,844 | 24.43% | 3,853 | 24.49% | 8,036 | 51.08% |
| 1972 | 11,065 | 73.89% | 3,672 | 24.52% | 238 | 1.59% |
| 1976 | 7,715 | 49.86% | 7,650 | 49.44% | 109 | 0.70% |
| 1980 | 9,832 | 55.50% | 7,546 | 42.60% | 336 | 1.90% |
| 1984 | 13,321 | 60.79% | 8,556 | 39.04% | 37 | 0.17% |
| 1988 | 10,669 | 58.13% | 7,649 | 41.68% | 35 | 0.19% |
| 1992 | 8,932 | 45.02% | 8,793 | 44.32% | 2,117 | 10.67% |
| 1996 | 9,433 | 49.84% | 8,635 | 45.63% | 857 | 4.53% |
| 2000 | 11,512 | 54.40% | 9,527 | 45.02% | 124 | 0.59% |
| 2004 | 12,939 | 55.82% | 10,207 | 44.04% | 33 | 0.14% |
| 2008 | 13,401 | 49.82% | 13,378 | 49.74% | 118 | 0.44% |
| 2012 | 13,980 | 49.78% | 13,948 | 49.66% | 158 | 0.56% |
| 2016 | 13,613 | 50.78% | 12,634 | 47.13% | 560 | 2.09% |
| 2020 | 14,590 | 51.36% | 13,605 | 47.89% | 214 | 0.75% |
| 2024 | 14,564 | 52.95% | 12,700 | 46.18% | 239 | 0.87% |

Throughout the first two-thirds of the twentieth century, Lenoir County was a typical overwhelmingly Democratic "Solid South" county. It was always carried by the Democratic presidential nominee between at least 1876 and 1964, following upon which "American Independent" candidate George Wallace obtained a majority of the county's vote in 1968 amidst large-scale opposition to racial desegregation and civil rights for African-Americans. In every election since, Lenoir County has voted for the Republican presidential nominee, although on several occasions the GOP margin has been extremely close and on only five occasions out of twelve has the margin been more than ten percentage points.

Lenoir County is a member of the Eastern Carolina Council of Governments.

Lenoir County is represented in the U.S. House of Representatives by Don Davis, who is the representative for North Carolina's 1st congressional district. The county is also in North Carolina's 3rd Senate district, represented by Bob Brinson, and North Carolina's 12th House district, represented by Chris Humphrey. The current Lenoir County Commissioners (as of 2024) are: Roland Best (D), June Cummings (D), J. Mac Daughety (R), Preston Harris (D), Keith King (R), Linda Rouse Sutton (D; chairman), and Eric Rouse (R; vice-chair). The current members of the Lenoir County Board of Education (as of 2024) are: W. D. Anderson (vice chair), Michelle Cash, Bruce Hill (chair), Merwyn K. Smith, Dr. Kimberly Outlaw-Starkey, Elijah Woods, and John Wiggins.

== Education ==
=== Higher Education ===
Lenoir County is home to one higher learning institution, Lenoir Community College – which is located at 231 NC HWY 58 South, Kinston and is part of the North Carolina Community College System. The college offers associate degrees, diplomas, or certificates for educational programs in college transfer, business, industry, public services, health sciences, and continuing education. Programs and support services are accessible through traditional and distance learning options.

=== Primary and Secondary Education ===
Public education in Lenoir County is administered and supported by the Lenoir County Public School Board, which formed from a merge of the City of Kinston and Lenoir County school systems in 1992. There are four public high schools in Lenoir County: Lenoir County Early College, North Lenoir, South Lenoir, and Kinston High School. Three public middle schools: E.B. Frink, Rochelle, and Woodington. There are also eight public elementary schools: Banks, La Grange, Moss Hill, Northeast, Northwest, Pink Hill, Southeast and Southwood. Additionally, Contentnea-Savannah is a K–8 school.

Lenoir County is also home to two private academies – Arendell Parrott Academy and Bethel Christian Academy – and two charter academies – Kinston Charter Academy and Children's Village Academy.

=== Libraries ===
Neuse Regional Library serves the residents of Lenoir, Greene, and Jones counties. With eight different locations, the library system offers services such as 3D printing and an inter-library loan system, as well as an eLibrary.

== Health ==
Lenoir County is home to UNC Lenoir Healthcare, a 199-bed non-profit hospital in Kinston.

== Communities ==
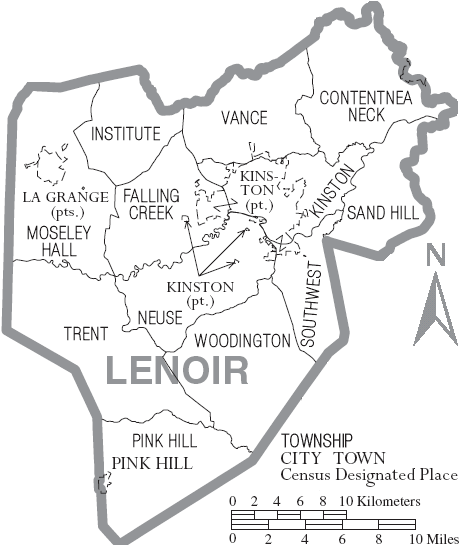
Map of Lenoir County with municipal and township labels

=== City ===
- Kinston (county seat and largest community)

=== Towns ===
- La Grange
- Pink Hill

=== Townships ===
- Contentnea Neck
- Falling Creek
- Institute
- Kinston
- Moseley Hall
- Neuse
- Pink Hill
- Sand Hill
- Southwest
- Trent
- Vance
- Woodington

=== Census-designated places ===
- Deep Run
- Graingers
- Jackson Heights

=== Unincorporated community ===
- Tick Bite

== Notable people ==
- Larry Beck, professional golfer
- Jocelyn Brown, R&B singer
- Reggie Bullock, NBA player
- Dwight Clark, San Francisco 49ers wide receiver
- Quinton Coples, NFL defensive end
- David Christopher Hatcher, MLB pitcher
- Malcolm Howard, Eastern District of North Carolina judge appointed by Ronald Reagan
- Vivian Howard, American chef
- Brandon Ingram, NBA player
- Frank Lucas, American mobster
- Susan Owens, seventh woman to serve on Washington Supreme Court
- Maceo Parker, saxophonist
- Melvin Parker, drummer
- Jamie Pressley, actor
- Frank Snepp, journalist
- Jerry Stackhouse, NBA player
- Donna Horton White, professional golfer

== See also ==
- List of counties in North Carolina
- National Register of Historic Places listings in Lenoir County, North Carolina
- Down East Wood Ducks, Minor League Baseball team that plays in Grainger Stadium
