= Aulander, North Carolina =

- Town
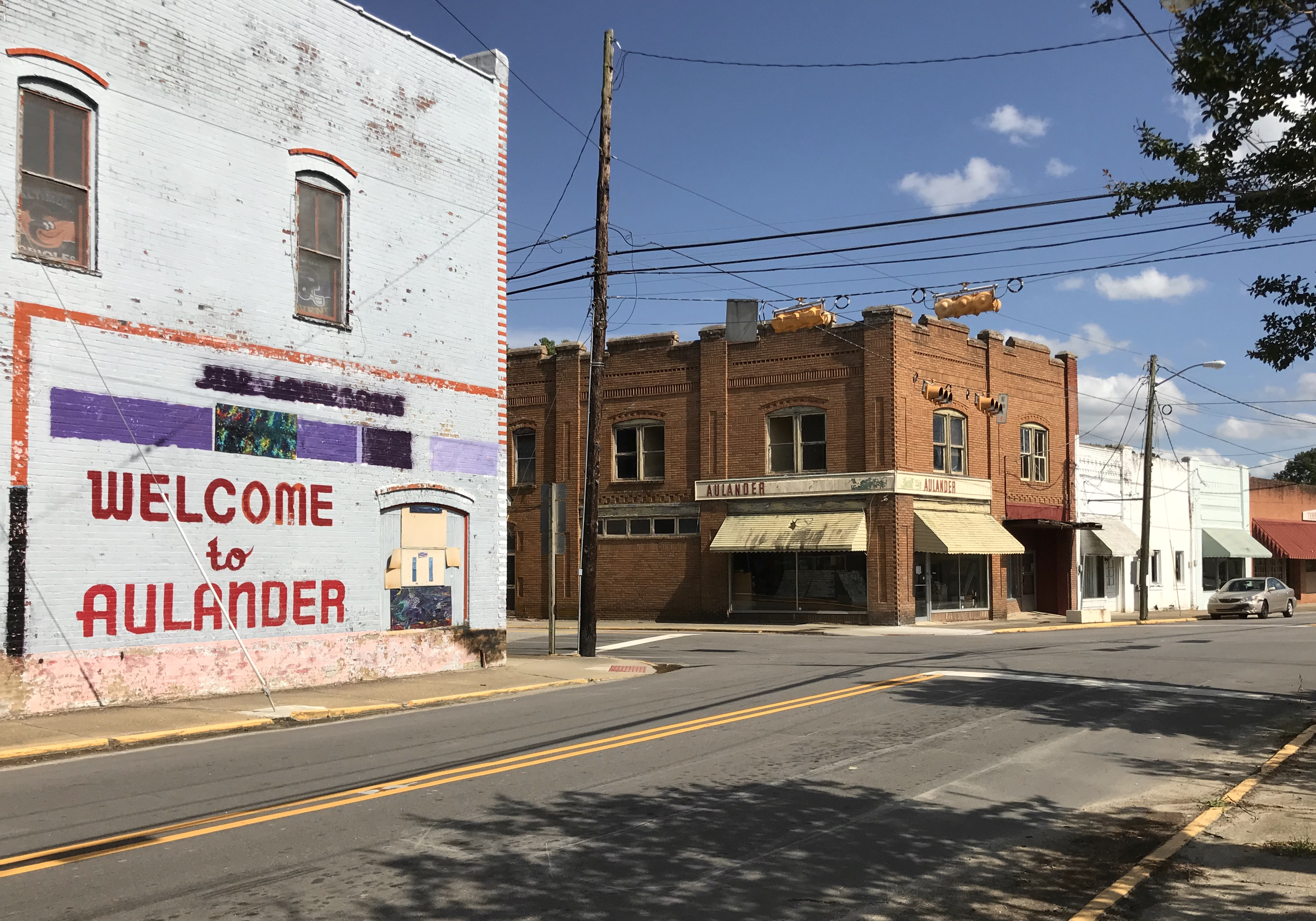
- Commerce Street

- Seal

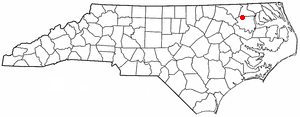
- Location of Aulander, North Carolina
- Coordinates: 36°13′41″N 77°06′49″W
- Country: United States
- State: North Carolina
- County: Bertie

Area
  - Total: 1.48 sq mi (3.83 km^{2})
  - Land: 1.48 sq mi (3.83 km^{2})
  - Water: 0 sq mi (0.00 km^{2})
- Elevation: 62 ft (19 m)

Population (2020)
  - Total: 763
  - Density: 516.5/sq mi (199.44/km^{2})
- Time zone: UTC-5 (Eastern (EST))
  - Summer (DST): UTC-4 (EDT)
- ZIP code: 27805
- Area code: 252
- FIPS code: 37-02580
- GNIS feature ID: 2405185

Aulander is a town in Bertie County, North Carolina, United States. The population was 763 at the 2020 census.

== Demographics ==
Historical population
Census	Pop.	Note	%±
1890	163		—
1900	342		109.8%
1910	543		58.8%
1920	803		47.9%
1930	1,041		29.6%
1940	1,057		1.5%
1950	1,112		5.2%
1960	1,083		−2.6%
1970	947		−12.6%
1980	1,214		28.2%
1990	1,209		−0.4%
2000	888		−26.6%
2010	895		0.8%
2020	763		−14.7%
U.S. Decennial Census

=== Racial and ethnic composition ===
Aulander town, North Carolina – Racial and ethnic composition Note: the US Census treats Hispanic/Latino as an ethnic category. This table excludes Latinos from the racial categories and assigns them to a separate category. Hispanics/Latinos may be of any race.
Race / Ethnicity (NH = Non-Hispanic)	Pop 2000	Pop 2010	Pop 2020	% 2000	% 2010	% 2020
White alone (NH)	507	386	331	57.09%	43.13%	43.38%
Black or African American alone (NH)	364	492	360	40.99%	54.97%	47.18%
Native American or Alaska Native alone (NH)	1	1	1	0.11%	0.11%	0.13%
Asian alone (NH)	2	1	2	0.23%	0.11%	0.26%
Native Hawaiian or Pacific Islander alone (NH)	0	0	0	0.00%	0.00%	0.00%
Other race alone (NH)	0	0	3	0.00%	0.00%	0.39%
Mixed race or Multiracial (NH)	3	10	36	0.34%	1.12%	4.72%
Hispanic or Latino (any race)	11	5	30	1.24%	0.56%	3.93%
Total	888	895	763	100.00%	100.00%	100.00%

=== 2020 census ===
As of the 2020 United States census, there were 763 people, 315 households, and 175 families residing in the town.

=== 2000 census ===
As of the census of 2000, there were 888 people, 371 households, and 247 families residing in the town. The population density was 601.4 inhabitants per square mile (232.2/km^{2}). There were 412 housing units at an average density of 279.0 per square mile (107.7/km^{2}). The racial makeup of the town was 57.09% White, 41.10% African American, 0.11% Native American, 0.23% Asian, 1.13% from other races, and 0.34% from two or more races. Hispanic or Latino of any race were 1.24% of the population.

There were 371 households, out of which 25.1% had children under the age of 18 living with them, 42.0% were married couples living together, 19.1% had a female householder with no husband present, and 33.4% were non-families. 29.1% of all households were made up of individuals, and 18.3% had someone living alone who was 65 years of age or older. The average household size was 2.39 and the average family size was 2.90.

In the town, the population was spread out, with 24.7% under the age of 18, 7.9% from 18 to 24, 24.3% from 25 to 44, 23.9% from 45 to 64, and 19.3% who were 65 years of age or older. The median age was 40 years. For every 100 females, there were 90.1 males. For every 100 females age 18 and over, there were 79.8 males.

The median income for a household in the town was $24,808, and the median income for a family was $34,125 . Males had a median income of $30,000 versus $21,528 for females. The per capita income for the town was $13,767. About 22.1% of families and 26.7% of the population were below the poverty line, including 43.1% of those under age 18 and 26.5% of those age 65 or over.
