= Deep Run =

Deep Run may refer to the following places in the United States:

== Alabama ==
- Deep Run (Godbolt Creek), a tributary of the Godbolt Creek in Baldwin County

== Illinois ==
- Deep Run (Ellison Creek), a tributary of the Ellison Creek in Henderson County

== Maryland ==
- Deep Run, Maryland, an unincorporated community in Carroll County
- Deep Run (Big Pipe Creek), a tributary of Big Pipe Creek in Carroll County
- Deep Run (Fifteenmile Creek), a tributary of Fifteenmile Creek in Allegany County
- Deep Run (Jones Falls), a tributary of Jones Falls in Baltimore County
- Deep Run (North Branch Patapsco River), at tributary of the North Branch Patapsco River in Carroll County
- Deep Run (Patapsco River), a tributary of the Patapsco River

== New Jersey ==
- Deep Run (Alloway Creek), a tributary of Alloway Creek in Salem County
- Deep Run (Great Egg Harbor River), a tributary of the Great Egg Harbor River in Atlantic County
- Deep Run (South River), a tributary of South River in Middlesex County
- Deep Run (Springers Brook), a tributary of Springers Brook in Burlington County

== New York ==
- Deep Run (Canandaigua Lake), a tributary of Canandaigua Lake in Ontario County

== North Carolina ==
- Deep Run, North Carolina, an unincorporated community in Lenoir County
- Deep Run (Broad Creek), a tributary of Broad Creek in Beaufort County
- Deep Run (Dawson Creek), a tributary of Dawson Creek in Pamlico County
- Deep Run (Upper Broad Creek), a tributary of Upper Broad Creek in Craven County

== Pennsylvania ==
- Deep Run (Tohickon Creek), a tributary of Tohickon Creek in Bucks County

== Virginia ==
- Deep Run Baptist Church, a historic church in Henrico County
- Deep Run Park, a public park in Henrico County
