= A Chef's Life =

American documentary-style cooking show

- Created by: Cynthia Hill, Vivian Howard
- Starring: Vivian Howard
- Country of origin: United States
- No. of episodes: 61

Production
- Running time: 28–30 minutes
- Production company: Markay Media

Original release
- Network: PBS
- Release: September 7, 2013 – October 22, 2018

A Chef's Life is an American documentary-style cooking show created by Cynthia Hill and Vivian Howard. The series was produced by Markay Media and was broadcast by PBS. The series premiered September 7, 2013, and its final episode, a series special called The Final Harvest, aired on October 22, 2018.

A Chef's Life was primarily filmed at the Chef & The Farmer restaurant in Kinston, North Carolina. Vivian Howard is head chef and her husband, Ben Knight, is general manager. They are also co-owners. Season 1 (2013) consisted of 13 half-hour episodes. Season 2 (2014) consisted of 14 half-hour episodes and an hour-long holiday special. Season 3 (2015) consisted of 13 half-hour episodes. Season 4 featured 10 episodes. Season 5 featured 10 episodes. The series finale, The Final Harvest, debuted in October 2018.

Both Cynthia Hill and Vivian Howard grew up in Lenoir County, North Carolina, Hill in Pink Hill and Howard in Deep Run. Vivian Howard and Cynthia Hill's younger sister were friends growing up. Both Hill and Howard left their small, rural communities and returned again years later, Vivian to open Chef & the Farmer, and Cynthia to focus on southern storytelling. Said Hill, "My films are all based on something I can see from my own backyard, issues and subjects that are near and dear to me."

The show won a Peabody Award on April 2, 2014 and a Daytime Emmy Award for Outstanding Culinary Program on April 26, 2018. The show was nominated for two other Daytime Emmys in 2018: Outstanding Culinary Host and Outstanding Directing. The show was also nominated for a Daytime Emmy in 2015 for Outstanding Single Camera Photography and was a 2014 James Beard broadcast award finalist.

Howard is working on a new show for PBS called South By Somewhere, which will consist of six, one-hour episodes. The show will premiere in 2020 and, according to Howard, will "continue to highlight Kinston and the South."

== Production ==
A Chef's Life was produced by Markay Media in association with South Carolina ETV. The series was directed and produced by Cynthia Hill with Rex Miller as director of photography and co-producer. Vivian Howard was writer and producer. Tom Vickers was editor. Amy Shumaker was executive-in-charge for SCETV. The series was a project of the Southern Documentary Fund. The show's theme song, Will You Return? was written and performed by North Carolina's Avett Brothers and is from their 2007 album Emotionalism.

As of 2015, the show was broadcast in 96% of the United States and each episode had 2.5 million viewers.

== Season 1 (2013) ==
The first season of A Chef's Life consisted of 13 episodes.

- Episode 1: (2013-9-10) "Sweet Corn And Expensive Tea"
- Episode 2: (2013-9-17) "Strawberry Stay At Home"
- Episode 3: (2013-9-24) "Pimp My Grits"
- Episode 4: (2013-10-01) "Cracklin' Kitchen"
- Episode 5: (2013-10-08) "You Say Heirloom, I Say Old Timey"
- Episode 6: (2013-10-15) "The World Is Your Oyster"
- Episode 7: (2013-10-22) "Muscadine Time"
- Episode 8: (2013-10-29) "A Road Trip For Rice"
- Episode 9: (2013-11-05) "Peanut Pastime"
- Episode 10: (2013-11-12) "Love Me Some Candied Yams!"
- Episode 11: (2013-11-19) "Collard Green Queen"
- Episode 12: (2013-11-26) "The Buttermilk Belt"
- Episode 13: (2013-12-03) "Have Yourself Some Moonshine"

== Season 2 (2014–2015) ==
The second season of "A Chef's Life consisted of 14 episodes and one hour-long holiday special.

- Episode 1: (2014-10-05) "Blueberries and Boiling Over"
- Episode 2: (2014-10-12) "Shrimp Sells"
- Episode 3: (2014-10-19) "R-E-S-P-E-C-T the Butterbean"
- Episode 4: (2014-10-26) "Don't Tom Thumb Your Nose at Me! Part 1"
- Episode 5: (2014-11-02) "Don't Tom Thumb Your Nose at Me! Part 2"
- Episode 6: (2014-11-09) "Apples"
- Episode 7: (2014-11-16) "The Fish Episode, Y'all"
- Episode 8: (2014-11-23) "Obviously, It's Pecans"
- Episode 9: (2014-11-30) "Turnips- The Roots"
- Episode 10: (2014-12-28) "Turnips- The Greens"
- Episode 11: (2015-01-04) "Chicken Lickin'"
- Episode 12: (2015-01-11) "Ramp-ing up to Spring"
- Episode 13: (2015-01-18) "Eggs, A Dozen Ways"
- Episode 14: (2015-01-25) "Eggs, Two Dozen Ways"
- Episode 15: (2014-12-16) "The Holiday Special"

== Season 3 (2015) ==
The third season of "A Chef's Life consisted of 13 episodes.

- Episode 1: (2015-09-01) "Stop, Squash and Roll"
- Episode 2: (2015-09-08) "Pretty in Peach"
- Episode 3: (2015-09-15) "Gettin' Figgy With It"
- Episode 4: (2015-09-22) "Pickle Perfect"
- Episode 5: (2015-09-29) "Prickly Business"
- Episode 6: (2015-10-06) "If You Can't Beet Em"
- Episode 7: (2015-10-13) "A Casserole Says Plenty"
- Episode 8: (2015-10-20) "Honey, I'm Home!"
- Episode 9: (2015-10-27) "They Call 'Em 'Bagas"
- Episode 10: (2015-11-03) "Gone Clamming, Part I"
- Episode 11: (2015-11-10) "Gone Clamming, Part II"
- Episode 12: (2015-11-17) "What's Your Beef?"
- Episode 13: (2015-11-24) "One Potato, New Potato"

== Season 4 (2016) ==
- Episode 1: (2016-09-10) "Onions and Avetts"
- Episode 2: (2016-09-17) "My Watermelon Baby"
- Episode 3: (2016-09-24) "Peas, Please"
- Episode 4: (2016-10-01) "Stand By Your Cabbage"
- Episode 5: (2016-10-08) "Cabbage's Last Stand"
- Episode 6: (2016-10-15) "Rabbit"
- Episode 7: (2016-10-22) "More Than One Way to Skin a Catfish"
- Episode 8: (2016-10-29) "All Sunchoked Up"
- Episode 9: (2016-11-05) "Heavenly Hocks"
- Episode 10: (2016-11-12) "Mayo -- The Mother Sauce"

== Season 5 (2017) ==
- Episode 1: (2017-10-05) "Two-mato"
- Episode 2: (2017-09-30) "Shake, Rattle, and Pole (Beans)"
- Episode 3: (2017-10-07) "Prolific Peppers"
- Episode 4: (2017-10-26) "A Food Truck and a Pear Tree"
- Episode 5: (2017-11-02) "WANTED: Broccoli"
- Episode 6: (2017-11-05) "Bourbon Country"
- Episode 7: (2017-11-16) "Persimmon Style"
- Episode 8: (2017-11-19) "Chasing Trout"
- Episode 9: (2017-11-30) "Liver Lover"
- Episode 10: (2017-12-07) "King Cornbread"

== Series Finale (2018) ==
- Special: (2018-10-22) "The Final Harvest"

== Reception ==
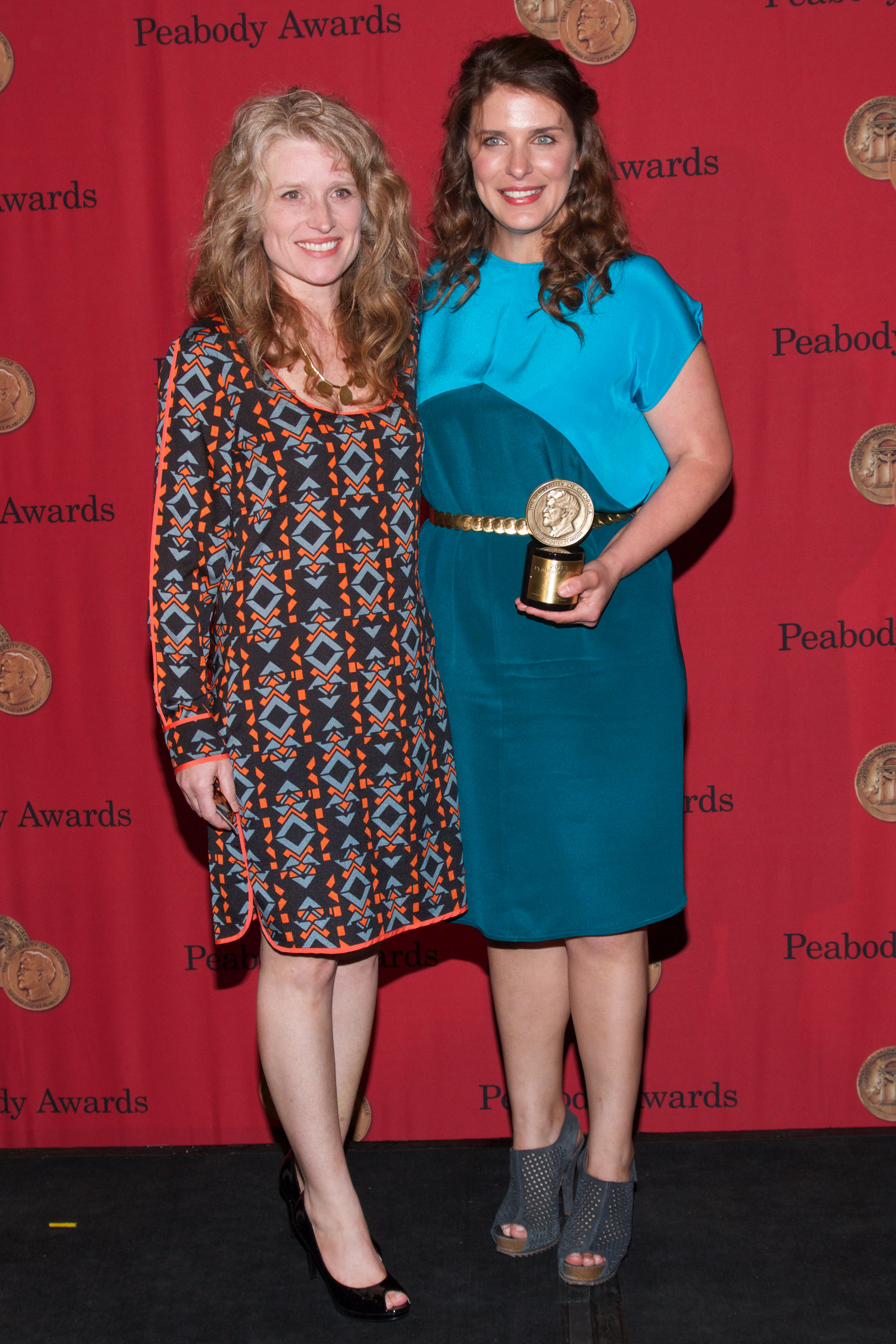
Cynthia Hill and Vivian Howard at the 73rd Annual Peabody Awards

Jill Warren Lucas from Indy Week praised the show. Corey Lowenstein of The News & Observer wrote, "Howard and Hill's partnership works because both women intuitively understand the food landscape they are trying to portray." It won a Peabody Award in 2013 "for its refreshingly unsensational depiction of life and work in a modern restaurant—with generous sides of Southern folkways and food lore." In 2018, A Chef's Life won the Daytime Emmy for Outstanding Culinary Program. "The whole point of A Chef's Life is to showcase the people and traditions of Eastern North Carolina, not some version of them gussied up for TV."

A 2018 Jezebel article titled "The Future of Food TV Is Female" parallels Samin Nosrat's Netflix show Salt Fat Acid Heat to Vivian Howard's PBS series A Chef's Life. Writer Megan Reynolds acknowledges the two shows' similarities by saying: "What differentiates Nosrat and Howard's shows from the men-hosted series is, of course, that they are women and are cleverly using their womanhood to subvert the expectations of what food television can and should be like. Traditionally, women on food TV are chained to a marble island in a large, well-appointed home, cooking a meal for their families in tightly-edited, half-hour bites. [...] Nosrat and Howard free themselves from the kitchen and go out into the world, just like the men would, but are kinder, more compassionate, and much more compelling."
