= Cynthia Hill =

Cynthia Hill may refer to:

- Cindy Hill (golfer) (born 1948), American professional golfer
- Cynthia Hill (director), American director and producer
