= Concordia Studio =

American film and TV production company

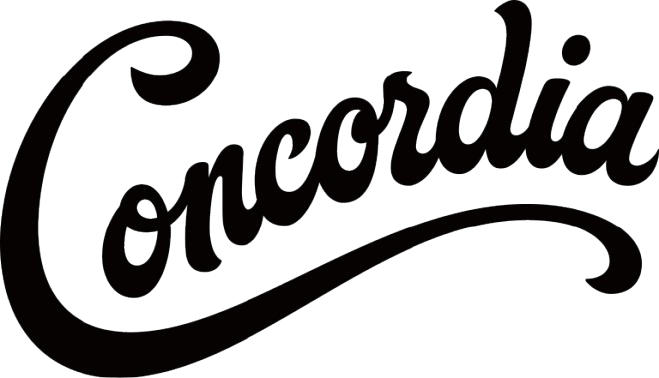
- Industry: Film industry
- Founder: Davis Guggenheim; Jonathan King
- Headquarters: Los Angeles, California, U.S.
- Area served: United States
- Website: concordia.studio

Concordia Studio is an American independent film production and television production company. The company has produced Boys State (2020), Time (2020), A Thousand Cuts (2020), Procession (2021), Swan Song (2021), Still: A Michael J. Fox Movie (2023), Rita (2024), and Deaf President Now! (2025).

== History ==
In January 2020, it was announced Davis Guggenheim and Jonathan King, had launched Concordia Studio in partnership with Laurene Powell-Jobs and Emerson Collective. The company will focus on developing, producing and financing scripted and non-scripted projects.

The company's first projects Boys State, Time, A Thousand Cuts, and Bloody Nose, Empty Pockets all premiered at the 2020 Sundance Film Festival. Boys State would be acquired by A24 and Apple TV+ for $12 million, and Time would go on to be nominated for the Academy Award for Best Documentary Feature.

In 2021, Concordia produced Summer of Soul directed by Questlove, which would go on to win the Academy Award for Best Documentary Feature, BAFTA Award for Best Documentary and Grammy Award for Best Music Film. That same year, Concordia produced its first narrative project Swan Song directed by Benjamin Cleary for Apple TV+.

In 2023, Concordia produced Still: A Michael J. Fox Movie directed by Guggenheim for Apple TV+, which was nominated for several Primetime Emmy Awards including the Primetime Emmy Award for Outstanding Documentary or Nonfiction Special, and Working: What We Do All Day for Netflix alongside Higher Ground Productions, directed by Caroline Suh.

In 2025, Concordia produced Deaf President Now! a documentary revolving around the 1988 student protests at Gallaudet University directed by Nyle DiMarco and Guggenheim for Apple TV+. That same year, they produced Last Take: Rust and the Story of Halyna, a documentary revolving around Halyna Hutchins, directed by Rachel Mason for Hulu.

== Fellowship ==
Concordia also offers a fellowship The Concordia Fellowship for documentary filmmakers, developing and receiving financial backing for projects either feature or episodic, and career advancement. Fellows include Cinque Northern, Tracy Jarrett, Giselle Bailey, Alice Gu, Shalini Kantayya, Christine Turner, Elizabeth Lo, Omar Mullick, Paula Eiselt, Cynthia Hill, Jon Kasbe, Joshua Altman, Garrett Bradley, Isabel Castro, Nadia Hallgren, and Bing Liu.

The fellowship has produced Burden of Proof for HBO, Mija for Disney+, and Under G-d for POV,
