= Burden of Proof (TV series) =

2023 American documentary miniseries

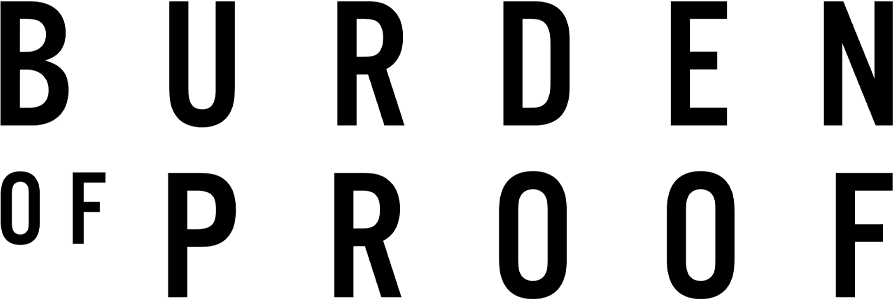
- Genre: Documentary
- Directed by: Cynthia Hill
- Music by: Chuck Johnson
- Country of origin: United States
- Original language: English
- No. of episodes: 4

Production
- Executive producers: Charlotte Cook; Davis Guggenheim; Rahdi Taylor; Nancy Abraham; Lisa Heller
- Producers: Cynthia Hill; Christine Delp; Andrea Weigl; Tina Nyguen
- Cinematography: Rex Miller; Blaire Johnson; Josh Woll
- Editor: Tom Vickers
- Running time: 52-60 minutes
- Production companies: HBO Documentary Films; Markay Media; Field of Vision; The Concordia Fellowship

Original release
- Network: HBO
- Release: June 6 – June 7, 2023

Burden of Proof is an American psychological thriller and true crime documentary miniseries directed and produced by Cynthia Hill. It follows Stephen Pandos as he begins a search for the truth about his sister Jennifer, who disappeared in 1987. It premiered June 6, 2023, on HBO.

== Premise ==
When 15-year-old Jennifer Lynn Pandos went missing from her bedroom in Williamsburg, Virginia in 1987, her parents told everyone she ran away.

Decades later, her brother Stephen begins to search for the truth. His investigation into the case threatens to destroy his family as he becomes strongly convinced that his parents are both implicated in the crime. As time passes, more threads unravel and new evidence comes to light, Stephen starts to question everything he has come to believe.

Burden of Proof features commentary from a wide cast of characters; the interviewees include Jennifer’s parents Ron and Margie Pandos, family members, high school friends, current and former investigators, among others.

== Episodes ==
No. in season	Title	Directed by	Original release date	U.S. viewers (millions)
1	"Episode One"	Cynthia Hill	June 6, 2023	N/A
In 1987, Ron and Margie Pandos awake to find their daughter Jennifer missing from her bedroom. Decades later, Jennifer’s older brother Stephen believes their parents are responsible for her disappearance and has the investigation re-opened.
2	"Episode Two"	Cynthia Hill	June 6, 2023	N/A
With the police focus on Ron and Margie, investigators scrutinize Ron’s past as a Vietnam veteran and his criminal record. Margie is offered immunity in exchange for testimony against Ron. After decades of estrangement, Stephen confronts his father. But when new information emerges, the investigation goes in an unexpected direction.
3	"Episode Three"	Cynthia Hill	June 7, 2023	N/A
A trove of Jennifer’s personal writings paints a picture of a struggling teenage girl. The re-appearance of lost evidence refocuses the investigation on an original person of interest. Stephen continues to believe his mother holds the key to the truth.
4	"Episode Four"	Cynthia Hill	June 7, 2023	N/A
As the police investigation heats back up, Stephen learns about secret legal proceedings and a police subpoena regarding someone from Jennifer’s past. New evidence takes an emotional toll on Stephen and his family.

== Production ==
Following the release of Private Violence, Stephen Pandos reached out to Cynthia Hill in 2015 seeking an avenue to tell the story of his sister's disappearance. Andrea Weigl, a former reporter for the Raleigh News & Observer, was brought on to help investigate the case, and track down those involved. The project was shot over the course of several years. Initially set to be a feature-length film, it was turned into a series upon investigators re-opening the case. Using re-creations, Hill wanted them to serve as a visual representation instead of being mistaken as truth.

In June 2018, it was announced Hill would direct, with HBO Documentary Films producing, and HBO distributing.

== Reception ==
Metacritic, which uses a weighted average, assigned a score of 74 out of 100 based on 5 critics, indicating "generally favorable reviews". RogerEbert.com gave the series three stars, describing director Cynthia Hill as an "excellent filmmaker" ... who avoids stepping into true crime pitfalls and "threads that needle just enough to make us feel as exhausted by the case as Stephen." Rolling Stone reviewed it favorably, stating "Burden of Proof is an exceptionally handsome documentary, from the crisp editing that often bursts into staccato sequences of images, to the painstakingly thorough reenactments, shot with the kind of painterly eye usually reserved for narrative features." In June 2023, CinemaBlend described it as "one of the best Max original shows to stream right now."
