= Lisa Coleman (academic) =

American academic administrator

Lisa M. Coleman
- Education: Denison University; Ohio State University; New York University
- Occupation: Academic administrator
- Title: President of Adler University

Lisa M. Coleman is an American academic administrator and the President of Adler University. Coleman is a well recognized leader in the field of higher education and is a National Academy of Public Administration Fellow. Coleman is also the recipient of numerous awards, and is featured in the 2025 film "Dear Ms.: A Revolution in Print" -- an HBO documentary film that explores the history and impact of Ms. Magazine, a groundbreaking feminist publication. The documentary, released in July 2025, uses archival footage, interviews, and analysis of iconic cover stories to examine the magazine's legacy, including its triumphs and missteps.

== Life ==
On September 1, 2024, Lisa M. Coleman, Ph.D., became the seventh president of Adler University. She is the first woman and person of African descent selected for the role. President Coleman served as New York University’s (NYU) inaugural senior vice president for global inclusion and strategic innovation and reported to President, Andrew D. Hamilton. She spearheaded initiatives that helped foster cultures of co-creation, inclusive leadership, and innovation grounded in research, student, faculty, and staff development, and alum collaborations. This work occurred across NYU’s expansive global network, including its flagship in Manhattan, two portal sites in Abu Dhabi and Shanghai, and numerous international sites and research centers. She also served on the faculty and taught courses focused on leadership at the NYU Abu Dhabi campus and in the NYU Leonard Stern School of Business.

At Harvard University, Coleman also served in an inaugural role as the special assistant to the president and its first chief diversity officer, where she reported to the first woman President of Harvard University, Drew Faust.. During her tenure, she and her team developed pioneering initiatives focused on technology and disability. Before her time at Harvard, she directed the Africana program at Tufts University and was later appointed as the first senior diversity officer reporting to, the President, Lawrence Bacow.

Coleman’s efforts to expand relationships and partnerships with alum, donors, corporations, and foundations have contributed to some expansive research and fundraising campaigns in higher education. Throughout her career, she has consistently demonstrated the capacity to launch global initiatives through this collaboration to secure funding and drive philanthropic and grant-cultivation efforts, and to expand fiscal support for health-related programs, faculty and student research, arts initiatives, and technology projects.

Coleman has amassed many achievements across higher education, health care, and industry, and she has also been recognized nationally and internationally for her work with governmental systems, for-profit, and nonprofit organizations. Her early professional and research experience includes working with the Association of American Medical Colleges and Merrill Lynch, as an independent computer and data analytics consultant, and as an international organizational strategic consultant. She, in collaboration with her teams, has led culture change across multiple institutions, resulting in new research areas including, but not limited to, artificial intelligence, biomedicine, and arts and technology initiatives. President Coleman’s most recent academic work has focused on global leadership, generational literacy, and emerging technology and innovations. She also serves on various boards and committees, including the United Negro College Fund-NY Leadership Committee, American Repertory Theater Advisory Board, ANA Educational Foundation, and Parity.Org.

Coleman is an interdisciplinarian who earned her doctorate in Social and Cultural Analysis, American Studies from NYU New York University, and her master’s degrees from the Ohio State University in African and African American Studies, Women’s, Gender, and Sexuality Studies, and Communication Studies are combined with additional certifications in Leadership and Intercultural Development Theory. She earned her bachelor’s degree in Sociology/Anthropology, focusing in Women’s Studies and Computer Science from Denison University; where she has also served on the board, and currently serves as a Trustee Fellow.
