= Kyle Larson vs. The Double =

2026 documentary film surrounding Kyle Larson's attempts to complete The Double

- Release cover
- Directed by: Cynthia Hill
- Produced by: Cynthia Hill; Sandra Davidson; Tom Vickers
- Starring: Kyle Larson; Rick Hendrick; Tony Kanaan
- Production companies: Imagine Entertainment; Everyone Else; Markay Media; NASCAR Studios; Hendrick Motorsports; Penske Entertainment
- Distributed by: Amazon Prime Video
- Release date: May 21, 2026
- Running time: 106 minutes
- Country: United States
- Language: English

Kyle Larson vs. The Double is a 2026 American sports documentary film produced in collaboration with NASCAR Studios and Amazon Prime Video. The film follows NASCAR Cup Series driver Kyle Larson and his attempts in 2024 and 2025 to complete The Double, a challenge that involves competing in the Indianapolis 500 and the Coca-Cola 600 on the same day.

== Background ==
The Double refers to the attempt to compete in the Indianapolis 500, an IndyCar Series race held at Indianapolis Motor Speedway, and the Coca-Cola 600, a NASCAR Cup Series race held at Charlotte Motor Speedway, on the exact same day. The combined scheduled distances of the events total 1,100 miles (1,770 km). Tony Stewart is so far the only driver to have completed the full distance, becoming in 2001, the first driver to finish both races on the same day.

Larson, the 2021 NASCAR Cup Series champion, first attempted the challenge in 2024 through a collaboration between Hendrick Motorsports and Arrow McLaren. He returned for a second attempt in 2025.

=== 2024 attempt ===
Larson made his Indianapolis 500 debut on May 26, 2024, qualifying fifth and finishing 18th. He was named the race's Rookie of the Year.

Rain delayed the Indianapolis 500 by approximately four hours. Larson was unable to take part in the Coca-Cola 600 before that race was shortened by further inclement weather. Reserve driver Justin Allgaier started the No. 5 Hendrick Motorsports Chevrolet and finished 13th.

Larson subsequently received a NASCAR playoff waiver allowing him to remain eligible for the 2024 Cup Series championship despite missing the race.

=== 2025 attempt ===
Larson attempted the challenge again on May 25, 2025. He qualified 19th for the Indianapolis 500 but crashed on lap 92, ending his race before the halfway point, finishing in 24th.

Larson then traveled to Charlotte Motor Speedway, where he started second in the Coca-Cola 600 and briefly led the race. He was involved in a multicar incident on lap 245 that damaged his car's right-rear suspension and ended his night. He would finish 37th.

Following the second attempt, Larson expressed doubts about the feasibility of completing both races under the existing schedule, citing the limited time available to travel between venues and prepare for the second event.

== Production and release ==
The documentary was directed by Cynthia Hill. Producers included Hill, Sandra Davidson and Tom Vickers. Jeff Gordon and Ron Howard served as executive producers.

Filming followed Larson's preparation and efforts across the 2024 and 2025 attempts.

The documentary premiered on Amazon Prime Video on May 21, 2026. It was also later listed on Apple TV.

== Cast ==
- Kyle Larson — himself
- Katelyn Larson — herself
- Rick Hendrick — himself
- Tony Kanaan — himself
- Tyler Monn — himself
