= Alice Gu =

American documentary filmmaker and cinematographer

- Born: Los Angeles, California, U.S.
- Occupations: Director, writer, cinematographer, producer
- Years active: 2009–present

Alice Gu is an American documentary filmmaker and cinematographer. She is known for directing and serving as cinematographer for projects such as The Donut King (2020), Really Good Rejects (2022) and Dear Ms.: A Revolution in Print.

== Career ==
Gu’s cinematography credits include Take Every Wave: The Life of Laird Hamilton (2017), directed by Rory Kennedy. She has collaborated with directors such as Werner Herzog and Stacy Peralta, contributing to various documentary films. In 2020, She directed her first feature documentary, The Donut King, which examines the life of Ted Ngoy, a Cambodian refugee who established a donut business in California. Inspired by a remark from her children’s nanny about “Cambodian donuts,” the film premiered at the South by Southwest. In 2022, she was selected as a Concordia Fellow.

Gu’s second documentary, Really Good Rejects (2022), premiered at South by Southwest in 2022. The film focuses on Los Angeles luthier Reuben Cox, who crafts custom guitars for musicians such as Jackson Browne, Carrie Brownstein, and Andrew Bird. In 2024, she directed and shot Shimmer, Inspired by Eva Young, a narrative short starring Harry Shum Jr. In 2025, she co-directed Dear Ms.: A Revolution in Print with Cecilia Aldarondo and Salima Koroma, a feature documentary exploring the history of Ms. magazine through its iconic covers, which premiered at the Tribeca Festival. She is currently directing The Elephant Odyssey, a feature documentary in production about the 2020 journey of Asian elephants across Yunnan, China, filmed with IMAX cameras.

== Select filmography ==
Year	Title	Contribution	Note
2017	Take Every Wave: The Life of Laird Hamilton	Cinematographer	Documentary
2019	Epiphany	Cinematographer	Feature film
2020	The Donut King	Director, writer, cinematographer and producer	Documentary
2021	As I Am	Director	Documentary series
2022	Really Good Rejects	Director, writer, cinematographer and producer	Documentary
2022	Walk with Obi	Director	Documentary short
2023	AKA Mr. Chow	Cinematographer	Documentary
2024	Shimmer, Inspired by Eva Young	Director and producer	Short film
2025	Dear Ms.: A Revolution in Print	Director and cinematographer	Documentary
TBA	The Elephant Odyssey	Director	Documentary

== Awards and nominations ==
Year	Result	Award	Category	Work	Ref.
2020	Won	Asian American International Film Festival	Emerging Director Award	The Donut King	
2020	Won	San Diego Asian Film Festival	Best Documentary Feature	The Donut King	
2020	Won	Bentonville Film Festival	Best Documentary	The Donut King	
2020	Nominated	Philadelphia Asian American Film Festival	Best Documentary	The Donut King	
2020	Won	South by Southwest	Special Jury Award	The Donut King	
2022	Nominated	South by Southwest	Audience Award	Really Good Rejects	
2024	Won	Bentonville Film Festival	Best Short Film	Shimmer, Inspired by Eva Young	
