= South Lenoir High School =

American public school in North Carolina

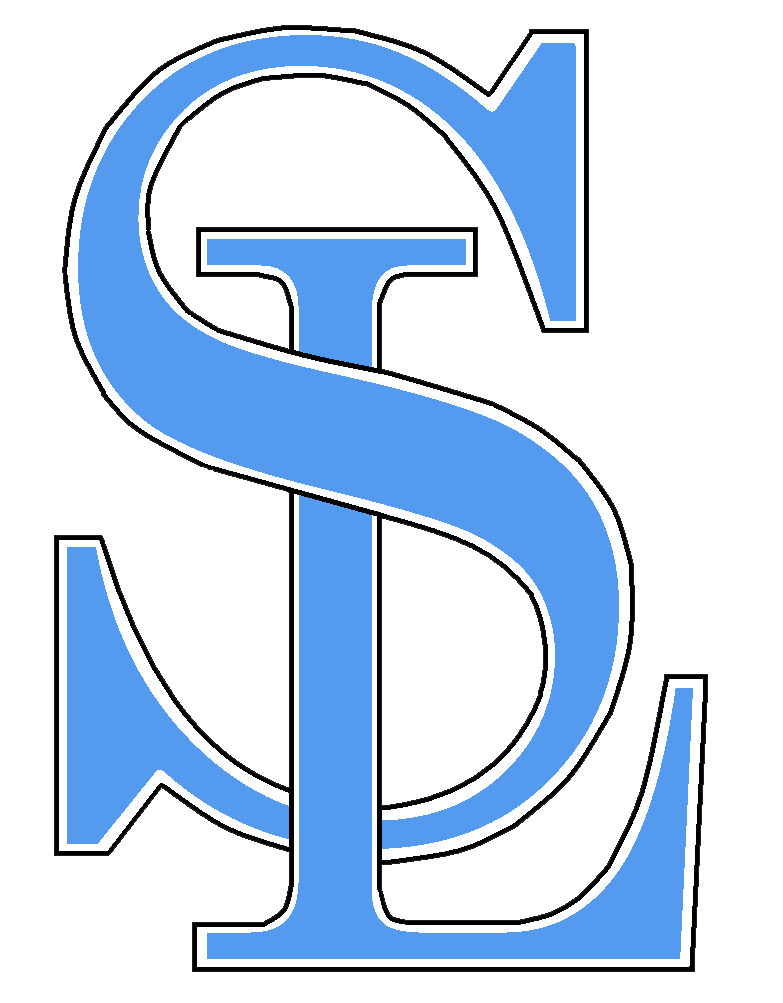

Location
- 3355 Old Highway 11; Deep Run, North Carolina 28525; United States
- Coordinates: 35°08′45″N 77°42′16″W

Information
- Type: Public
- Motto: Let's go big blue
- School district: Lenoir County Public Schools
- CEEB code: 340970
- Principal: Elizabeth P. Pierce (2020–present)
- Teaching staff: 47.50 (FTE)
- Grades: 9–12
- Enrollment: 771 (2022–23)
- Student to teacher ratio: 16.23
- Colors: Columbia blue and white
- Athletics: NCHSAA 2A
- Mascot: Rebel (1964–1970); Blue Devil (1970–present)
- Yearbook: Brimstone
- Website: slhs.lcpsnc.org

South Lenoir High School is located in Deep Run, North Carolina, USA. It is part of the Lenoir County Public School system. Its principal is Elizabeth P. Pierce.

== History ==
In 1926, the Deep Run School was built for grades 1–12. The spirit colors were red and white. The mascot was the state bird, the cardinal. In 1964, the county's schools consolidated and Deep Run closed and was reopened at South Lenoir for high school students in Lenoir County south of the Neuse River. The new school's nickname was the "Rebels" before changing to the "Blue Devils" after the integration of white and black students in 1970. In November 2014, California sibling band Echosmith performed at South Lenoir, and sang songs such as "Cool Kids."
