= Adler University =

Private university in US and Canada

- Type: Private university
- Established: 1952
- Founder: Rudolf Dreikurs
- President: Lisa M. Coleman
- Location: Chicago, Illinois, United States; Canada; 41.882383°N 87.629057°W^{a}
- Campus: Chicago Vancouver, BC, Canada
- Website: www.adler.edu
- ^{a} Coordinates of Chicago campus. The coordinates of the Vancouver campus are: 49.283828°N 123.113948°W

Adler University is a private university, with two campuses in North America. The university's flagship campus is in Chicago, Illinois, and its satellite campus is located in Vancouver, British Columbia. The university also offers online classes and degree programs online for both masters and doctoral students.

== History ==
Adler University is named for Alfred Adler (1870–1937), a physician, psychotherapist, and founder of Adlerian psychology, which is sometimes called individual psychology. He is considered the first community psychologist, because his work pioneered attention to community life, prevention, and population health.

Among Adler's advocates and followers was Adler University founder Rudolf Dreikurs (1897–1972), a psychiatrist who immigrated to Chicago in 1937 after Adler's death. Dreikurs lived and worked in Chicago's Hull House, and he was instrumental in the child guidance movement in the U.S.

In 1952, Dreikurs founded the Institute of Adlerian Psychology that, in 1954, changed its name to the Alfred Adler Institute of Chicago, and in 1991 became known as the Adler School of Professional Psychology, and in 2015 as Adler University. Early instructors and founders of the institute were also Bernard Shulman, Harold Mosak, Bina Rosenberg, and Robert Powers.

In 1963, the institute was chartered as a not-for-profit Illinois corporation and approved as a post-secondary educational provider. A year later, the institute created a group therapy program for those incarcerated at Cook County Jail, a program that was a precursor to the school's later focus on the incarcerated and the formerly incarcerated. In 1972, the institute established its on-campus Dreikurs Psychological Services Center, a community mental health center and training site for students, which was the precursor to today's Adler Community Health Services (ACHS), directed by Dan Barnes. In 1973, the Illinois Office of Education granted the institute the authority to award the Master of Arts in Counseling Psychology. The institute received accreditation of masters level programs and awarded its first M.A. degrees in 1978. It received doctoral level accreditation in 1987, and awarded its first Psy.D. degrees in 1990. The Psy.D. program was accredited by the American Psychological Association in 1998. (This accreditation has been maintained, but is limited to the Chicago campus.)

== Academics ==
Master and doctoral programs are offered at both the Chicago and Vancouver campuses. In fall 2013, the Vancouver campus began offering a Psy.D. in Clinical Psychology—the first traditional Psy.D. program in Canada.

Adler University's Chicago campus is accredited by the Higher Learning Commission and the American Psychological Association. All of Adler University's masters and doctoral programs offered at the Vancouver campus are offered under the written consent of the British Columbia Ministry of Advanced Education. Doctoral programs at the university's Vancouver campus are not accredited by the Canadian Psychological Association.

== Campuses ==
The university's main campus is located downtown Chicago.

Adler University also maintains a satellite campus in Vancouver, British Columbia and has been in Canada since the early 1970s as a clinical training base and an official campus since 2005. The Vancouver campus focuses on Graduate Studies and was located at 1090 West Georgia Street from 2007 to 2017. Since 2017, it has been located at 520 Seymour Street.

== Community partnerships ==
Annually, Adler University students provide over 650,000 hours of community service. Adler University partners with more than 700 agencies to advance community health. Adler Community Health Services (ACHS) provides psychological services to under-served populations through its clinical training programs.

ACHS training programs include the Adler Community Mental Health Doctoral Internship in Clinical Psychology as well as psychotherapy and diagnostic assessment externships, also known as clinical practica. The pre-doctoral internship at ACHS is accredited by the American Psychological Association (APA) and is a member of the Association of Psychology Post-doctoral and Internship Centers (APPIC).

A distinctive feature of Adler's programs, the Community Service Practicum (CSP) is a requirement for all first-year students at the School. The CSP is unique non-clinical experience, meant to expose future practitioners to concepts of social justice and social change, and to instill in them the ethos and the skill set necessary to engage in socially responsible practice.

=== Presidents ===
- Raymond E. Crossman 2003–2024
- Lisa Coleman 2024–current

== See also ==
- Classical Adlerian psychology
- North American Society of Adlerian Psychology
