= Dear Ms.: A Revolution in Print =

2025 American documentary film

Dear Ms: A Revolution in Print
- Directed by: Salima Koroma; Alice Gu; Cecilia Aldarondo
- Produced by: William Ventura
- Cinematography: Alice Gu; Maria Rusche
- Edited by: Jessica Miller; Carol Martori; Terra Jean Long
- Music by: Sajjad Hossain; Wynne Ashley Bennett; Angélica Negrón
- Production companies: HBO Documentary Films; McGee Media
- Distributed by: HBO
- Release dates: June 10, 2025 (Tribeca); July 2, 2025
- Running time: 111 minutes
- Country: United States
- Language: English

Dear Ms.: A Revolution in Print is a 2025 documentary film, directed by Alice Gu, Cecilia Aldarondo, and Salima Koroma. It explores the history of Ms. magazine.

It had its world premiere at Tribeca Festival on June 10, 2025, and was released on July 2, 2025, by HBO.

== Premise ==
Explores the history of Ms. magazine. Gloria Steinem, Letty Cottin Pogrebin, Pat Carbine, Suzanne Braun Levine, Jane O'Reilly, Marcia Ann Gillespie, Michelle Wallace, Lisa Coleman, Lindsy Van Gelder, Alan Alda, Robin Morgan, Ellen Sweet, Annie Sprinkle, Veronica Vera, Robin Leonardi, and Carole S. Vance are interviewed in the film.

== Release ==
The film had its world premiere at Tribeca Festival on June 10, 2025. It was released on July 2, 2025.

== Reception ==
On the review aggregator website Rotten Tomatoes, 94% of 16 critics' reviews are positive.

Elizabeth Weitzman of TheWrap wrote: "A fascinating, complex story that needs to be told." Christopher Llewyn Reed of Film Festival Today, who gave the film 4 out of 5 stars, wrote: "A very well-balanced documentary determined to tell the story in all its highs and lows. That objective approach is itself noteworthy."
