= The Donut King =

2020 American documentary film

- Film poster
- Directed by: Alice Gu
- Written by: Carol Martori
- Produced by: Farhad Amid; Tom Moran; José I. Nuñez; Alice Gu
- Cinematography: Alice Gu
- Edited by: Carol Martori; Rommel Mendoza
- Music by: Peter Lauridsen
- Release date: August 24, 2020 (SXSW)
- Country: United States
- Language: English

The Donut King is a 2020 American documentary film which tells the life story of California donut shop owner Ted Ngoy.

== Development ==
The Donut King was directed by Alice Gu, and is her first feature film. Having grown up in Los Angeles, she was doubtful when her children's nanny made a reference to "Cambodian" donuts; she thought all donuts were simply "American". Upon looking into the matter, she learned about Ted Ngoy and became fascinated with the topic. She reached out to Ngoy and other Cambodian families who ran donut shops, and within six weeks began principal photography.

== Production ==
Ngoy was hesitant to return to California for the film; he was estranged from his children and former friends. Gu persuaded him to and, ultimately, he regarded his return as a 'healing experience,' and his ex-wife and children have forgiven him.

== Release ==
The Donut King had its world premiere in the Documentary Feature Competition the South by Southwest film festival.

== Reception ==
=== Critical response ===
The film received 69/100 on Metacritic, receiving "generally favorable" reviews. In a positive review, Richard Whittaker with The Austin Chronicle said that "Gu does stellar work compiling and constructing Ngoy's life story through interviews and archive and contemporary footage," and added "the animation sequences by Chapeau Studios and 1881 Animation that make the perfect drizzle of icing." Giving it three-out-of-four stars, Nick Allen of RogerEbert.com called The Donut King "a heartwarming albeit scattered documentary from director Alice Gu," and praised the film for "its balance of poppy visuals and detailed history." In a mixed review, Brad Wheeler of The Globe and Mail said the film is "well worth watching" while saying there "are holes in this doughnut story."

== Impact ==
Whittaker said that "as Asian Americans face increasing racism, its closing message about how immigrant communities...define America has only become more timely."
