= Deep Run (Great Egg Harbor River tributary) =

Location
- Country: United States
- State: New Jersey
- County: Atlantic

Physical characteristics
- Source
  - location: Atlantic County, New Jersey, United States
  - coordinates: 39°30′42″N 74°55′12″W
- Mouth
  - location: Atlantic County, New Jersey, United States
  - coordinates: 39°30′26″N 74°46′43″W
  - elevation: 23 ft (7.0 m)

National Wild and Scenic Rivers System
- Designated: October 27, 1992

Deep Run (Earth)
Deep Run (the United States)
Deep Run (New Jersey)

Deep run is a tributary of the Great Egg Harbor River in Atlantic County, New Jersey, in the United States.
