= Deep Run (Canandaigua Lake) =

Location
- Country: United States
- State: New York
- County: Ontario County

Physical characteristics
- Source
  - location: Ontario County, New York, United States
  - coordinates: 42°48′8″N 77°12′41″W
- Mouth
  - location: Ontario County, New York, United States
  - coordinates: 42°49′15″N 77°15′36″W
  - elevation: 689 ft (210 m)

Deep Run (Earth)
Deep Run (the United States)
Deep Run (New York)

Deep Run is a tributary of the Canandaigua Lake in Ontario County, New York in the United States.
