= Deep Run (Broad Creek tributary) =

- Deep Run (the United States) Deep Run (North Carolina)

Location
- Country: United States
- State: North Carolina
- County: Beaufort County

Physical characteristics
- Source
  - location: Beaufort County, North Carolina, United States
  - coordinates: 35°32′8″N 76°42′40″W
- Mouth
  - location: Beaufort County, North Carolina, United States
  - coordinates: 35°33′0″N 76°41′21″W
  - elevation: 0 ft (0 m)

Deep Run is a tributary of Broad Creek in Beaufort County, North Carolina in the United States.
