= Cynthia Hill (director) =

American director and producer

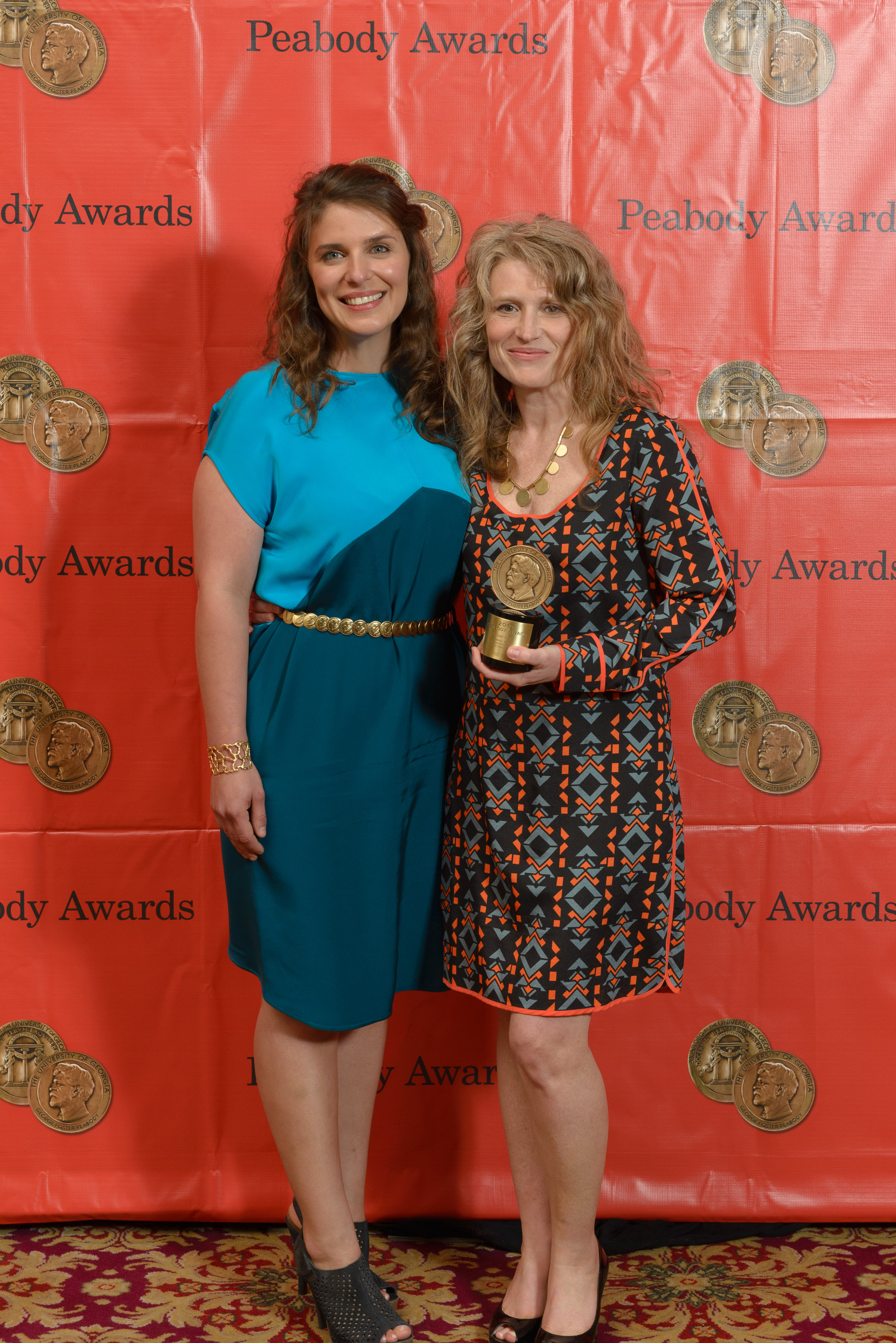
Vivian Howard (left) and Cynthia Hill (right) at the 73rd Annual Peabody Awards

Cynthia Hill is an American director and producer. She is most famous for creating, directing, and producing the television show A Chef's Life (2013–2018), as well as the documentary films Kyle Larson vs. The Double (2026), Private Violence (2014), “The Guestworker” (2006), and “Tobacco Money Feeds My Family” (2003).

Her production company is Markay Media, based in Durham, North Carolina.

== Early life ==
Cynthia Hill grew up in Pink Hill, North Carolina, a largely agricultural community. Many of her family members were tobacco farmers. Cynthia was raised Pentecostal, and attended the Pentecostal Holiness Church in Pink Hill. Much of her film career has primarily focused on stories from the rural South, and Eastern North Carolina specifically.

Hill attended the University of North Carolina at Chapel Hill where she studied to be pharmacist. While at UNC-CH, she met a production crew filming an episode of an accident reconstruction show in Chapel Hill. She soon become interested in film, making her first film for a class project about diabetes. Bill Campbell, the Dean of UNC's Pharmacy School, encouraged her to attend a Pharmacy Administration graduate program at Auburn University, which had access to video equipment. She attended Auburn for 18 months but did not finish her degree.

== Film career ==
After briefly living in Los Angeles, Hill moved to New York, working for four years as an editor at GLC productions. She then moved to Durham, North Carolina.

In 2002, she co-founded the Southern Documentary Fund with Steven Channing. The SDF currently fiscally sponsors over 50 independent documentaries.

In 2003, Hill co-produced February One, a documentary about the Greensboro, North Carolina lunch sit-ins during the 1960s. The film aired nationally in 2005 on PBS's Independent Lens.

Her feature directing debut came with “Tobacco Money Feeds My Family,” a documentary exploring the decline of the tobacco industry's effect on small town farmers and their communities. PBS broadcast the film nationally in 2006.

In 2006, she and Charlie Thompson, professor at the Center for Documentary Studies at Duke University, collaborated to make the film “The Guestworker” about migrant farmworkers in North Carolina. The film was featured at the Full Frame Documentary Film Festival and was broadcast on PBS.

Hill then began working on directing and producing her first serial television series, A Chef's Life. Hill knew Chef Vivian Howard of the restaurant Chef & the Farmer in Kinston, North Carolina, from growing up together in Eastern North Carolina. Hill's sister and Howard were friends. Howard and Hill collaborated to create a documentary-style cooking show about Vivian's journey to make a modern, upscale restaurant successful using Southern ingredients and Southern food traditions. Each episode of the show focuses on a different ingredient. Said Hill, “Vivian and I grew up together in rural eastern North Carolina, and we created A Chef's Life to focus on food traditions in our hometowns and her farm-to-table restaurant in Kinston, N.C. A lot of it is about her relationship to the local purveyors of the ingredients she uses, so again, the viewer glimpses a world that not many people are privy to, or even think about.” A Chef's Life aired nationally on PBS from 2013-2018, including five seasons and two specials.

In 2014, Hill produced and directed Private Violence, a film following the story of two domestic abuse survivors, Deanna Walters and Kit Gruelle. The film was created concurrently with “Survivor to Survivor,” a web-based media project Hill completed in 2011 as a resource for victims of domestic violence. Private Violence premiered at Sundance Film Festival in 2014. HBO Films and Women Make Movies acquired the rights to distribute the film.

In 2017 - Hill's company produced a behind the scenes look at a successful NASCAR family, Hendrick Motorsports. The series is called "Road To Race Day." Road to Race Day (executive produced by Peter Berg) premiered on Sony's Crackle in July 2020 and debuted on Verizon's go90 in 2017.

In 2020, Hill produced and directed "Somewhere South", another PBS series starring North Carolina chef Vivian Howard. Each episode of “Somewhere South” explored the connectivity of a single dish, and the ways people of different backgrounds interpret that dish while expressing the complex values, identities, and histories that make up the American South.

In 2021, Hill directed a two-part documentary about actor Brittany Murphy. "What Happened, Brittany Murphy?" aired on HBO Max in October 2021.

In 2022, Hill directed the Future of Transportation, a short film about Amazon's race to electrify its delivery fleet with the American electric vehicle manufacturer Rivian. The film is a part of Future Forward, a character-driven documentary series featuring Climate Pledge signatories that are pioneering industry innovation on the front lines of climate change.

In 2023, Hill directed Burden of Proof, an psychological thriller and true crime documentary miniseries for HBO. Filmed over the course of seven years, the series follows Stephen Pandos as he begins a search for the truth about his sister Jennifer, who disappeared at the age of 15 in 1987.

In addition to filmmaking, Hill also lectures at the Continuing Education program at the Center for Documentary Studies at Duke University.

== Filmography ==
As director:

- Tobacco Money Feeds My Family 2005
- The Guestworker 2006
- A Chef's Life 2013
- Private Violence 2014
- Somewhere South 2020
- What Happened, Brittany Murphy? 2021
- Burden of Proof 2023
- Kyle Larson vs. The Double 2026

== Awards ==
A Chef's Life received a Peabody Award in 2014. Hill also won a 2015 Daytime Emmy for Outstanding Directing in a Lifestyle/Culinary/Travel Program for the series.

Private Violence won the Candescent Award at Sundance Film Festival in 2014. It also won the Kathleen Bryan Edwards Award for Human Rights at the 2014 Full Frame Documentary Film Festival, and the Silver Heart Award at the 2014 Dallas International Film Festival. The film was nominated for a 2015 Primetime Emmy Award in the Outstanding Informational Programming – Long Form Category.

== Personal life ==
Hill is the mother of two daughters, Sadie and Ruby. They currently reside in Durham, North Carolina.
