= Deep Run (Big Pipe Creek tributary) =

- Deep Run (the United States) Deep Run (Maryland)

Location
- Country: United States
- State: Maryland
- County: Carroll County

Physical characteristics
- Source
  - location: Carroll County, Maryland, United States
  - coordinates: 39°41′57″N 76°56′42″W
- Mouth
  - location: Carroll County, Maryland, United States
  - coordinates: 39°40′5″N 77°0′44″W
  - elevation: 545 ft (166 m)

Deep Run is a tributary of Big Pipe Creek in Carroll County, Maryland in the United States.
