= Deep Run Baptist Church =

Church in Henrico County, Virginia, US

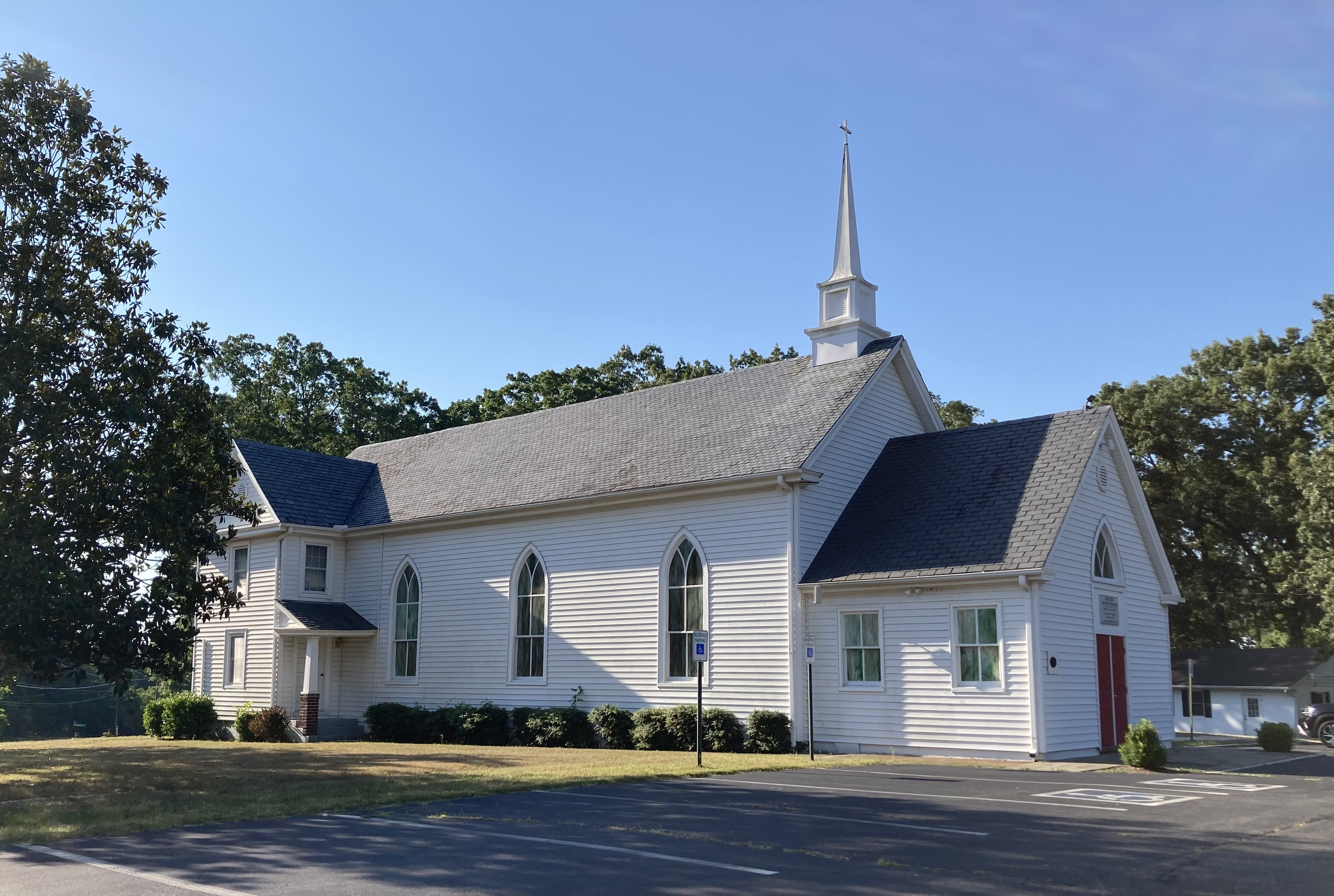
- Deep Run Baptist Church photographed in 2024.
- Deep Run Baptist Church
- 37.638127°N 77.585867°W
- Location: Henrico County, Virginia, United States
- Country: US
- Denomination: Baptist
- Previous denomination: Anglican
- Website: www.deeprun.org

History
- Former name: Hungry Church
- Founded: October 2, 1742

Administration
- Division: Dover Baptist Association

Clergy
- Pastor: Rick Allison

Deep Run Baptist Church is a Baptist church located in western Henrico County, Virginia.

== History ==
Constructed and established as an Anglican chapel in 1742, the church was originally named "Hungry Church".

In 1791 the church changed denominations, and merged with Chickahominy Baptist Church (which had been founded by Rev. Reuben P. Ford of the Goochland Baptist Church) to become Hungry Baptist Church. Both churches were part of the Dover Baptist Association, with Rev. Ford serving as clerk for 3 decades and struggling for separation of church and state. In 1819, the name was changed again to Deep Run Baptist Church. During the American Revolutionary War, the church served as a hospital for wounded soldiers and was used by the Marquis de Lafayette as a meeting place.
