= Vivian Howard =

American chef, restaurateur, author and television host

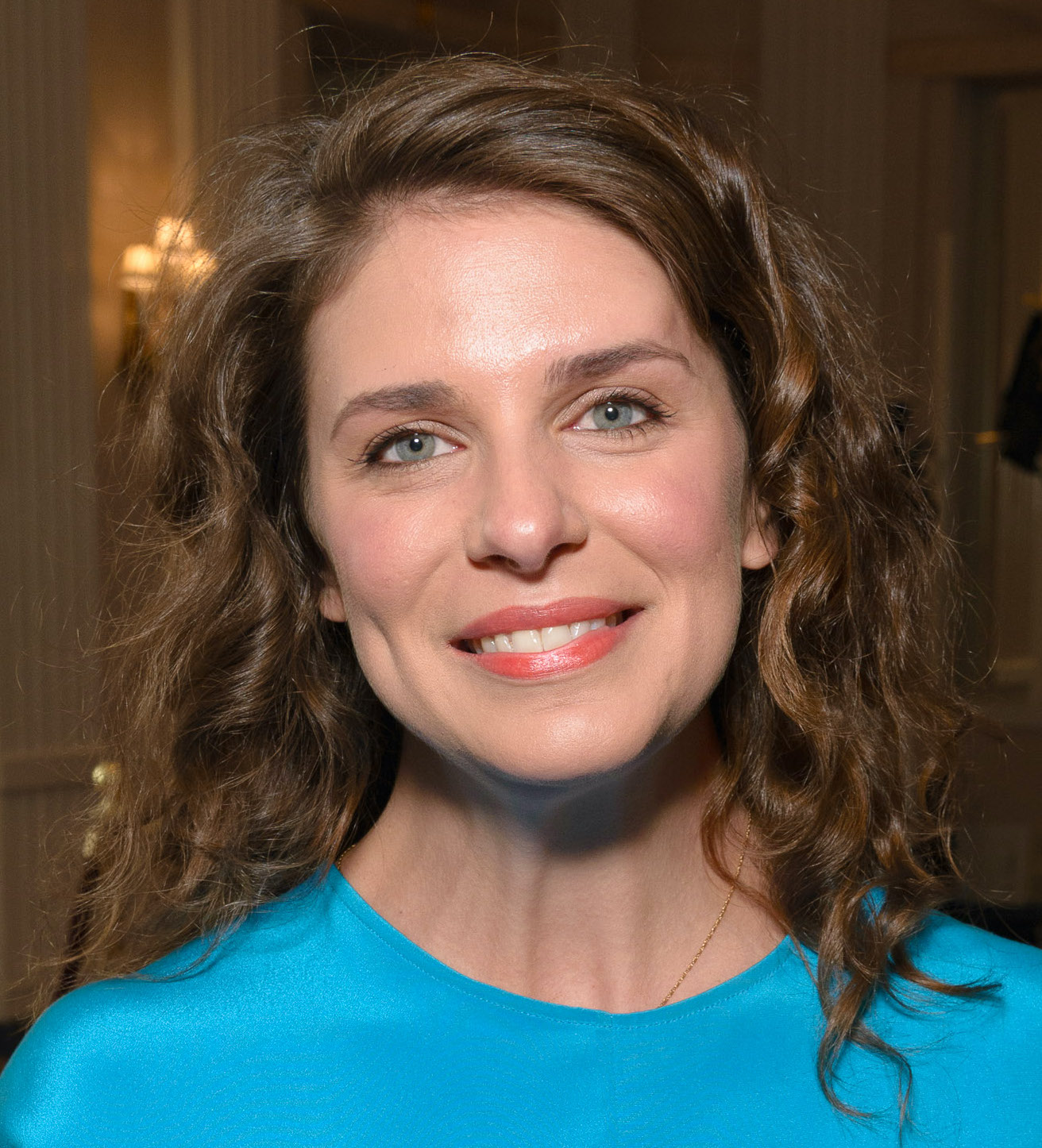
- Howard at the 73rd Annual Peabody Awards
- Born: Deep Run, NC
- Citizenship: United States
- Education: Salem Academy; Virginia Episcopal School
- Alma mater: North Carolina State University; Institute of Culinary Education
- Occupations: Chef; Restaurateur; Author; Television host
- Known for: A Chef's Life
- Spouse: Benjamin Knight (?-2023) divorced
- Children: 2
- Awards: Peabody Award 2014
- Website: vivianhoward.com

Vivian Howard is an American chef, restaurateur, author and television host. From 2013 to 2018, Howard hosted the PBS television series A Chef's Life focusing on the ingredients and cooking traditions of eastern North Carolina — using the backdrop of the Chef & the Farmer restaurant in Kinston, North Carolina, which Howard co-owned with her then-husband and business partner, Ben Knight.

In 2014, Howard was the first woman since Julia Child to win a Peabody Award for a cooking program. In 2017, she authored the cookbook-memoir Deep Run Roots, and in 2020 This Will Make It Taste Good: A New Path to Simple Cooking.

In 2023, Howard wrote an opinion piece for the New York Times, outlining the foundational problems with the current restaurant business model, many that contributed directly to the post-pandemic temporary closure of The Chef and the Farmer — which she reopened in a re-envisioned format as a story-telling tasting menu seating.

== Background ==
Howard grew up in Deep Run, North Carolina, a small community near the town of Kinston. Her parents, John and Scarlett Howard, were farmers who raised hogs and grew tobacco, cotton, soybeans, wheat, and corn. Her father owns J.C. Howard Farms, Inc., a pork production company with 27,000 pigs, and owns 5,000 acres of farmland, 5,000 acres in forestland, a timber production company, and fourteen John Deere dealerships. Howard's grandfather and great-grandfather were also tobacco farmers in Lenoir County.

At age 14, Howard attended Salem Academy, an all-girls boarding school in Winston-Salem, North Carolina, where she was classmates with Adrian H. Wood. She then spent two years at Virginia Episcopal School, a boarding school in Lynchburg, Virginia. In 2001, she earned her BA in English Language from North Carolina State University. During her time at NCSU, she studied abroad for a semester in Argentina, as part of a culinary-themed program. After graduating, Howard moved to New York City and began working in advertising for Grey Worldwide. She quit after 18 months and started working as a waitress at Voyage restaurant. Scott Barton, the restaurant's executive chef, became her early mentor.

== Career ==
Howard graduated from the Institute of Culinary Education in NYC in 2004. She completed an internship at Wylie Dufresne's wd~50 and trained as Chef de Partie at Jean-Georges Vongerichten's Spice Market.

Howard married Ben Knight, one of her coworkers at Voyage, and the two started a soup delivery business out of their apartment in Harlem, an effort that included chilling soup in the bathtub. Despite offers from investors to open a brick and mortar location in New York, the couple agreed to accept Howard's parents' offer to buy a restaurant in Kinston. Howard and Knight moved to North Carolina in 2005 and opened Chef & the Farmer in 2006 in a downtown building, previously a print shop — and before that, a mule stable. More than 60% of the ingredients used in the restaurant come from within a 90-mile radius.

The restaurant creates modern interpretations of traditional southern dishes, often collected from members of her family's Eastern North Carolina community. In 2018, Howard said "Older folks in our community teach me how to make something very simple. One of the things I like about A Chef's Life and dislike about modern media, in general, is that [our culture is] very young-person-new-ideas driven, and I don’t think people call on the wisdom of older folks very much. To learn from them and share has been wonderful."

In 2012, the Chef & the Farmer building caught fire and was rebuilt. In the summer of 2022, Chef & the Farmer closed with plans to reopen with a different conception. Chef & the Farmer re-opened in December 2024 as the Counter at Chef & the Farmer and the Kitchen Bar at Chef & the Farmer.

In 2013, Howard and Knight opened the Boiler Room, which served oysters and burgers catty-corner from Chef & the Farmer, until its closure in May 2020.

Howard authored the cookbook and memoir Deep Run Roots - Stories and Recipes from my Corner of the South ISBN 0316381101, released in October 2016. The book remained on the New York Times Bestseller List for 3 weeks. In 2017, the book won four IACP Cookbook Awards including: Cookbook of the Year, Julia Child First Book Award, Outstanding Restaurant Cookbook, and Outstanding Cookbook in the General Category.

Howard and Knight opened a restaurant called Benny's Big Time Pizzeria on December 12, 2017, in Wilmington, NC's Warehouse District.

In 2020 Howard released her second cookbook This Will Make It Taste Good: A New Path to Simple Cooking ISBN 9780316241908. The cookbook is built around a core collection of flavorful bases that become key components in the section of recipes that follow. She also began to write a column for the southern magazine Garden & Gun.

In 2021 Howard opened Lenoir, her first restaurant in Charleston, SC, which includes a sister café Handy + Hot. She started Viv's Fridge, a prepared food take out vending machine. In 2024, she opened The Kitchen Bar in the Chef and the Farmer space and The Counter in Kinston. In 2025, she opened Theodosia in North Carolina's Outer Banks.

== Television ==
=== A Chef's Life ===
In 2011, after being concerned that certain food traditions would be lost without documentation, Howard contacted her friend Cynthia Hill, a filmmaker from Eastern North Carolina. Together, Howard and Hill filmed a pilot. PBS and South Carolina Educational Television picked up the show, and Seasons 1 and 2 aired nationally from 2013 to 2015. Season 5 premiered in October 2017. After five seasons, the show ended with a one-hour finale, "Harvest Special."

The show has attracted many fans to Chef & the Farmer, and has contributed to Kinston's increasing economic growth.

=== Somewhere South ===
In 2020, Howard returned to PBS to host Somewhere South. The six-part series explores dishes that are shared across cultures.

=== Kitchen Curious with Vivian Howard ===
Howard's latest PBS series on the Create TV network, Kitchen Curious with Vivian Howard, premiered on October 6, 2025. Presented by South Carolina ETV and distributed through American Public Television, the half-hour food series is described as a blend of kitchen science with Southern storytelling.

== Awards ==
A Chef's Life is a 2014 Peabody winner for Excellence in Broadcasting, a 2015 Daytime Emmy winner for Best Directing of a Lifestyle/Travel/Culinary program, and was a 2016 James Beard Foundation Award for Outstanding Culinary Host.

Howard in addition was nominated for James Beard Foundation Award for Television Program, On Location (2014, 2015, 2016), Visual and Technical Excellence (2015), Outstanding Personality Host (2015), and American Cooking: Deep Run Roots (2017). Howard was named a James Beard Foundation Award semifinalist for Best Chef Southeast five consecutive times (2011, 2012, 2013, 2014, 2015, 2016, 2017). She was also nominated for two other Daytime Emmys including: Outstanding Single Camera Photography (2015) and Outstanding Culinary Host (2017).

Chef & the Farmer has been given a AAA Four Diamond Award seven times (2010, 2011, 2012, 2013, 2014, 2015, 2016), a Wine Spectator Award of Excellence (2009), and was named an OpenTable Top 100 Restaurants in America (2011).

== Personal life ==
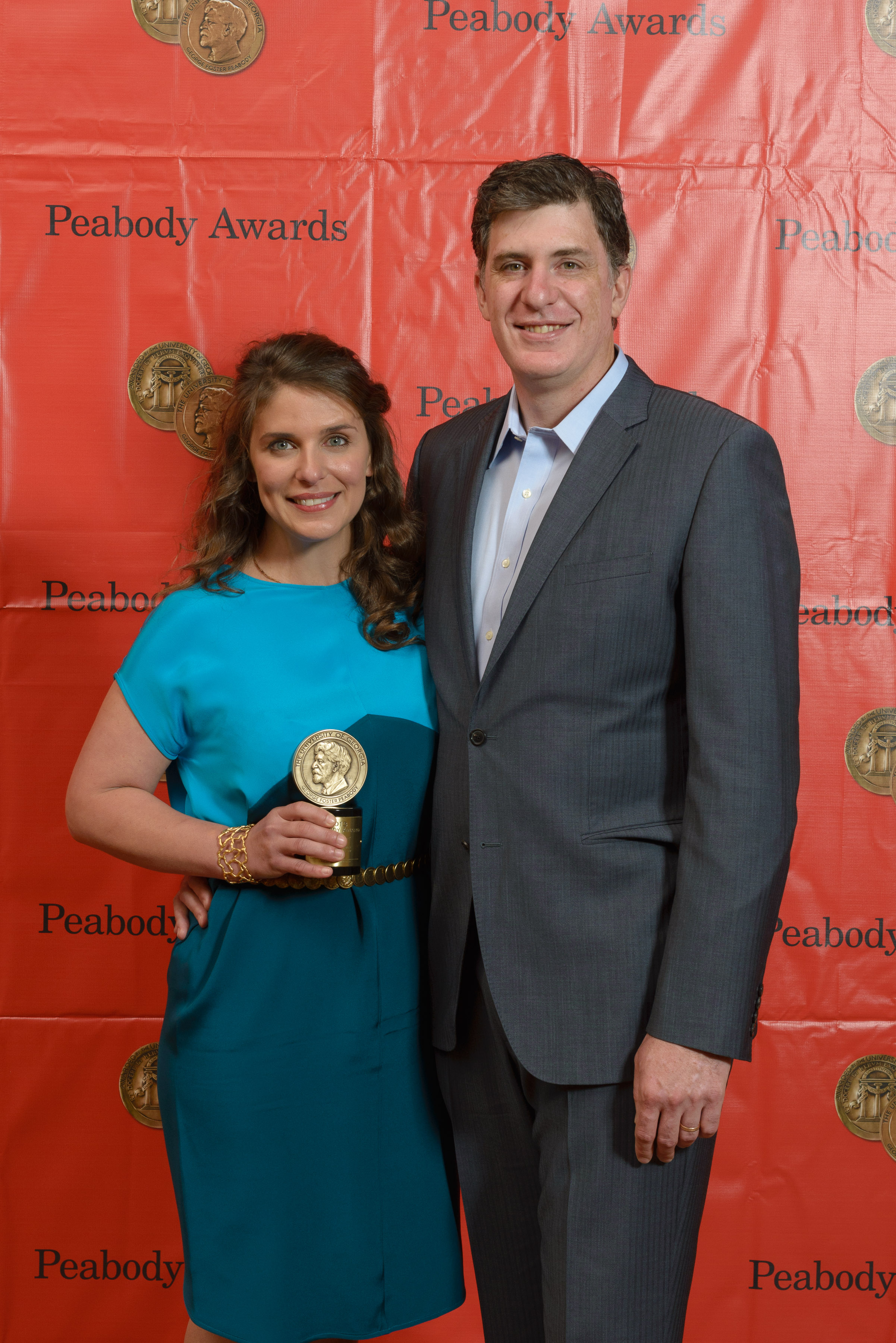
Vivian Howard and Ben Knight at the 73rd Annual Peabody Awards for "A Chef's Life"

Howard was married to Ben Knight, her co-owner at Chef & the Farmer and the Vivian Howard Restaurant Group. She confirmed in early 2023 the couple had divorced. The couple met while working together at Voyage restaurant in NYC. They lived on Howard's family homestead in Deep Run, North Carolina with their twins, Florence or Flo and Theodore or Theo.

== Bibliography ==
=== Cookbooks ===
- Deep Run Roots: Stories and Recipes from My Corner of the South (2016, Little, Brown and Company; ISBN 9780316381109 OCLC 1242328121)
- This Will Make It Taste Good: A New Path to Simple Cooking (2020, Voracious / Little, Brown and Company; ISBN 9780316381123 OCLC 1199991901)
