= Deep Run, Maryland =

Unincorporated community in Maryland, United States

- Unincorporated community
- Location within Maryland
- Coordinates: 39°41′06″N 76°59′23″W
- Country: United States
- State: Maryland
- County: Carroll
- Elevation: 643 ft (196 m)
- Time zone: UTC-5 (Eastern (EST))
  - Summer (DST): UTC-4 (EDT)
- Area codes: 410, 443, 667
- GNIS feature ID: 588641

Deep Run is an unincorporated community in Carroll County, Maryland, United States. Deep Run is located 7.6 miles (12.2 km) north of Westminster.
