= Deep Run (Fifteenmile Creek tributary) =

Tributary in Maryland, United States

Location
- Country: United States
- State: Maryland
- County: Allegany County

Physical characteristics
- Source
  - location: Allegany County, Maryland, United States
  - coordinates: 39°35′8″N 78°29′18″W
- Mouth
  - location: Allegany County, Maryland, United States
  - coordinates: 39°39′29″N 78°26′58″W
  - elevation: 669 ft (204 m)

Deep Run (Earth)
Deep Run (Maryland)

Deep Run is a tributary of the Fifteenmile Creek, Allegany County, Maryland, in the United States.
