= Deep Run (Springers Brook tributary) =

Location
- Country: United States
- State: New Jersey
- County: Burlington

Physical characteristics
- Source
  - location: Burlington County, New Jersey, United States
  - coordinates: 39°47′42″N 74°40′36″W
- Mouth
  - location: Burlington County, New Jersey, United States
  - coordinates: 39°44′22″N 74°41′0″W
  - elevation: 33 ft (10 m)

Deep Run (Earth)
Deep Run (New Jersey)

Deep Run is a tributary of Springers Brook in Burlington County, New Jersey in the United States. It is elevated at 33 ft (10m)

== See also ==
- List of rivers of New Jersey
