= Deep Run (South River tributary) =

Location
- Country: United States
- State: New Jersey
- County: Middlesex

Physical characteristics
- Source
  - location: Middlesex County, New Jersey, United States
  - coordinates: 40°20′31″N 74°15′28″W
- Mouth
  - location: Middlesex County, New Jersey, United States
  - coordinates: 40°25′17″N 74°21′28″W
  - elevation: 0 ft (0 m)

Basin features
- Tributaries
  - right: Sandy Brook

Deep Run (Earth)
Deep Run (the United States)
Deep Run (New Jersey)

Deep Run is a tributary of South River in Middlesex County, New Jersey in the United States.
