= Deep Run (Godbolt Creek tributary) =

- Deep Run (the United States) Deep Run (Alabama)

Location
- Country: United States
- State: Alabama
- County: Baldwin County

Physical characteristics
- Source
  - location: Baldwin County, Alabama, United States
  - coordinates: 30°55′20″N 87°46′48″W
- Mouth
  - location: Baldwin County, Alabama, United States
  - coordinates: 30°56′15″N 87°47′36″W
  - elevation: 95 ft (29 m)

Deep Run is a tributary of Godbolt Creek in Baldwin County, Alabama in the United States. The GNIS I.D. number is 117191.
