= Deep Run (Upper Broad Creek tributary) =

- Location within North Carolina Location within the United States

Location
- Country: United States
- State: North Carolina
- County: Craven County

Physical characteristics
- Source
  - location: Craven County, North Carolina, United States
- Mouth
  - location: Craven County, North Carolina, United States
  - coordinates: 35°07′24″N 76°56′54″W
  - elevation: 0 ft (0 m)

Deep Run is a tributary of Upper Broad Creek in Craven County, North Carolina. Its GNIS I.D. number is 984096.
