= Deep Run (Dawson Creek tributary) =

Location
- Country: United States
- State: North Carolina
- County: Pamlico County

Physical characteristics
- Source
  - location: Pamlico County, North Carolina, United States
  - coordinates: 35°0′12″N 76°48′37″W
- Mouth
  - location: Pamlico County, North Carolina, United States
  - coordinates: 35°1′31″N 76°47′13″W
  - elevation: 3 ft (0.91 m)

Deep Run (Earth)
Deep Run (the United States)
Deep Run (North Carolina)

Deep Run is a tributary of Dawson Creek in Pamlico County, North Carolina in the United States.
