= Deep Run (Ellison Creek tributary) =

- Deep Run (the United States) Deep Run (Illinois)

Location
- Country: United States
- State: Illinois
- County: Henderson County

Physical characteristics
- Source
  - location: Henderson County, Illinois, United States
  - coordinates: 40°49′22″N 90°53′20″W
- Mouth
  - location: Henderson County, Illinois, United States
  - coordinates: 40°46′41″N 90°57′50″W
  - elevation: 561 ft (171 m)

Deep Run is a tributary of Ellison Creek in Henderson County, Illinois in the United States. The GNIS I.D. number is 407054.
