= Deep Run (North Branch Patapsco River tributary) =

- Deep Run (the United States) Deep Run (Maryland)

Location
- Country: United States
- State: Maryland
- County: Carroll County

Physical characteristics
- Source
  - location: Carroll County, Maryland, United States
  - coordinates: 39°36′4″N 76°50′59″W
- Mouth
  - location: Carroll County, Maryland, United States
  - coordinates: 39°31′33″N 76°52′41″W
  - elevation: 453 ft (138 m)

Basin features
- Tributaries
  - left: Aspen Run

Deep Run is a tributary of the North Branch Patapsco River, in Carroll County, Maryland, in the United States.
