= Private Violence =

- Promotional poster
- Directed by: Cynthia Hill
- Produced by: Cynthia Hill
- Cinematography: Rex Miller
- Edited by: Tom Vickers
- Music by: Chuck Johnson
- Production companies: Markay Media; Chicken & Egg Pictures; HBO Documentary Films; Candescent Films; Artemis Rising Foundation
- Distributed by: HBO
- Release date: January 19, 2014 (Sundance)
- Running time: 80 minutes
- Country: United States
- Language: English

Private Violence is a 2014 American documentary film directed and produced by Cynthia Hill. The film focuses on the issue of domestic violence, as told through two survivors. Ultimately, the film centers on dispelling the logic of the commonly asked question: “Why didn’t she just leave?”

Private Violence premiered in the U.S. Documentary Competition program at the 2014 Sundance Film Festival on January 19, 2014, where it won the Candescent Award. The film was also shown at Full Frame Documentary Film Festival, True/False Film Festival, Dallas International Film Festival, HotDocs Film Festival, and the Doxa Documentary Film Festival. It won the Kathleen Bryan Edwards Award for Human Rights at Full Frame and the Silver Heart Award at the Dallas International Film Festival.

On July 16, 2015, the film was nominated for a Primetime Emmy Award in the Outstanding Information Programing – Long Form category. HBO Documentary Films first broadcast Private Violence on October 20, 2014. HBO films and Women Make Movies are both distributors.

== Synopsis ==
The film narrates the story of domestic violence survivors: Kit Gruelle, a domestic violence victim turned advocate who seeks justice for all female violence survivors, and Deanna Walters, whose estranged husband Robbie kidnapped and beat her for four days in the cab of his truck but was not arrested for it.

== Reception ==
The film received mostly positive response from critics. In his review for Variety, Dennis Harvey said that "Cynthia Hill delivers a vivid portrait of one leading justice advocate and one survivor of horrific spousal abuse." David Rooney of The Hollywood Reporter gave the film a positive review and said that "Cynthia Hill's Private Violence offers an interesting procedural account and, along the way, gets to know the impressively dedicated advocate, Kit Gruelle, who sees it through to the end." Brian Tallerico from Film Threat said, "Just by being truthful and honest with its subjects, Cynthia Hill's film feels like a call to action. Listen to it."

Matt Zoller Zeitz of Vulture called Private Violence "difficult to experience, essential to watch." Seitz compares Private Violence to other documentaries about domestic violence, stating that "None can touch the power, sensitivity, and explanatory skill of this one. It's not just wallowing in pain, it's illuminating the social architecture that encloses and protects abusers and preserves the status quo." Tom Roston of BillMoyers.com included it among the 10 great social justice documentary films of 2014: "The domestic abuse relationship is so uniquely tragic because it happens behind closed doors where it abides by its own twisted rules and illogic. In director Cynthia Hill’s Private Violence, there’s hope in dismantling that terror. The film is a disturbing and bold depiction of a social issue that necessitates the abuse be so bad that help may no longer be relevant. Thankfully, as told here, there are advocates and women courageous enough to fight back so that healing can take hold."

== Accolades ==
It received a 2015 Emmy nomination for "Outstanding Informational Programming."
