= Deep Run Park =

Park in Virginia, United States

- Interactive map of Deep Run Park
- Location: Henrico County, Virginia, United States
- Nearest city: Richmond, Virginia
- Coordinates: 37°37′34″N 77°35′20″W
- Area: 164.792 acres (0.66689 km^{2})
- Established: 1987
- Governing body: Henrico County, Virginia

Deep Run Park is a public park located in western Henrico County, Virginia at the northwest corner of Gaskins Road and Ridgefield Parkway.

Henrico County acquired an initial 52.045 acres of land for the park in 1978 and an additional 108.767 acres in 1979, although the park was not opened for public use until 1987. An additional 3.98 acres of land was acquired in 2004, increasing the total size of the park to 164.792 acres.

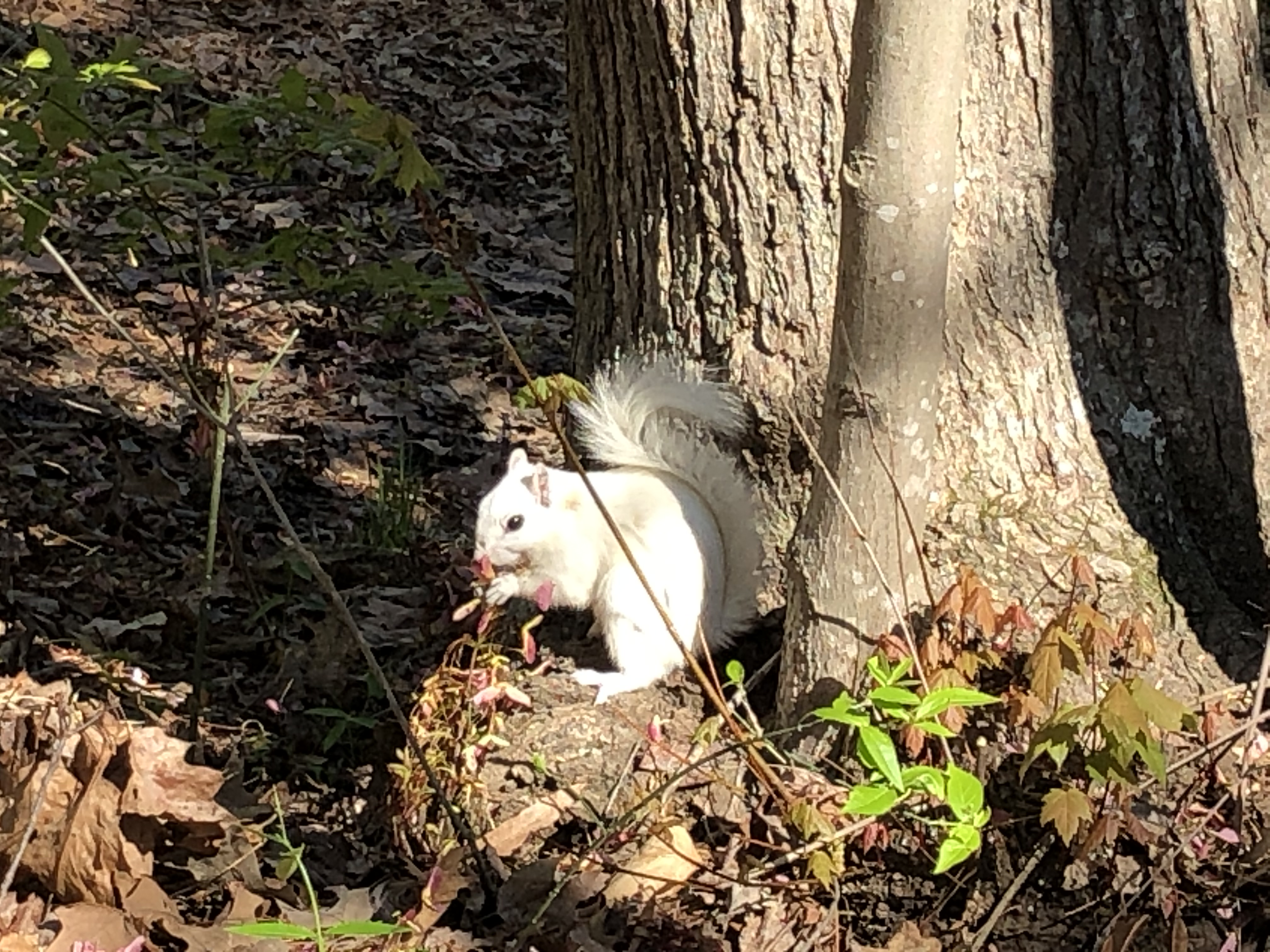
White squirrel in Deep Run Park.

Park features include:

- Picnic Area
- Picnic Shelter
- Restrooms
- Play Equipment and swingset
- Open Play Areas
- Exercise Trails
- Hiking/Nature Trails
- Fishing
- Concessions
- Baseball/Softball Fields
- Soccer/Football Fields
- Recreation Center
