= Deep Run, North Carolina =

- Census-designated place
- Location within North Carolina Location within the United States
- Country: United States
- State: North Carolina
- County: Lenoir

Area
  - Total: 2.84 sq mi (7.35 km^{2})
  - Land: 2.84 sq mi (7.35 km^{2})
  - Water: 0 sq mi (0.00 km^{2})
- Elevation: 108 ft (33 m)

Population (2020)
  - Total: 572
  - Density: 201.6/sq mi (77.82/km^{2})
- Time zone: UTC-5 (Eastern (EST))
  - Summer (DST): UTC-4 (EDT)
- Area code: 252
- GNIS feature ID: 2812795

Deep Run is an unincorporated community and census-designated place (CDP) in southern Lenoir County, North Carolina, United States. It was first listed as a CDP in the 2020 census with a population of 572.

== History ==
The village of Deep Run was incorporated in 1925 through 1928. The mayor of the town was Mr. Johnny Blizzard. At one time, the town was called Red Town, due to the number of houses with red tin roofs. A once thriving town, the town's charter was canceled by the North Carolina General Assembly in the 1970s, as the town failed to meet municipal standards. Today, Deep Run is still an agricultural area, with several businesses and light industries. The community provides a fire service, water and sewer, banking, and a postal route. The main thoroughfare through the area is the North Carolina Highway 11 Bypass. The town is a quiet town with no stoplights, three churches, Pleasant Hill Masonic Lodge #304, a few small businesses, and South Lenoir High School.

== Demographics ==
Historical population
| Census | Pop. | Note | %± |
|---|---|---|---|
| 2020 | 572 | | — |
U.S. Decennial Census; 2020

=== 2020 census ===
Deep Run CDP, North Carolina - Demographic Profile (NH = Non-Hispanic)
| Race / Ethnicity | Pop 2020 | % 2020 |
|---|---|---|
| White alone (NH) | 406 | 70.98% |
| Black or African American alone (NH) | 31 | 5.42% |
| Native American or Alaska Native alone (NH) | 2 | 0.35% |
| Asian alone (NH) | 1 | 0.17% |
| Pacific Islander alone (NH) | 0 | 0.00% |
| Some Other Race alone (NH) | 2 | 0.35% |
| Mixed Race/Multi-Racial (NH) | 5 | 0.87% |
| Hispanic or Latino (any race) | 125 | 21.85% |
| Total | 572 | 100.00% |

Note: the US Census treats Hispanic/Latino as an ethnic category. This table excludes Latinos from the racial categories and assigns them to a separate category. Hispanics/Latinos can be of any race.

== Notable people ==
- Harold Hardison, politician
- Vivian Howard, chef host of two PBS cooking shows (A Chef’s Life and Somewhere South)
