= Jackson Historic District (Jackson, North Carolina) =

Historic district in North Carolina, United States

- U.S. National Register of Historic Places
- U.S. Historic district
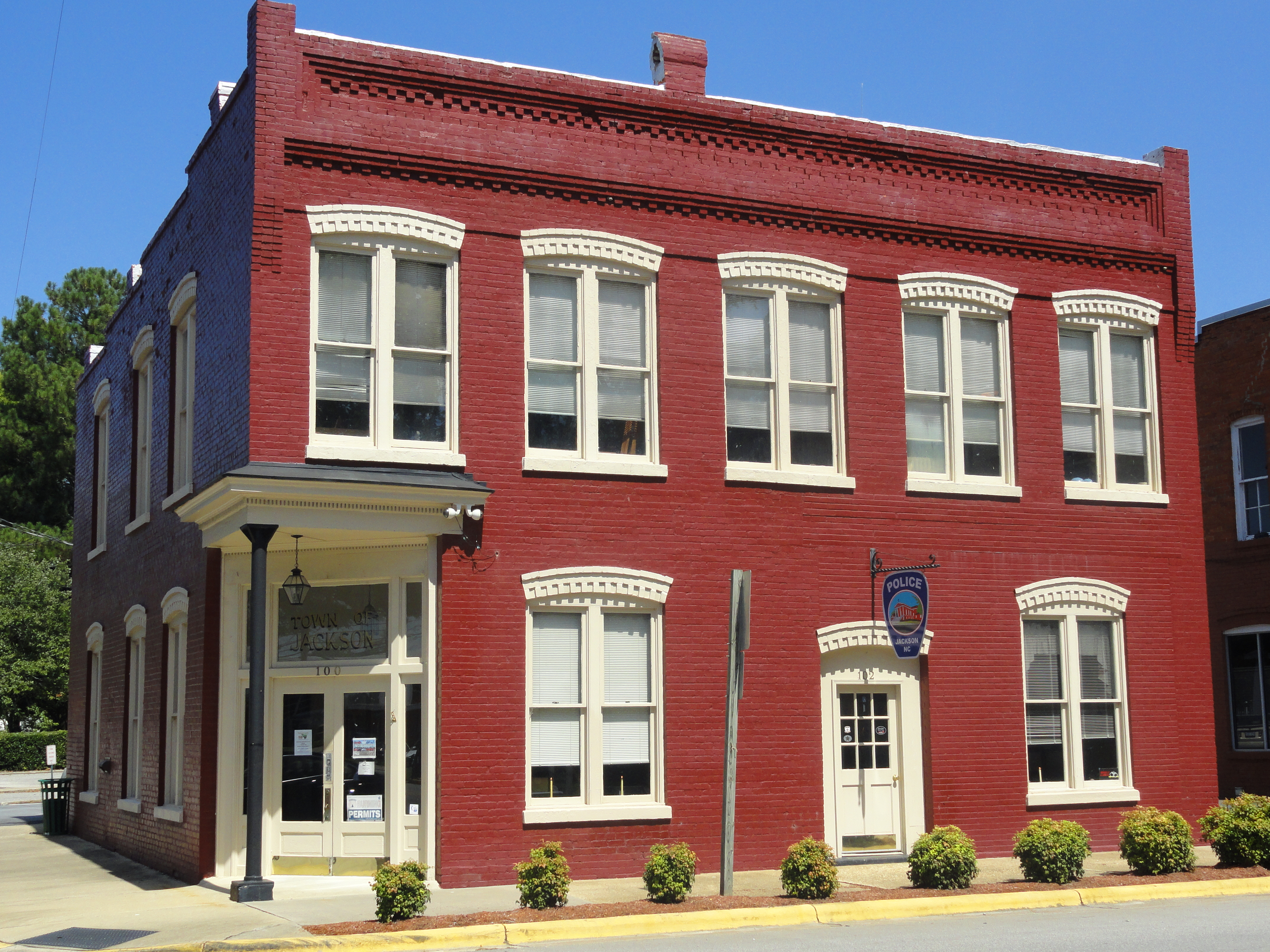

- Location within North Carolina Location within the United States
- Location: Roughly bounded by Atherton St., Picard St., Buxton St., and northern town limit line, Jackson, North Carolina
- Coordinates: 36°23′34″N 77°25′22″W
- Area: 110 acres (45 ha)
- Built: c. 1825-1953
- Architect: Bragg, Thomas Sr.; et.al.
- Architectural style: Federal, Greek Revival
- NRHP reference No.: 04000606
- Added to NRHP: June 16, 2004

Jackson Historic District is a national historic district located at Jackson, Northampton County, North Carolina. The district encompasses 168 contributing buildings, 2 contributing sites, 1 contributing structure, and 2 contributing objects in the central business district and surrounding residential sections of Jackson. The district developed between about 1825 and 1953 and includes notable examples of Federal and Greek Revival style architecture. Located in the district are the separately listed Amis-Bragg House, Church of the Saviour and Cemetery, and Northampton County Courthouse Square. Other notable contributing resources include Lewis Drug Store (1930), Kennedy's Five Cents to Five Dollars Store (c. 1930), Bank of Northampton (1928), Bowers Hardware Store (c, 1927), Atlas Oil Company Building (c. 1925), Farmer's Cotton Gin Complex, Faison House (c. 1825), Saint Catherine's Hall (1848), Judge Robert Peebles House (1890s), Selden-Boone House (c. 1900), Jackson Baptist Church (1881), and Jackson United Methodist Church (1937).

It was listed on the National Register of Historic Places in 2004.
