= 1972 United States presidential election in North Carolina =

- November 7, 1972
- Turnout: 64.41%

Nominee	Richard Nixon	George McGovern
Party	Republican	Democratic
Home state	California	South Dakota
Running mate	Spiro Agnew	Sargent Shriver
Electoral vote	13	0
Popular vote	1,054,889	438,705
Percentage	69.46%	28.89%

Nixon
50–60%
60–70%
70–80%
80–90%
McGovern
50–60%
President before election
Richard Nixon
Republican
Elected President
Richard Nixon
Republican

The 1972 United States presidential election in North Carolina took place on November 7, 1972, as part of the 1972 United States presidential election. Voters chose 13 representatives, or electors to the Electoral College, who voted for president and vice president.

Amidst a nationwide landslide defeat especially felt in the South, McGovern won only two counties in North Carolina, neither of which have voted for a Republican presidential candidate since the Fourth Party System era: Orange County in the Research Triangle region, home of the University of North Carolina at Chapel Hill, and majority-Black Northampton County in the northeast of the state. Even in these counties, where most Democratic candidates receive over sixty percent of the vote (and where Walter Mondale in 1984 would still win by double digits), McGovern won by less than five points. Among white voters, 78% supported Nixon, while only 20% supported McGovern.

== Primaries ==
=== Democratic ===
1972 North Carolina Democratic Party presidential primary
- May 6, 1972

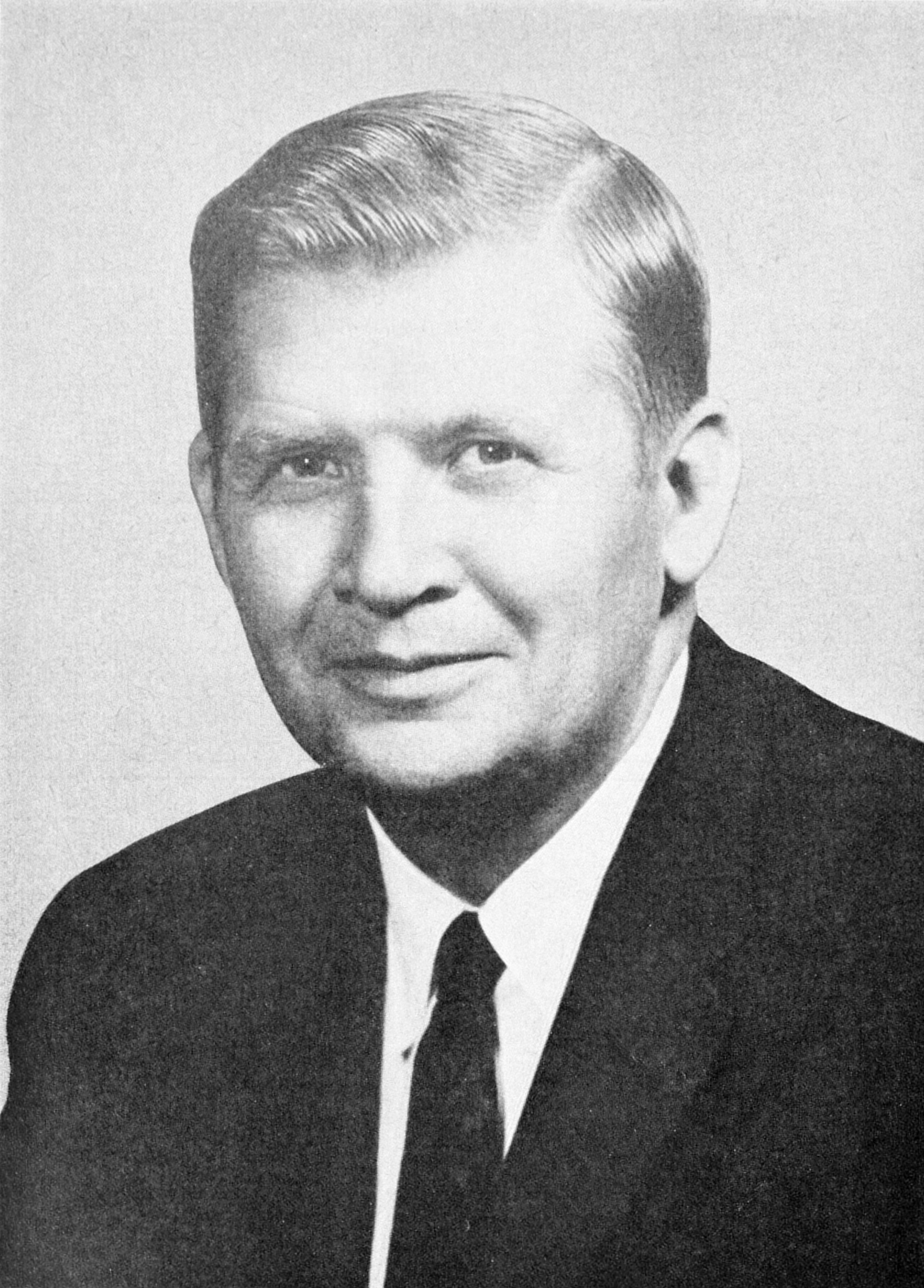

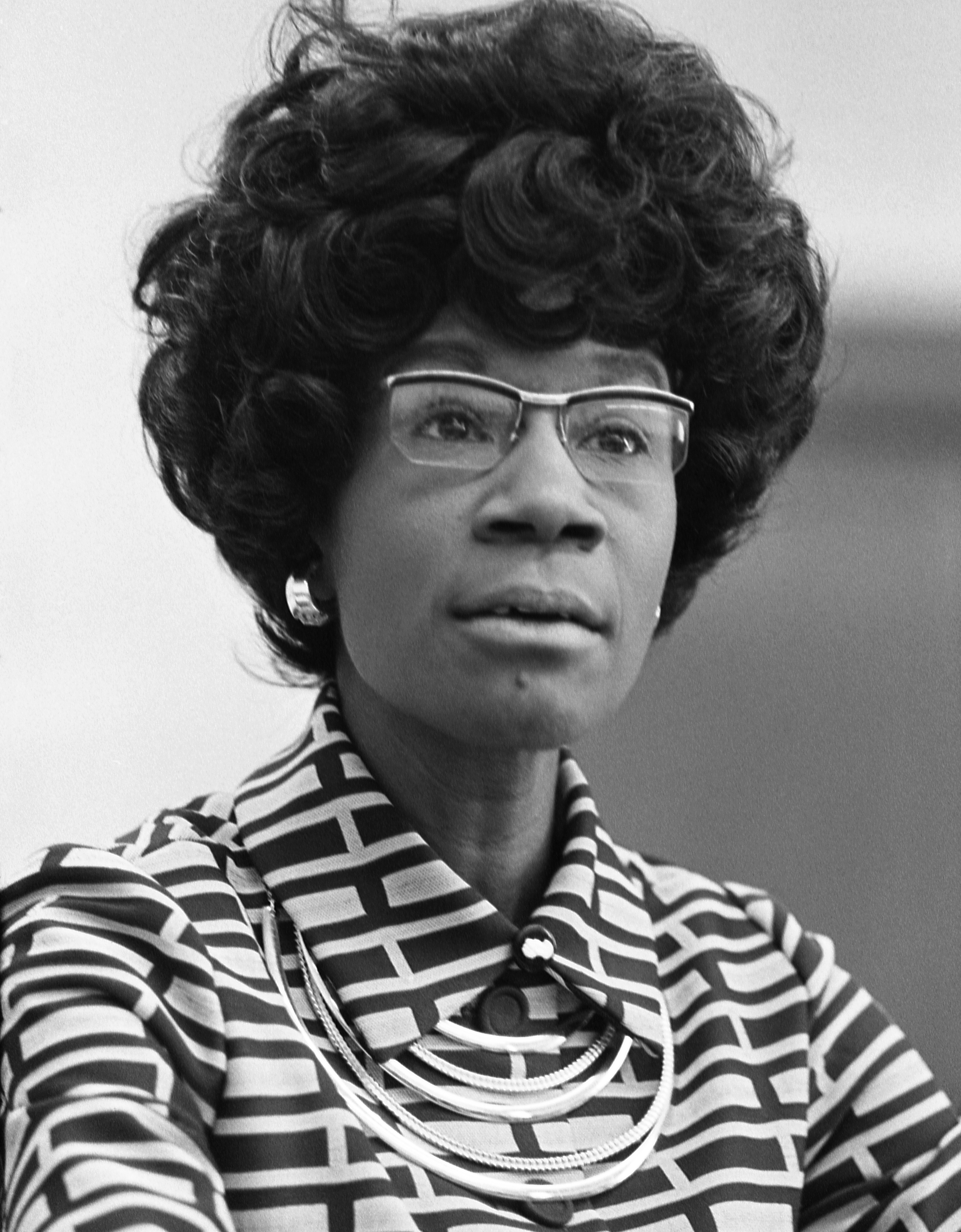
Candidate	George Wallace	Terry Sanford	Shirley Chisholm
Home state	Alabama	North Carolina	New York
Popular vote	413,518	306,014	61,723
Percentage	50.34%	37.26%	7.51%
County Results
Wallace
40-50%
50-60%
60-70%
70-80%
Sanford
40-50%
50-60%
60-70%

Alabama Governor, George Wallace, would defeat favorite son candidate, Terry Sanford.

Democratic Primary – May 6, 1972
Party	Candidate	Votes	%
Democratic	George Wallace	413,518	50.34%
Democratic	Terry Sanford	306,014	37.26%
Democratic	Shirley Chisholm	61,723	7.51%
Democratic	Edmund Muskie	30,739	3.74%
Democratic	Henry M. Jackson	9,416	1.15%
Total votes		821,410	100

== Campaign ==
=== Polls ===
Source	Rating	As of
Corvallis Gazette-Times	Safe R	September 19, 1972
The Bradenton Herald	Certain R	October 9, 1972
The Austin American	Certain R	November 1, 1972
Sun Herald	Certain R	November 5, 1972

== Results ==
1972 United States presidential election in North Carolina
Party	Candidate	Votes	Percentage	Electoral votes
Republican	Richard Nixon (incumbent)	1,054,889	69.46%	13
Democratic	George McGovern	438,705	28.89%	0
American Independent	John G. Schmitz	25,018	1.65%	0
Write-ins (Note: These write-in votes were not separated by county but given only as a state-wide total.)	Various candidates	162	0.01%	0
Totals		1,518,774	100.0%	13
Voter turnout		44.35%		—

=== By county ===
County	Richard Nixon Republican		George McGovern Democratic		John G. Schmitz American		Margin		Total
County	#	%	#	%	#	%	#	%	Total
Alamance	22,046	74.61%	6,833	23.12%	670	2.27%	15,213	51.49%	29,549
Alexander	5,865	68.95%	2,468	29.01%	173	2.04%	3,397	39.94%	8,506
Alleghany	2,158	61.29%	1,304	37.03%	59	1.68%	854	24.26%	3,521
Anson	3,551	60.88%	2,188	37.51%	94	1.61%	1,363	23.37%	5,833
Ashe	5,784	62.95%	3,313	36.06%	91	0.99%	2,471	26.89%	9,188
Avery	3,510	83.99%	627	15.00%	42	1.01%	2,883	68.99%	4,179
Beaufort	6,915	69.65%	2,901	29.22%	112	1.13%	4,014	40.43%	9,928
Bertie	2,874	60.54%	1,819	38.32%	54	1.14%	1,055	22.22%	4,747
Bladen	4,205	64.72%	2,201	33.88%	91	1.40%	2,004	30.84%	6,497
Brunswick	6,153	69.06%	2,500	28.06%	256	2.88%	3,653	41.00%	8,909
Buncombe	32,091	70.38%	12,626	27.69%	877	1.93%	19,465	42.69%	45,594
Burke	14,447	68.96%	6,197	29.58%	306	1.46%	8,250	39.38%	20,950
Cabarrus	18,384	76.45%	5,336	22.19%	328	1.36%	13,048	54.26%	24,048
Caldwell	12,976	71.41%	4,886	26.89%	309	1.70%	8,090	44.52%	18,171
Camden	909	60.20%	556	36.82%	45	2.98%	353	23.38%	1,510
Carteret	8,463	74.14%	2,805	24.57%	147	1.29%	5,658	49.57%	11,415
Caswell	2,983	59.65%	1,922	38.43%	96	1.92%	1,061	21.22%	5,001
Catawba	24,106	74.46%	7,744	23.92%	525	1.62%	16,362	50.54%	32,375
Chatham	6,175	62.12%	3,624	36.46%	142	1.42%	2,551	25.66%	9,941
Cherokee	4,113	62.28%	2,411	36.51%	80	1.21%	1,702	25.77%	6,604
Chowan	1,906	66.39%	936	32.60%	29	1.01%	970	33.79%	2,871
Clay	1,545	65.19%	797	33.63%	28	1.18%	748	31.56%	2,370
Cleveland	13,726	72.06%	4,994	26.22%	328	1.72%	8,732	45.84%	19,048
Columbus	8,468	70.64%	3,305	27.57%	214	1.79%	5,163	43.07%	11,987
Craven	9,372	78.74%	2,384	20.03%	147	1.23%	6,988	58.71%	11,903
Cumberland	24,376	70.46%	9,853	28.48%	366	1.06%	14,523	41.98%	34,595
Currituck	1,578	66.67%	718	30.33%	71	3.00%	860	36.34%	2,367
Dare	1,986	75.20%	634	24.01%	21	0.79%	1,352	51.19%	2,641
Davidson	24,875	74.79%	7,691	23.12%	696	2.09%	17,184	51.67%	33,262
Davie	5,613	75.69%	1,578	21.28%	225	3.03%	4,035	54.41%	7,416
Duplin	7,153	70.61%	2,857	28.20%	120	1.19%	4,296	42.41%	10,130
Durham	25,576	61.38%	15,566	37.36%	525	1.26%	10,010	24.02%	41,667
Edgecombe	8,244	62.53%	4,635	35.16%	305	2.31%	3,609	27.37%	13,184
Forsyth	46,415	67.69%	20,928	30.52%	1,226	1.79%	25,487	37.17%	68,569
Franklin	5,431	68.37%	2,341	29.47%	172	2.16%	3,090	38.90%	7,944
Gaston	27,956	75.76%	8,462	22.93%	483	1.31%	19,494	52.83%	36,901
Gates	1,264	51.01%	1,177	47.50%	37	1.49%	87	3.51%	2,478
Graham	1,699	61.05%	1,057	37.98%	27	0.97%	642	23.07%	2,783
Granville	6,037	66.82%	2,918	32.30%	80	0.88%	3,119	34.52%	9,035
Greene	2,788	75.68%	847	22.99%	49	1.33%	1,941	52.69%	3,684
Guilford	61,381	69.46%	25,800	29.20%	1,185	1.34%	35,581	40.26%	88,366
Halifax	8,908	66.60%	4,241	31.71%	226	1.69%	4,667	34.89%	13,375
Harnett	10,259	74.64%	3,347	24.35%	138	1.01%	6,912	50.29%	13,744
Haywood	8,903	64.84%	4,515	32.88%	313	2.28%	4,388	31.96%	13,731
Henderson	12,134	80.17%	2,701	17.85%	300	1.98%	9,433	62.32%	15,135
Hertford	2,794	58.34%	1,928	40.26%	67	1.40%	866	18.08%	4,789
Hoke	1,927	56.25%	1,466	42.79%	33	0.96%	461	13.46%	3,426
Hyde	1,112	69.28%	403	25.11%	90	5.61%	709	44.17%	1,605
Iredell	16,736	73.79%	5,088	22.43%	858	3.78%	11,648	51.36%	22,682
Jackson	4,709	59.11%	3,169	39.78%	89	1.11%	1,540	19.33%	7,967
Johnston	14,272	79.24%	3,488	19.37%	251	1.39%	10,784	59.87%	18,011
Jones	1,650	58.93%	1,093	39.04%	57	2.03%	557	19.89%	2,800
Lee	5,836	72.71%	2,024	25.22%	166	2.07%	3,812	47.49%	8,026
Lenoir	11,065	73.89%	3,672	24.52%	238	1.59%	7,393	49.37%	14,975
Lincoln	8,597	61.88%	5,100	36.71%	195	1.41%	3,497	25.17%	13,892
Macon	4,134	69.20%	1,749	29.28%	91	1.52%	2,385	39.92%	5,974
Madison	3,273	61.18%	2,039	38.11%	38	0.71%	1,234	23.07%	5,350
Martin	4,188	68.76%	1,840	30.21%	63	1.03%	2,348	38.55%	6,091
McDowell	6,570	72.09%	2,348	25.76%	196	2.15%	4,222	46.33%	9,114
Mecklenburg	77,546	68.52%	33,730	29.80%	1,900	1.68%	43,816	38.72%	113,176
Mitchell	4,240	83.45%	800	15.74%	41	0.81%	3,440	67.71%	5,081
Montgomery	4,417	65.67%	2,175	32.34%	134	1.99%	2,242	33.33%	6,726
Moore	9,406	70.68%	3,627	27.25%	275	2.07%	5,779	43.43%	13,308
Nash	12,679	71.39%	4,503	25.35%	579	3.26%	8,176	46.04%	17,761
New Hanover	19,060	74.41%	5,894	23.01%	661	2.58%	13,166	51.40%	25,615
Northampton	2,997	47.71%	3,233	51.46%	52	0.83%	−236	−3.75%	6,282
Onslow	10,343	80.05%	2,424	18.76%	154	1.19%	7,919	61.29%	12,921
Orange	11,632	47.66%	12,634	51.76%	142	0.58%	−1,002	−4.10%	24,408
Pamlico	1,847	66.11%	919	32.89%	28	1.00%	928	33.22%	2,794
Pasquotank	3,906	63.07%	2,115	34.15%	172	2.78%	1,791	28.92%	6,193
Pender	3,327	68.90%	1,415	29.30%	87	1.80%	1,912	39.60%	4,829
Perquimans	1,299	62.57%	723	34.83%	54	2.60%	576	27.74%	2,076
Person	5,941	71.89%	2,246	27.18%	77	0.93%	3,695	44.71%	8,264
Pitt	14,406	70.41%	5,858	28.63%	195	0.96%	8,548	41.78%	20,459
Polk	3,121	67.31%	1,416	30.54%	100	2.15%	1,705	36.77%	4,637
Randolph	18,724	76.02%	5,346	21.71%	559	2.27%	13,378	54.31%	24,629
Richmond	5,692	60.84%	3,508	37.49%	156	1.67%	2,184	23.35%	9,356
Robeson	11,362	59.99%	7,391	39.02%	188	0.99%	3,971	20.97%	18,941
Rockingham	14,519	71.15%	5,530	27.10%	358	1.75%	8,989	44.05%	20,407
Rowan	20,735	73.34%	6,834	24.17%	705	2.49%	13,901	49.17%	28,274
Rutherford	9,506	68.80%	4,140	29.97%	170	1.23%	5,366	38.83%	13,816
Sampson	9,684	65.76%	4,888	33.19%	154	1.05%	4,796	32.57%	14,726
Scotland	3,485	63.69%	1,938	35.42%	49	0.89%	1,547	28.27%	5,472
Stanly	12,459	69.32%	5,218	29.03%	295	1.65%	7,241	40.29%	17,972
Stokes	7,118	66.86%	3,254	30.57%	274	2.57%	3,864	36.29%	10,646
Surry	10,497	67.78%	4,706	30.39%	284	1.83%	5,791	37.39%	15,487
Swain	2,052	64.45%	1,101	34.58%	31	0.97%	951	29.87%	3,184
Transylvania	5,860	69.73%	2,321	27.62%	223	2.65%	3,539	42.11%	8,404
Tyrrell	676	59.30%	459	40.26%	5	0.44%	217	19.04%	1,140
Union	10,264	71.60%	3,886	27.11%	186	1.29%	6,378	44.49%	14,336
Vance	6,491	66.85%	3,117	32.10%	102	1.05%	3,374	34.75%	9,710
Wake	56,808	70.32%	22,807	28.23%	1,174	1.45%	34,001	42.09%	80,789
Warren	2,603	59.62%	1,698	38.89%	65	1.49%	905	20.73%	4,366
Washington	2,559	61.65%	1,546	37.24%	46	1.11%	1,013	24.41%	4,151
Watauga	6,017	62.85%	3,451	36.05%	105	1.10%	2,566	26.80%	9,573
Wayne	14,352	72.33%	5,234	26.38%	256	1.29%	9,118	45.95%	19,842
Wilkes	13,105	72.83%	4,634	25.75%	255	1.42%	8,471	47.08%	17,994
Wilson	12,060	73.04%	4,166	25.23%	286	1.73%	7,894	47.81%	16,512
Yadkin	6,824	79.16%	1,592	18.47%	205	2.37%	5,232	60.69%	8,621
Yancey	3,106	57.10%	2,278	41.88%	56	1.02%	828	15.22%	5,440
Totals	1,054,889	69.46%	438,705	28.89%	25,018	1.65%	616,184	40.57%	1,518,612

== Works cited ==
- Black, Earl; Black, Merle (1992). The Vital South: How Presidents Are Elected. Harvard University Press. ISBN 0674941306.
