= Matt W. Ransom =

American politician

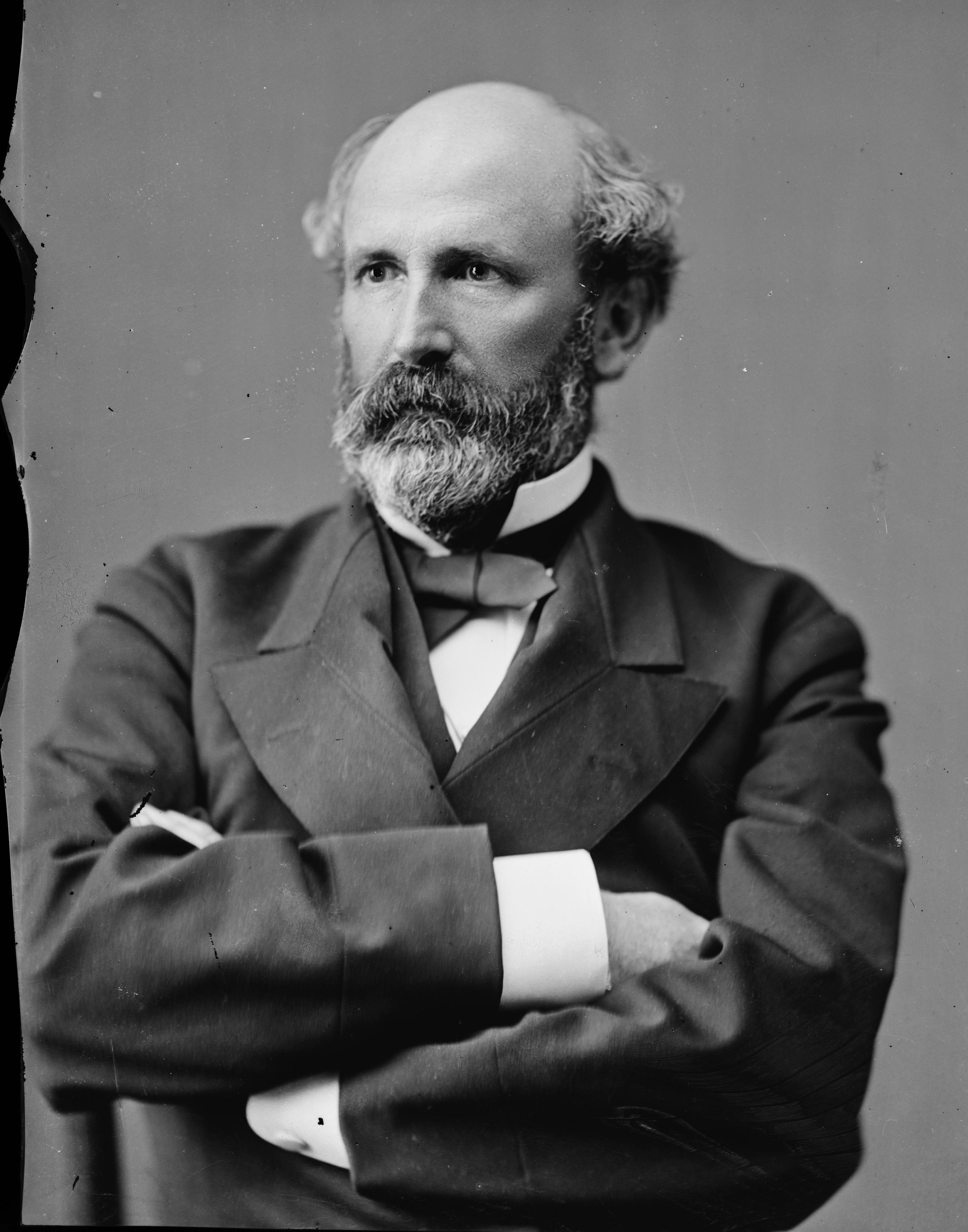

President pro tempore of the United States Senate
- In office January 7, 1895 – January 10, 1895
- Preceded by: Isham G. Harris
- Succeeded by: Isham G. Harris

United States Senator from North Carolina
- In office January 30, 1872 – March 4, 1895
- Preceded by: Joseph Carter Abbott
- Succeeded by: Marion Butler

United States Minister to Mexico
- In office August 24, 1895 – February 13, 1897
- President: Grover Cleveland
- Preceded by: Isaac P. Gray
- Succeeded by: Powell Clayton

Attorney General of North Carolina
- In office 1853–1855
- Governor: David Settle Reid
- Preceded by: William Eaton Jr.
- Succeeded by: Joseph B. Batchelor

Personal details
- Born: October 8, 1826 Warren County, North Carolina, U.S.
- Died: October 8, 1904 (aged 78) Garysburg, North Carolina, U.S.
- Party: Democratic

Military service
- Allegiance: Confederate States
- Branch/service: Confederate States Army
- Years of service: 1861–1865
- Rank: Brigadier general
- Unit: 1st North Carolina Infantry Regiment
- Commands: 35th North Carolina Infantry; Ransom's Brigade
- Battles/wars: American Civil War

Matthew Whitaker Ransom (October 8, 1826 – October 8, 1904) was a general in the Confederate States Army during the American Civil War and a Democratic U.S. senator from the state of North Carolina between 1872 and 1895.

== Early life ==
Matt Ransom was born in Warren County, North Carolina, to Robert and Priscilla Whitaker Ransom. He was the elder brother of General Robert Ransom, a cousin to fellow Confederate officer Wharton J. Green, who served as a U. S. Congressman after the Civil War, and a cousin to physician and aviation pioneer William Whitney Christmas. Matt Ransom graduated from the University of North Carolina in 1847, where he was a member of the Philanthropic Society.

== Career ==
After serving as North Carolina Attorney General and as a member of the North Carolina General Assembly, Matt W. Ransom was chosen as one of the three commissioners from North Carolina to the Confederate government at Montgomery, Alabama, in 1861.

=== American Civil War ===
Ransom was commissioned lieutenant colonel of the 1st North Carolina Infantry Regiment and later colonel of the 35th North Carolina Infantry. This regiment was part of his brother Robert's brigade, which Matt later commanded. Ransom was promoted to brigadier general on June 13, 1863. Ransom saw action in the battles of Seven Pines, the Seven Days Battles, Antietam, Fredericksburg, Suffolk, Plymouth, Weldon, and the siege of Petersburg. He was wounded three times during the Civil War and finally surrendered at Appomattox.

=== Later life ===
After the war, Ransom moved to Weldon, North Carolina, in 1866 where he was a planter and lawyer. In 1872, he was elected as a Democrat to the United States Senate to fill the vacancy in the term commencing March 4, 1871. Ransom was re-elected in 1876, 1883, and 1889 and served from January 30, 1872, to March 4, 1895. Ransom served briefly as President Pro tempore of the Senate during the 53rd Congress. He was later appointed United States Minister to Mexico and served from 1895 to 1897.

Following his term as ambassador, Ransom retired to Verona, his estate, and engaged in agricultural pursuits.

== Personal life ==
On January 19, 1853, Ransom married Martha Anne "Pattie" Exum of Northampton County, North Carolina. The couple resided at Verona, the Exum family's plantation on the banks of the Roanoke River. Matt and Martha produced at least eight children together: Matt W., Jr., Joseph E., George E., Esther, Patrick Exum, and Robert. A slaveholder, Matt W. Ransom also sired two children with Emma Outland, one of the African-American women Ransom enslaved: Douglas Ransom (born 1859) and Alice Ransom (wife of Edward "Ned" Rawles, one of North Carolina's first African-American state legislators).

He died near Garysburg, North Carolina, on his 78th birthday, October 8, 1904. Ransom was buried on his estate, near Jackson, North Carolina. Verona was listed on the National Register of Historic Places in 1975.

== See also ==
- List of American Civil War generals (Confederate)

== Notes ==
Legal offices
Preceded by William Eaton Jr.	Attorney General of North Carolina; 1853–1855	Succeeded by Joseph B. Batchelor
U.S. Senate
Preceded by Joseph C. Abbott	U.S. senator (Class 2) from North Carolina; 1872–1895; Served alongside: John Pool, Augustus S. Merrimon, Zebulon B. Vance, Thomas J. Jarvis, Jeter C. Pritchard	Succeeded by Marion Butler
Honorary titles
Preceded by Isham G. Harris	President pro tempore of the United States Senate; January 7, 1895 – January 10, 1895	Succeeded by Isham G. Harris
Diplomatic posts
Preceded by Isaac P. Gray	United States Ambassador to Mexico; 1895–1897	Succeeded by Powell Clayton
