= Seaboard Historic District =

Historic district in North Carolina, United States

- Seabord Historic District
- U.S. National Register of Historic Places
- U.S. Historic district
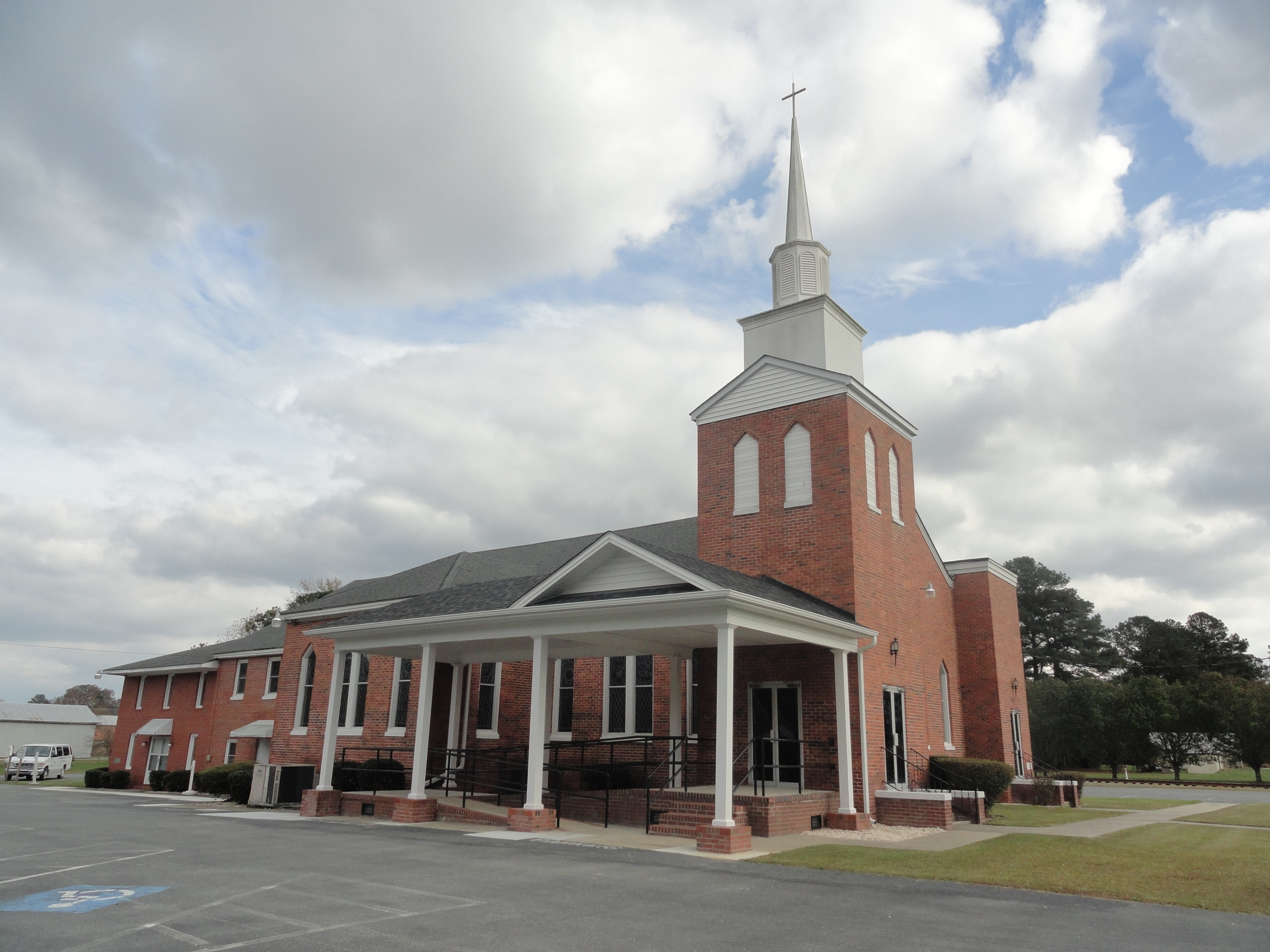
- Bethlehem Baptist Church (c. 1900)

- Location within North Carolina Location within the United States
- Location: Bounded by Main, Church and Washington Sts, and NC 186, Seaboard, North Carolina
- Coordinates: 36°29′15″N 77°26′34″W
- Area: 90 acres (36 ha)
- Built: 1917
- Architect: Riedel, R.H.; Draper, Godwin W.
- Architectural style: Queen Anne, Colonial Revival
- NRHP reference No.: 05001032
- Added to NRHP: September 15, 2005

Seaboard Historic District is a national historic district located at Seaboard, Northampton County, North Carolina. The district encompasses 107 contributing buildings, 1 contributing site, and 4 contributing structures in the central business district and surrounding residential sections of Seaboard. The district developed between about 1874 and 1955 and includes notable examples of Queen Anne and Colonial Revival style architecture. Notable contributing resources include the Edwards Warehouse (c. 1910), Bradley Howell Peanut Drying and Storage Facility (c. 1950), Sidney S. Harris Gas Station (c. 1930), Stephenson-Barbee House, Edwards House, Seaboard United Methodist Church (c. 1922), Bethlehem Baptist Church (c. 1900), and Seaboard School (1927).

It was listed on the National Register of Historic Places in 2005.
