= J.E. Piland House =

Historic house in North Carolina, United States

- U.S. National Register of Historic Places
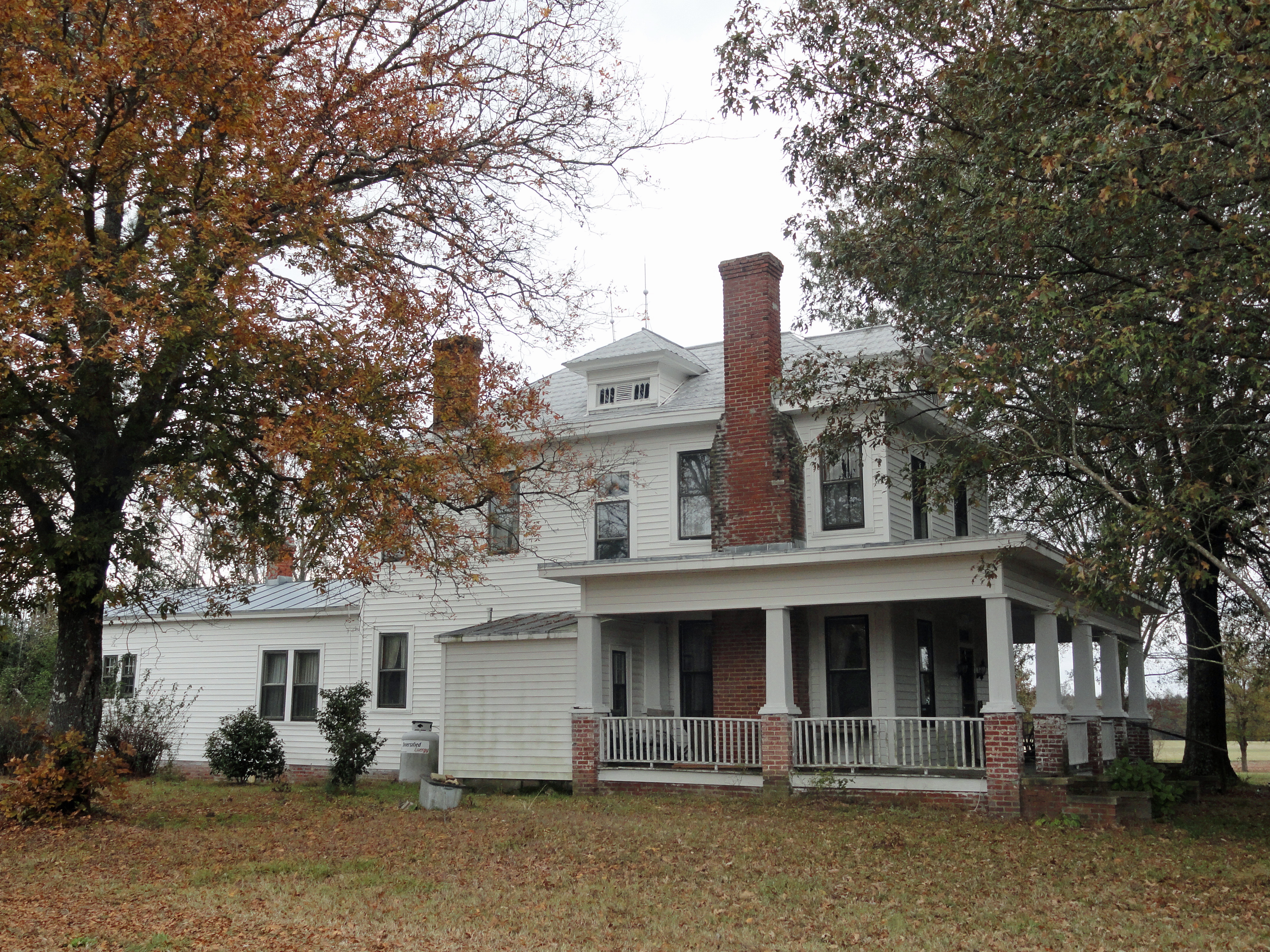

- Location within North Carolina Location within the United States
- Location: 148 Mt. Carmel Rd., near Margarettsville, North Carolina
- Coordinates: 36°30′58″N 77°20′06″W
- Area: 2 acres (0.81 ha)
- Built: 1910
- Built by: Piland, James Eldridge
- Architectural style: Queen Anne, Colonial Revival
- NRHP reference No.: 04000966
- Added to NRHP: September 10, 2004

J.E. Piland House, also known as Diamond Grove, is a historic home located near Margarettsville, Northampton County, North Carolina. It was built in 1910, and is a two-story, L-shaped, transitional Queen Anne / Colonial Revival style frame dwelling with a one-story rear wing. It has a high hipped roof, one-story wraparound porch, and exterior-end brick chimney. Also on the property is the contributing garage (c. 1910). The house was under restoration in 2001.

It was listed on the National Register of Historic Places in 2004.
