= Turners Crossroads, North Carolina =

Unincorporated community in North Carolina, US

Coordinates: 36°32′00″N 077°22′37″W

Turners Crossroads is an unincorporated community in Northampton County, North Carolina, United States, east-northeast of Margarettsville.
