= Verona (Jackson, North Carolina) =

Historic house in North Carolina, United States

- U.S. National Register of Historic Places
- HABS diagram of the house

- Location within North Carolina Location within the United States
- Location: 2 miles (3.2 km) west of Jackson on US 158, near Jackson, North Carolina
- Coordinates: 36°23′15″N 77°28′51″W
- Area: 9.5 acres (3.8 ha)
- Built: c. 1855
- Architectural style: Italian Villa, Tuscan Villa Mode
- NRHP reference No.: 75001286
- Added to NRHP: May 29, 1975

Verona is a historic plantation house located near Jackson, Northampton County, North Carolina. It was built about 1855, and is a one-story, six-bay, T-shaped, Italian Villa style frame dwelling. It has a hipped roof, is sheathed in weatherboard, and sits on a brick basement. It features a full-width porch, with flat sawnwork posts and delicate openwork brackets. Also on the property is the contributing family cemetery. The house was built for Matt Whitaker Ransom (1826-1904), Confederate brigadier general, United States senator, and minister to Mexico, and his wife Martha Exum.

It was listed on the National Register of Historic Places in 1975.
