= Margarettsville, North Carolina =

Unincorporated community in North Carolina, US

Coordinates: 36°31′53″N 77°20′56″W

Margarettsville, North Carolina

Margarettsville, North Carolina, United States, is an unincorporated community in northern Northampton County. The community is part of the Roanoke Rapids, North Carolina Micropolitan Statistical Area. The ZIP Code for Margarettsville is 27853.

Margarettsville is on North Carolina Highway 186, near the North Carolina-Virginia border. It is northeast of Turners Crossroads, has a Baptist Church, and a speedway, and is east of Seaboard.

== History ==
A post office has been in operation at Margarettsville since 1836. The community was named for Margaret Ridley.

The J.E. Piland House was listed on the National Register of Historic Places in 2004.
