= Milwaukee, North Carolina =

- Census-designated place
- Location within North Carolina Location within the United States
- Coordinates: 36°24′17″N 77°13′50″W
- Country: United States
- State: North Carolina
- County: Northampton

Area
  - Total: 1.75 sq mi (4.54 km^{2})
  - Land: 1.72 sq mi (4.45 km^{2})
  - Water: 0.031 sq mi (0.08 km^{2})
- Elevation: 89 ft (27 m)

Population (2020)
  - Total: 157
  - Density: 91.3/sq mi (35.25/km^{2})
- Time zone: UTC-5 (Eastern (EST))
  - Summer (DST): UTC-4 (EDT)
- ZIP code: 27854
- Area code: 252
- GNIS feature ID: 2812799

Milwaukee is an unincorporated community and census-designated place (CDP) in Northampton County, North Carolina, United States. It was first listed as a CDP in the 2020 census with a population of 157.

The ZIP code is 27854.

== Demographics ==
Historical population
Census	Pop.	Note	%±
2020	157		—
U.S. Decennial Census; 2020

=== 2020 census ===
Milwaukee CDP, North Carolina – Demographic Profile (NH = Non-Hispanic)
Race / Ethnicity	Pop 2020	% 2020
White alone (NH)	108	68.79%
Black or African American alone (NH)	33	21.02%
Native American or Alaska Native alone (NH)	0	0.00%
Asian alone (NH)	0	0.00%
Pacific Islander alone (NH)	0	0.00%
Some Other Race alone (NH)	1	0.64%
Mixed Race/Multi-Racial (NH)	6	3.82%
Hispanic or Latino (any race)	9	5.73%
Total	157	100.00%

Note: the US Census treats Hispanic/Latino as an ethnic category. This table excludes Latinos from the racial categories and assigns them to a separate category. Hispanics/Latinos can be of any race.
