= Wilson Roosevelt Jerman =

White House butler (1929–2020)

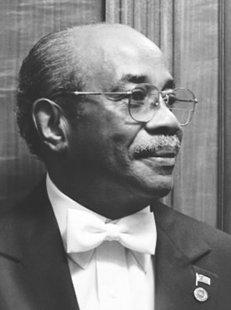
- Wilson Jerman in 2004
- Born: January 21, 1929; Seaboard, North Carolina, U.S.
- Died: May 16, 2020 (aged 91); Woodbridge, Virginia, U.S.
- Occupation: White House butler
- Children: 5

Wilson Roosevelt Jerman (January 21, 1929 – May 16, 2020) was an American butler who served 11 different U.S. presidents in the White House. He was one of the White House's longest serving employees except from 1993-2003

== Biography ==
Jerman was born in Seaboard, North Carolina, in 1929, the son of a farm worker. He dropped out of school at the age of 12 to work on a farm. In 1955, Jerman moved to Washington, D.C. and worked as a caterer before being hired as a cleaner by the White House in 1957 during the administration of Dwight D. Eisenhower.

Jerman was promoted to butler under John F. Kennedy; Jackie Kennedy gave Jerman two signed paintings that he hung in his home. He continued as a butler in the White House until his retirement in 1993 during the Bill Clinton administration. He returned to the White House in 2003 in the George W. Bush administration. Jerman worked as a maitre d' and elevator operator for Barack Obama before his final retirement in 2012.

To commemorate his 50-plus years of service in the White House, President Obama presented Jerman with a series of plaques depicting all 11 presidents he served. First Lady Michelle Obama included a picture of her and the president in an elevator with Jerman in her best-selling memoir, Becoming.

Jerman was married twice and had five children. His first wife, Gladys, died in 1966; Lyndon B. Johnson asked his personal physician to treat her before she died. Jerman's second wife, Helen, died in the 1990s.

Jerman died from complications of COVID-19 on May 16, 2020, at the age of 91, during the COVID-19 pandemic in Virginia.
