= Mowfield =

Historic house in North Carolina, United States

- U.S. National Register of Historic Places
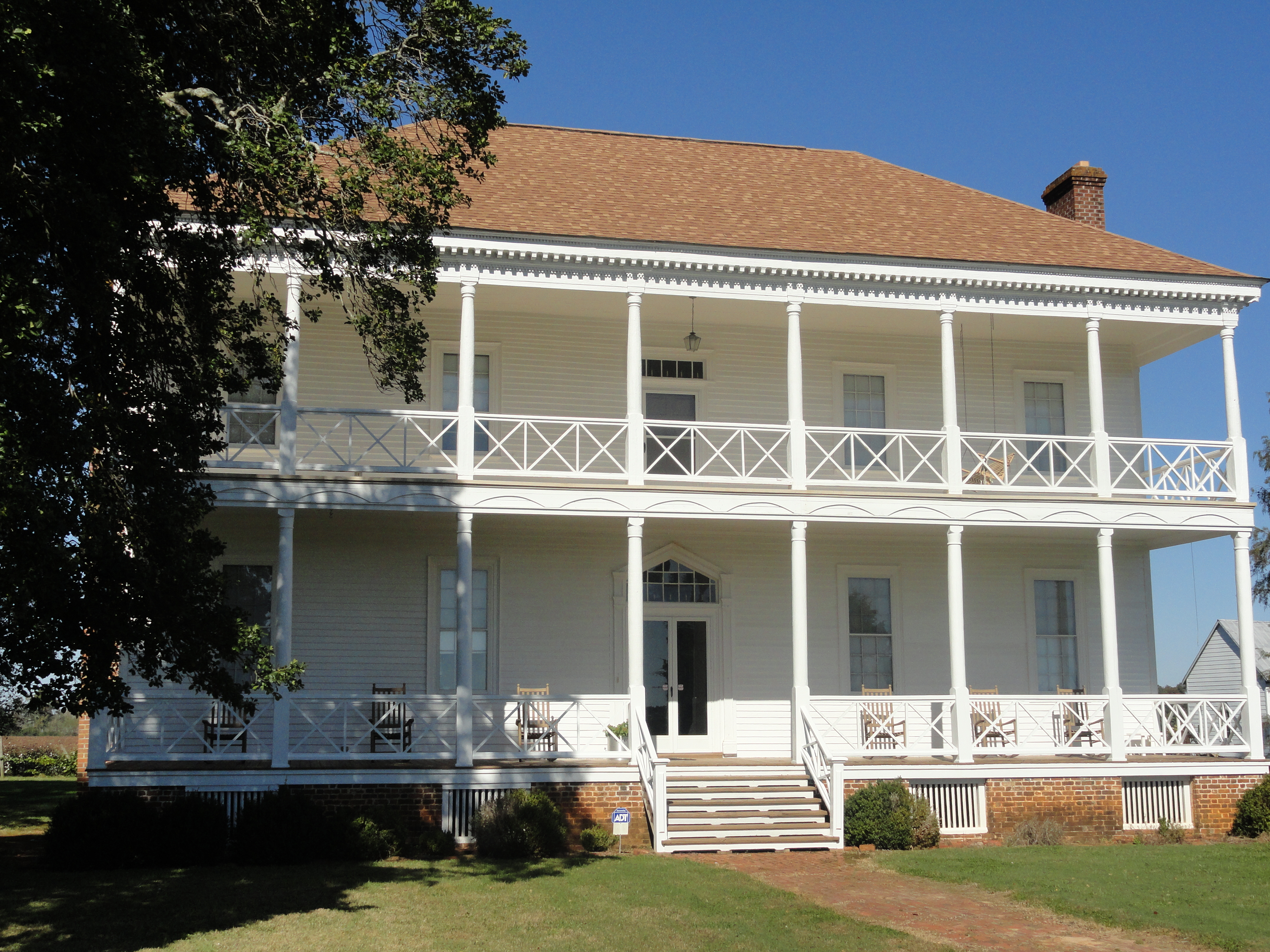

- Location within North Carolina Location within the United States
- Location: 2 miles (3.2 km) west of Jackson on US 158, near Jackson, North Carolina
- Coordinates: 36°23′50″N 77°27′45″W
- Area: 20 acres (8.1 ha)
- Built: c. 1802
- Architectural style: Georgian, Federal, Vernacular Federal
- NRHP reference No.: 75001285
- Added to NRHP: February 13, 1975

Mowfield is a historic plantation house located near Jackson, Northampton County, North Carolina. It was built about 1802, and is a two-story, five bay by two bay, Georgian / Federal style frame house with a two-story ell. Each section is covered by a hipped roof. It features a two-tier full-width porch, engaged under the high hip roof of the house. Also on the property is a contributing outbuilding. Mowfield Plantation was the home of Sir Archy, one of the greatest thoroughbred sires of the 19th century, where he was at stud from 1816 until his death in 1833.

It was listed on the National Register of Historic Places in 1975.
