= Woodland-Olney School =

School in Woodland, North Carolina

- U.S. National Register of Historic Places
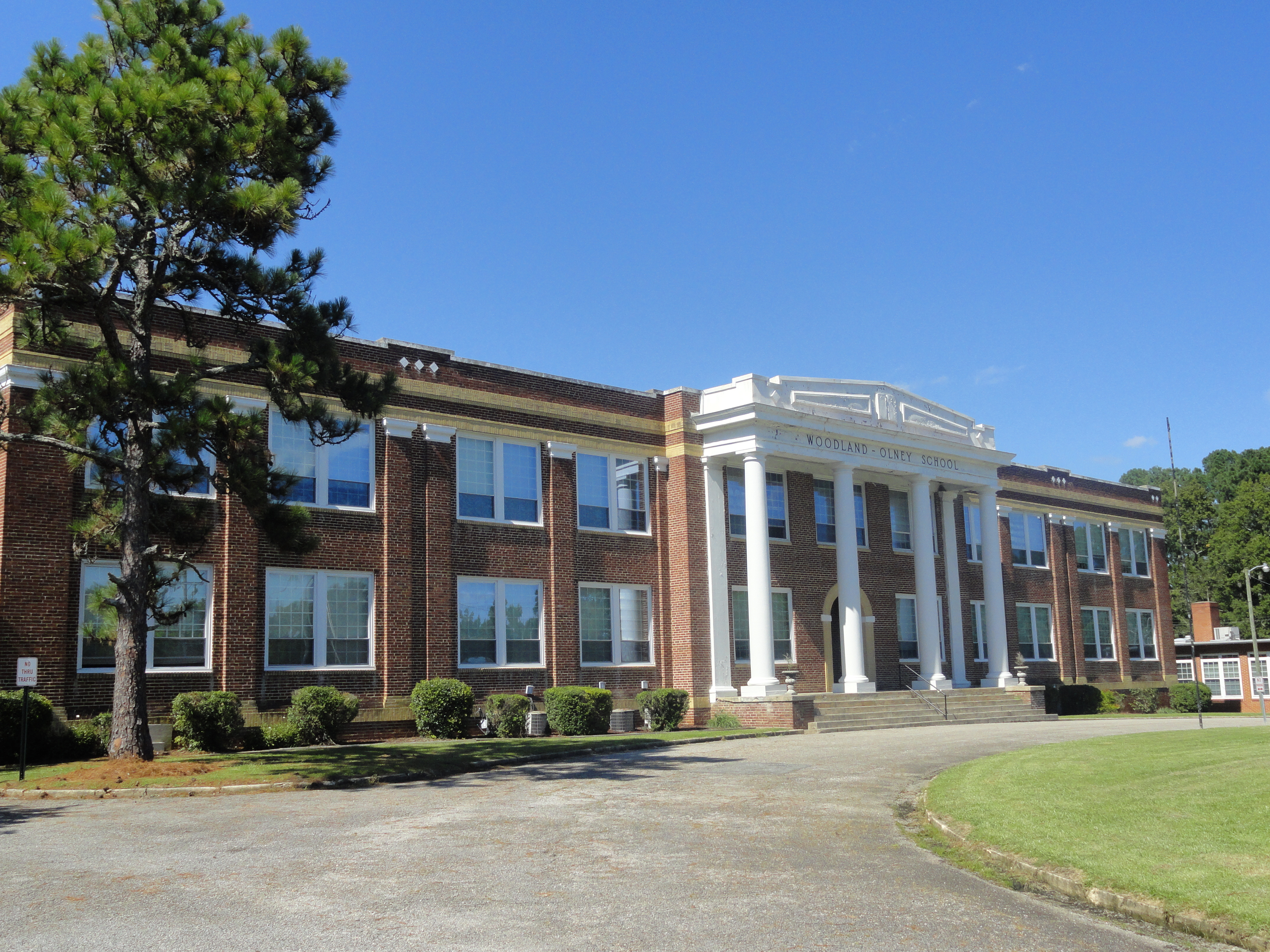

- Location within North Carolina Location within the United States
- Location: Main St., E of jct. of Magnolia and Main Sts., Woodland, North Carolina
- Coordinates: 36°19′40″N 77°13′8″W
- Area: 2 acres (0.81 ha)
- Built: 1928-1929
- Built by: Timberlake, E.S.
- Architect: Flanagan, Eric
- Architectural style: Classical Revival
- NRHP reference No.: 97001222
- Added to NRHP: October 8, 1997

Woodland-Olney School is a historic school building located at Woodland, Northampton County, North Carolina. It was built in 1928–1929, and is a two-story, 11 bay, U-shaped, Classical Revival style brick building. It has a one-story auditorium, flat roof, and two-story three bay portico, pilasters, and decorative yellow brick horizontal bands. It operated as a public school until 1992.

It was listed on the National Register of Historic Places in 1997.
