= Church of the Saviour and Cemetery =

Historic site in Northampton County, North Carolina, US

- U.S. National Register of Historic Places
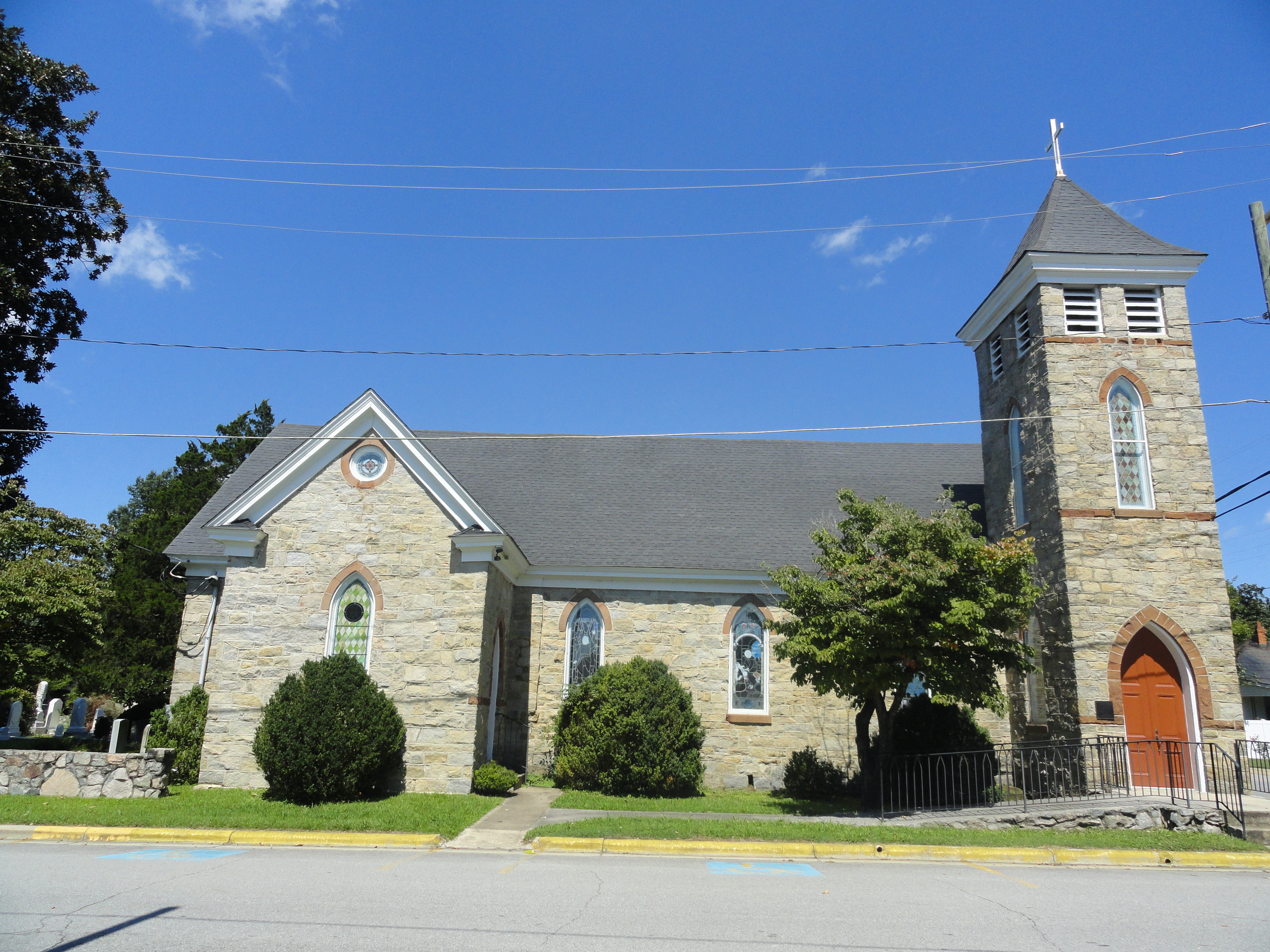

- Location within North Carolina Location within the United States
- Location: Church and Calhoun Sts., Jackson, North Carolina
- Coordinates: 36°23′28″N 77°25′20″W
- Area: 1.2 acres (0.49 ha)
- Built: 1898
- Architect: Adolphus Gustavus Bauer
- Architectural style: Gothic Revival
- NRHP reference No.: 00001614
- Added to NRHP: January 4, 2001

Church of the Saviour and Cemetery is a historic Episcopal church and cemetery located at the junction of Church and Calhoun Streets in Jackson, Northampton County, North Carolina. It was built between 1896 and 1898, and is a Gothic Revival style granite and brownstone church. It follows a basic gable-front plan and features a projecting three-stage entrance tower and separate sacristy. Adjacent to the church is the cemetery established in 1853.

It was listed on the National Register of Historic Places in 2001.
