= Woodland, North Carolina =

- Town
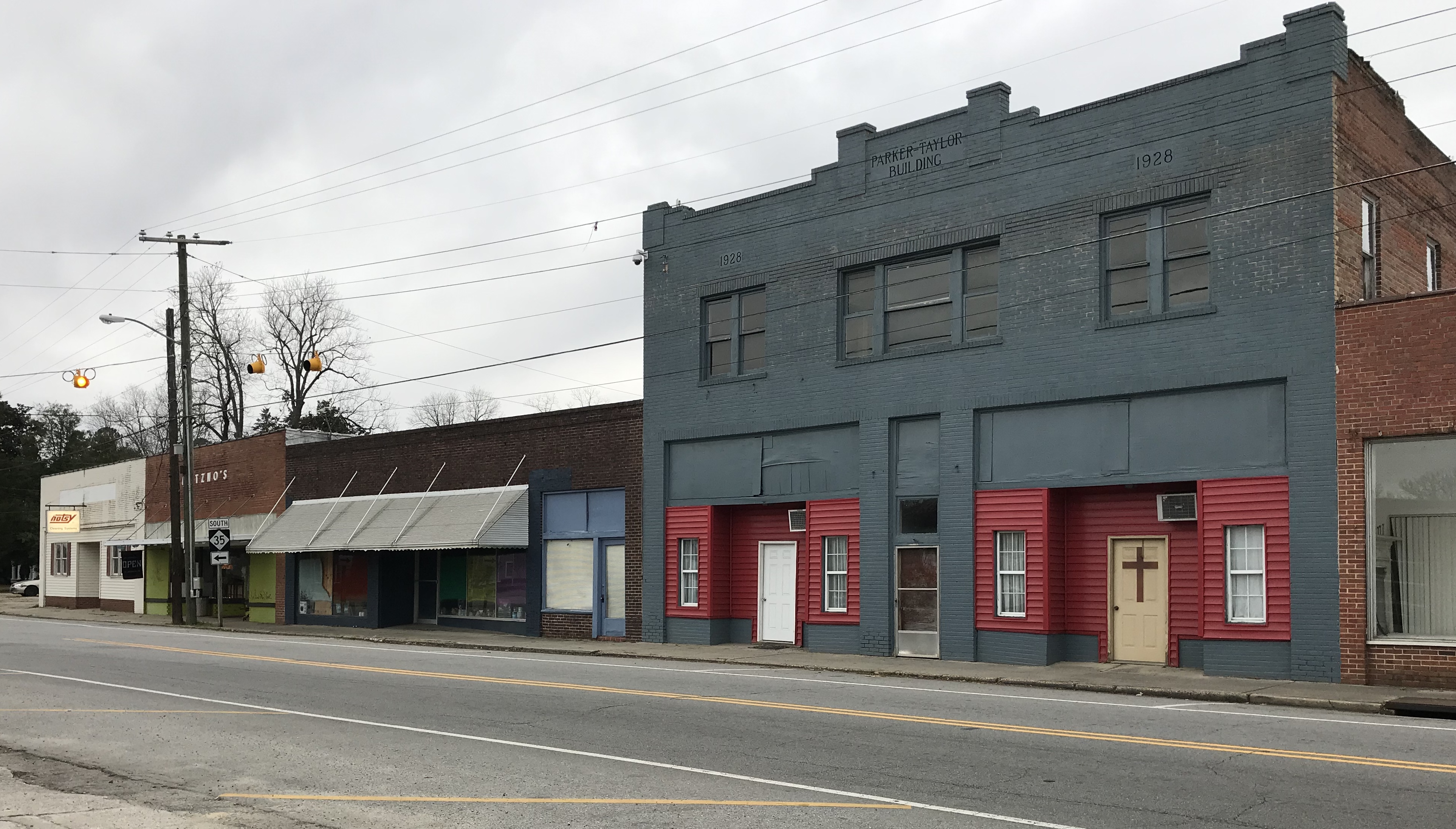

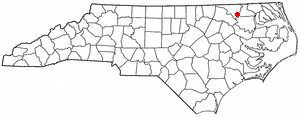
- Location of Woodland, North Carolina
- Coordinates: 36°19′50″N 77°12′54″W
- Country: United States
- State: North Carolina
- County: Northampton

Area
  - Total: 1.25 sq mi (3.24 km^{2})
  - Land: 1.25 sq mi (3.24 km^{2})
  - Water: 0 sq mi (0.00 km^{2})
- Elevation: 69 ft (21 m)

Population (2020)
  - Total: 557
  - Density: 445.1/sq mi (171.84/km^{2})
- Time zone: UTC-5 (Eastern (EST))
  - Summer (DST): UTC-4 (EDT)
- ZIP code: 27897
- Area code: 252
- FIPS code: 37-75340
- GNIS feature ID: 2406912
- Website: https://www.townofwoodlandnc.com/

Woodland is a town in Northampton County, North Carolina, United States. The population was 557 at the 2020 census. It is part of the Roanoke Rapids, North Carolina Micropolitan Statistical Area.

== History ==
The Woodland-Olney School was listed on the National Register of Historic Places in 1997.

== Geography ==
According to the United States Census Bureau, the town has a total area of 1.3 square miles (3.4 km^{2}), all land.

== Demographics ==
Historical population
Census	Pop.	Note	%±
1890	247		—
1900	242		−2.0%
1910	312		28.9%
1920	400		28.2%
1930	501		25.3%
1940	486		−3.0%
1950	590		21.4%
1960	651		10.3%
1970	744		14.3%
1980	861		15.7%
1990	760		−11.7%
2000	833		9.6%
2010	809		−2.9%
2020	557		−31.1%
U.S. Decennial Census

=== 2020 census ===
Woodland racial composition
Race	Number	Percentage
White (non-Hispanic)	238	42.73%
Black or African American (non-Hispanic)	269	48.29%
Native American	4	0.72%
Asian	2	0.36%
Other/Mixed	27	4.85%
Hispanic or Latino	17	3.05%

As of the 2020 United States census, there were 557 people, 325 households, and 220 families residing in the town.

=== 2000 census ===
As of the census of 2000, there were 833 people, 328 households, and 211 families residing in the town. The population density was 644.6 inhabitants per square mile (248.9/km^{2}). There were 356 housing units at an average density of 275.5 per square mile (106.4/km^{2}). The racial makeup of the town was 51.02% White, 47.78% African American, 0.48% Native American, 0.60% from other races, and 0.12% from two or more races. Hispanic or Latino of any race were 0.96% of the population.

There were 328 households, out of which 28.7% had children under the age of 18 living with them, 39.6% were married couples living together, 22.9% had a female householder with no husband present, and 35.4% were non-families. 32.3% of all households were made up of individuals, and 16.2% had someone living alone who was 65 years of age or older. The average household size was 2.52 and the average family size was 3.19.

In the town, the population was spread out, with 31.5% under the age of 18, 7.0% from 18 to 24, 21.5% from 25 to 44, 23.4% from 45 to 64, and 16.7% who were 65 years of age or older. The median age was 35 years. For every 100 females, there were 77.2 males. For every 100 females age 18 and over, there were 71.5 males.

The median income for a household in the town was $22,125, and the median income for a family was $30,804. Males had a median income of $28,438 versus $23,125 for females. The per capita income for the town was $12,682. About 21.4% of families and 28.1% of the population were below the poverty line, including 40.4% of those under age 18 and 27.3% of those age 65 or over.

== Politics ==
Woodland is in the first congressional district of North Carolina, and since 2004 has been represented in Congress by G. K. Butterfield. It is within the traditionally Democratic county of Northampton, which was one of only two counties in the state won by George McGovern in his 1972 defeat by Richard Nixon.
