= 1984 United States presidential election in North Carolina =

- November 6, 1984
- Turnout: 68.45% ▲1.57 pp

Nominee	Ronald Reagan	Walter Mondale
Party	Republican	Democratic
Home state	California	Minnesota
Running mate	George H. W. Bush	Geraldine Ferraro
Electoral vote	13	0
Popular vote	1,346,481	824,287
Percentage	61.90%	37.89%

Reagan
50–60%
60–70%
70–80%
Mondale
50–60%
60–70%
President before election
Ronald Reagan
Republican
Elected President
Ronald Reagan
Republican

The 1984 United States presidential election in North Carolina took place on November 6, 1984, and was part of the 1984 United States presidential election. Voters chose 13 representatives, or electors to the Electoral College, who voted for president and vice president.

North Carolina voted for President Ronald Reagan, running with Vice President George H. W. Bush, against former Vice President Walter Mondale, running with U.S. Representative Geraldine Ferraro.

As of the 2024 presidential election, this is the last election in which Vance County and Chatham County voted for a Republican presidential candidate.

== Campaign ==
Jesse Jackson's voters were 89% black, 8% white, 1% Hispanic, and 2% were members of other groups.

Among white voters, 73% supported Reagan while 27% supported Mondale.

== Results ==
1984 United States presidential election in North Carolina
Party	Candidate	Votes	Percentage	Electoral votes
Republican	Ronald Reagan (incumbent)	1,346,481	61.90%	13
Democratic	Walter Mondale	824,287	37.89%	0
Libertarian	David Bergland	3,794	0.17%	0
Socialist Workers	Melvin Mason	799	0.04%	0
Totals		2,175,361	100.00%	13
Voter turnout				—

=== Results by county ===
County	Ronald Reagan Republican		Walter Mondale Democratic		David Bergland Libertarian		Melvin Mason Socialist Workers		Margin		Total
County	#	%	#	%	#	%	#	%	#	%	Total
Alamance	26,063	69.74%	11,230	30.05%	68	0.18%	9	0.02%	14,833	39.69%	37,370
Alexander	8,502	70.22%	3,581	29.58%	20	0.17%	4	0.03%	4,921	40.66%	12,107
Alleghany	2,589	56.08%	2,013	43.60%	13	0.28%	2	0.04%	576	12.48%	4,617
Anson	3,719	42.45%	5,015	57.25%	11	0.13%	15	0.17%	-1,296	-14.80%	8,760
Ashe	6,611	62.10%	4,009	37.66%	22	0.21%	3	0.03%	2,602	24.44%	10,645
Avery	4,702	79.88%	1,159	19.69%	17	0.29%	8	0.14%	3,543	60.19%	5,886
Beaufort	9,284	60.66%	5,987	39.12%	27	0.18%	6	0.04%	3,297	21.54%	15,304
Bertie	2,879	41.91%	3,953	57.54%	29	0.42%	9	0.13%	-1,074	-15.63%	6,870
Bladen	4,701	48.07%	5,064	51.78%	12	0.12%	2	0.02%	-363	-3.71%	9,779
Brunswick	9,673	58.67%	6,774	41.08%	35	0.21%	6	0.04%	2,899	17.59%	16,488
Buncombe	37,698	61.62%	23,337	38.14%	122	0.20%	26	0.04%	14,361	23.48%	61,183
Burke	18,766	64.32%	10,353	35.48%	51	0.17%	8	0.03%	8,413	28.84%	29,178
Cabarrus	22,528	72.54%	8,477	27.29%	43	0.14%	10	0.03%	14,051	45.25%	31,058
Caldwell	17,024	69.79%	7,311	29.97%	50	0.20%	9	0.04%	9,713	39.82%	24,394
Camden	1,282	54.25%	1,075	45.49%	5	0.21%	1	0.04%	207	8.76%	2,363
Carteret	11,637	66.28%	5,882	33.50%	35	0.20%	3	0.02%	5,755	32.78%	17,557
Caswell	3,992	48.84%	4,157	50.86%	19	0.23%	6	0.07%	-165	-2.02%	8,174
Catawba	31,476	72.78%	11,700	27.05%	61	0.14%	13	0.03%	19,776	45.73%	43,250
Chatham	8,595	53.39%	7,458	46.33%	39	0.24%	7	0.04%	1,137	7.06%	16,099
Cherokee	4,894	63.73%	2,776	36.15%	8	0.10%	1	0.01%	2,118	27.58%	7,679
Chowan	2,171	55.41%	1,736	44.31%	9	0.23%	2	0.05%	435	11.10%	3,918
Clay	2,259	62.42%	1,340	37.03%	19	0.53%	1	0.03%	919	25.39%	3,619
Cleveland	17,095	62.23%	10,288	37.45%	82	0.30%	7	0.03%	6,807	24.78%	27,472
Columbus	9,150	51.11%	8,728	48.75%	20	0.11%	6	0.03%	422	2.36%	17,904
Craven	12,893	64.04%	7,186	35.69%	41	0.20%	14	0.07%	5,707	28.35%	20,134
Cumberland	31,602	58.18%	22,614	41.63%	89	0.16%	14	0.03%	8,988	16.55%	54,319
Currituck	2,885	63.24%	1,668	36.56%	8	0.18%	1	0.02%	1,217	26.68%	4,562
Dare	4,738	71.83%	1,839	27.88%	16	0.24%	3	0.05%	2,899	43.95%	6,596
Davidson	30,471	72.55%	11,469	27.31%	54	0.13%	7	0.02%	19,002	45.24%	42,001
Davie	8,201	73.72%	2,911	26.17%	12	0.11%	1	0.01%	5,290	47.55%	11,125
Duplin	7,708	52.96%	6,830	46.93%	13	0.09%	4	0.03%	878	6.03%	14,555
Durham	29,185	47.39%	32,244	52.36%	134	0.22%	21	0.03%	-3,059	-4.97%	61,584
Edgecombe	9,635	47.66%	10,545	52.16%	24	0.12%	12	0.06%	-910	-4.50%	20,216
Forsyth	59,208	61.54%	36,814	38.26%	174	0.18%	15	0.02%	22,394	23.28%	96,211
Franklin	5,984	55.57%	4,766	44.26%	10	0.09%	8	0.07%	1,218	11.31%	10,768
Gaston	39,167	73.36%	14,142	26.49%	70	0.13%	13	0.02%	25,025	46.87%	53,392
Gates	1,694	43.10%	2,225	56.62%	7	0.18%	4	0.10%	-531	-13.52%	3,930
Graham	2,514	62.63%	1,494	37.22%	4	0.10%	2	0.05%	1,020	25.41%	4,014
Granville	6,302	54.42%	5,217	45.05%	58	0.50%	3	0.03%	1,085	9.37%	11,580
Greene	3,195	53.47%	2,772	46.39%	8	0.13%	0	0.00%	423	7.08%	5,975
Guilford	73,096	61.25%	46,027	38.57%	186	0.16%	27	0.02%	27,069	22.68%	119,336
Halifax	8,832	48.65%	9,278	51.11%	30	0.17%	13	0.07%	-446	-2.46%	18,153
Harnett	11,198	61.11%	7,106	38.78%	15	0.08%	4	0.02%	4,092	22.33%	18,323
Haywood	10,146	55.96%	7,958	43.89%	24	0.13%	3	0.02%	2,188	12.07%	18,131
Henderson	19,369	72.55%	7,222	27.05%	80	0.30%	26	0.10%	12,147	45.50%	26,697
Hertford	3,176	41.27%	4,498	58.45%	16	0.21%	5	0.06%	-1,322	-17.18%	7,695
Hoke	2,449	43.14%	3,214	56.61%	11	0.19%	3	0.05%	-765	-13.47%	5,677
Hyde	1,195	54.27%	1,004	45.59%	3	0.14%	0	0.00%	191	8.68%	2,202
Iredell	23,641	70.14%	9,999	29.67%	55	0.16%	9	0.03%	13,642	40.47%	33,704
Jackson	5,582	55.97%	4,367	43.78%	22	0.22%	3	0.03%	1,215	12.19%	9,974
Johnston	16,210	67.32%	7,833	32.53%	24	0.10%	13	0.05%	8,377	34.79%	24,080
Jones	2,062	50.30%	2,025	49.40%	8	0.20%	4	0.10%	37	0.90%	4,099
Lee	8,198	67.47%	3,925	32.30%	25	0.21%	3	0.02%	4,273	35.17%	12,151
Lenoir	13,321	60.79%	8,556	39.04%	27	0.12%	10	0.05%	4,765	21.75%	21,914
Lincoln	12,621	67.64%	5,996	32.13%	38	0.20%	4	0.02%	6,625	35.51%	18,659
Macon	6,661	64.95%	3,570	34.81%	21	0.20%	4	0.04%	3,091	30.14%	10,256
Madison	3,666	54.81%	2,988	44.67%	10	0.15%	25	0.37%	678	10.14%	6,689
Martin	4,266	52.32%	3,870	47.47%	12	0.15%	5	0.06%	396	4.85%	8,153
McDowell	7,639	65.09%	4,076	34.73%	17	0.14%	4	0.03%	3,563	30.36%	11,736
Mecklenburg	106,754	62.67%	63,190	37.10%	337	0.20%	56	0.03%	43,564	25.57%	170,337
Mitchell	4,737	78.51%	1,286	21.31%	10	0.17%	1	0.02%	3,451	57.20%	6,034
Montgomery	5,109	57.07%	3,831	42.79%	6	0.07%	6	0.07%	1,278	14.28%	8,952
Moore	14,681	67.40%	7,063	32.43%	30	0.14%	8	0.04%	7,618	34.97%	21,782
Nash	17,295	66.73%	8,588	33.14%	23	0.09%	11	0.04%	8,707	33.59%	25,917
New Hanover	23,771	65.21%	12,591	34.54%	75	0.21%	15	0.04%	11,180	30.67%	36,452
Northampton	3,198	38.39%	5,094	61.15%	24	0.29%	14	0.17%	-1,896	-22.76%	8,330
Onslow	13,928	70.75%	5,713	29.02%	34	0.17%	12	0.06%	8,215	41.73%	19,687
Orange	15,585	42.96%	20,564	56.69%	108	0.30%	20	0.06%	-4,979	-13.73%	36,277
Pamlico	2,554	54.14%	2,152	45.62%	8	0.17%	3	0.06%	402	8.52%	4,717
Pasquotank	4,646	54.58%	3,854	45.27%	6	0.07%	7	0.08%	792	9.31%	8,513
Pender	5,079	53.73%	4,354	46.06%	16	0.17%	4	0.04%	725	7.67%	9,453
Perquimans	1,939	57.28%	1,441	42.57%	4	0.12%	1	0.03%	498	14.71%	3,385
Person	5,854	62.30%	3,528	37.54%	11	0.12%	4	0.04%	2,326	24.76%	9,397
Pitt	18,983	58.36%	13,481	41.45%	48	0.15%	14	0.04%	5,502	16.91%	32,526
Polk	4,046	64.73%	2,169	34.70%	34	0.54%	2	0.03%	1,877	30.03%	6,251
Randolph	25,759	77.36%	7,511	22.56%	23	0.07%	6	0.02%	18,248	54.80%	33,299
Richmond	6,807	47.50%	7,494	52.30%	26	0.18%	3	0.02%	-687	-4.80%	14,330
Robeson	12,947	45.76%	15,257	53.93%	56	0.20%	31	0.11%	-2,310	-8.17%	28,291
Rockingham	17,895	62.70%	10,605	37.16%	32	0.11%	7	0.02%	7,290	25.54%	28,539
Rowan	25,207	70.20%	10,643	29.64%	52	0.14%	5	0.01%	14,564	40.56%	35,907
Rutherford	11,369	62.23%	6,862	37.56%	33	0.18%	4	0.02%	4,507	24.67%	18,268
Sampson	10,665	53.87%	9,115	46.04%	13	0.07%	3	0.02%	1,550	7.83%	19,796
Scotland	4,077	50.23%	4,028	49.62%	11	0.14%	1	0.01%	49	0.61%	8,117
Stanly	13,116	68.00%	6,138	31.82%	29	0.15%	6	0.03%	6,978	36.18%	19,289
Stokes	9,515	65.63%	4,950	34.14%	28	0.19%	5	0.03%	4,565	31.49%	14,498
Surry	13,340	64.88%	7,188	34.96%	26	0.13%	8	0.04%	6,152	29.92%	20,562
Swain	2,012	50.02%	2,000	49.73%	9	0.22%	1	0.02%	12	0.29%	4,022
Transylvania	6,956	64.91%	3,733	34.83%	25	0.23%	3	0.03%	3,223	30.08%	10,717
Tyrrell	774	48.89%	807	50.98%	1	0.06%	1	0.06%	-33	-2.09%	1,583
Union	16,885	70.45%	7,048	29.41%	27	0.11%	8	0.03%	9,837	41.04%	23,968
Vance	6,836	53.68%	5,880	46.18%	15	0.12%	3	0.02%	956	7.50%	12,734
Wake	81,251	61.61%	50,323	38.16%	267	0.20%	30	0.02%	30,928	23.45%	131,871
Warren	2,664	40.25%	3,946	59.63%	3	0.05%	5	0.08%	-1,282	-19.38%	6,618
Washington	2,731	46.67%	3,114	53.21%	7	0.12%	0	0.00%	-383	-6.54%	5,852
Watauga	9,370	64.27%	5,163	35.41%	41	0.28%	5	0.03%	4,207	28.86%	14,579
Wayne	17,961	64.13%	10,011	35.74%	30	0.11%	6	0.02%	7,950	28.39%	28,008
Wilkes	18,670	73.03%	6,852	26.80%	40	0.16%	2	0.01%	11,818	46.23%	25,564
Wilson	12,243	59.31%	8,343	40.42%	40	0.19%	17	0.08%	3,900	18.89%	20,643
Yadkin	8,976	74.37%	3,075	25.48%	14	0.12%	5	0.04%	5,901	48.89%	12,070
Yancey	4,296	53.96%	3,651	45.86%	9	0.11%	5	0.06%	645	8.10%	7,961
Totals	1,346,481	61.90%	824,287	37.89%	3,794	0.17%	799	0.04%	522,194	24.01%	2,175,361

==== Counties that flipped from Democratic to Republican ====
- Alleghany
- Brunswick
- Camden
- Chatham
- Chowan
- Cleveland
- Columbus
- Cumberland
- Currituck
- Duplin
- Franklin
- Granville
- Greene
- Harnett
- Haywood
- Hyde
- Jackson
- Jones
- Lee
- Madison
- Martin
- Montgomery
- Pamlico
- Pasquotank
- Pender
- Perquimans
- Person
- Rockingham
- Sampson
- Scotland
- Swain
- Union
- Vance
- Yancey

== Works cited ==
- Black, Earl; Black, Merle (1992). The Vital South: How Presidents Are Elected. Harvard University Press. ISBN 0674941306.
- Ranney, Austin, ed. (1985). The American Elections of 1984. Duke University Press. ISBN 0822302306.
