= Amis-Bragg House =

Historic house in North Carolina, United States

- U.S. National Register of Historic Places
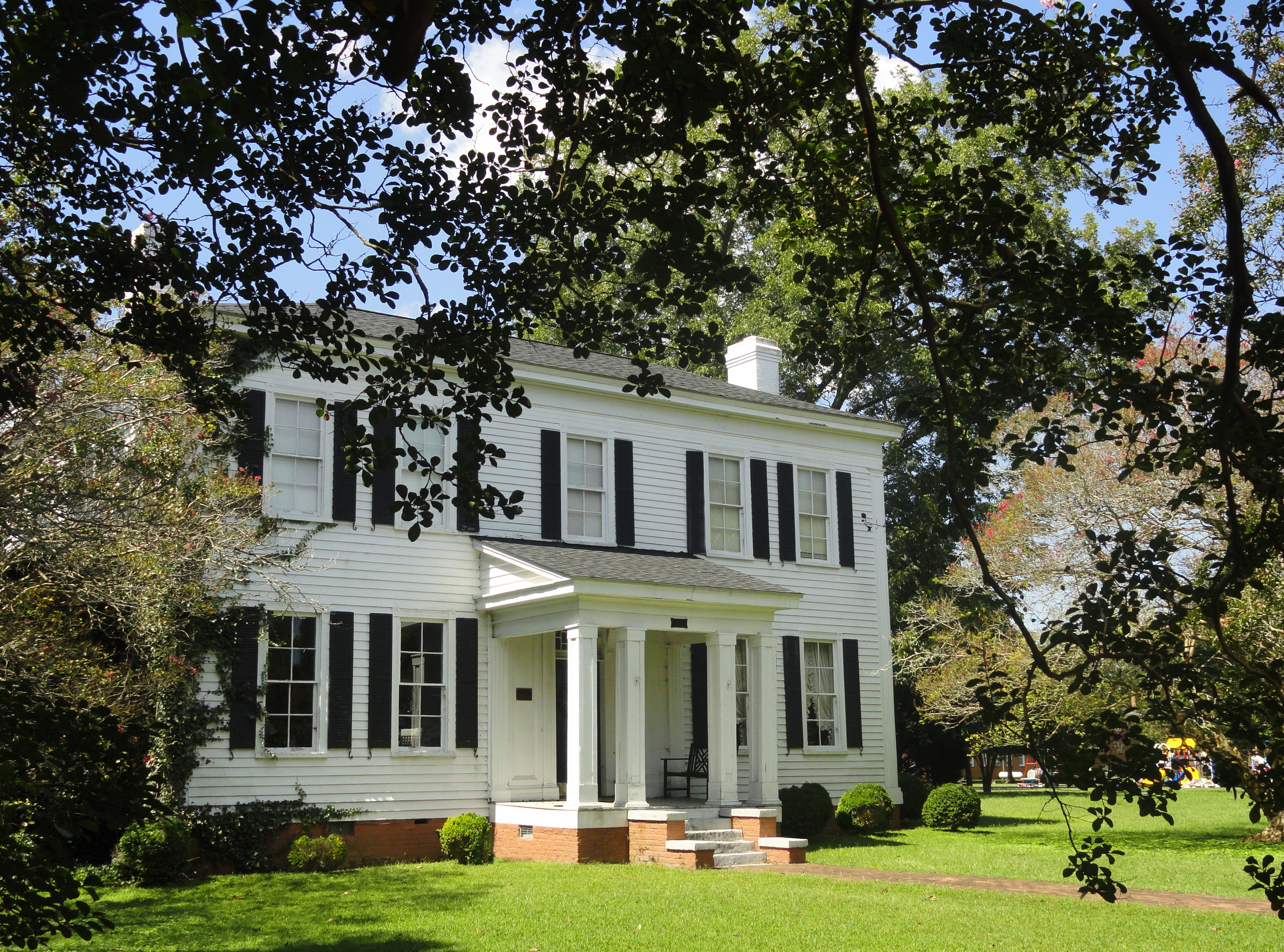
- Amis-Bragg House

- Location within North Carolina Location within the United States
- Location: 203 Thomas Bragg Dr., Jackson, North Carolina
- Coordinates: 36°23′29″N 77°25′14″W
- Area: less than one acre
- Built: c. 1840
- Built by: Thomas Bragg, Sr.,
- Architectural style: Greek Revival
- NRHP reference No.: 03000857
- Added to NRHP: August 28, 2003

Amis-Bragg House is a historic home located at Jackson, Northampton County, North Carolina. It was built about 1840, and is a two-story, five-bay, single-pile Greek Revival style frame house with a two-story ell and one-story kitchen wing. It has a hipped roof and interior end chimneys. It was the home of Thomas Bragg Jr. (1810-1872), North Carolina governor and member of the United States Senate, who purchased the house in 1843 and lived here until 1855.

It was listed on the National Register of Historic Places in 2003.
