= Jackson, North Carolina =

- Town
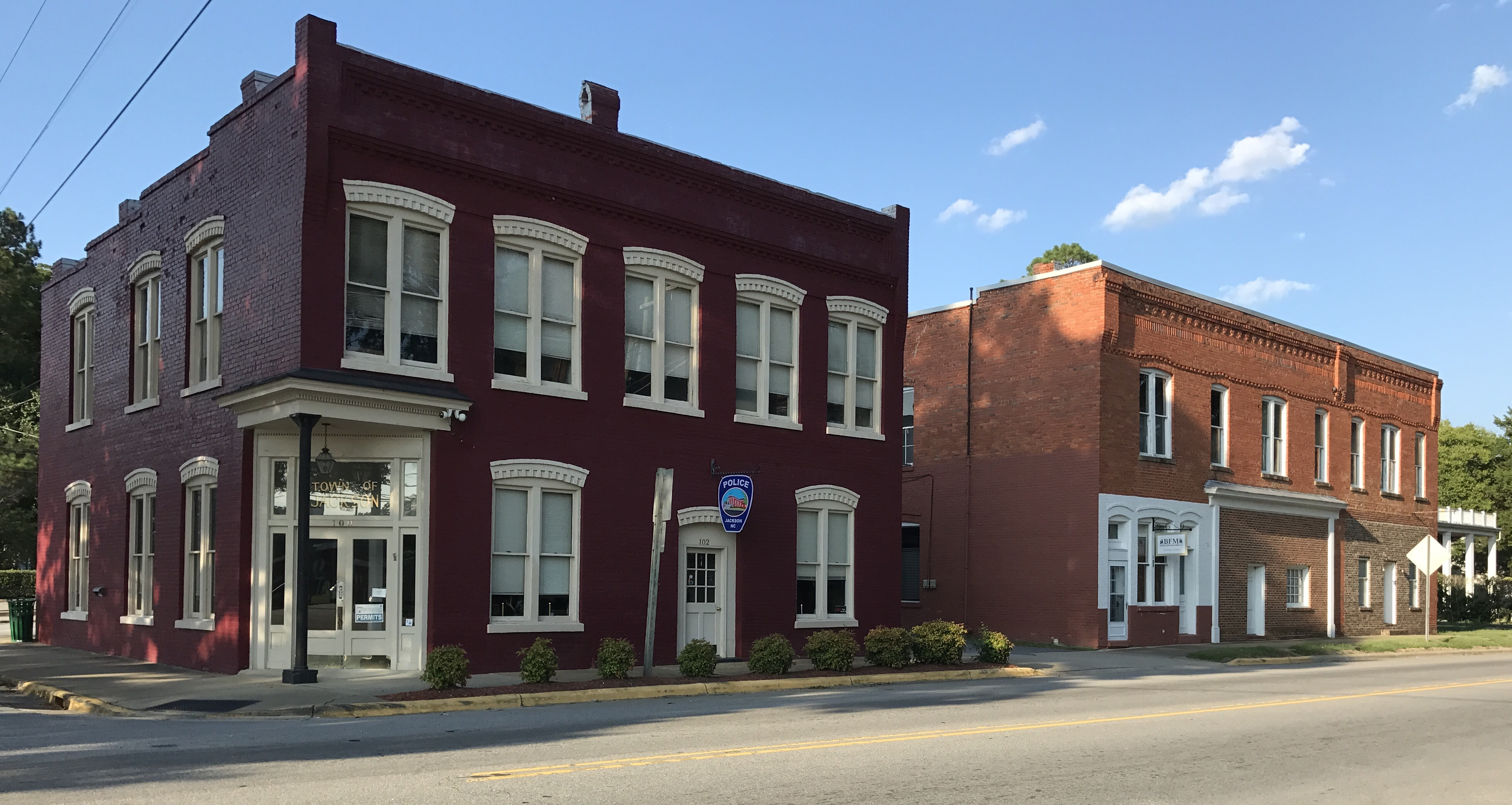
- Jackson Town Hall on West Jefferson Street

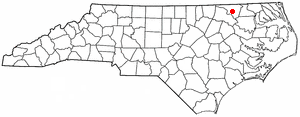
- Location of Jackson, North Carolina
- Coordinates: 36°23′24″N 77°25′10″W
- Country: United States
- State: North Carolina
- County: Northampton

Area
  - Total: 1.01 sq mi (2.62 km^{2})
  - Land: 1.01 sq mi (2.62 km^{2})
  - Water: 0 sq mi (0.00 km^{2})
- Elevation: 108 ft (33 m)

Population (2020)
  - Total: 430
  - Density: 425.8/sq mi (164.39/km^{2})
- Time zone: UTC-5 (Eastern (EST))
  - Summer (DST): UTC-4 (EDT)
- ZIP code: 27845
- Area code: 252
- FIPS code: 37-34000
- GNIS feature ID: 2405900
- Website: https://www.historicjacksonnc.com/

Jackson is a town in Northampton County, North Carolina, United States. As of the 2020 census, Jackson had a population of 430. It is the county seat of Northampton County.

Jackson is part of the Roanoke Rapids, North Carolina Micropolitan Statistical Area.

== History ==
The town of Jackson traces its origins to the creation of Northampton County in 1741 by the Colonial Assembly of North Carolina. The location was chosen to be a central site for the courthouse. Initially known as Northampton Courthouse, the area began to develop around the courthouse square. By 1762, Jeptha Atherton had purchased the courthouse lands, and by 1798, the area had a tavern and a storehouse.

In 1826, the town was renamed Jackson in honour of General Andrew Jackson, a hero of the Battle of New Orleans and later President of the United States. Jackson became a political hub with intense debates between Whigs and Democrats. In 1825, General Lafayette, a Revolutionary War hero, visited the town. By the early 19th century, horse racing and breeding brought national attention to Northampton County. The famous thoroughbred sire Sir Archie was brought to Mowfield Plantation near Jackson in 1816.

The Amis-Bragg House, Church of the Saviour and Cemetery, Jackson Historic District, Mowfield, Northampton County Courthouse Square, and Verona are listed on the National Register of Historic Places.

== Geography ==
According to the United States Census Bureau, the town has a total area of 1.0 square mile (2.6 km^{2}), all land.

=== Climate ===
Climate data for Jackson, North Carolina (1991–2020 normals, extremes 1948–present)
Month	Jan	Feb	Mar	Apr	May	Jun	Jul	Aug	Sep	Oct	Nov	Dec	Year
Record high °F (°C)	80 (27)	84 (29)	92 (33)	97 (36)	98 (37)	102 (39)	105 (41)	105 (41)	105 (41)	101 (38)	86 (30)	81 (27)	105 (41)
Mean daily maximum °F (°C)	50.1 (10.1)	53.6 (12.0)	61.2 (16.2)	71.3 (21.8)	78.1 (25.6)	85.7 (29.8)	89.2 (31.8)	87.3 (30.7)	81.6 (27.6)	71.5 (21.9)	61.3 (16.3)	53.3 (11.8)	70.3 (21.3)
Daily mean °F (°C)	39.5 (4.2)	41.9 (5.5)	48.6 (9.2)	58.0 (14.4)	66.4 (19.1)	74.7 (23.7)	78.7 (25.9)	77.0 (25.0)	71.0 (21.7)	59.7 (15.4)	49.6 (9.8)	42.6 (5.9)	59.0 (15.0)
Mean daily minimum °F (°C)	28.8 (−1.8)	30.2 (−1.0)	35.9 (2.2)	44.8 (7.1)	54.6 (12.6)	63.7 (17.6)	68.1 (20.1)	66.6 (19.2)	60.5 (15.8)	47.9 (8.8)	38.0 (3.3)	31.8 (−0.1)	47.6 (8.7)
Record low °F (°C)	−8 (−22)	−4 (−20)	12 (−11)	19 (−7)	31 (−1)	43 (6)	50 (10)	44 (7)	39 (4)	22 (−6)	15 (−9)	−1 (−18)	−8 (−22)
Average precipitation inches (mm)	3.74 (95)	2.89 (73)	4.39 (112)	3.64 (92)	4.02 (102)	4.74 (120)	5.99 (152)	5.16 (131)	5.23 (133)	3.82 (97)	3.56 (90)	3.71 (94)	50.89 (1,293)
Average snowfall inches (cm)	2.8 (7.1)	0.8 (2.0)	0.2 (0.51)	0.0 (0.0)	0.0 (0.0)	0.0 (0.0)	0.0 (0.0)	0.0 (0.0)	0.0 (0.0)	0.0 (0.0)	0.1 (0.25)	1.1 (2.8)	5.0 (13)
Average precipitation days (≥ 0.01 in)	9.5	8.2	9.6	8.2	9.2	9.2	9.8	8.9	8.3	6.6	7.6	8.7	103.8
Average snowy days (≥ 0.1 in)	1.2	0.9	0.2	0.0	0.0	0.0	0.0	0.0	0.0	0.0	0.1	0.6	3.0
Source: NOAA

== Demographics ==
Historical population
Census	Pop.	Note	%±
1850	300		—
1870	181		—
1880	255		40.9%
1890	750		194.1%
1900	441		−41.2%
1910	527		19.5%
1920	579		9.9%
1930	677		16.9%
1940	758		12.0%
1950	853		12.5%
1960	765		−10.3%
1970	762		−0.4%
1980	720		−5.5%
1990	592		−17.8%
2000	695		17.4%
2010	513		−26.2%
2020	430		−16.2%
U.S. Decennial Census

=== 2020 census ===
Jackson racial composition
Race	Number	Percentage
White (non-Hispanic)	236	54.88%
Black or African American (non-Hispanic)	153	35.58%
Native American	2	0.47%
Asian	6	1.4%
Other/Mixed	26	6.05%
Hispanic or Latino	7	1.63%

As of the 2020 United States census, there were 430 people, 245 households, and 142 families residing in the town.

=== 2000 census ===
As of the census of 2000, there were 695 people, 218 households, and 148 families residing in the town. The population density was 683.8 inhabitants per square mile (264.0/km^{2}). There were 243 housing units at an average density of 239.1 per square mile (92.3/km^{2}). The racial makeup of the town was 51.94% White, 47.63% African American, 0.14% Asian, 0.14% from other races, and 0.14% from two or more races. Hispanic or Latino of any race were 0.29% of the population.

There were 218 households, out of which 27.5% had children under the age of 18 living with them, 48.2% were married couples living together, 15.6% had a female householder with no husband present, and 31.7% were non-families. 28.9% of all households were made up of individuals, and 18.3% had someone living alone who was 65 years of age or older. The average household size was 2.41 and the average family size was 2.97.

In the town, the population was spread out, with 18.4% under the age of 18, 7.2% from 18 to 24, 24.5% from 25 to 44, 22.3% from 45 to 64, and 27.6% who were 65 years of age or older. The median age was 45 years. For every 100 females, there were 97.4 males. For every 100 females age 18 and over, there were 96.2 males.

The median income for a household in the town was $29,375, and the median income for a family was $34,000. Males had a median income of $27,917 versus $18,875 for females. The per capita income for the town was $14,588. About 18.6% of families and 19.8% of the population were below the poverty line, including 31.3% of those under age 18 and 10.8% of those age 65 or over.

== Education ==
The elementary school serving Jackson is Central Elementary School. CES is the newest school in Northampton County; it opened it doors for the 2006-2007 school year. It combined Seaboard Coates Elementary and Jackson Eastside Elementary schools.

Also housed in Jackson is the Central Services building for Northampton County Schools. Northampton County Schools is the local educational agency for the district. The system includes seven schools.

== Notable people ==
- W. E. Bradley, member of the Alaska Senate
- Bobby Evans, professional baseball executive, served as general manager of the San Francisco Giants from 2015 to 2018
