= Northampton County Courthouse Square =

- U.S. National Register of Historic Places
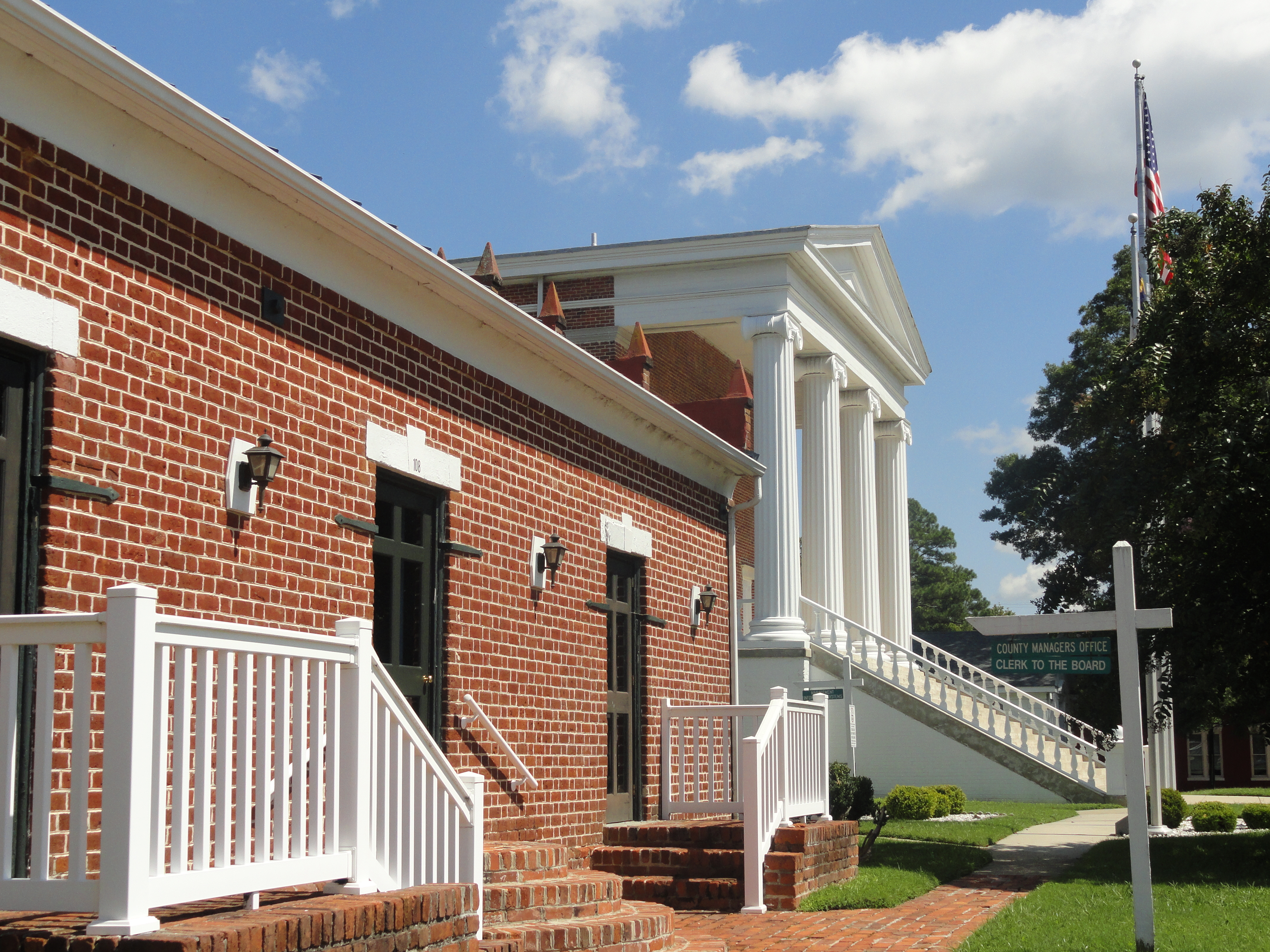

- Location within North Carolina Location within the United States
- Location: Jefferson St. between Atherton and Brown Sts., Jackson, North Carolina
- Coordinates: 36°23′24″N 77°25′11″W
- Area: 2.5 acres (1.0 ha)
- Built: 1831, 1858, 1900
- Architect: Spencer, Abraham; Burgwyn, H.K.
- Architectural style: Greek Revival
- NRHP reference No.: 77001006
- Added to NRHP: April 11, 1977

Northampton County Courthouse Square is a historic courthouse complex located at Jackson, Northampton County, North Carolina. The courthouse was built in 1858, and is a tall one-story, three bay by three bay, Greek Revival style temple-form brick building. It sits on a raised basement and features an imposing prostyle tetrastyle portico with great fluted Ionic order columns. The building was remodeled and a two-story rear addition built in 1939 by the Works Progress Administration. The clerk's and register's office was built in 1831, and is a one-story brick building with stepped parapet gable ends and a plaster cornice. A later clerk's office was built in 1900 between the 1831 building and the courthouse.

It was listed on the National Register of Historic Places in 1977.

It was built on land previously developed by Jeptha Atherton in 1762, who allowed the use of a building for county court meetings. The Atherton plantation had a large stables and specialized in horse breeding. There was also a gristmill, a tavern, and a store.
