= Northampton County, North Carolina =

County in North Carolina, United States

- County
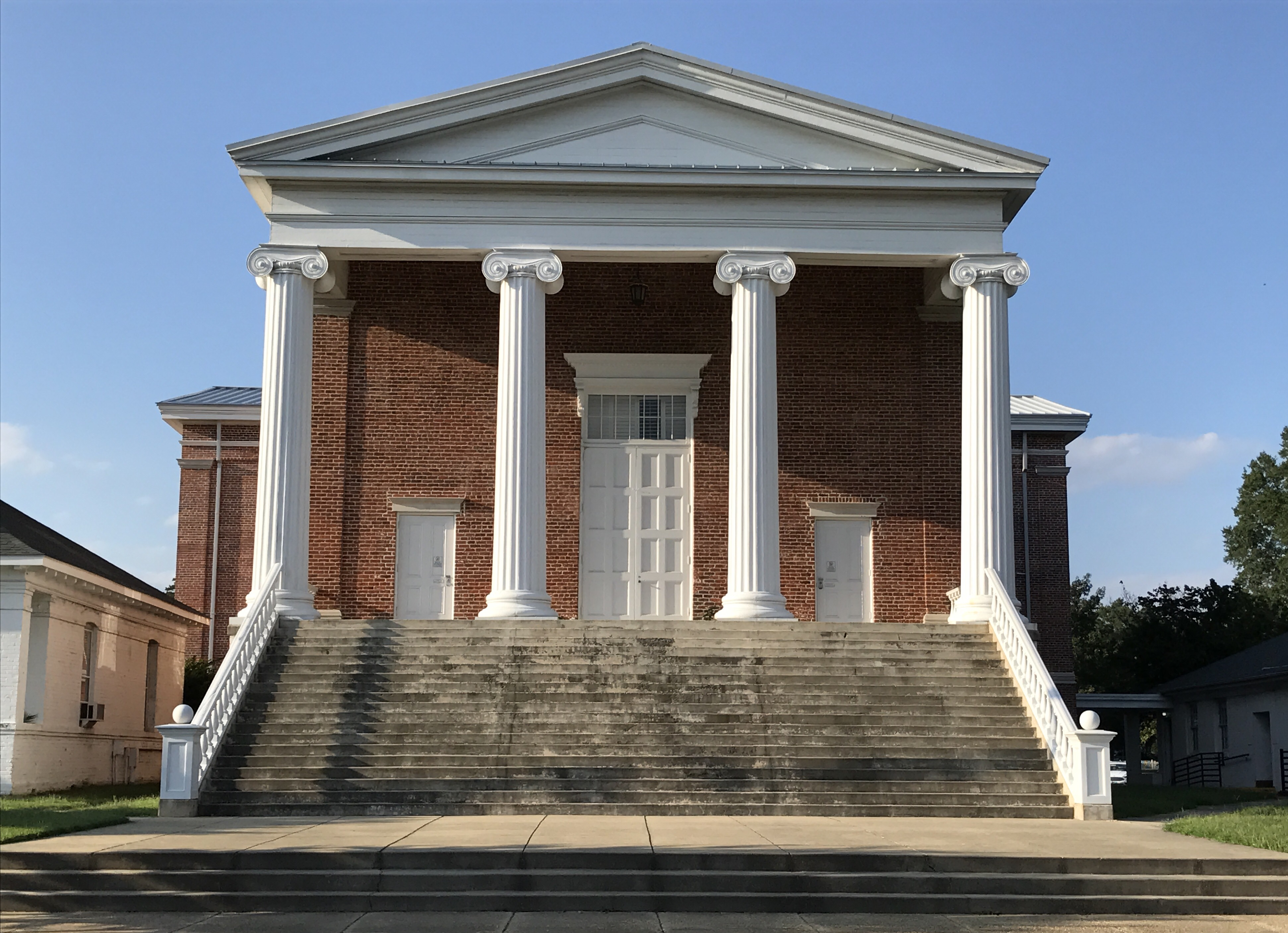
- Northampton County Courthouse in Jackson

- Flag Seal Logo
- Motto(s): "Living is Easy" "Rich Tradition"
- Location within the U.S. state of North Carolina
- Coordinates: 36.42°N 77.40°W
- Country: United States
- State: North Carolina
- Founded: 1741
- Named for: James Compton, 5th Earl of Northampton
- Seat: Jackson
- Largest community: Gaston

Area
  - Total: 550.56 sq mi (1,425.9 km^{2})
  - Land: 536.70 sq mi (1,390.0 km^{2})
  - Water: 13.86 sq mi (35.9 km^{2}) 2.52%

Population (2020)
  - Total: 17,471
  - Estimate (2025): 16,491 ▼
  - Density: 32.553/sq mi (12.569/km^{2})
- Time zone: UTC−5 (Eastern)
  - Summer (DST): UTC−4 (EDT)
- Congressional district: 1st
- Website: www.northamptonnc.com

Northampton County (/nɔːrˈθæmptən/ nor-THAMP-tən) is a county located in the U.S. state of North Carolina. As of the 2020 census, the population was 17,471. Its county seat is Jackson. Northampton County is part of the Roanoke Rapids, NC Micropolitan Statistical Area, which is also included in the Rocky Mount-Wilson-Roanoke Rapids, NC Combined Statistical Area.

== History ==
The area was first organized under English colonial authority as the Albemarle Precinct. In 1729 part of Albemarle was split off to form Bertie Precinct. In 1739 all former precincts became counties. Northampton County was formed from part of Bertie County in 1741.

It was named for James Compton, 5th Earl of Northampton. In 1759 parts of Northampton County, Bertie County, and Chowan County were combined to form Hertford County.

In 1959, the county went to the U.S. Supreme Court to defend the use of a literacy test as a requirement to vote. In Lassiter v. Northampton County Board of Elections, the court held that, provided the tests were applied equally to all races and were not "merely a device to make racial discrimination easy," they were allowable. Congress subsequently prohibited use of such tests under the National Voting Rights Act of 1965.

== Geography ==
Interactive map of Northampton County

According to the U.S. Census Bureau, the county has a total area of 550.56 square miles (1,425.9 km^{2}), of which 536.70 square miles (1,390.0 km^{2}) is land and 13.86 square miles (35.9 km^{2}) (2.52%) is water.

=== State and local protected areas ===
- Lake Gaston Public Recreation Area (part)
- Roanoke Rapids Lake Day Use Area (part)
- Upper Roanoke River Wetlands Game Land (part)

=== Major water bodies ===
- Bull Neck Swamp
- Corduroy Swamp
- Doolittle Millpond
- Gumberry Swamp
- Lake Gaston
- Meherrin River
- Occoneechee Creek
- Paddys Delight Creek
- Potecasi Creek
- Ramsey Creek
- Roanoke Rapids Lake
- Roanoke River
- Taylors Millpond
- Urahaw Swamp

=== Adjacent counties ===
- Greensville County, Virginia - north
- Southampton County, Virginia - northeast
- Hertford County - east
- Bertie County - southeast
- Halifax County - southwest
- Warren County - northwest
- Brunswick County, Virginia - north-northwest

=== Major highways ===
- I-95
- US 158
- US 158 Byp. (bypass of Garysburg)
- US 258
- US 301
- NC 35
- NC 46
- NC 48
- NC 186
- NC 305
- NC 308
- NC 561

== Demographics ==
Historical population
| Census | Pop. | Note | %± |
|---|---|---|---|
| 1790 | 9,992 | | — |
| 1800 | 12,353 | | 23.6% |
| 1810 | 13,082 | | 5.9% |
| 1820 | 13,242 | | 1.2% |
| 1830 | 13,391 | | 1.1% |
| 1840 | 13,369 | | −0.2% |
| 1850 | 13,335 | | −0.3% |
| 1860 | 13,372 | | 0.3% |
| 1870 | 14,749 | | 10.3% |
| 1880 | 20,032 | | 35.8% |
| 1890 | 21,242 | | 6.0% |
| 1900 | 21,150 | | −0.4% |
| 1910 | 22,323 | | 5.5% |
| 1920 | 23,184 | | 3.9% |
| 1930 | 27,161 | | 17.2% |
| 1940 | 28,299 | | 4.2% |
| 1950 | 28,432 | | 0.5% |
| 1960 | 26,811 | | −5.7% |
| 1970 | 24,009 | | −10.5% |
| 1980 | 22,584 | | −5.9% |
| 1990 | 20,798 | | −7.9% |
| 2000 | 22,086 | | 6.2% |
| 2010 | 22,099 | | 0.1% |
| 2020 | 17,471 | | −20.9% |
| 2025 (est.) | 16,491 | ▼ | −5.6% |
U.S. Decennial Census; 1790–1960 1900–1990; 1990–2000 2010 2020

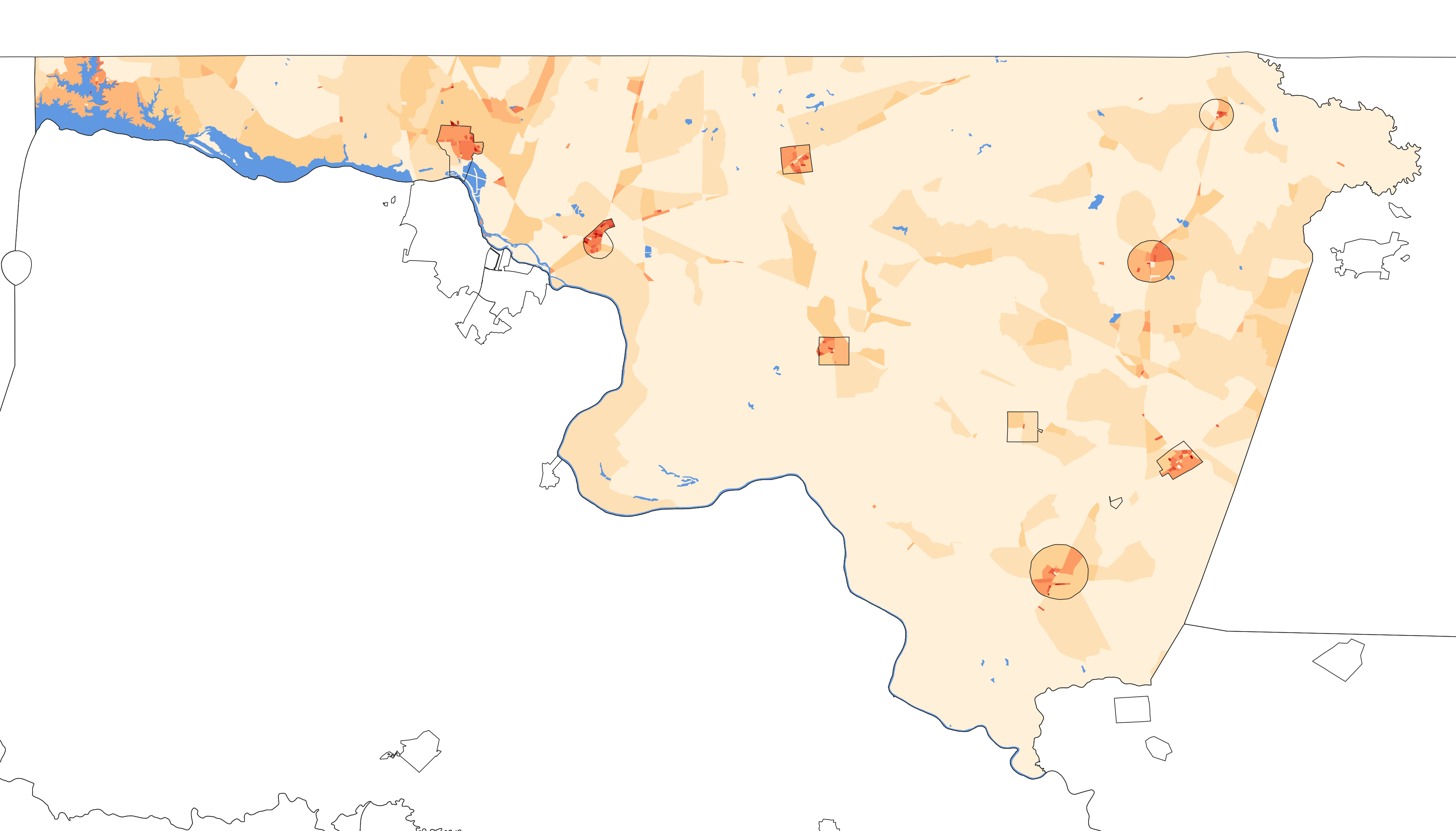
2020 population density of Northampton County NC by census block

=== 2020 census ===
Northampton County, North Carolina – Racial and ethnic composition Note: the US Census treats Hispanic/Latino as an ethnic category. This table excludes Latinos from the racial categories and assigns them to a separate category. Hispanics/Latinos may be of any race.
| Race / Ethnicity (NH = Non-Hispanic) | Pop 1980 | Pop 1990 | Pop 2000 | Pop 2010 | Pop 2020 | % 1980 | % 1990 | % 2000 | % 2010 | % 2020 |
|---|---|---|---|---|---|---|---|---|---|---|
| White alone (NH) | 8,772 | 8,371 | 24,269 | 8,596 | 6,835 | 38.84% | 40.25% | 42.30% | 38.90% | 39.12% |
| Black or African American alone (NH) | 13,486 | 12,257 | 30,018 | 12,847 | 9,649 | 59.71% | 58.93% | 52.32% | 58.13% | 55.23% |
| Native American or Alaska Native alone (NH) | 34 | 40 | 1,778 | 90 | 43 | 0.15% | 0.19% | 3.10% | 0.41% | 0.25% |
| Asian alone (NH) | 9 | 11 | 310 | 38 | 27 | 0.04% | 0.05% | 0.54% | 0.17% | 0.15% |
| Native Hawaiian or Pacific Islander alone (NH) | x | x | 6 | 1 | 4 | x | x | 0.01% | 0.00% | 0.02% |
| Other race alone (NH) | 4 | 3 | 58 | 30 | 76 | 0.02% | 0.01% | 0.10% | 0.14% | 0.44% |
| Mixed race or Multiracial (NH) | x | x | 352 | 192 | 484 | x | x | 0.61% | 0.87% | 2.77% |
| Hispanic or Latino (any race) | 279 | 116 | 579 | 305 | 353 | 1.24% | 0.56% | 1.01% | 1.38% | 2.02% |
| Total | 22,584 | 20,798 | 57,370 | 22,099 | 17,471 | 100.00% | 100.00% | 100.00% | 100.00% | 100.00% |

As of the 2020 census, the county had a population of 17,471. The median age was 52.1 years, with 17.7% of residents under the age of 18 and 27.6% of residents 65 years of age or older. For every 100 females there were 90.6 males, and for every 100 females age 18 and over there were 86.3 males age 18 and over.

The racial makeup of the county was 39.6% White, 55.5% Black or African American, 0.3% American Indian and Alaska Native, 0.2% Asian, <0.1% Native Hawaiian and Pacific Islander, 1.2% from some other race, and 3.3% from two or more races. Hispanic or Latino residents of any race comprised 2.0% of the population.

11.6% of residents lived in urban areas, while 88.4% lived in rural areas.

There were 7,801 households in the county, of which 22.5% had children under the age of 18 living in them. Of all households, 38.2% were married-couple households, 20.3% were households with a male householder and no spouse or partner present, and 36.2% were households with a female householder and no spouse or partner present. About 34.9% of all households were made up of individuals and 17.9% had someone living alone who was 65 years of age or older; 5,610 of the households were families.

There were 10,570 housing units, of which 26.2% were vacant. Among occupied housing units, 71.7% were owner-occupied and 28.3% were renter-occupied. The homeowner vacancy rate was 1.4% and the rental vacancy rate was 6.0%.

=== 2010 census ===
At the 2010 census, there were 22,099 people living in the county; 58.4% were Black or African American, 39.2% White, 0.5% Native American, 0.2% Asian, 0.8% of some other race and 1.0% of two or more races. 1.4% were Hispanic or Latino (of any race).

=== 2000 census ===
At the 2000 census, there were 22,086 people, 8,691 households, and 5,953 families living in the county. The population density was 41 people per square mile (16 people/km^{2}). There were 10,455 housing units at an average density of 20 units per square mile (7.7 units/km^{2}). The racial makeup of the county was 59.43% Black or African American, 39.09% White, 0.32% Native American, 0.09% Asian, 0.05% Pacific Islander, 0.39% from other races, and 0.63% from two or more races. 0.73% of the population were Hispanic or Latino of any race.

There were 8,691 households, out of which 27.70% had children under the age of 18 living with them, 45.50% were married couples living together, 18.30% had a female householder with no husband present, and 31.50% were non-families. 28.40% of all households were made up of individuals, and 13.20% had someone living alone who was 65 years of age or older. The average household size was 2.44 and the average family size was 2.99.

In the county, the population was spread out, with 24.30% under the age of 18, 6.90% from 18 to 24, 26.50% from 25 to 44, 24.90% from 45 to 64, and 17.40% who were 65 years of age or older. The median age was 40 years. For every 100 females there were 92.00 males. For every 100 females age 18 and over, there were 88.60 males.

The median income for a household in the county was $26,652, and the median income for a family was $34,648. Males had a median income of $27,970 versus $21,183 for females. The per capita income for the county was $15,413. About 17.00% of families and 21.30% of the population were below the poverty line, including 29.80% of those under age 18 and 21.50% of those age 65 or over.

== Government and politics ==
Northampton County is a member of the regional Upper Coastal Plain Council of Governments. Northampton is a traditionally Democratic county, being one of only two counties in the state won by George McGovern during his 1972 landslide loss. Apart from two counties in South Texas, (Note: The South Texas counties are Jim Hogg and Brooks) Northampton County is the only county in the United States to vote Democratic in every presidential election over the past century; the last Democratic candidate to lose the county was William Jennings Bryan in 1896. Apart from Hubert Humphrey and McGovern who received just over 51 percent, every Democratic nominee in the past century has received at least 55 percent of the county's vote. Northampton County has the longest ongoing Democratic voting streak in the United States after Starr County, Texas flipped Republican in 2024.

United States presidential election results for Northampton County, North Carolina
| Year | Republican | | Democratic | | Third party(ies) | |
| Year | No. | % | No. | % | No. | % |
|---|---|---|---|---|---|---|
| 1912 | 57 | 3.29% | 1,625 | 93.66% | 53 | 3.05% |
| 1916 | 45 | 2.88% | 1,518 | 97.12% | 0 | 0.00% |
| 1920 | 165 | 6.68% | 2,305 | 93.32% | 0 | 0.00% |
| 1924 | 144 | 7.90% | 1,662 | 91.17% | 17 | 0.93% |
| 1928 | 456 | 20.93% | 1,723 | 79.07% | 0 | 0.00% |
| 1932 | 147 | 4.33% | 3,243 | 95.47% | 7 | 0.21% |
| 1936 | 109 | 2.80% | 3,785 | 97.20% | 0 | 0.00% |
| 1940 | 105 | 2.67% | 3,826 | 97.33% | 0 | 0.00% |
| 1944 | 172 | 4.72% | 3,470 | 95.28% | 0 | 0.00% |
| 1948 | 179 | 4.59% | 3,591 | 92.17% | 126 | 3.23% |
| 1952 | 583 | 11.86% | 4,334 | 88.14% | 0 | 0.00% |
| 1956 | 747 | 14.97% | 4,242 | 85.03% | 0 | 0.00% |
| 1960 | 678 | 12.48% | 4,756 | 87.52% | 0 | 0.00% |
| 1964 | 1,187 | 19.04% | 5,046 | 80.96% | 0 | 0.00% |
| 1968 | 860 | 10.86% | 4,072 | 51.43% | 2,986 | 37.71% |
| 1972 | 2,997 | 47.71% | 3,233 | 51.46% | 52 | 0.83% |
| 1976 | 1,238 | 19.41% | 5,118 | 80.23% | 23 | 0.36% |
| 1980 | 1,847 | 26.92% | 4,933 | 71.90% | 81 | 1.18% |
| 1984 | 3,198 | 38.39% | 5,094 | 61.15% | 38 | 0.46% |
| 1988 | 2,415 | 34.34% | 4,599 | 65.39% | 19 | 0.27% |
| 1992 | 1,845 | 23.16% | 5,195 | 65.21% | 927 | 11.64% |
| 1996 | 1,881 | 25.08% | 5,207 | 69.44% | 411 | 5.48% |
| 2000 | 2,667 | 32.52% | 5,513 | 67.23% | 20 | 0.24% |
| 2004 | 3,176 | 36.21% | 5,584 | 63.67% | 10 | 0.11% |
| 2008 | 3,671 | 34.57% | 6,903 | 65.01% | 44 | 0.41% |
| 2012 | 3,483 | 32.38% | 7,232 | 67.24% | 41 | 0.38% |
| 2016 | 3,582 | 36.37% | 6,144 | 62.39% | 122 | 1.24% |
| 2020 | 3,989 | 39.46% | 6,069 | 60.03% | 52 | 0.51% |
| 2024 | 3,905 | 42.38% | 5,239 | 56.85% | 71 | 0.77% |

Northampton County is part of North Carolina's 1st congressional district, which has a Cook Partisan Voting Index of R+1 and has been represented by a Democratic Congressman since 1899. It is currently represented by Don Davis. In the North Carolina House of Representatives, Northampton County lies within the 27th district, which also covers Halifax County and is represented by Democrat Michael H. Wray. In the North Carolina Senate, Northampton County lies within the 3rd district, represented by Republican Bobby Hanig.

== Education ==
The North Carolina Department of Public Instruction rated the county school system as "low-performing" for the 2021–2022 school year. A school system is considered low-performing if a majority of its schools are. A school is considered low-performing if it receives a D or F, unless it has exceeded expectations. Each of the schools had "met expectations" except where specified otherwise.

The department's appraisal of the schools was as follows:

- Central Elementary: D
- Willis Hare Elementary: F
- Gaston STEM Leadership Academy: F
- Conway Middle: D (exceeded expectations)
- Northampton Early College: B (no expectations were set)
- Northampton County High School: D (did not meet expectations)
- Northampton Virtual Academy: N/A

== Communities ==
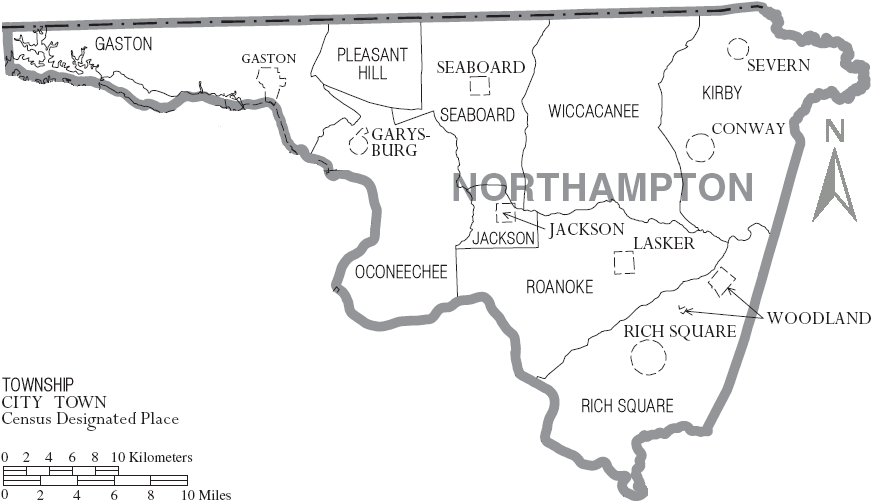
Map of Northampton County with municipal and township labels

=== Towns ===
- Conway
- Garysburg
- Gaston (largest community)
- Jackson (county seat)
- Lasker
- Rich Square
- Seaboard
- Severn
- Woodland

=== Census-designated place ===
- Milwaukee

=== Unincorporated communities ===
- Margarettsville
- Pleasant Hill
- Turners Crossroads

=== Townships ===
- Gaston
- Jackson
- Kirby
- Occoneechee
- Pleasant Hill
- Rich Square
- Roanoke
- Seaboard
- Wiccanee

== See also ==
- List of counties in North Carolina
- National Register of Historic Places listings in Northampton County, North Carolina
- Meherrin Indian Tribe, state-recognized tribe that resides in the county

== Works cited ==
- Footprints in Northampton : 1741-1776-1976. Rich Square: Northampton County Bicentennial Committee. 1976.
