= Portsmouth Subdivision =

CSX railroad line in Virginia and North Carolina

The Portsmouth Subdivision is a railroad line owned by CSX Transportation in Virginia and North Carolina. The line connects CSX's network with the port city of Portsmouth, Virginia. The Portsmouth Subdivision was historically operated by the Seaboard Air Line Railroad, a CSX predecessor.

== Route Description ==
The eastern terminus of the Portsmouth Subdivision is in its namesake city, Portsmouth, Virginia. From Portsmouth, it runs southwest to Garysburg, North Carolina on the Roanoke River, a distance of 75.8 miles. It passes through Franklin and Boykins and crosses into North Carolina just southwest of Branchville. In North Carolina, it continues southwest to Garysburg, North Carolina. The Portsmouth Subdivision currently terminates between Garysburg and the Roanoke River at a connection with line CSX's A Line (North End Subdivision).

When the Seaboard Air Line operated the line, the Portsmouth Subdivision did not connect with the A Line but instead continued parallel to it across the Roanoke River into Weldon, North Carolina. In Weldon, it passed underneath the A Line (the Atlantic Coast Line Railroad's main line at the time) at the historic two-level Weldon Union Station.

From Weldon, it continued east to Roanoke Rapids. Track from Weldon to Roanoke Rapids is still in service and it is now CSX's Roanoke Rapids Spur. The line historically continued from Roanoke Rapids west to Norlina, where it connected with the Seaboard Air Line's main line.

== History ==
=== Formation ===
The first segment of the line was built in 1835 by the Portsmouth and Roanoke Railroad, which would be renamed the Seaboard and Roanoke Railroad. The Seaboard and Roanoke Railroad ran from Portsmouth to Weldon, North Carolina.

The line from Roanoke Rapids to Norlina opened in 1840 and was built by the Raleigh and Gaston Railroad. In 1852, the Raleigh and Gaston Railroad was extended from Roanoke Rapids east to Weldon. Its connection from Roanoke Rapids north to Gaston was permanently severed during the American Civil War. The extension to Weldon connected with the Seaboard and Roanoke Railway, essentially making a continuous line. The extension to Weldon also provided a connection with the Petersburg Railroad and the Wilmington and Weldon Railroad, both of which later became the main line of the Atlantic Coast Line Railroad.

In 1900, the Seaboard and Roanoke Railroad, Raleigh and Gaston Railroad, and other railroads were merged into a single company named the Seaboard Air Line Railway (later known as the Seaboard Air Line Railroad).

=== Seaboard Air Line years ===
Portsmouth Subdivision

Overview
- Status: Still operating east of Garysburg, North Carolina under CSX
- Owner: Seaboard Air Line Railroad
- Termini: Portsmouth, Virginia; Norlina, North Carolina

Technical
- Line length: 115.3 mi (185.6 km)
- Track gauge: 1,435 mm (4 ft 8 1/2 in) standard gauge
- Electrification: No
- Signalling: None
Route map
Interactive Map of the Portsmouth Subdivision during the Seaboard Air Line's operation. (Click to enlarge)

The Seaboard Air Line designated the line from Norlina to Portsmouth as the Portsmouth Subdivision (while the Raleigh and Gaston's track from Norlina to Raleigh, North Carolina became Seaboard's main line). The Seaboard operated passenger and freight service over the line. Though the 1950s, Seaboard ran a daily passenger train (which also carried mail) and a daily through freight train. A separate local freight train ran three days a week at the time.

=== Later years ===
In 1967, the SAL merged with its rival, the Atlantic Coast Line Railroad (ACL), whose main line crossed the Portsmouth Subdivision in Weldon. The merged company was named the Seaboard Coast Line Railroad (SCL). The line remained largely intact after the merger. However, SCL severed the bridge over the Roanoke River to consolidate the river crossings on the A Line's parallel bridge (the ex-ACL main line) effectively truncating the Portsmouth Subdivision to its current terminus in Garysburg. Ruins of the Portsmouth Subdivision's bridge over the river are still standing next to US 301 in Weldon. The remaining track from Weldon to Norlina was then redesignated as the Roanoke Rapids Subdivision.

In 1980, the Seaboard Coast Line's parent company merged with the Chessie System, creating the CSX Corporation. The CSX Corporation initially operated the Chessie and Seaboard Systems separately until 1986, when they were merged into CSX Transportation, who continues to operate today.

== Historic Seaboard Air Line stations ==
State	Milepost	City/Location	Station	Connections and notes
VA	SA 0.0	Portsmouth	Portsmouth	
VA	SA 7.5	Chesapeake	Bowers	
VA	SA 15.1		Magnolia	junction with Virginian Railway (N&W)
VA	SA 17.5	Suffolk	Suffolk	junction with: Atlantic Coast Line Railroad Norfolk—Rocky Mount Line; Atlantic and Danville Railway (N&W)
VA	SA 20.2		Kilby	junction with Norfolk and Petersburg Railroad (N&W)
VA	SA 26.2		Purvis	
VA	SA 31.4		Carrsville	
VA	SA 37.1	Franklin	Franklin	also known as Blackwater junction with Atlantic and Danville Railway (N&W)
VA	SA 42.0		Delaware	
VA	SA 43.7		Hand	also known as Handsom
VA	SA 49.1	Newsoms	Newsoms	
VA	SA 54.1	Boykins	Boykins	junction with Seaboard Air Line Railroad Lewiston Subdivision
VA	SA 57.0	Branchville	Branchville	
VA	SA 59.9		Hugo	
NC	SA 63.2		Margarettsville	
NC	SA 69.2	Seaboard	Seaboard	originally Concord
NC	SA 72.6		Gumberry	
NC	SA 76.2	Garysburg	Garysburg	
NC	SA 78.8	Weldon	Weldon	junction with Atlantic Coast Line Railroad Main Line
NC	SA 82.7	Roanoke Rapids	Roanoke Junction	junction with spur to Roanoke Rapids
NC	SAA 83.7	Roanoke Rapids	Roanoke Rapids	located on spur
NC	SA 84.9		Bolling	
NC	SA 91.2		Thelma	
NC	SA 92.7		Summit	
NC	SA 98.3	Littleton	Littleton	
NC	SA 104.0		Vaughan	
NC	SA 109.0	Macon	Macon	
NC	SA 113.3		Warren Plains	
NC	SA 115.3	Norlina	Norlina	originally Ridgeway Junction junction with Seaboard Air Line Railroad Main Line

== See also ==
- List of CSX Transportation lines
