= North Carolina Highway 186 =

State highway in Northampton County, North Carolina, US

North Carolina Highway 186

Route information
- Maintained by NCDOT
- Length: 23.4 mi (37.7 km)
- Existed: 1975–present

Major junctions
- West end: NC 48 near Gaston
- I-95 near Gaston; US 301 in Garysburg
- East end: SR 186 at the Virginia state line near Branchville, VA

Location
- Country: United States
- State: North Carolina
- Counties: Northampton

Highway system
- North Carolina Highway System; Interstate; US; State; Scenic
← NC 184	→ NC 191

North Carolina Highway 186 (NC 186) is a primary state highway in the U.S. state of North Carolina. Entirely in Northampton County, it helps facilitate truck traffic parallel to I-95 and connects the communities of Seaboard and Margarettsville.

== Route description ==
NC 186 is a two-lane rural highway that traverses 23.4 miles (37.7 km) from NC 48 near Gaston to the Virginia state line near Margarettsville. The first 3.4 miles (5.5 km) parallel I-95 heading south before joining NC 46 towards Garysburg. Once in Garysburg, its concurrency with NC 46 ends and then briefly overlaps with US 301 before it heads in a northeasterly direction out of town. It then proceeds to connect Gumberry, Seaboard, and Margarettsville, before crossing the state line into Virginia, becoming Virginia State Route 186 (SR 186), and heading towards Branchville, Virginia and Boykins, Virginia.

== History ==
Established around 1975 as a renumbering of NC 195; the number change was to match with Virginia's SR 186, which was originally SR 195 before I-195 was established in Richmond, Virginia, around 1970. It remained unchanged until May 21, 2013, when it was extended west and north from its former terminus at US 301 to NC 48. The justification for the extension was to help facilitate truck traffic and serve the Northampton Commerce Park and Enviva Industrial Facility, on what was SR 1200 (Lebanon Church Road and James Jones Road); it can also be used as an alternate route for I-95 in the event traffic has to be rerouted.

=== North Carolina Highway 195 ===
North Carolina Highway 195
- Location: Garysburg-Virginia state line
- Length: 15.8 mi (25.4 km)
- Existed: 1938–1975

North Carolina Highway 195 (NC 195) was established around 1938 as a renumbering of NC 305 between Garysburg to Seaboard, then continuing east on new primary routing into Virginia becoming SR 195. Around 1970, SR 195 was renumbered to SR 186; North Carolina reciprocated in 1975.

== Junction list ==
The entire route is in Northampton County.

Location	mi	km	Destinations	Notes
	0.0	0.0	NC 48 – Gaston	Western terminus
	3.4	5.5	NC 46 west – Gaston	West end of NC 46 overlap
	4.0	6.4	I-95 – Roanoke Rapids, Rocky Mount, Emporia	Exit 176 (I-95)
Garysburg	7.4	11.9	US 301 south / NC 46 ends – Weldon	South end of US 301 overlap and eastern terminus of NC 46
Garysburg	7.6	12.2	US 301 north – Pleasant Hill	North end of US 301 overlap
Seaboard	14.6	23.5	NC 305 south (Main Street) – Jackson	Northern terminus of NC 305
	23.4	37.7	SR 186 east – Branchville	Eastern terminus, Virginia state line
1.000 mi = 1.609 km; 1.000 km = 0.621 mi: Concurrency terminus
