= Virginia State Route 186 =

State highway in southern Virginia, US

State Route 186

Route information
- Maintained by VDOT
- Length: 6.21 mi (9.99 km)
- Existed: c. 1970–present

Major junctions
- West end: NC 186 near Branchville
- East end: SR 35 in Boykins

Location
- Country: United States
- State: Virginia
- Counties: Greensville, Southampton

Highway system
- Virginia Routes; Interstate; US; Primary; Secondary; Byways; History; HOT lanes
← SR 185	→ SR 187

State Route 186 (SR 186) is a primary state highway in the U.S. state of Virginia. The state highway runs 6.21 miles (9.99 km) from the North Carolina state line near Branchville, where the highway continues west as North Carolina Highway 186 (NC 186), east to SR 35 in Boykins.

== Route description ==
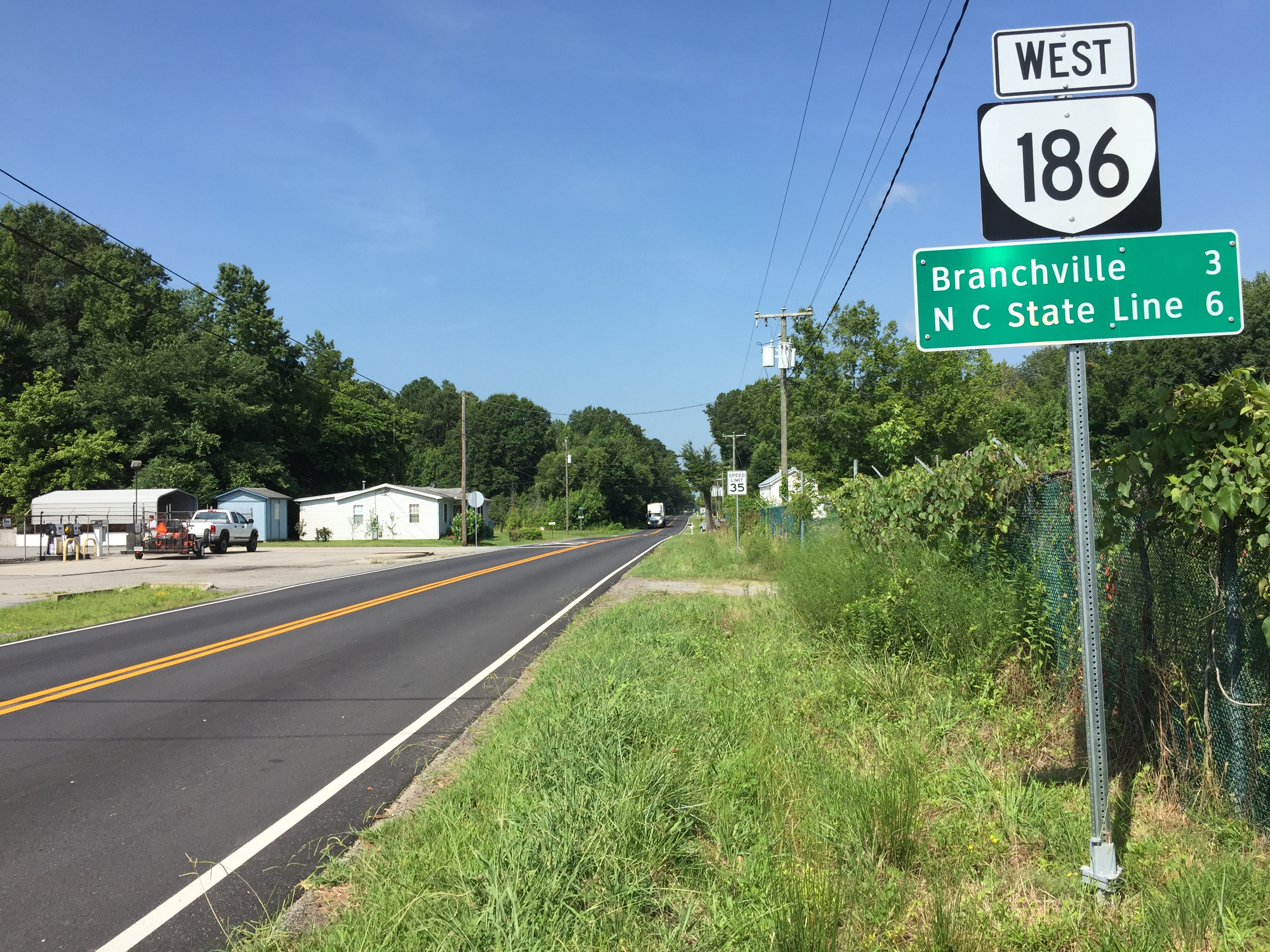
View west along SR 186 just west of Boykins

SR 186 begins at the North Carolina state line southwest of Branchville; the highway continues southwest as NC 186 toward Garysburg. The state highway clips the southeastern corner of Greensville County before crossing the Meherrin River into Southampton County. SR 186 heads northeast as Hugo Road, which parallels CSX's Portsmouth Subdivision northeast to the town of Branchville. The state highway heads through Branchville as Broad Street then becomes Pittman Road between that town and Boykins. SR 186 enters the town of Boykins at its crossing of the North Carolina and Virginia Railroad just south of that railroad's wye junction with the CSX rail line. The state highway becomes Beaton Avenue for the final stretch to its eastern terminus at SR 35 (Main Street).

== Major intersections ==
County	Location	mi	km	Destinations	Notes
Greensville		0.00	0.00	NC 186 west	North Carolina state line; western terminus
Southampton	Branchville			SR 730 – Branchville, Emporia	former SR 88 north
Southampton	Boykins	6.21	9.99	SR 35 (Main Street)	Eastern terminus
1.000 mi = 1.609 km; 1.000 km = 0.621 mi
