= Hamilton Fulton =

Hamilton Fulton (26 May 1781 – 30 October 1833) was a Scottish civil engineer who worked for John Rennie and Thomas Telford before moving for a decade to the state of North Carolina as its principal engineer. Thereafter, he returned to Britain.

== Early years ==
Fulton was born in Paisley, Renfrewshire, Scotland, in 1781 to Hugh Fulton and Barbara Bowy. He worked for John Rennie and for Thomas Telford, both of whom were noted engineers. In the case of the latter, his work included surveys of roads in the Scottish Highlands and in North Wales, as well as work in Sweden and, between 1809 and 1810, a survey of the Stamford Canal. It was while he was in Stamford, Lincolnshire, that he married Sarah Collins Martin, on 25 April 1810.

In 1815, Fulton journeyed to Bermuda on a commission from the Admiralty. There he reported on the development of naval constructions at the recently acquired dockyard on Ireland Island, Bermuda. He was similarly tasked at Malta in 1817, and both of these ventures were conducted under the instruction of Rennie.

== Middle years ==
Subsequently, Fulton met Peter Brown from North Carolina. Brown, who was a member of the state's General Assembly, had fruitlessly spent nearly a year in England, searching for a suitably qualified person to take on the role of state engineer. His search had been hampered by the unwillingness of potential candidates to leave their well-provided situations; Fulton, however, was at that time unemployed and agreed to take the post on a salary of £1200 per annum. Fulton's assistant, Robert H. B. Brazier, was also employed, on the lesser salary of £300. Fulton had been recommended for the post by Rennie and Telford.

The two men immediately set about their tasks. Fulton examined the coastal inlets, sounds and principal rivers with an eye toward practical improvements in navigation while Brazier conducted the surveys and made maps and plates thereof. As chairman of the commission, Murphy prepared a memoir of the situation in the state for the information and instruction of Fulton. The first object in view being to render the rivers navigable, not for steamboats, but for flat boats, carrying produce from river landings down the stream to some lower point for shipment. To this end, the Catawba and Yadkin were deemed navigable almost to the mountains. Ashe declares that Murphy's notes to Fulton indicate such a thorough examination of detail and such a copious volume of information that Murphy himself must be considered possessed of considerable engineering acumen.

One of Fulton's first recommendations was the reopening of Roanoke Inlet which had been closed since 1795. His report thereon conveys a ready appreciation of Fulton's skill and understanding. He understood the necessity of avoiding any deleterious effect on natural vegetation as well as the natural and mechanical forces necessary to keep such an inlet open once it was re-established. The project failed to be realized, but it remained the basis for state planning until well into the 1840s.

Fulton was involved with the construction of the Roanoke Canal. The lower rapids occurs just east of Weldon and extend to above the present City of Roanoke Rapids. At the western edge of Weldon, a small stream known as Chockoyotte Creek enters the river. The proposed canal would have to pass over the creek as it lifted the boats to the higher elevation above the upper rapids. In 1821 Fulton designed the Roanoke Canal aqueduct over Chockoyotte Creek in Halifax County, a 110-foot-long (34 m) structure with a 30-foot (9.1 m) arch, which edifice still stands despite a century of neglect. It is on the National Register of Historic Places. The Roanoke Canal routed river vessels around the rapids, thus opening the upper reaches of the Roanoke River to commercial navigation. An even more impressive structure designed by Fulton over the Dan River at Milton in Caswell County, consisting of eight elliptical stone arches, has been lost.

As well as supervising the execution of his plans for the Roanoke Navigation Co., Fulton spent considerable time attempting to correct the ill-conceived piecemeal construction of the Cape Fear Navigation Co. He also examined and made recommendations on the Wilkesboro–Tennessee turnpike, the Swannanoa Gap road, and the Cherokee road. He recommended a network of state roads, classified, financed and maintained in the manner now current in the state. Consideration was given to a system of canals which would connect the Yadkin and Catawba rivers to the Cape Fear, thereby giving westerners an outlet to the Atlantic.

Political interference with engineering priorities caused no end of difficulties. Every member of the legislature had a pet project in his district that he wanted immediate action taken on. Further, those from the east wanted to be sure that their area got their fair share of the improvements. They were convinced that since the east paid more taxes than the west, that the projects should be preponderantly in the east. Indeed, there was no shortage of worthwhile projects throughout the state. The net result was that piecemeal work was accomplished here, there and elsewhere, but in very few instances was the work of such a character as to provide perceptible improvement in conditions.

In 1822 in his message to the legislature, Governor Holmes said that for several years we have had the services of an able engineer, who has explored our rivers, pointed out the obstructions to their navigation and given instructions as to how they were to be removed, a zealous and intelligent board, pushing the projects by all the means in their power, and still their progress has been so gradual as to be almost imperceptible. "The reason is obvious, we have not concentrated our money in sums sufficiently large to effect the objects to which it has been applied . . . . Had our limited funds been originally directed to a few points of primary and general importance, and nor dispersed in small sums throughout the State, the result would have been more beneficial to every section . . . . For instance, if the channel of the Cape Fear between Wilmington and the bar could have been deepened, so as to allow passage of vessels without the aid of lighters it would have been better. But by dividing our strength so much in attempting to effect everything at once, we have effected comparatively nothing.”

Neither Fulton or the legislature was satisfied with the operation of the internal improvements program in the state. Political machinations, the willingness of the board and the legislature to sacrifice quality in a search for an inexpensive work along with the illusionary expectations of the public that expected immediate results from the improvements prevented Fulton from addressing what he felt were more efficacious needs. Local interests prevented the adoption of a systematic statewide scheme. While working at the Roanoke rapids, Fulton became acquainted with Thomas Moore, the Virginia Engineer. Fulton received a more favorable impression of the Virginia program of internal improvements, and when Moore died, Fulton applied for the position. He was unsuccessful and remained as Principal Engineer for North Carolina.

According to Powell, at that time, most North Carolinians considered engineering to be a lot of academic stuff, devoid of practical value. The average farmer felt he could take a gang of laborers with spades, drag pans and wagons and dig a canal, or construct a road while the Engineers were figuring on it and drawing a lot of useless plans. Indeed, the existing roads had been constructed and maintained in exactly that manner since before the Revolution, under the direction of the County Court.

Fulton's yearly fee of £1200, in gold, amounting to $5,333 plus expenses, aroused no small amount of envy, particularly from politicians. Further, the sources of funds were not yielding as had been hoped. The State was having difficulty collecting on its land sales of the Cherokee tracts, the Bank of New Bern stock declined and further, few of the internal improvement projects paid on any regular basis.

In 1825, the House passed a resolution directing the Board to reduce Fulton's salary to $3,300 and to hire his services out to other states as occasion arose. As a result of these frustrations, Fulton resigned in March 1826 and took a similar position in Georgia. There, he discovered he had been engaged by a discredited board, a situation not unlike that in North Carolina, and by the end of the year Fulton found himself in private practice in Milledgeville, at that time the capital of Georgia.

Fulton and his family, while in Raleigh, being Anglicans, attended Christ Episcopal Church, and one of his daughters, Julia Jane was born there. Fulton's wife Sarah was greatly admired. David L. Swain wrote that Mrs. Fulton "is worth $1000 per annum to Raleigh, & the society of the place would suffer an irreparable loss by her removal." Swain described Fulton as "blunt but of very friendly disposition and one of the most scientific men in the country.”

In retrospect, it may have been better that Fulton did not receive proper support from the State in the construction of a canal system. A better system was at hand. In 1825 the first railroad locomotive appeared in the United States. In 1827 Joseph Caldwell published a series of newspaper essays advocating this new system of transportation. They were collected and published the next year in a pamphlet entitled The Numbers of Carlton which caught the public imagination and led to the construction of the first railroads in the state.

== Last years ==
Fulton suffered from poor health in the climate of the USA and, in 1829, he returned to Britain. There he employed one of his eight children, Hamilton Henry Fulton, as a pupil. In 1832, Fulton made proposals for the construction of a harbor and breakwaters at the coalfield port of Amble in Northumberland. Although these came to nothing, the idea was revived in a different form by Rennie's son, John Rennie the Younger, a few years later. He also worked with Rennie junior on surveys of the railway line between London and Brighton.

He died in 1833 at his home in Upper Stamford Street, Lambeth.
