= William Lawrence Bottomley =

American architect

William Lawrence Bottomley (February 24, 1883 – February 1, 1951), was an American architect in twentieth-century New York City; Middleburg, Virginia; and Richmond, Virginia. He was known for his Colonial Revival designs of residential buildings in the United States and many of his commissions are situated in highly aspirational locations, including Monument Avenue in Richmond, Virginia.

== Education ==
Educated at the Horace Mann School in New York, Bottomley graduated from Columbia University in 1906 with a Bachelor of Science degree in architecture. In 1907 he won Columbia's McKim Fellowship in Architecture award, which funded two years of study abroad, half of it in residence at the American Academy in Rome. In 1908 he entered the Ecole des Beaux-Arts in Paris, in the atelier of Victor Laloux, where he studied until 1909, when he returned to America to begin formal practice as an architect.

== Personal life ==
William Lawrence was the son of John A. Bottomley, President of the Marconi Corporation in the Americas, and Susan Amelia Mersereau Steers. He married Harriet Townsend, a sculptor and writer, on August 26, 1909 at Beech Hill in Westport, New York. Harriet's love for gardening may have influenced William's strong alliance with landscape architect Charles Gillette. William and Harriet had three daughters: Harriet, Susan, and Virginia.

== Career ==
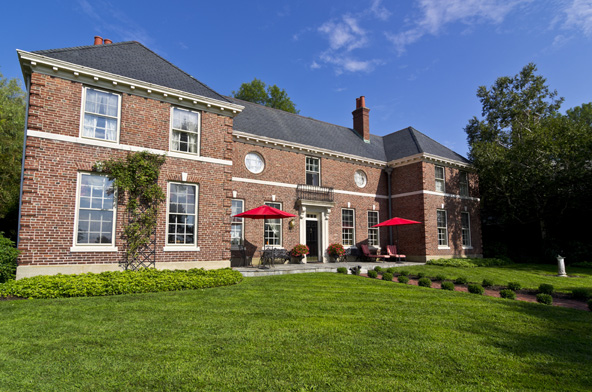
155 Western Promenade in Portland, Maine

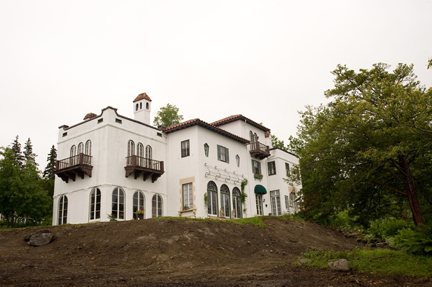
Bottomley designed two homes in Maine. This is his Mediterranean-style house in Castine

In his 40-year career, Bottomley executed 186 commissions, 40% of which were in Virginia. "Bottomley's clients...while well-to-do, didn't have names with the lofty status of Rockefeller, Whitney, or Widener." Eleven of Bottomley's commissions are currently listed individually on the National Register of Historic Places. Eight of these are in Virginia.

Bottomley designed a residence (see right photo) at 155 Western Promenade in Portland, Maine.

Walter Davis, son of a prominent Portland family, was a graduate of Yale and of Harvard Law School. Very much a modern man in his professional life–as an attorney he was active in the affairs of banks and railroads in the state–he was, in his private life, a dedicated historian. For many years he was president of the Maine Historical Society, and like many of his generation and class, Davis was a dedicated Anglophile, visiting England regularly. His Cape Elizabeth summer house was a pure adaptation of a 16th-century Cotswold manor house. For his city house on Portland’s Western Promenade, he chose to visit the 18th century, evoking the England of Johnson and Boswell, by duplicating an English manor in the early 18th century style. For his architect, he chose William Lawrence Bottomley, a society architect noted for his sophisticated brick Georgian houses in Virginia and Long Island, in association with Leigh French, Jr., a New York architect-decorator best known today for his early books about Colonial interiors.

According to Maine State Historian Earle Shettleworth, Jr., who knew Davis, the model was a manor house that Davis had seen on a bicycle tour of England, likely the charming Stuart-style brick manor at Chipping Camden, whose design and composition were closely followed in the Davis house with a few differences–notably the balconet over the entrance, in the Portland house–as translated to a city lot. It was one of the last of the large houses built on the Western Promenade (1920), and its very proper Englishness added a new style note to the eclectic mix already present in the neighborhood. Inside, high paneled rooms; tall, deeply recessed windows; and Georgian chimneypieces made a reassuringly correct backdrop in which the Dowager Countess might feel at home, not surprising as Davis originally shared this house with his mother, who had formerly lived around the corner in the grand Edwardian mansion that John Calvin Stevens had designed for Walter Davis Sr. nearly four decades earlier.

In 1918, young U.S. Army lawyer Walter G. Davis, Jr. worked with the American Commission to Negotiate Peace in Paris, resulting in the Treaty of Versailles, where Europe was divided after World War I. Two years later, he swept into fashionable 155 Western Promenade, with its 32-foot salon for entertaining; inset Grand Tour paintings collected by Davis during his travels; and a library featuring a priceless Zuber & Cie mural from Paris: the Boston panel of Views of North America.

His work is now the subject of the Historic Richmond Foundation's Year of Bottomley events.

== Works ==
- 1912: Southampton High School (now Southampton Town Hall), Southampton, New York
- 1915: 2324 Monument Avenue, Richmond, Virginia
- 1918: 2309 Monument Avenue, Richmond, Virginia
- 1920: 155 Western Promenade, Portland, Maine
- 1922–1924: addition to the Hotel Albert, New York City
- 1923: 2315 Monument Avenue, Richmond, Virginia
- 1923–1924: Blue Ridge Farm, Greenwood, Virginia
- 1924: Stuart Court Apartments, Richmond, Virginia
- 1924: 2601 Monument Avenue, Richmond, Virginia
- 1926: William and Helen Ziegler House, 116-118 E 55th Street, New York City
- 1927: (remodeling) Emmanuel Episcopal Church, Warrenton, North Carolina
- 1928: Casa Maria (addition), Greenwood, Virginia
- 1928: Dakota, Warrenton, Virginia
- 1929: Waverly Hill, Staunton, Virginia
- 1920s: 2320 Monument Avenue, Richmond, Virginia
- 1920s: 2714 Monument Avenue, Richmond, Virginia
- 1930s (remodeling): Rocklands, near Gordonsville, Virginia
- 1933–1935 (remodeling): Col Alto, Lexington, Virginia
- 1934: DeLeon F. Green House in the Weldon Historic District, Weldon, North Carolina
- 1939: Newton White Mansion, Mitchelville, Maryland
