= Weldon Historic District =

Historic district in North Carolina, United States

- U.S. National Register of Historic Places
- U.S. Historic district
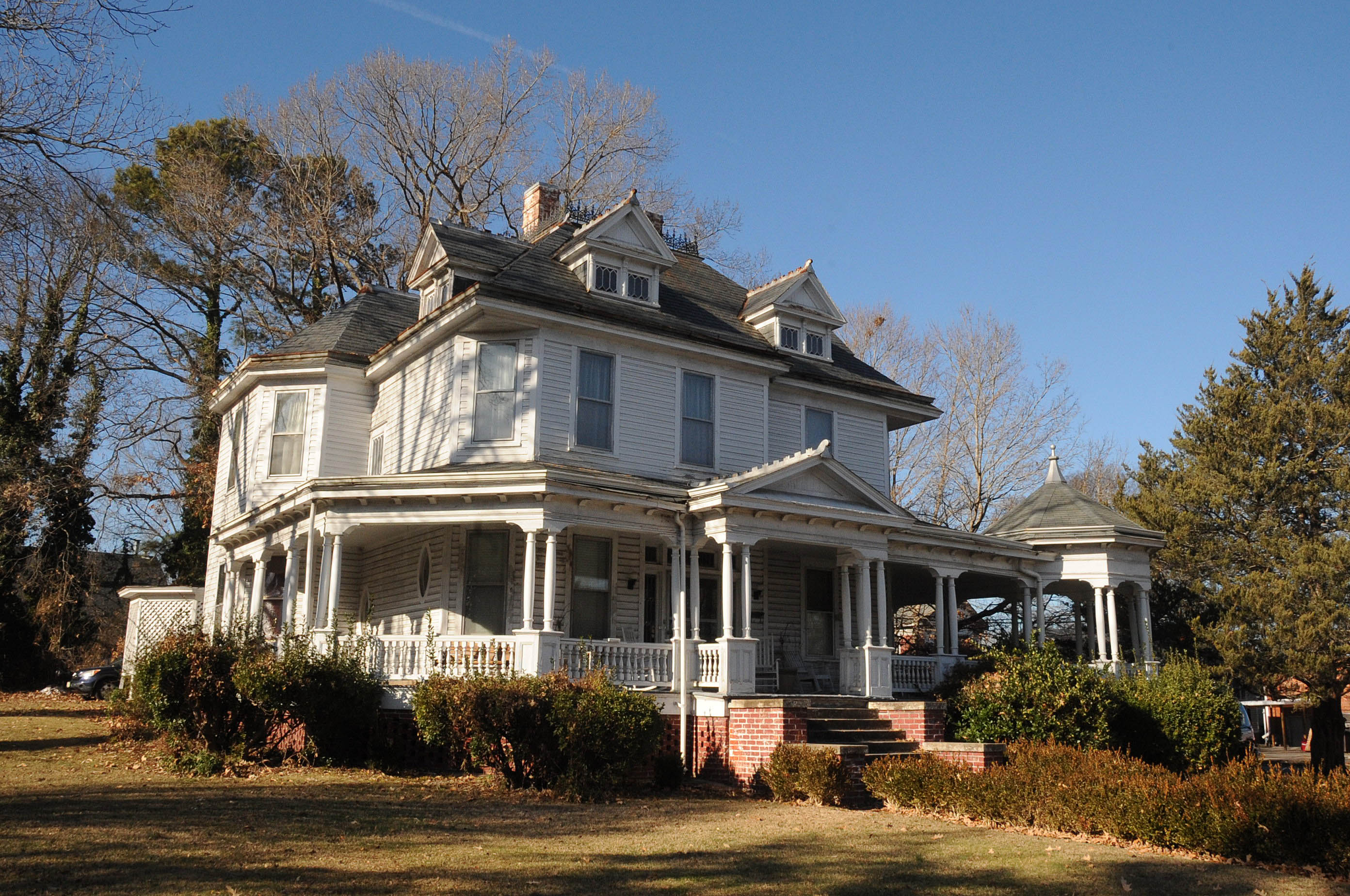
- Smith-Dickens House

- Location within North Carolina Location within the United States
- Location: Roughly bounded by US 301, Woodlawn Ave., Cedar St., 8th and 9th Sts., and CSX RR tracks, Weldon, North Carolina
- Coordinates: 36°25′28″N 77°35′51″W
- Area: 109 acres (44 ha)
- Built: 1882
- Architect: Aladdin Company; Bottomly, William Lawrence, et al.
- Architectural style: Queen Anne, Bungalow/craftsman, Colonial Revival
- NRHP reference No.: 96000565
- Added to NRHP: May 23, 1996

Weldon Historic District is a national historic district located at Weldon, Halifax County, North Carolina. It encompasses 256 contributing buildings, 2 contributing structures, and 9 contributing structures in the central business district and surrounding residential sections of the town of Weldon. The district includes notable examples of Queen Anne, Colonial Revival, and Bungalow / American Craftsman style architecture. The district overlaps the Roanoke Canal Historic District. Notable buildings include the Larkin-Hart House (c. 1871), Ashley L. Stainback House c. (1879), Smith-Dickens House (1901-1902), DeLeon F. Green House (1934) designed by William Lawrence Bottomley, Emry-Zollicoffer Building (1877), Bank of Weldon Building (c. 1895), George C. Green Building/Bank of Halifax Building (1915), Weldon Grocery Company Building (1913), (former) Weldon Town Hall (1893), United States Post Office (1938), Weldon Freight Depot (c. 1840), Coca-Cola Bottling Company (1925), and Atlantic Coast Line Railroad Embankment and Viaduct.

It was listed on the National Register of Historic Places in 1996.
