= Seaboard and Roanoke Railroad =

- Route (click to enlarge)

Overview
- Locale: Virginia; North Carolina
- Successor: Seaboard Air Line Railroad; Seaboard Coast Line Railroad; CSX Transportation

Technical
- Track gauge: 4 ft 8 1/2 in (1,435 mm) standard gauge
- Previous gauge: 4 ft 8 in (1,422 mm)

The Seaboard and Roanoke Railroad was organized in 1833 (as the Portsmouth and Roanoke Railroad) to extend from the area of the rapids of the Roanoke River at its fall line near Weldon, North Carolina to Portsmouth, Virginia, across the Elizabeth River from Norfolk on the harbor of Hampton Roads.

== History ==
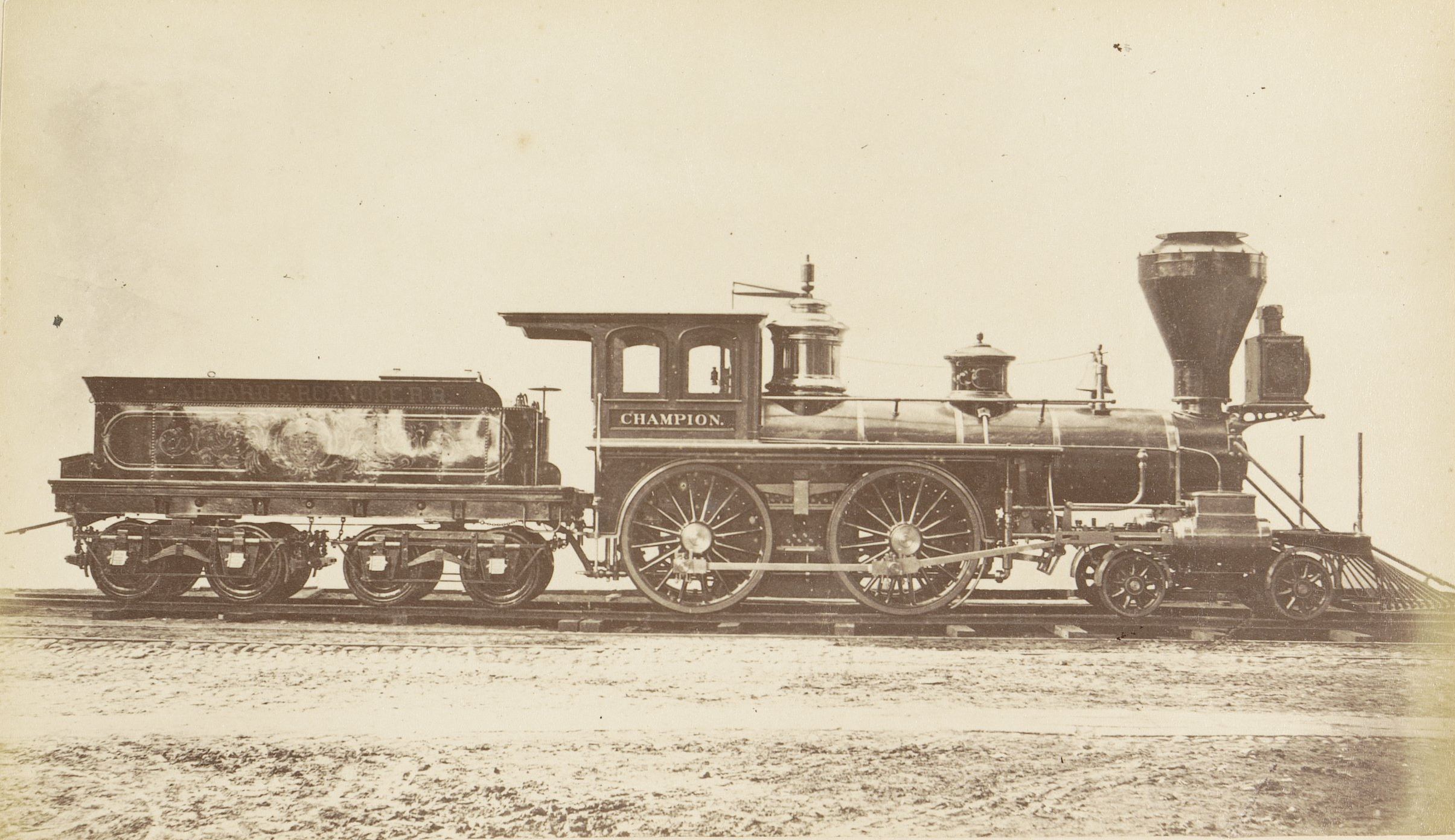
4-4-0 steam locomotive Champion

In the early 19th century, competition was fierce among Virginia's port cities to be the point where export products such as tobacco could be transferred to ocean-going and coast-wise shipping. Canals, turnpikes and railroads became important conduits in the antebellum period in Virginia.

The original goal of the Portsmouth and Roanoke Railroad was to provide a link for shipments of goods originating on the Roanoke River and its canal system from points west to reach port facilities in the Norfolk area on the harbor of Hampton Roads. For such traffic, Norfolk and Portsmouth were fiercely competitive with Petersburg, which had access to the navigable portion of the James River at City Point via about 8 miles of the Appomattox River below its fall line, and was also planning rail service from its south and west.

The new 80-mile (130 km) line, built in 4 ft 8 in (1,422 mm) gauge was first completed in 1835. Some of the intermediate points in Virginia were Boykins, Franklin, Carrsville, and Suffolk. Lumber was the largest commodity originating along the line, and the facilities of the Camp Company's lumber and paper mill operations in Franklin were located there due to the new railroad.

The Seaboard and Roanoke was the first railroad to reach the Norfolk area, which eventually became a busy point for many railroads. However, it was to be more than 20 years before the Norfolk and Petersburg Railroad, a predecessor of the Norfolk and Western Railway built by William Mahone, was completed. Through several financial reorganizations, and refinancing by the Virginia Board of Public Works in 1838, it was variously known as the Portsmouth and Roanoke Railroad and the Seaboard and Roanoke Railroad.

== 1837 Head-on collision and Derailment ==
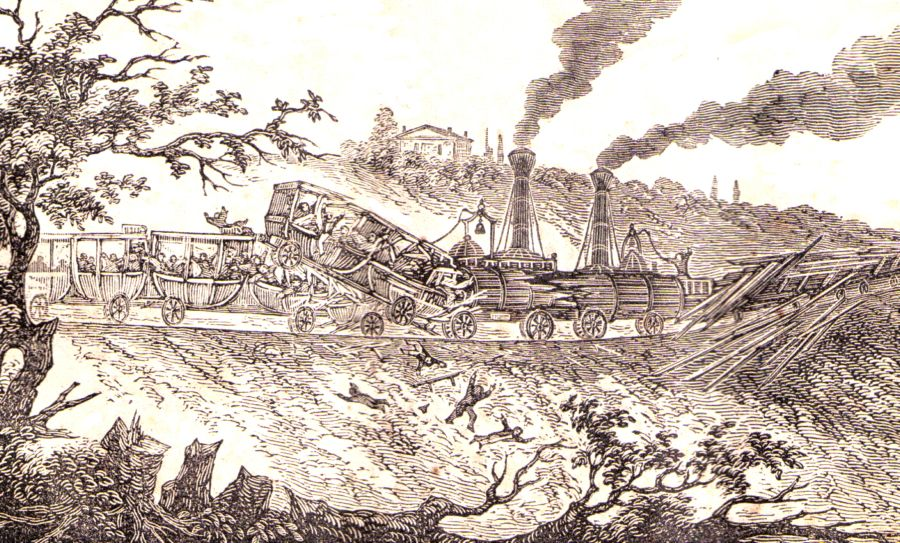
Roanoke collision

On August 11, 1837 the first head-on railroad collision to result in passenger fatalities in the United States occurred near Suffolk when an eastbound lumber train coming down a grade at speed rounded a sharp curve and smacked into the morning passenger train from Portsmouth, Virginia. The first three of thirteen stagecoach-style cars were smashed, killing three daughters of the prominent Ely family and injuring dozens of the 200 on board. They were returning from a steamboat cruise when the accident happened. An engraving depicting the moment of impact was published in Howland's "Steamboat Disasters and Railroad Accidents" in 1840.

On December 12 of the same year an eastbound engine of the Portsmouth and Roanoke Railroad pulling 3 passenger cars and 9 lumber cars loaded with cotton struck an upturned end of a split metal rail 2 miles west of the Nottoway River near the present day village of Handsom in Southampton County. The resulting derailment killed a Miss Blow and a Miss Rochelle from Southampton and injured several others including Capt. James D. Bryant whose legs were broken, Col. Nathaniel Rochelle, a Mr. Blow and Miss King and Miss Simmons also of Southampton. Senator William C. Preston of South Carolina who was on board escaped injury.

== American Civil War ==
Thirteenth annual report of the president and directors to the stockholders of the Seaboard and Roanoke Railroad Company March 28, 1861.

One of the Seaboard and Roanoke's builders from the mid-1830s' was Walter Gwynn, who, during the American Civil War, became a Confederate General assigned to take charge of the defenses of Norfolk, which were held by the southern troops for about a year in 1861–62. Early in that period, fellow railroader William Mahone used his Norfolk and Petersburg Railroad and ruse tactics to feign massive arrivals of additional Confederate troops at Norfolk. Without a single shot fired, he successfully tricked the small detachment of troops holding the Gosport Shipyard (now Norfolk Navy Yard) into abandoning it for the safety of Union-held Fort Monroe across the harbor.

== Mergers: SAL, SCL, CSX ==
In the 1880s, the Seaboard and Roanoke became part of the Seaboard Air Line Railway system, which was extended through Petersburg to reach Richmond to the north and covered the southeastern states to reach Florida.

In 1967, the Seaboard Air Line Railroad merged with its arch-rival, the Atlantic Coast Line railroad to form Seaboard Coast Line Industries (SCL).

SCL merged with the Chessie System in 1980, to form CSX Transportation, which is currently one of seven major Class 1 railroads operating in North America in the 21st century. Most of the line remains in service today, which is now CSX's Portsmouth Subdivision.

== Future ==
A portion of the line in the cities of Suffolk and western Chesapeake has been included in studies by the Virginia Department of Rail and Public Transportation of the feasibility of Richmond-South Hampton Roads High Speed Passenger Rail service. A suburban Norfolk-area station has been projected to be located near Bowers Hill in Chesapeake.

== Suffolk Passenger Station ==
The circa-1885 Seaboard Passenger Station at Suffolk, Virginia was shared with the coal hauling Virginian Railway when it was built adjacently in the early 20th century. Featuring a brick octagonal cupola for its telegraph operators, the station was restored and now houses a railroad museum, operating model trains based upon of Suffolk around 1907, and a gift shop.

== Historic Station listing ==
State	Milepost	City/Location	Station	Connections and notes
VA	SA 0.0	Portsmouth	Portsmouth	
VA	SA 7.5	Chesapeake	Bowers	
VA	SA 15.1		Magnolia	junction with Virginian Railway (N&W)
VA	SA 17.5	Suffolk	Suffolk	junction with: Norfolk and Carolina Railroad (ACL); Atlantic and Danville Railway (N&W)
VA	SA 20.2		Kilby	junction with Norfolk and Petersburg Railroad (N&W)
VA	SA 26.2		Purvis	
VA	SA 31.4		Carrsville	
VA	SA 37.1	Franklin	Franklin	also known as Blackwater junction with Atlantic and Danville Railway (N&W)
VA	SA 42.0		Delaware	
VA	SA 43.7		Hand	also known as Handsom
VA	SA 49.1	Newsoms	Newsoms	
VA	SA 54.1	Boykins	Boykins	junction with Seaboard Air Line Railroad Lewiston Subdivision
VA	SA 57.0	Branchville	Branchville	
VA	SA 59.9		Hugo	
NC	SA 63.2		Margarettsville	
NC	SA 69.2	Seaboard	Seaboard	originally Concord
NC	SA 72.6		Gumberry	
NC	SA 76.2	Garysburg	Garysburg	junction with Petersburg Railroad (ACL)
NC	SA 78.8	Weldon	Weldon	junction with: Raleigh and Gaston Railroad (SAL); Wilmington and Weldon Railroad (ACL)
