= Roanoke and Tar River Railroad =

Overview
- Locale: Virginia; North Carolina
- Dates of operation: 1888–1911
- Successor: Seaboard Air Line Railroad; Seaboard Coast Line Railroad

Technical
- Track gauge: 4 ft 8 1/2 in (1,435 mm) standard gauge

The Roanoke and Tar River Railroad was a railroad running from Boykins, Virginia south to Lewiston, North Carolina, a distance of 36 miles.

The Roanoke and Tar River Railroad was chartered by the North Carolina State Legislature in 1871 though no action to construct the line happened until 1885, when the charter was reissued. It would operate as a subsidiary of the Seaboard and Roanoke Railroad, which it connected with at the north end in Boykins. Construction began in 1887 and was complete a year later.

In 1892, the Murfreesboro Railroad was built, which branched off the Roanoke and Tar River Railroad at Pendleton and ran to Murfreesboro, North Carolina. The Roanoke and Tar River Railroad would acquire the Murfreesboro Railroad in 1893 and operated it as a branch line until 1897. When they discontinued service on the branch, the town of Murfreesboro took action to prevent the abandonment. But in the late evening of May 7, 1897, the company removed the branch's tracks in the dark of the night.

By the end of the 1800s, the Seaboard and Roanoke Railroad became part of the Seaboard Air Line Railway network. The Roanoke and Tar River Railroad was fully merged into the Seaboard Air Line in 1911. The line would operate as the Seaboard Air Line's Lewiston Subdivision.

In 1967, the Seaboard Air Line merged with its rival, the Atlantic Coast Line Railroad (ACL). The merged company was named the Seaboard Coast Line Railroad (SCL). The Lewiston Subdivision connected with an ex-ACL line in Kelford. In 1980, the Seaboard Coast Line's parent company merged with the Chessie System, creating the CSX Corporation. The CSX Corporation initially operated the Chessie and Seaboard Systems separately until 1986, when they were merged into CSX Transportation.

The southernmost five miles of the line from Kelford to Lewiston was abandoned sometime after 1986. The remaining line from Boykins to Kelford was sold to the North Carolina and Virginia Railroad in 1987, who operates the line today.

== Historic stations ==
State	Milepost	City/Location	Station	Connections and notes
VA	SAB 54.1	Boykins	Boykins	junction with Seaboard and Roanoke Railroad (SAL)
NC	SAB 59.3	Severn	Severn	
NC	SAB 62.2		Pendleton	junction with branch to Murfreesboro
NC	SAB 67.4		Milwaukee	
NC	SAB 70.9		Potecasi	
NC	SAB 73.0	Woodland	Woodland	
NC	SAB 77.3	Rich Square	Rich Square	
NC	SAB 82.5	Roxobel	Roxobel	
NC	SAB 84.3	Kelford	Kelford	junction with Norfolk and Carolina Railroad (ACL)
NC	SAB 89.3	Lewiston	Lewiston	
