= North Carolina Highway 46 =

Highway in Northampton County, North Carolina

North Carolina Highway 46

Route information
- Maintained by NCDOT
- Length: 16.9 mi (27.2 km)
- Existed: 1929-1930–present

Major junctions
- West end: SR 46 at the Virginia state line near Henrico
- NC 48 in Gaston; I-95 near Roanoke Rapids
- East end: US 301 / NC 186 in Garysburg

Location
- Country: United States
- State: North Carolina
- Counties: Northampton

Highway system
- North Carolina Highway System; Interstate; US; State; Scenic
← NC 45	→ NC 47

North Carolina Highway 46 (NC 46) is a primary state highway in the U.S. state of North Carolina; it is entirely in Northampton County. The route primarily connects the communities on the north side of Roanoke Rapids Lake and Lake Gaston, as well as the north side of the Roanoke River in the county.

== Route description ==
NC 46 begins at its western terminus at the Virginia state line near Henrico. The road in Virginia continues north as Virginia State Route 46 towards Lawrenceville, Virginia. The two-lane roads heads east through a mostly forested area of the county, staying between one to one and a half miles (1.6 to 2.4 km) north of the Roanoke Rapids Lake shoreline. At the intersection of River Road, North Carolina Bicycle Route 4 joins to form a concurrency with NC 46 from here to Gaston. There is a small cluster of homes as the road passes the settlement of Vultare. Forested areas begin to give way to a mix of farms and small single-family houses. Soon, the road enters the town of Gaston intersecting NC 48 in the center of the town. This intersection marks the end of the Bike Route 4 concurrency.

East of NC 48, the road begins to curve to the southeast as it passes through Gaston's residential neighborhoods. The road resumes a more rural surrounding again as it passes some farms, small homes, and light industrial businesses. Before an interchange with Interstate 95 (I-95), NC 186 joins NC 46 from the north to form a concurrency for the remainder of NC 46's trip. In the vicinity of I-95's exit 176, a diamond interchange, there are few traveler services in the immediate vicinity—only one each of a gas station, restaurant, and motel. After a short stretch of road in a rural area, NC 46 enters Garysburg passing through a mainly residential section of the town before it ends at a stop-controlled T-intersection with U.S. Route 301 (US 301). NC 186 heads north from this point along US 301 before it continues towards Virginia to the northeast.

== History ==
NC 46 was created between 1929 and 1930. The routing has changed very little since that time, but its eastern terminus used to be signed as US 1/US 17/US 117/NC 48/NC 481.

== Major intersections ==
The entire route is in Northampton County.

Location	mi	km	Destinations	Notes
	0.0	0.0	SR 46 north (Christanna Highway) – Lawrenceville	Virginia state line
Gaston	10.4	16.7	NC 48 (Roanoke Rapids / Pleasants Hill Roads) – Roanoke Rapids, Pleasant Hill	
	12.9	20.8	NC 186 west (Lebanon Church Road)	Western end of NC 186 concurrency
	13.4– 13.6	21.6– 21.9	I-95 – Roanoke Rapids, Rocky Mount, Emporia, VA	Exit 176 (I-95)
Garysburg	16.9	27.2	US 301 / NC 186 east to US 158 – Weldon, Pleasant Hill, Seaboard	Eastern end of NC 186 concurrency
1.000 mi = 1.609 km; 1.000 km = 0.621 mi: Concurrency terminus
