= Col Alto =

Historic house in Virginia, United States

- U.S. National Register of Historic Places
- Virginia Landmarks Register
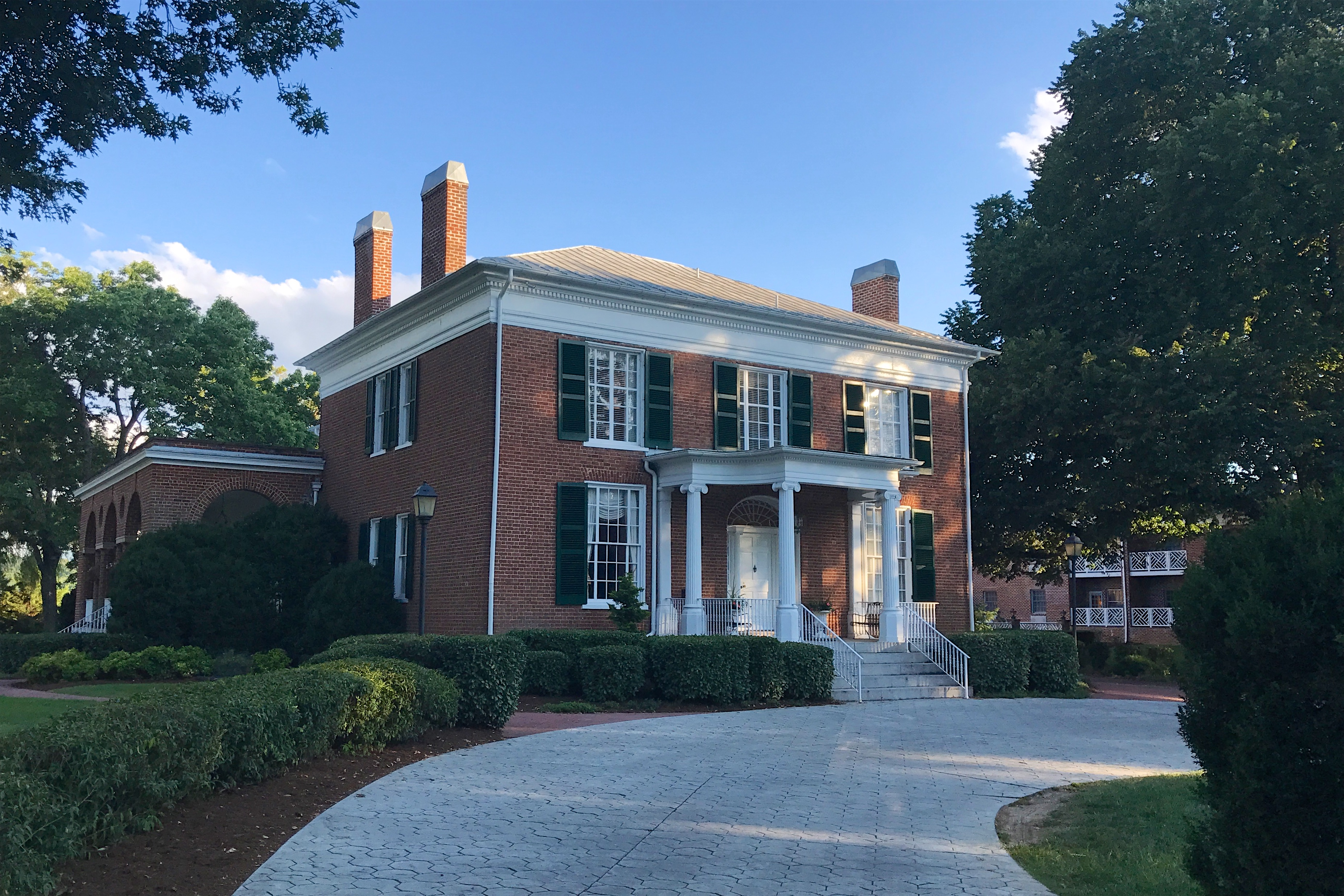
- Col Alto, August 2017

- Location within Virginia Location within the United States
- Location: Nelson and Spotswood Dr., Lexington, Virginia
- Coordinates: 37°46′49″N 79°26′21″W
- Area: 7 acres (2.8 ha)
- Built: 1827
- Architect: William Lawrence Bottomley
- Architectural style: Classical Revival, Georgian
- NRHP reference No.: 89001925
- VLR No.: 117-0003

Significant dates
- Added to NRHP: November 19, 1990
- Designated VLR: September 20, 1988

Col Alto is a historic home located at Lexington, Virginia. The original section was built about 1827, and is a two-story, double-pile, three-bay, Georgian style brick dwelling with a hipped roof. In the 1930s, the house was remodeled, enlarged, and modernized by architect William Lawrence Bottomley. Bottomley added the distinctive Palladian style veranda. Also on the property are a contributing barn and log cabin. Col Alto was the home of Congressman James McDowell (1795-1851), for whom the house was built, and Congressman Henry St. George Tucker III (1853-1932).

It was listed on the National Register of Historic Places in 1990. It is now operating as a Hampton Inn and Suites by Hilton.

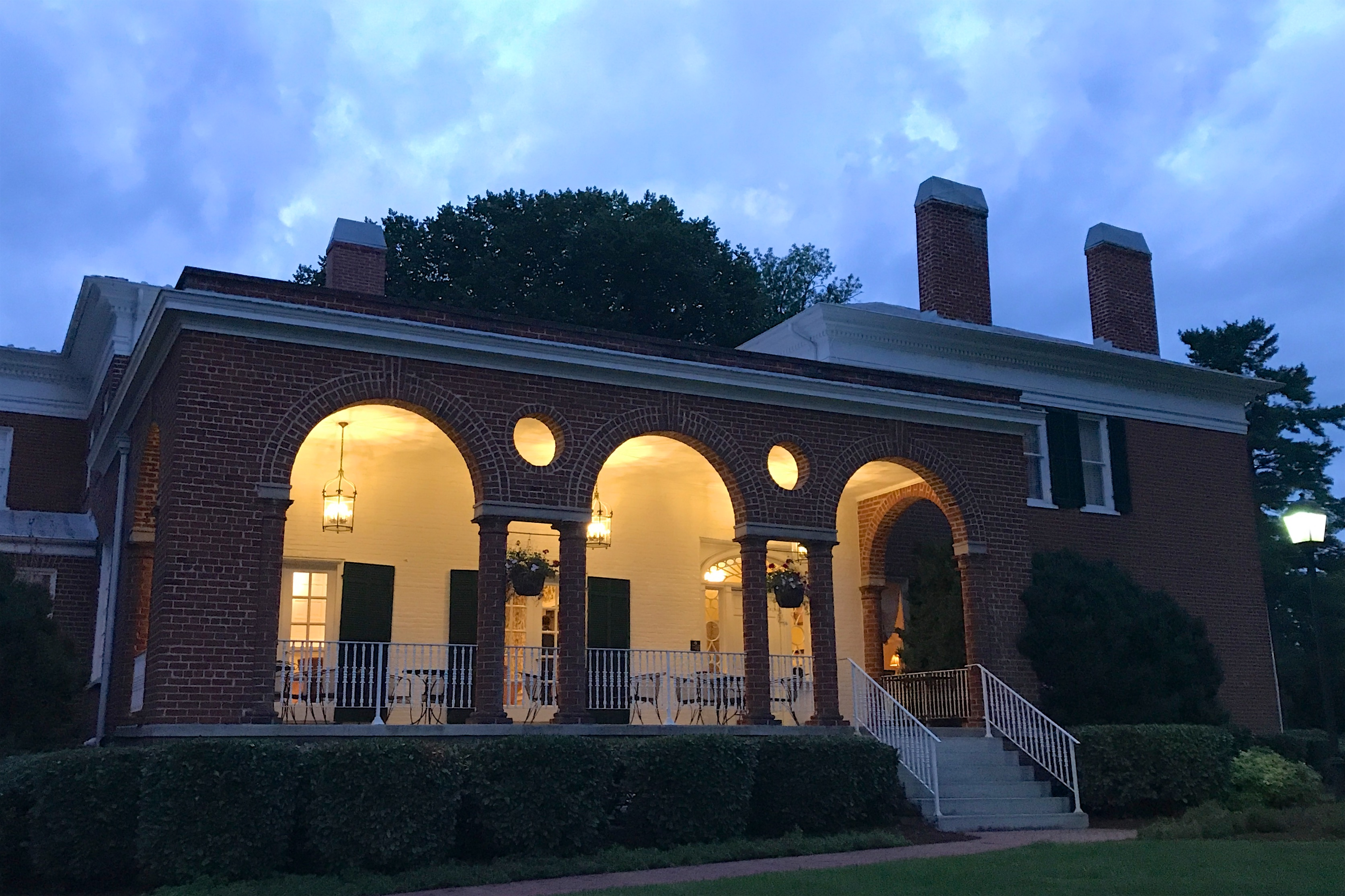
Veranda of Col Alto at dawn

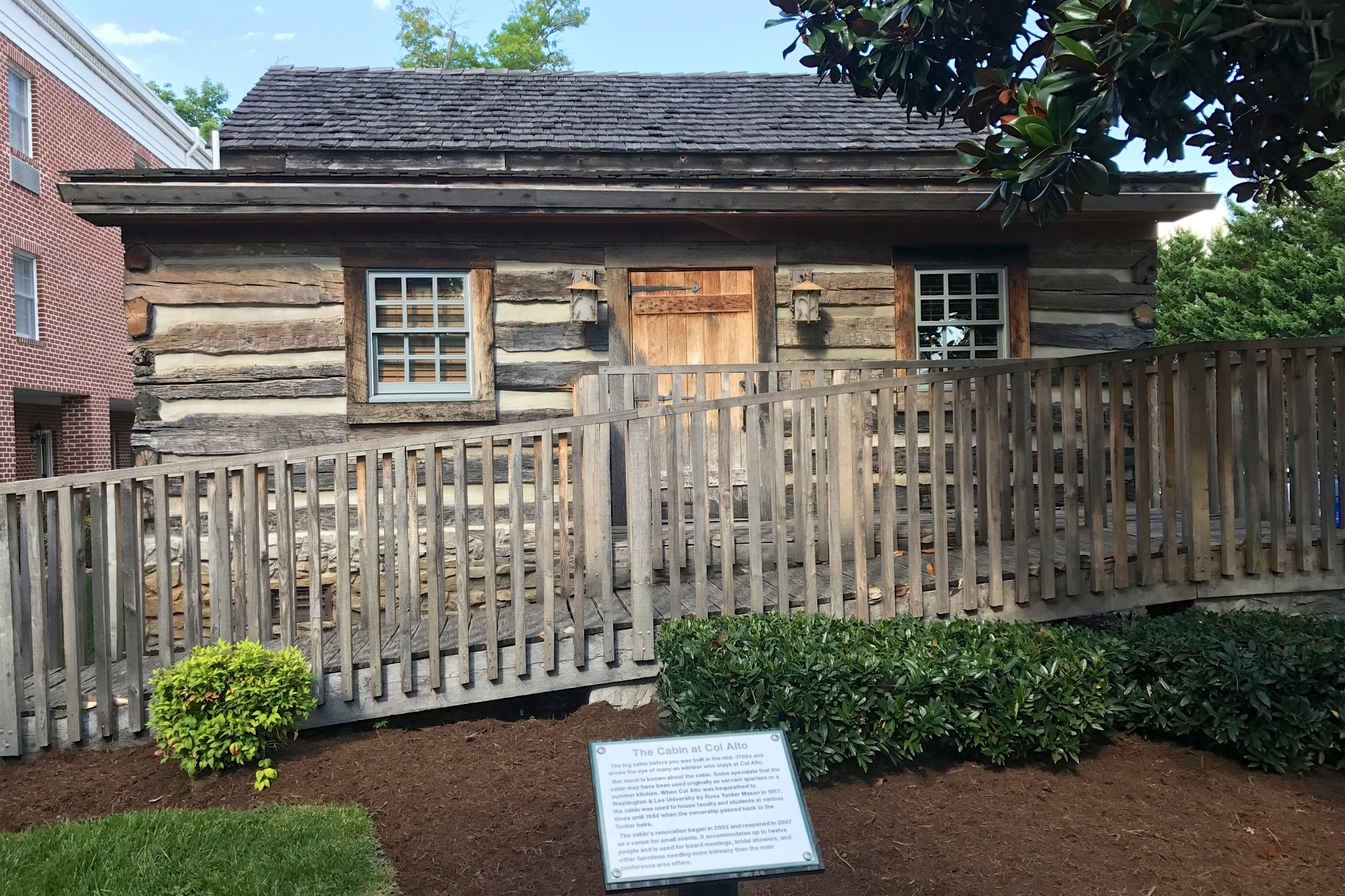
Log cabin built in the mid-1700s at Col Alto
