= Rocklands (Gordonsville, Virginia) =

Historic house in Virginia, United States

- U.S. National Register of Historic Places
- Virginia Landmarks Register
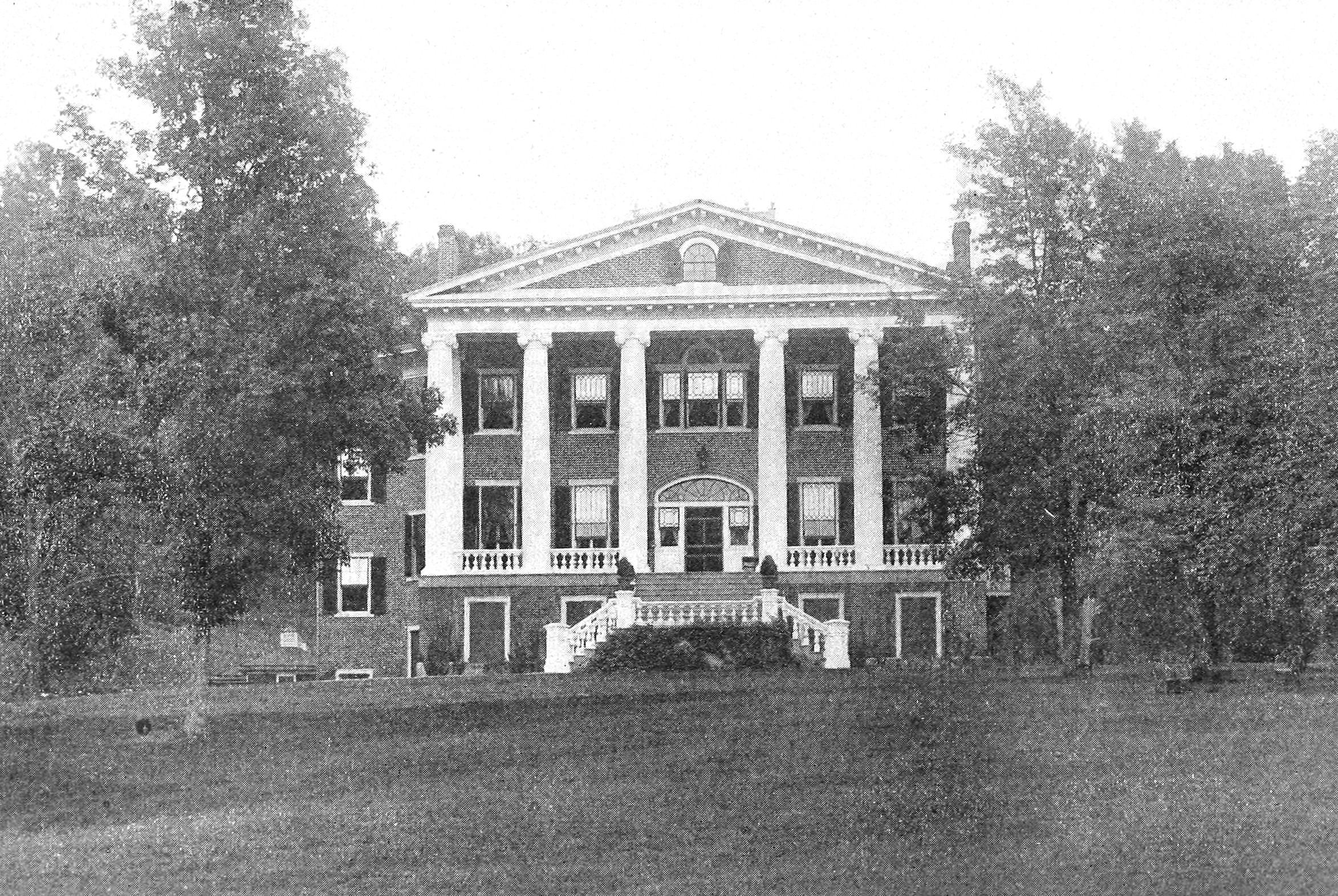

- Location within Virginia Location within the United States
- Location: N of Gordonsville on VA 231, near Gordonsville, Virginia
- Coordinates: 38°10′36″N 78°11′16″W
- Area: 1,000.7 acres (405.0 ha)
- Built: c. 1905, 1933-1935
- Architect: Bottomley, William L.; Innocenti, Umberto
- Architectural style: Georgian Revival, Federal, Adamesque
- NRHP reference No.: 82004578
- VLR No.: 068-0181

Significant dates
- Added to NRHP: September 23, 1982
- Designated VLR: July 20, 1982

Rocklands is a historic home and farm complex located near Gordonsville, Orange County, Virginia. The house was built about 1905, and underwent a major renovation under the direction of William Lawrence Bottomley in 1933–1935. It is a 2 1/2-story, five-bay, Georgian Revival style brick dwelling with a hipped roof. The front facade features a monumental Ionic order hexastyle portico. Also on the property are the contributing guest house (c. 1905, 1935); a small service court designed by Bottomley and consisting of a garage, servant's house, woodshed, and tunnel; a 19th-century coach barn of wood-frame construction; the mid-19th century farm manager's house; Spencer Neale, Jr., Residence (c. 1900); bank barn (c. 1910); and a brick house (1822).

It was listed on the National Register of Historic Places in 2005.
