= Newton White Mansion =

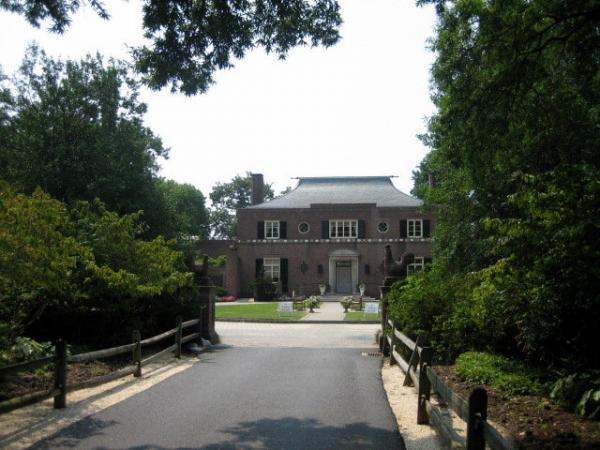
- Newton White Mansion in August 2007

- Location within Maryland Location within the United States
- Location: 2708 Enterprise Road, Mitchellville, Maryland 20721
- Coordinates: 38°55′40″N 76°48′50″W

The Newton White Mansion is a Neo-Georgian home was built in 1939 by architect William Lawrence Bottomley for Captain Newton H. White of the United States Navy. Captain White had a long and distinguished career, serving on the USS Yorktown, the USS Lexington, and, prior to World War II, as the first commanding officer of the USS Enterprise.

At one time the centerpiece of a 586-acre (2.37 km^{2}) dairy farm, the house and grounds (known locally as the Enterprise Estate) are now entirely surrounded by the Enterprise Golf Course.

== Gallery ==
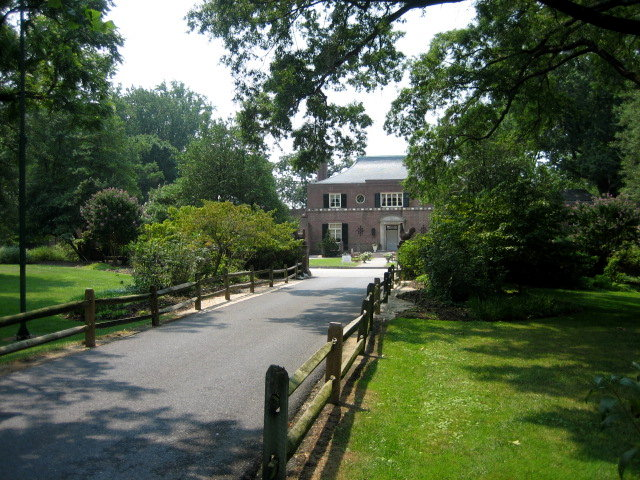

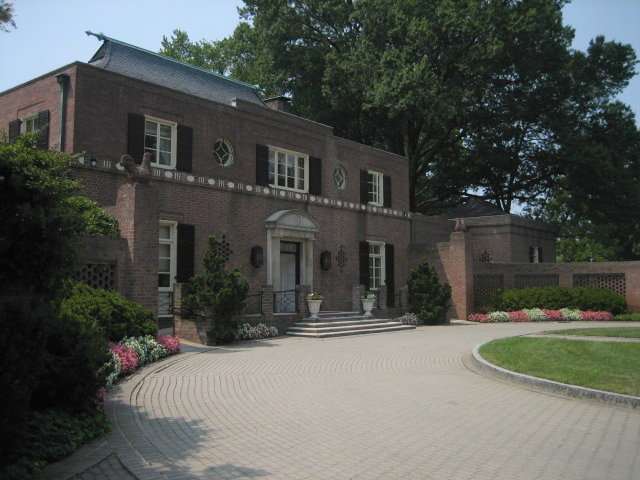

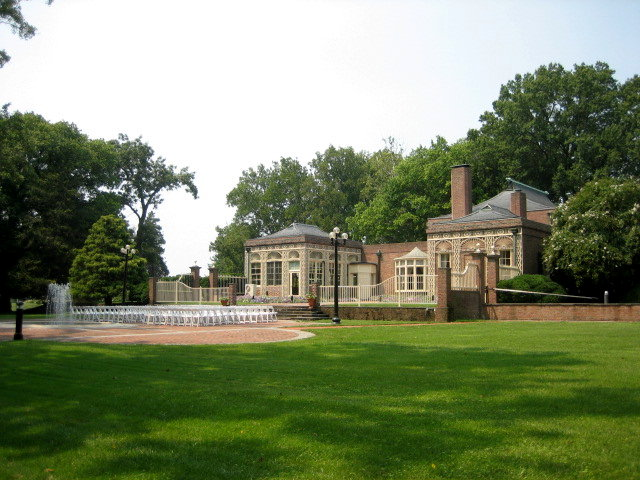
