= Beaton–Powell House =

Historic house in Virginia, United States

- U.S. National Register of Historic Places
- Virginia Landmarks Register
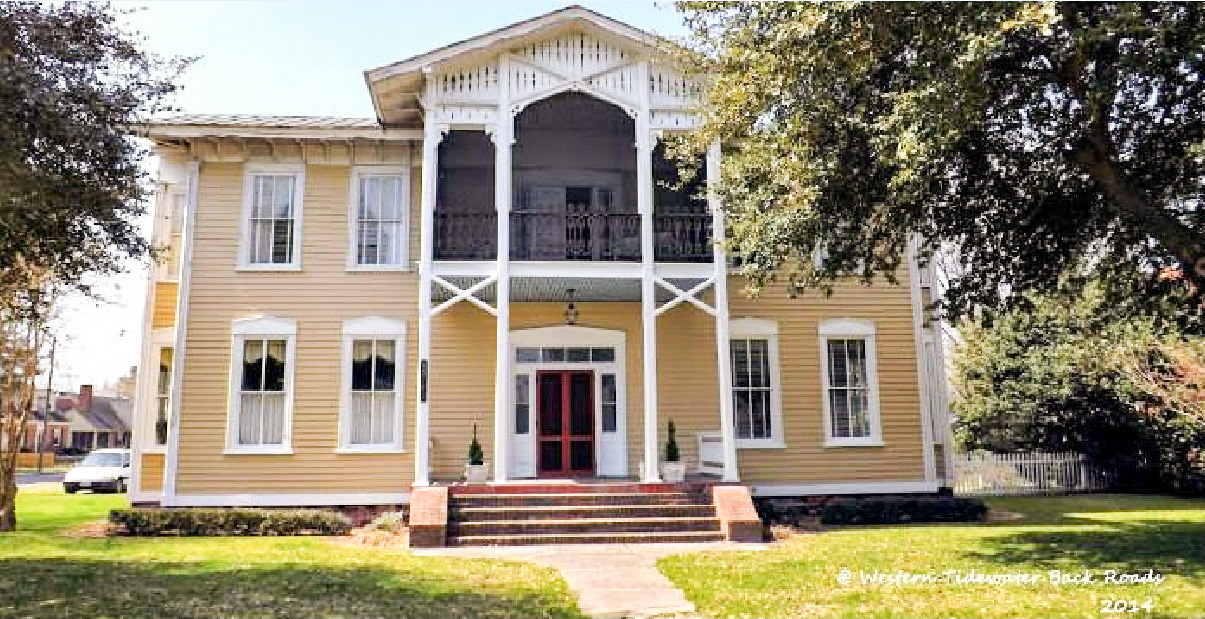

- Location within Virginia Location within the United States
- Location: 32142 South Main St., Boykins, Virginia
- Coordinates: 36°34′59″N 77°12′3″W
- Area: less than one acre
- Built: 1857
- Architectural style: Greek Revival, Italianate
- NRHP reference No.: 08001058
- VLR No.: 174-5002-0016

Significant dates
- Added to NRHP: November 14, 2008
- Designated VLR: September 18, 2008

Beaton–Powell House, also known as Home Place, is a historic plantation house located at Boykins, Southampton County, Virginia. It was built in 1857, and is a two-story, Greek Revival style, timber frame dwelling with Italianate style embellishments. It features a massive, elaborate two-tiered central portico supported by three conspicuous diagonal braces link together four paired, seven-inch square chamfered columns.

It was listed on the National Register of Historic Places in 2008.
