= Dakota (Warrenton, Virginia) =

Historic house in Virginia, United States

- U.S. National Register of Historic Places
- Virginia Landmarks Register
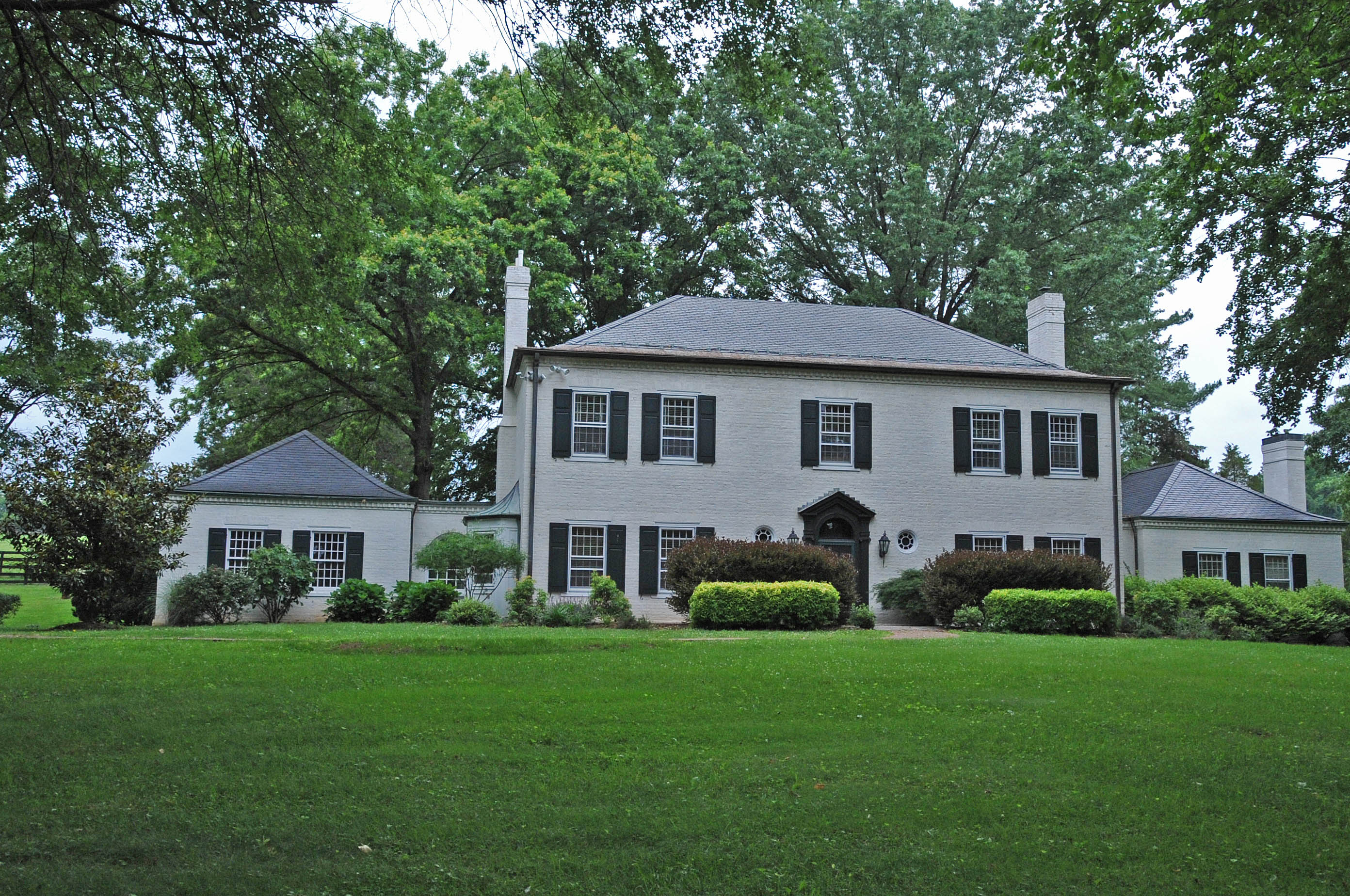

- Location within Northern Virginia Location within Virginia Location within the United States
- Location: 8134 Springs Rd., near Warrenton, Virginia
- Coordinates: 38°42′19″N 77°48′25″W
- Area: 5 acres (2.0 ha)
- Built: 1928
- Architect: Bottomley, William Lawrence; et al.
- Architectural style: Colonial Revival, Queen Anne
- NRHP reference No.: 05000768
- VLR No.: 030-0300

Significant dates
- Added to NRHP: July 27, 2005
- Designated VLR: June 1, 2005

Dakota is a historic home located near Warrenton, Fauquier County, Virginia. The house was designed by architect William Lawrence Bottomley and built in 1928. It is a two-story, Colonial Revival style dwelling. It has brick facing over a masonry block core; a slate-shingled hipped roof; and a symmetrical five-bay facade with a centered entry with a classical surround. A one-story bedroom wing was added to the right of the house in 1948 and garage addition was added to the left of the house in 1948. Also on the property are the contributing original garage and a stable building. Dakota is located near the site of the former Horse Show Grounds outside of Warrenton.

It was listed on the National Register of Historic Places in 2005.
