= 1837 Suffolk head-on collision =

First fatal head-on rail collision

1837 Suffolk Head-on Collision
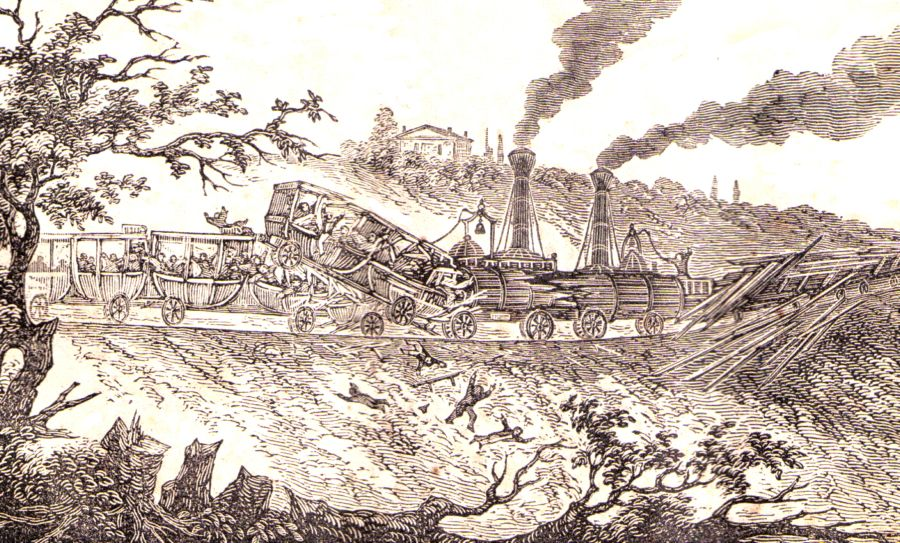
- Engraving of the accident

Details
- Date: August 11, 1837; 8:00 a.m.
- Location: Suffolk, Virginia
- Coordinates: 36°43′21″N 76°36′49″W
- Line: Seaboard and Roanoke Railroad
- Incident type: Head-on collision
- Cause: Human error

Statistics
- Trains: 2
- Passengers: 200
- Deaths: 3 (plus one indirectly)
- Injured: 43+

The 1837 Suffolk head-on collision was the first ever head-on train collision to result in fatalities. The accident occurred on August 11, 1837 in Suffolk, Virginia, United States.

== Background ==
In 1835, the Portsmouth & Roanoke Railroad (later renamed the Seaboard Railroad) established a rail through Suffolk. At the time, rail travel was still an emerging form of transporting passengers, but the line found usage in transporting freight, such as tobacco and lumber.

The accident itself was not the first recorded instance of a head-on collision on the rails. In 1836, a collision on the Camden & Amboy line had been caused due to a heavy fog; while the accident itself did result in minor bruises for some of the passengers, no official injuries were reported. The majority of head-on collisions at this time were often at slow speeds and no more than a sudden jolt.

By 1837, the line was being used for a combination of freight and passenger transport.

== Accident ==
On August 11, 1837, the railway line was being used by separate trains, both heading in the same direction. The eastbound train was a lumber train, while the other train was a passenger express containing "thirteen stagecoach-like coaches", and carrying 200 people who were returning from a steamboat trip.

The trains were traveling at an estimated speed between 12 and 20 miles per hour. The passenger train had just made a stop near Goodwin's Landing (the residence of one of the locals at the time) before reaching a curved, upward embankment. The freight train, going downward, was carrying 15 cars and had passed a turnout which was a necessary requirement as the freight train was supposed to yield. While the embankment itself was only 35 feet high, only the engineer of the passenger train managed to brake in time.

When the train collided, the first three coaches on the passenger train suffered the greatest impact. The first passenger coach began to telescope the second coach resulting in the majority of the casualties. The newspaper The Native American listed the dead as Elizabeth McClenny, Margaret Roberts, and Jemima Ely. The dead and injured were taken back to Goodwin's Landing, accompanying as many that could fit in the house.

In the immediate aftermath of the accident, a rescue train, already headed to Suffolk, was dispatched to assist with the collision, but ran over two more people (killing one) as the result of a snowstorm.

== Aftermath ==
An engraving of the accident was created in 1840 for the book Steamboat Disasters and Railroad Accidents. The official casualty list (as listed in the book) was that four had died (one as a result of getting run over by the rescue train), thirteen were severely wounded, and that thirty or more had been slightly injured.

An inquiry placed the blame of the accident on the freight engineer for his failure to yield.
