= Waverly Hill =

Historic house in Virginia, United States

- U.S. National Register of Historic Places
- Virginia Landmarks Register
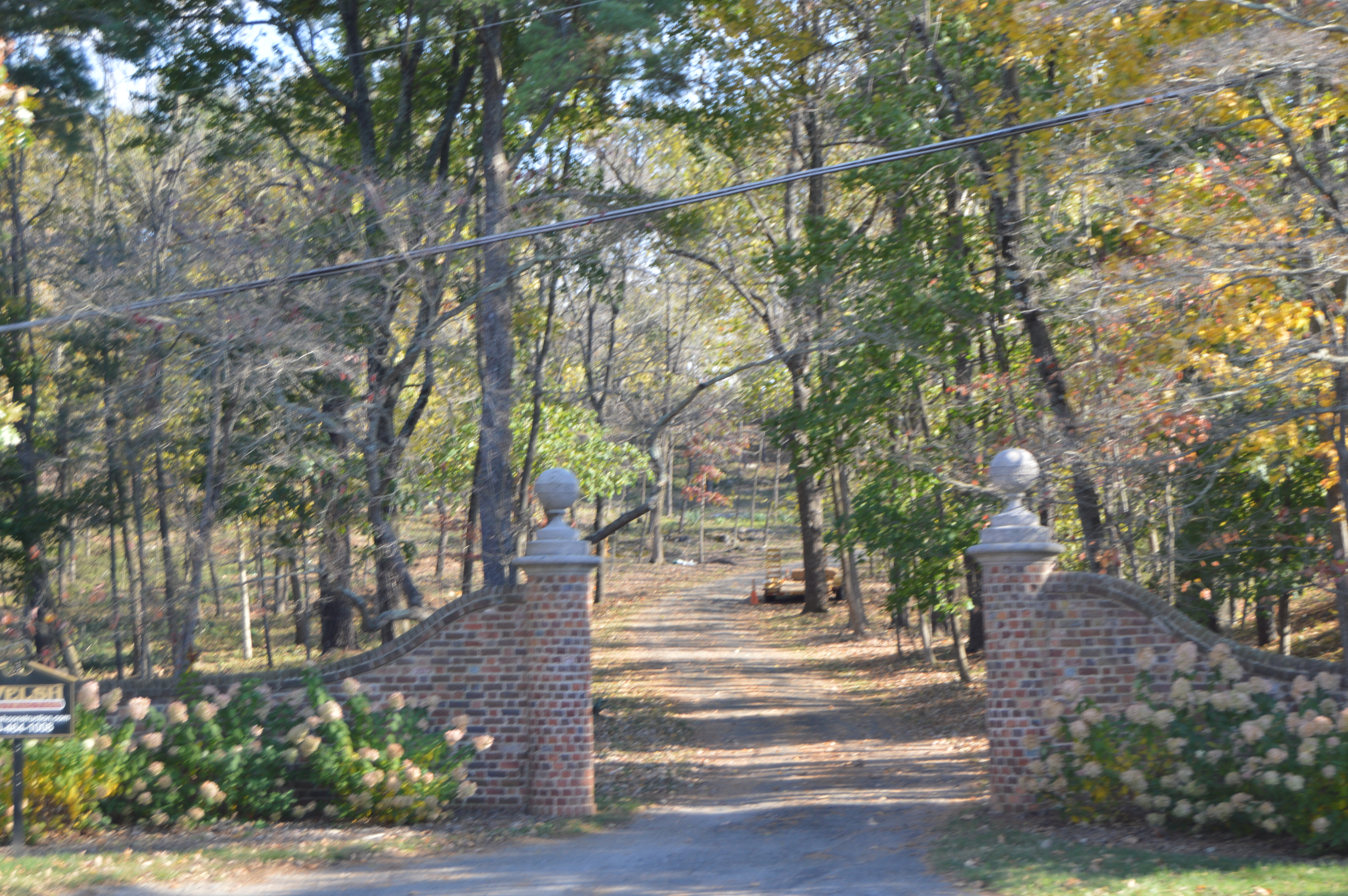
- Gateway to the estate

- Location within Virginia Location within the United States
- Location: 3001 N. Augusta St., Staunton, Virginia
- Coordinates: 38°10′11″N 79°2′38″W
- Area: 25.7 acres (10.4 ha)
- Built: 1929
- Architect: Bottomley, William Lawrence
- Architectural style: Georgian Revival
- NRHP reference No.: 82004604
- VLR No.: 132-0029

Significant dates
- Added to NRHP: July 8, 1982
- Designated VLR: February 16, 1982

Waverly Hill is a historic mansion located at Staunton, Virginia. It was designed by architect William Lawrence Bottomley (1883–1951) and built in 1929. It consists of a 2 1/2–story, five-bay, center section flanked by one-story wings connected by low, one-story hyphens in the Georgian Revival style. The house is constructed of brick, and the central section and wings are topped by slate-covered hipped roofs.

It was added to the National Register of Historic Places in 1982.
