= Grace Episcopal Church (Weldon, North Carolina) =

Historic church in North Carolina, United States

- U.S. National Register of Historic Places
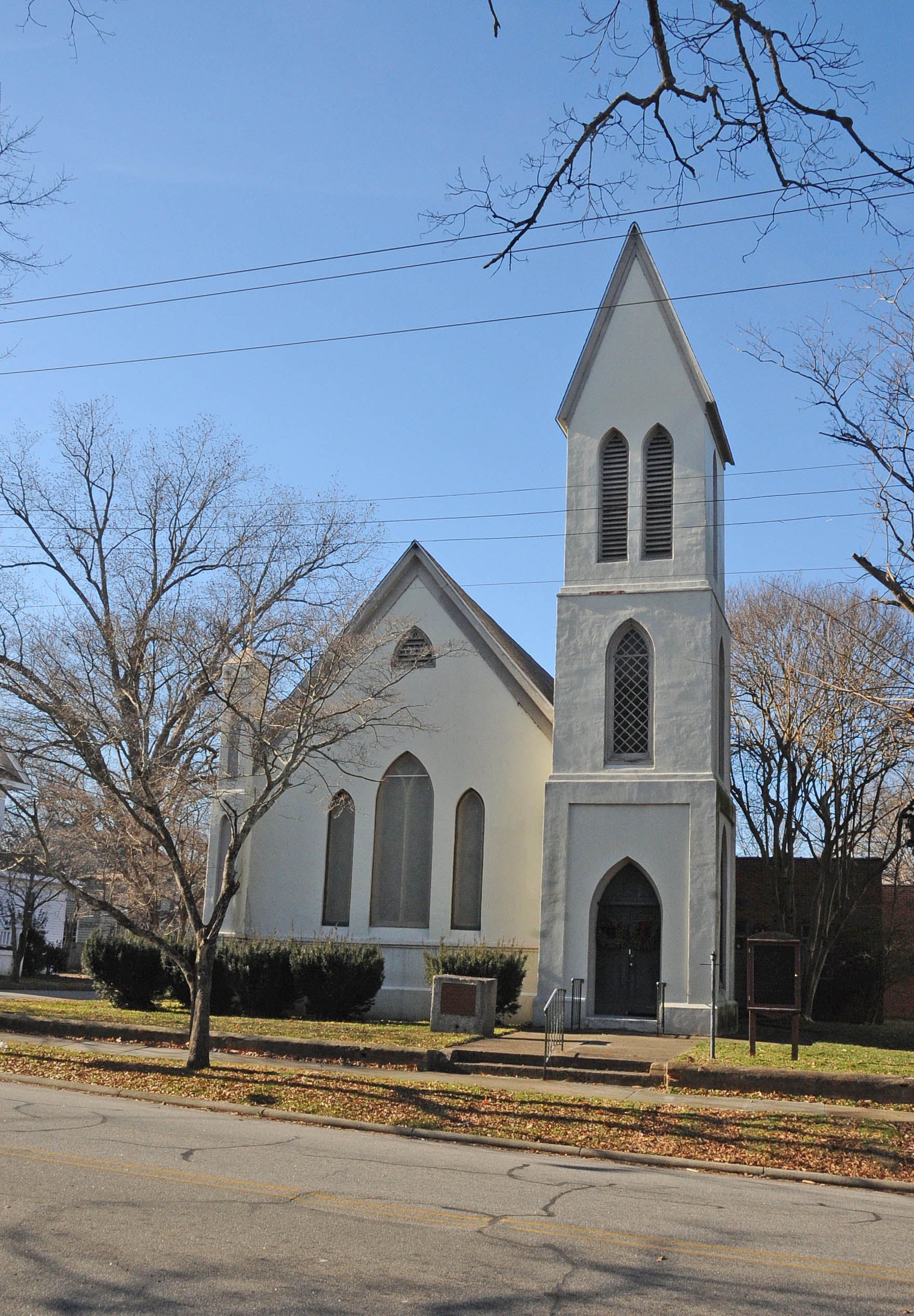

- Location within North Carolina Location within the United States
- Location: 416 Washington Ave., Weldon, North Carolina
- Coordinates: 36°25′31″N 77°35′57″W
- Area: less than one acre
- Built: 1872-1889
- Architectural style: Gothic
- NRHP reference No.: 91001493
- Added to NRHP: October 01, 1991

Grace Episcopal Church is a historic Episcopal church located at 416 Washington Avenue in Weldon, Halifax County, North Carolina. It was built between 1872 and 1889, and is a rectangular Gothic Revival-style stuccoed brick building. It has a steep gable roof, three-stage bell tower, two-stage buttress with capped pinnacle, and lancet windows.

It was listed on the National Register of Historic Places in 1991.
