= Carrsville, Virginia =

- Census-designated place
- Location within Virginia Location within the United States
- Coordinates: 36°42′47″N 76°49′59″W
- Country: United States
- State: Virginia
- County: Isle of Wight

Area
  - Total: 3.22 sq mi (8.34 km^{2})
  - Land: 3.20 sq mi (8.28 km^{2})
  - Water: 0.023 sq mi (0.06 km^{2})
- Elevation: 69 ft (21 m)

Population (2010)
  - Total: 359
  - Density: 112/sq mi (43.3/km^{2})
- Time zone: UTC−5 (Eastern (EST))
  - Summer (DST): UTC−4 (EDT)
- ZIP code: 23315
- FIPS code: 51-13192
- GNIS feature ID: 1495353

Carrsville is a census-designated place (CDP) in Isle of Wight County in the Hampton Roads region of southeastern Virginia, United States. As of the 2020 census, Carrsville had a population of 346. The town is named for Jesse Carr, whose family had long roots in Isle of Wight County. Jesse Carr died in the place that would later bear his name.

== History ==
Carrsville was located on the Portsmouth and Roanoke Railroad, built through the area in the mid-1830s to provide a link between the Roanoke River and the port areas of Norfolk and Portsmouth. The railroad is now part of CSX Transportation.

=== Civil War ===
According to Civil War Encyclopedia, on November 17, 1862, 150 Union soldiers encountered and fought with 400 Confederate cavalry between Carrsville and Holland's corners. No casualties were reported.

In May, 1862, Union forces controlled Norfolk and Portsmouth, Virginia. The Union army had a garrison at Suffolk, fifteen miles east of Carrsville. Between April 11 and May 4, 1863, Lt. General James Longstreet, leading three Confederate divisions, unsuccessfully attempted to capture this garrison in what became the Siege of Suffolk.

Approximately five miles west of Carrsville is the Blackwater River where 9,000 Confederate soldiers were dug in for 50 miles stretching from north of Zuni to the North Carolina line.

After the Siege of Suffolk ended, Union troops under VII Corps were sent to Carrsville to cover the construction of a section of the Seaboard & Roanoke Railroad from Suffolk to the Blackwater River. 36 miles of railroad were completed between May 12–26.

During the construction, on May 15, 1863, Union soldiers encountered confederate military resistance near the Holland House. Confederates fired approximately sixty shot and shell at the railroad before advancing and being, “driven back with heavy loss.”

The VII Corps regiments at Carrsville were the 6th Regiment Massachusetts Volunteer Militia, 7th Massachusetts Infantry Regiment, 112th Regiment, New York Infantry, 170th New York Infantry Regiment, 182nd New York Infantry Regiment, 165th Pennsylvania Regiment, and the 167th Pennsylvania Infantry Regiment.

In the Battle of Carrsville, also known as the Battle of Holland House, five soldiers in the 6th Regiment Massachusetts were killed, twelve were wounded and five were taken prisoner.

“For his heroic service at Carrsville Private Joseph Sewell-Gerrish Sweatt of Company C, 6th Regiment Massachusetts, was awarded the Congressional Medal of Honor. “When ordered to retreat, this soldier turned and rushed back to the front, in the face of heavy fire from the enemy, in an endeavor to rescue his wounded comrades, remaining by them until overpowered and taken prisoner.”

Charles H. Bushee of Company E, 112th Regiment, New York Infantry, wrote in his diary about there being, “a sharp skirmish,” in Carrsville on May 14, 15, and 16, 1863.

In his Tidewater News article, Civil War history, battlefields are all around us, Volpe Boykin wrote that the Carrsville Elementary School on Route 58 was the, “area between the battle lines of Union and Confederate infantry and artillery.”

Boykin wrote that Private Anson Thurston and his father, Joel Thurston, both served in the 6th Regiment Massachusetts, and were wounded and captured at Carrsville and brought to Franklin where the younger Thurston died from his wounds. The elder Thurston was then sent to a prison in Richmond.

=== Modern natural preserves ===
For more than the past quarter century, Old Dominion University has operated the approximately 300 acre Blackwater Ecological Preserve in Carrsville, cooperating with the Virginia Department of Conservation and Natural Resources. That preserve is part of the approximately 1000 acre Zuni Pine Barrens Natural Area, rare ecological habitat in Virginia preserved four decades ago. DCR is re-establishing native longleaf pine in the area, which had been burned in pits for four centuries to create turpentine and other naval stores, although only a small number of old mature trees remained at the time of acquisition. DCR also operates the 350 acre Antioch Pines Natural Area Preserve nearby, which has Loblolly pines, as well as rare plant species in the dry sandhill community. It is known for birding opportunities as well as wildflowers in the transition zone between the sandhill and marsh ecosystesm.

== Geography ==
Carrsville is in southern Isle of Wight County, bordered to the southeast by the independent city of Suffolk. U.S. Route 58 Business passes through the center of the community, leading west 6 miles (10 km) to Franklin and east 15 miles (24 km) to the center of Suffolk. Downtown Norfolk is 36 miles (58 km) east of Carrsville.

According to the U.S. Census Bureau, the Carrsville CDP has a total area of 3.22 square miles (8.34 km^{2}), of which 3.20 square miles (8.28 km^{2}) is land and 0.02 square miles (0.06 km^{2}), or 0.66%, are water.

== Demographics ==
Historical population
Census	Pop.	Note	%±
2010	359		—
2020	346		−3.6%
U.S. Decennial Census; 2010 2020

Carrsville was first listed as a census designated place in the 2010 U.S. census.

=== Racial and ethnic composition ===
Carrsville CDP, Virginia – Racial and ethnic composition Note: the US Census treats Hispanic/Latino as an ethnic category. This table excludes Latinos from the racial categories and assigns them to a separate category. Hispanics/Latinos may be of any race.
Race / Ethnicity (NH = Non-Hispanic)	Pop 2010	Pop 2020	% 2010	% 2020
White alone (NH)	273	269	76.04%	77.75%
Black or African American alone (NH)	77	51	21.45%	14.74%
Native American or Alaska Native alone (NH)	1	0	0.28%	0.00%
Asian alone (NH)	0	1	0.00%	0.29%
Native Hawaiian or Pacific Islander alone (NH)	0	0	0.00%	0.00%
Other race alone (NH)	0	1	0.00%	0.29%
Mixed race or Multiracial (NH)	1	12	0.28%	3.47%
Hispanic or Latino (any race)	7	12	1.95%	3.47%
Total	359	346	100.00%	100.00%

== Climate ==
The climate in this area is characterized by hot, humid summers and generally mild to cool winters. According to the Köppen Climate Classification system, Carrsville has a humid subtropical climate, abbreviated "Cfa" on climate maps.
