= Roanoke Canal =

Canal in Halifax County, North Carolina

- U.S. National Register of Historic Places
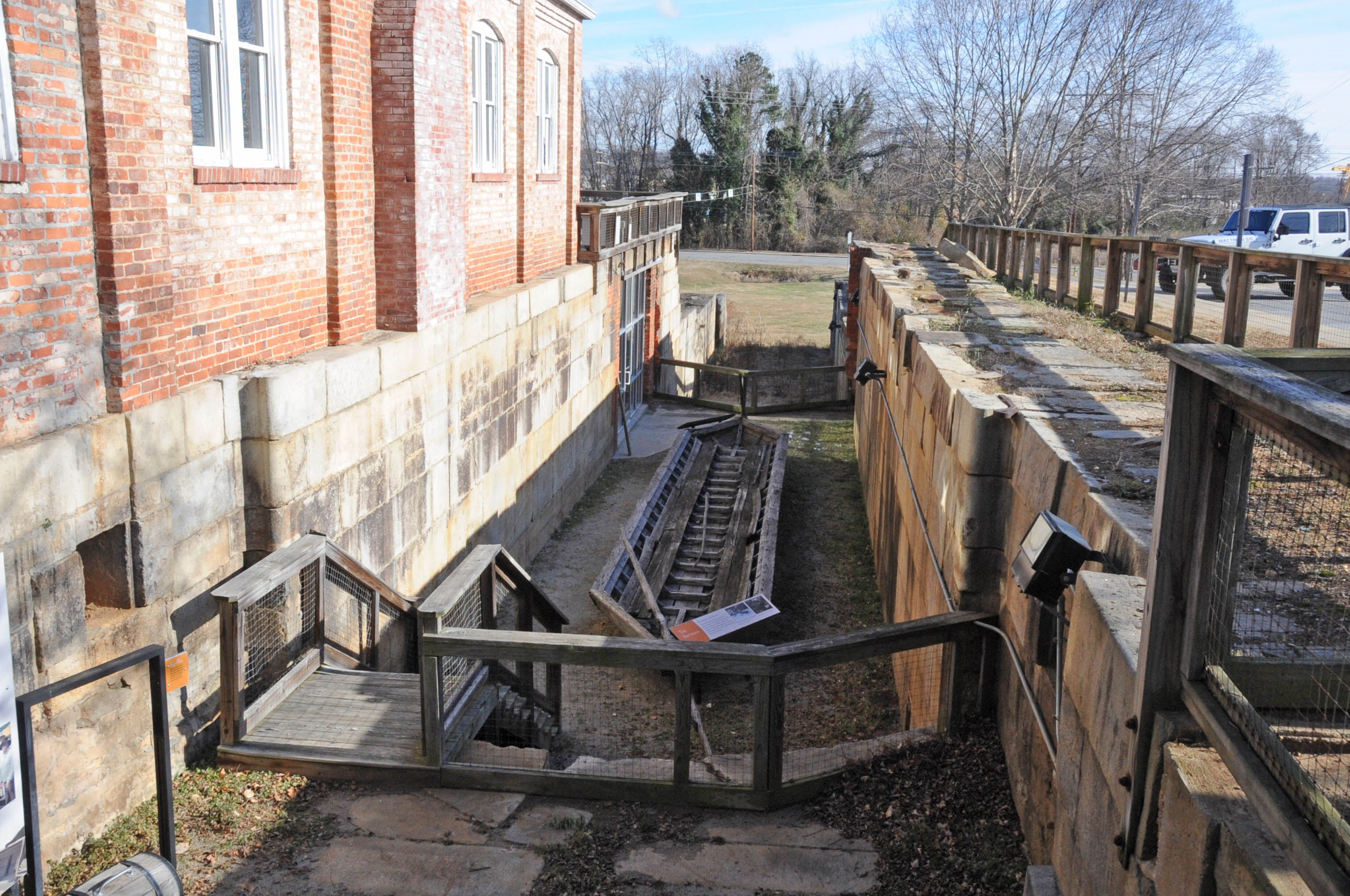

- Location within North Carolina Location within the United States
- Location: Roanoke Rapids Lake SE to Weldon, near Roanoke Rapids, North Carolina
- Coordinates: 36°27′01″N 77°37′54″W
- Area: 140 acres (57 ha)
- Built: 1819-1823, 1892, c. 1904
- Architect: Fulton, Hamilton
- NRHP reference No.: 76001328
- Added to NRHP: October 8, 1976

Roanoke Canal is a historic canal located near Roanoke Rapids, Halifax County, North Carolina. It was built as part of the Roanoke Navigation System and extends from Roanoke Rapids Lake southeast seven miles to the canal's return into the Roanoke River at Weldon, North Carolina. The Roanoke Navigation System was planned to connect the Blue Ridge Mountains and the Atlantic Ocean. The earliest sections were built under the direction of civil engineer Hamilton Fulton. Extant structures include the middle or lift locks, the aqueduct (1821-1823), and the three-story brick mill (1892) and powerhouse (c. 1904).

It was listed on the National Register of Historic Places in 1976.
