= Branchville, Virginia =

- Town
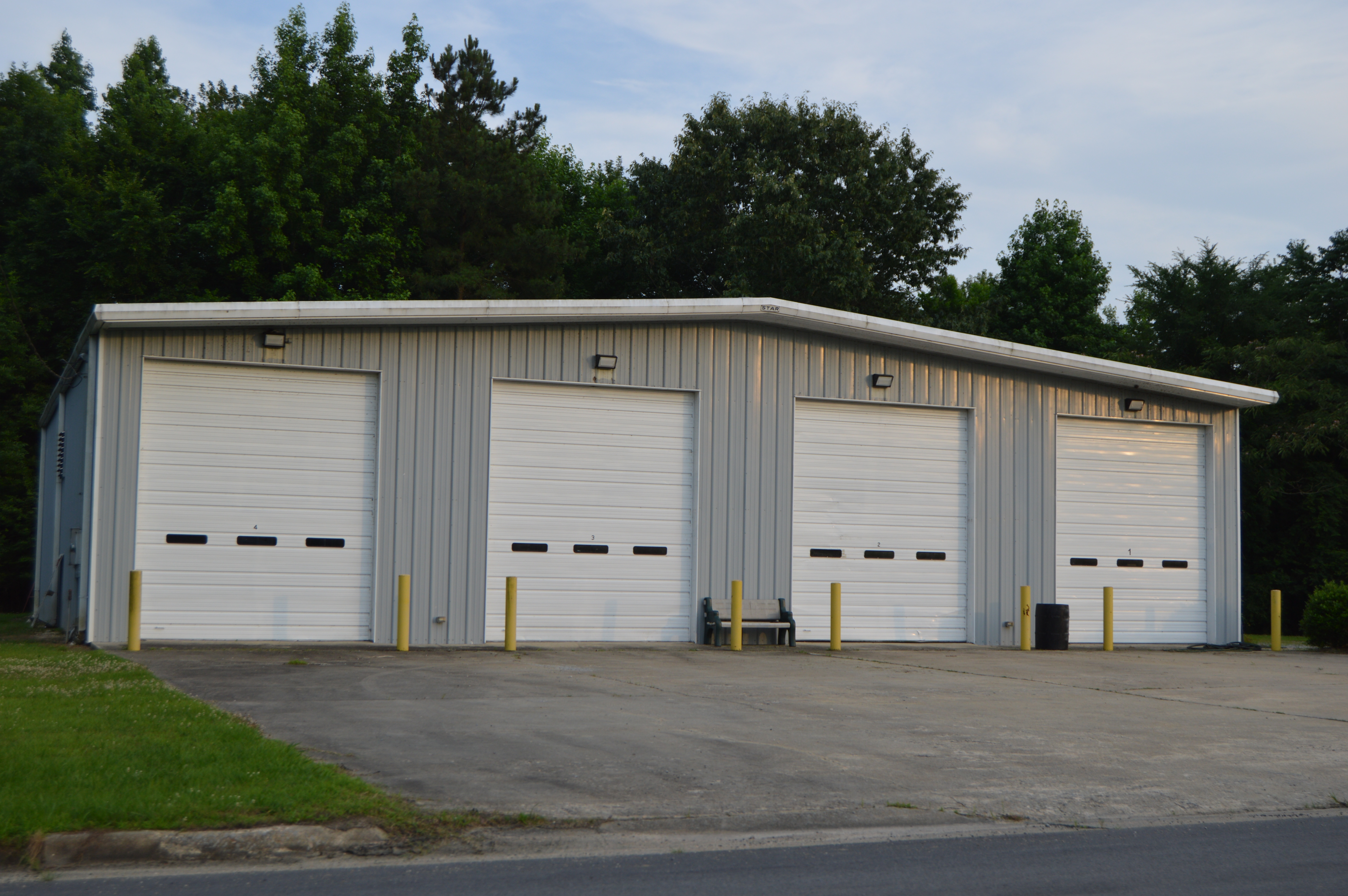
- Town hall and fire station

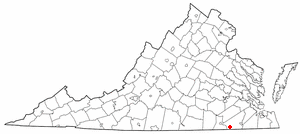
- Location of Branchville, Virginia
- Coordinates: 36°34′9″N 77°14′56″W
- Country: United States
- State: Virginia
- County: Southampton

Area
  - Total: 0.43 sq mi (1.11 km^{2})
  - Land: 0.43 sq mi (1.11 km^{2})
  - Water: 0 sq mi (0.00 km^{2})
- Elevation: 43 ft (13 m)

Population (2020)
  - Total: 118
  - Estimate (2019): 115
  - Density: 269.4/sq mi (104.02/km^{2})
- Time zone: UTC−5 (Eastern (EST))
  - Summer (DST): UTC−4 (EDT)
- ZIP code: 23828
- Area codes: 757, 948
- FIPS code: 51-09208
- GNIS feature ID: 1463757

Branchville is a town in Southampton County, Virginia, United States. The population was 118 at the 2020 census.

== Geography ==
Branchville is located at 36°34′9″N 77°14′56″W (36.569266, −77.248997).

According to the United States Census Bureau, the town has a total area of 0.4 square mile (1.1 km^{2}), all land.

== Demographics ==
Historical population
Census	Pop.	Note	%±
1910	239		—
1920	148		−38.1%
1930	161		8.8%
1940	153		−5.0%
1950	169		10.5%
1960	158		−6.5%
1970	189		19.6%
1980	174		−7.9%
1990	55		−68.4%
2000	123		123.6%
2010	114		−7.3%
2020	118		3.5%
U.S. Decennial Census

At the 2000 census there were 123 people, 50 households, and 36 families living in the town. The population density was 281.9 people per square mile (107.9/km^{2}). There were 56 housing units at an average density of 128.4 per square mile (49.1/km^{2}). The racial makeup of the town was 67.48% White, 30.89% African American, 0.81% Asian, and 0.81% from two or more races. Of the 50 households 32.0% had children under the age of 18 living with them, 52.0% were married couples living together, 20.0% had a female householder with no husband present, and 28.0% were non-families. 26.0% of households were one person and 24.0% were one person aged 65 or older. The average household size was 2.46 and the average family size was 2.97.

The age distribution was 24.4% under the age of 18, 5.7% from 18 to 24, 23.6% from 25 to 44, 23.6% from 45 to 64, and 22.8% 65 or older. The median age was 44 years. For every 100 females, there were 75.7 males. For every 100 females age 18 and over, there were 63.2 males.

The median household income was $24,844 and the median family income was $32,917. Males had a median income of $21,250 versus $19,583 for females. The per capita income for the town was $11,985. There were no families and 4.6% of the population living below the poverty line, including no under eighteens and 15.8% of those over 64.
