= Weldon, North Carolina =

- Town
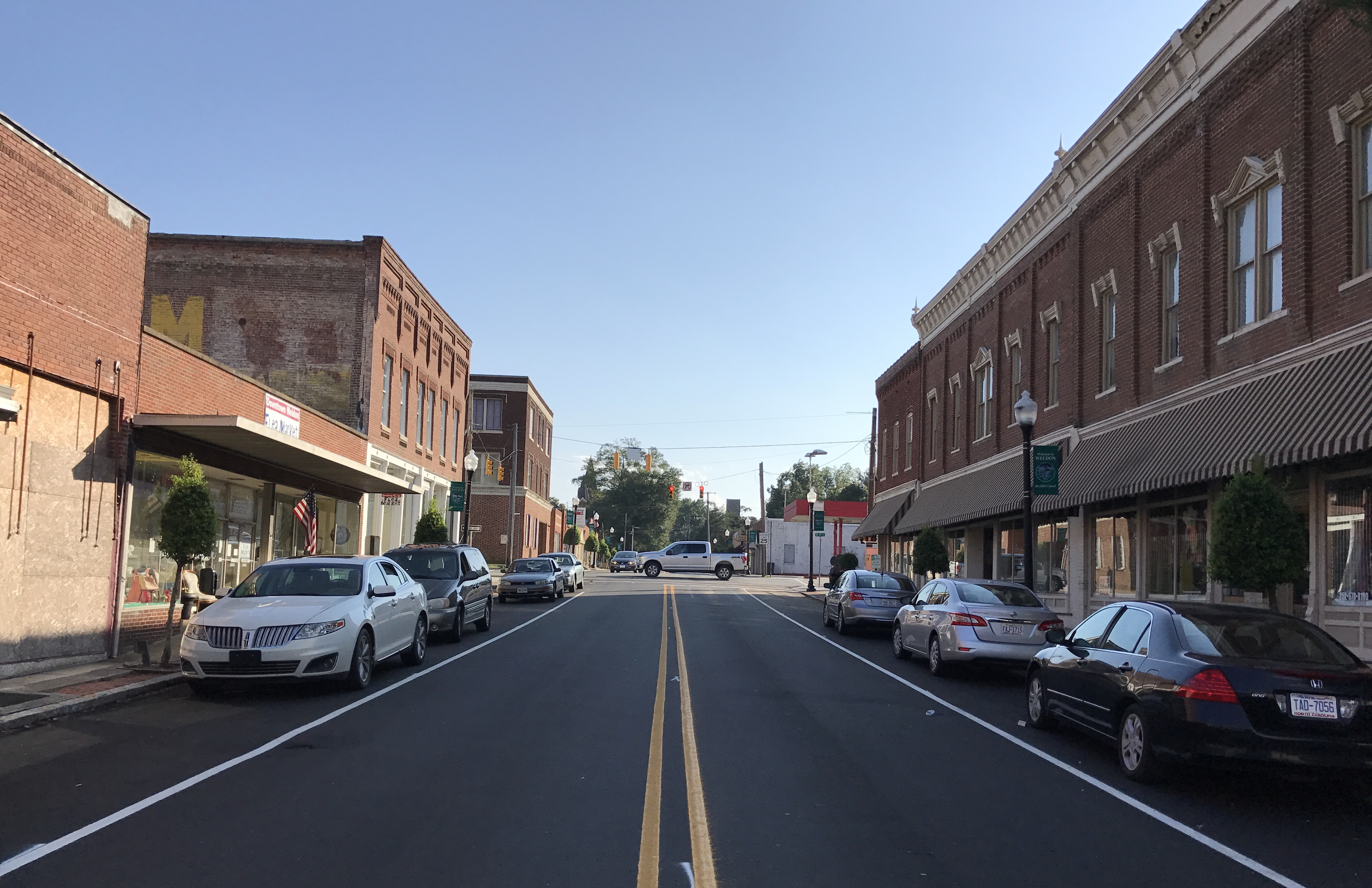
- Southbound on Washington Avenue between Second and Third Streets.

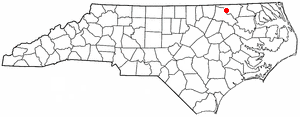
- Location of Weldon, North Carolina
- Coordinates: 36°25′26″N 77°36′47″W
- Country: United States
- State: North Carolina
- County: Halifax

Area
  - Total: 2.92 sq mi (7.55 km^{2})
  - Land: 2.92 sq mi (7.55 km^{2})
  - Water: 0 sq mi (0.00 km^{2})
- Elevation: 98 ft (30 m)

Population (2020)
  - Total: 1,444
  - Density: 495/sq mi (191.2/km^{2})
- Time zone: UTC-5 (Eastern (EST))
  - Summer (DST): UTC-4 (EDT)
- ZIP code: 27890
- Area code: 252
- FIPS code: 37-71780
- GNIS feature ID: 2406855
- Website: www.historicweldonnc.com

Weldon is a town in Halifax County, North Carolina, United States. As of the 2020 census, Weldon had a population of 1,444. It is part of the Roanoke Rapids, North Carolina Micropolitan Statistical Area.

== History ==
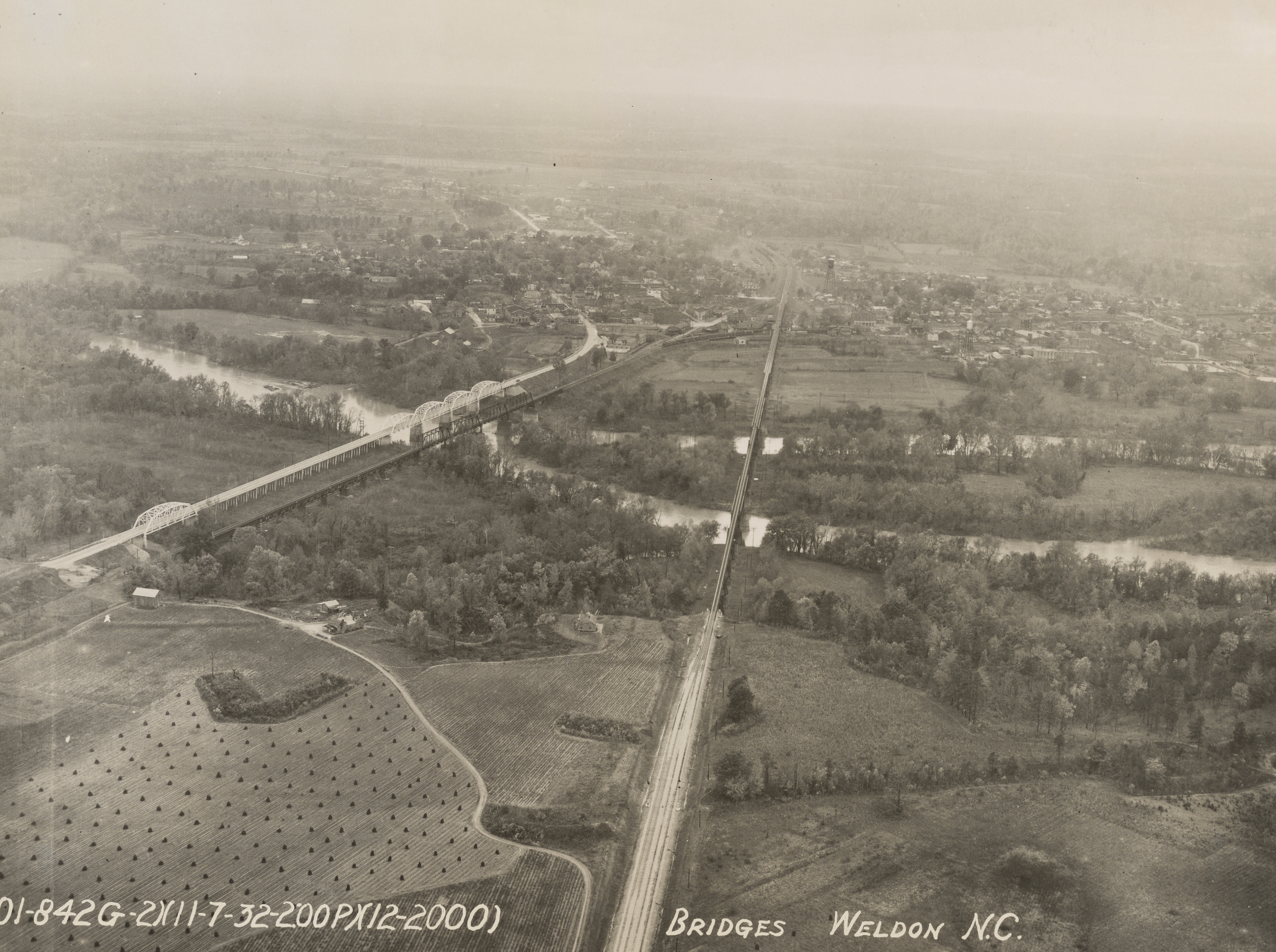
Bridges crossing the Roanoke River 1932

In 1752, Daniel Weldon purchased 1,273 acres of land on the Roanoke River. His plantation became known as Weldon's Landing. As it was just below the fall line, Weldon's Landing was the westernmost point of navigation along the Roanoke.

The Roanoke Canal was built in 1823 to bypass the rapids and open up trade to Virginia. The aqueduct across Chockoyotte creek was built near Weldon's Landing, bringing an economic boom to the area. The canal is now dry, and is a hiking trail open to the public.

Weldon was the first railroad hub in the American South. The Seaboard and Roanoke Railroad terminated in Weldon. In 1841, the Wilmington and Weldon Railroad was completed, also terminating in Weldon. At the time, it was the longest railroad in the world. This led to the incorporation of the town in 1843.

The Petersburg and Roanoke Railroad in 1848 and the Raleigh and Gaston Railroad in 1853 both extended to terminate in Weldon.

During the Civil War, both railroad bridges over the Roanoke were burned. Only the Seaboard and Roanoke rebuilt their bridge.

Grace Episcopal Church and the Weldon Historic District are listed on the National Register of Historic Places.

== Geography ==
Weldon is located in northern Halifax County and is bordered to the west by Roanoke Rapids, the county's largest community, and to the north by Northampton County, across the Roanoke River.

U.S. Route 301 passes through the town, leading south 38 miles (61 km) to Rocky Mount and north 19 miles (31 km) to Emporia, Virginia. U.S. Route 158 runs east–west through the town, connecting the downtown area with Interstate 95 at the town's western border. US 158 leads east 29 miles (47 km) to Murfreesboro and west 4 miles (6 km) into the southern part of Roanoke Rapids. Interstate 95 leads north to Emporia and south to Rocky Mount, providing a highway alternative to US 301.

Located on the Roanoke River, Weldon calls itself the "Rockfish Capital of the World" due to abundant fishing during the May spawning season.

According to the United States Census Bureau, the town has a total area of 2.9 square miles (7.4 km^{2}), all land.

== Demographics ==
Historical population
Census	Pop.	Note	%±
1870	208		—
1880	932		348.1%
1890	1,286		38.0%
1900	1,433		11.4%
1910	1,999		39.5%
1920	1,872		−6.4%
1930	2,323		24.1%
1940	2,341		0.8%
1950	2,295		−2.0%
1960	2,165		−5.7%
1970	2,304		6.4%
1980	1,844		−20.0%
1990	1,392		−24.5%
2000	1,374		−1.3%
2010	1,655		20.5%
2020	1,444		−12.7%
U.S. Decennial Census

=== Racial and ethnic composition ===
Weldon town, North Carolina – Racial and ethnic composition Note: the US Census treats Hispanic/Latino as an ethnic category. This table excludes Latinos from the racial categories and assigns them to a separate category. Hispanics/Latinos may be of any race.
Race / Ethnicity (NH = Non-Hispanic)	Pop 2000	Pop 2010	Pop 2020	% 2000	% 2010	% 2020
White alone (NH)	493	418	307	35.88%	25.26%	21.26%
Black or African American alone (NH)	860	1,168	1,053	62.59%	70.57%	72.92%
Native American or Alaska Native alone (NH)	1	5	11	0.07%	0.30%	0.76%
Asian alone (NH)	1	7	2	0.07%	0.42%	0.14%
Native Hawaiian or Pacific Islander alone (NH)	0	0	2	0.00%	0.00%	0.14%
Other race alone (NH)	0	0	9	0.00%	0.00%	0.62%
Mixed race or Multiracial (NH)	8	39	33	0.58%	2.36%	2.29%
Hispanic or Latino (any race)	11	18	27	0.80%	1.09%	1.87%
Total	1,374	1,655	1,444	100.00%	100.00%	100.00%

=== 2020 census ===
As of the 2020 United States census, there were 1,444 people, 656 households, and 472 families residing in the town.

=== 2000 census ===
As of the census of 2000, there were 1,374 people, 532 households, and 358 families residing in the town. The population density was 775.5 people per square mile (299.4 people/km^{2}). There were 624 housing units at an average density of 352.2 per square mile (136.0/km^{2}). The racial makeup of the town was 36.17% White, 62.74% African American, 0.15% Native American, 0.07% Asian, 0.07% Pacific Islander, 0.07% from other races, and 0.73% from two or more races. Hispanic or Latino of any race were 0.80% of the population.

There were 532 households, out of which 26.5% had children under the age of 18 living with them, 40.4% were married couples living together, 22.6% had a female householder with no husband present, and 32.7% were non-families. 30.3% of all households were made up of individuals, and 17.5% had someone living alone who was 65 years of age or older. The average household size was 2.46 and the average family size was 3.05.

In the town, the population was spread out, with 24.4% under the age of 18, 7.1% from 18 to 24, 22.9% from 25 to 44, 22.1% from 45 to 64, and 23.5% who were 65 years of age or older. The median age was 42 years. For every 100 females, there were 83.0 males. For every 100 females age 18 and over, there were 74.3 males.

The median income for a household in the town was $32,668, and the median income for a family was $35,750. Males had a median income of $26,154 versus $25,438 for females. The per capita income for the town was $16,322. About 18.6% of families and 22.5% of the population were below the poverty line, including 30.5% of those under age 18 and 16.1% of those age 65 or over.

== Notable people ==
- Kentwan Balmer, NFL defensive end
- King V. Cheek, lifelong educator
- Cedric Jones, former NFL wide receiver for the New England Patriots
- John Walcott Kay, physician and hospital founder
- Jackie Mason, comedian
- Gentry O. Smith, American foreign service officer
- Jimmy Soul, vocalist
- Benjamin S. Turner, businessman and politician
- Garland H. White, preacher and politician

== Education ==
The local education agency in Weldon is Weldon City Schools. In addition to an elementary school, middle school and Weldon High School, the city is home to Roanoke Valley Early college.

== See also ==
- Wilmington and Weldon Railroad
