= Boykins, Virginia =

- Town
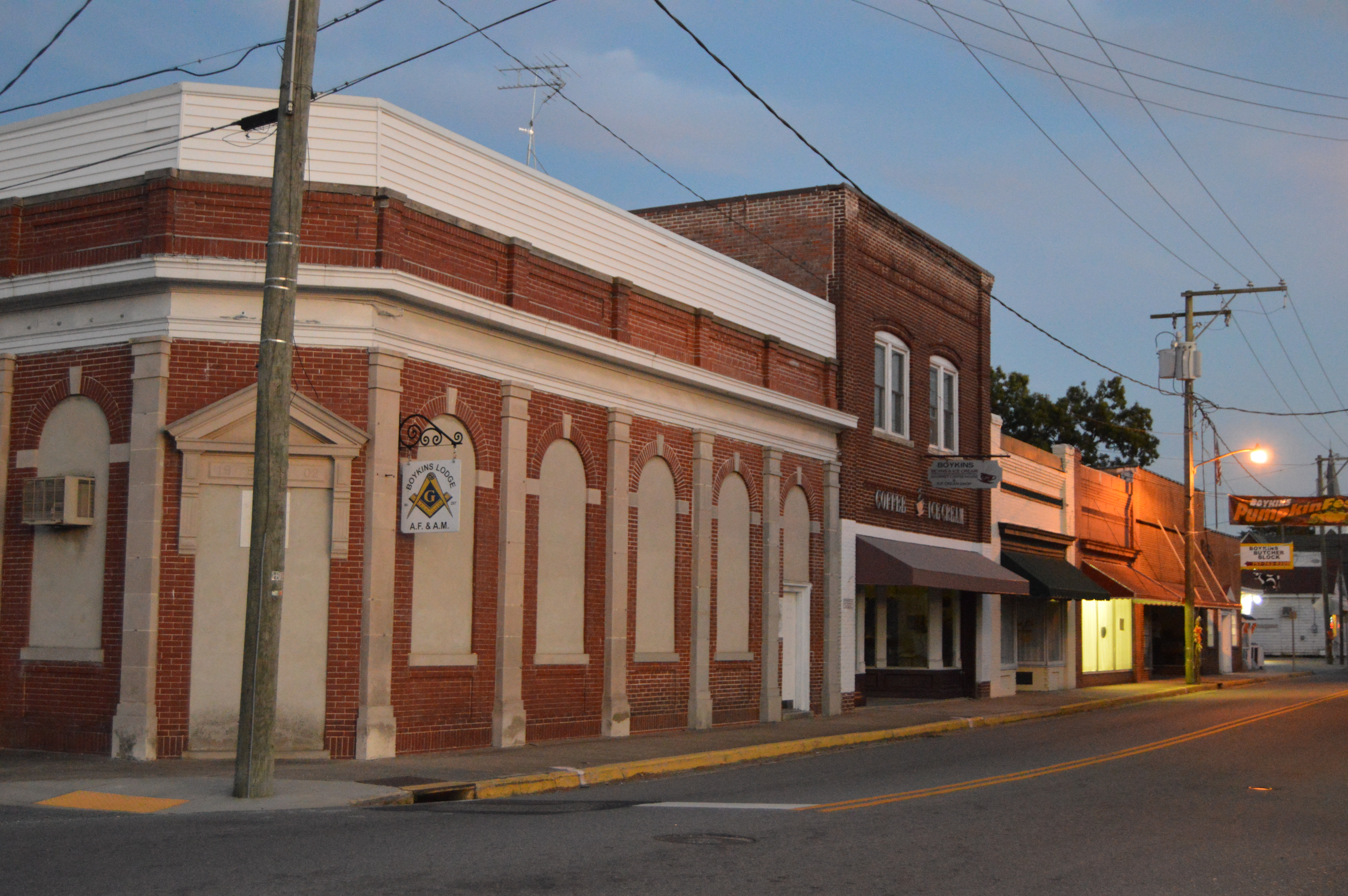
- Main Street
- Motto: "A Small Town with a Big Heart"
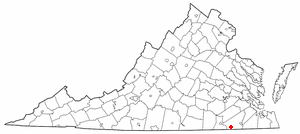
- Location of Boykins, Virginia
- Coordinates: 36°34′50″N 77°12′0″W
- Country: United States
- State: Virginia
- County: Southampton

Government

Area
  - Total: 0.69 sq mi (1.80 km^{2})
  - Land: 0.69 sq mi (1.80 km^{2})
  - Water: 0 sq mi (0.00 km^{2})
- Elevation: 39 ft (12 m)

Population (2020)
  - Total: 516
  - Density: 744/sq mi (287.1/km^{2})
- Time zone: UTC−5 (Eastern (EST))
  - Summer (DST): UTC−4 (EDT)
- ZIP code: 23827
- Area codes: 757, 948
- FIPS code: 51-09032
- GNIS feature ID: 1492616
- Website: www.townofboykinsva.com

Boykins is a town in Southampton County, Virginia, United States. The population was 516 at the 2020 census, and in 2025 about 525.

== History ==
John Boykin acquired a tract to the south of what became the town on the road to Severn, North Carolina, which lay partly in Virginia and partly in North Carolina. In 1829 Boykin and his wife sold the land and moved to Alabama. In 1835, Edward Beaton, one of three brothers who were living in Isle of Wight County near the Blackwater River, came to Southampton County and acquired the tract of land that is now known as Boykins from Francis Rochelle. Beaton, who was a continuous resident of Boykins until his death in 1880, is given credit for the founding of the town.

The Beaton-Powell House was listed on the National Register of Historic Places in 2008. Completed in 1857, this two-story plantation house has a living area that exceeds four thousand square feet and has an additional five hundred square feet of porch space. This residence has classic Greek Revival characteristics: the front portico with its pediment-like roof line supported by four columns; its bilateral symmetry; the corner pilasters that shoulder a wide entablature; the two- and four-panel doors; the two-over-two double hung sash windows and the five-inch exposure clapboard. The large roof overhang supported by massive brackets illustrates the Italianate influence. The milled timber framing is supported by a continuous brick foundation. All eight fireplace surrounds, exposed heart pine floors and most of its plaster walls, ceilings, crown molding and medallions are a few of the interior features that remain undisturbed. The original kitchen, which predates the house, was demolished with some of the wood used to remodel a neighboring property. A noncontributing building on the property was constructed to complement the house.

The Beaton-Powell House has an abundance of Italianate embellishments but is primarily of the Greek Revival Style, alternately, in its antebellum heyday, called the National or Democratic and even the American Greek Revival Style.1 This two-story plantation house was built in 1857 on a 600-acre tract of land, known as Boykins Depot by the town's founder, Edward Beaton.2 The house is now located on a half-acre landscaped lot at the northwest corner of Main Street and Virginia Avenue in the Town of Boykins, Southampton County, Virginia.3 Three conspicuous diagonal braces link together four paired, seven-inch square chamfered columns that support the massive, elaborate two tiered central portico which is capped with a gable roof.

== Geography ==
According to the United States Census Bureau, Boykins has a total area of 0.7 square mile (1.8 km^{2}), all land.

Boykins is at the junction of routes 35 and 186 near the North Carolina state line.

== Demographics ==
Historical population
Census	Pop.	Note	%±
1890	173		—
1900	224		29.5%
1910	505		125.4%
1920	637		26.1%
1930	636		−0.2%
1940	699		9.9%
1950	811		16.0%
1960	710		−12.5%
1970	742		4.5%
1980	791		6.6%
1990	658		−16.8%
2000	620		−5.8%
2010	564		−9.0%
2020	516		−8.5%
U.S. Decennial Census

At the 2000 census there were 620 people in 255 households, including 180 families, in the town. The population density was 905.6 people per square mile (352.0/km^{2}). There were 287 housing units at an average density of 419.2 per square mile (163.0/km^{2}). The racial makeup of the town was 61.61% White, 37.42% African American, 0.32% from other races, and 0.65% from two or more races. Hispanic or Latino of any race were 1.13%.

Of the 255 households 23.5% had children under the age of 18 living with them, 54.9% were married couples living together, 12.9% had a female householder with no husband present, and 29.4% were non-families. 27.8% of households were one person and 18.0% were one person aged 65 or older. The average household size was 2.43 and the average family size was 2.96.

The age distribution was 22.4% under the age of 18, 5.6% from 18 to 24, 24.4% from 25 to 44, 25.3% from 45 to 64, and 22.3% 65 or older. The median age was 43 years. For every 100 females, there were 89.0 males. For every 100 females age 18 and over, there were 78.1 males.

The median household income was $31,406 and the median family income was $40,000. Males had a median income of $29,821 versus $20,625 for females. The per capita income for the town was $16,148. About 8.4% of families and 15.2% of the population were below the poverty line, including 21.3% of those under age 18 and 10.1% of those age 65 or over.

== Climate ==
The climate in this area is characterized by hot, humid summers and generally mild to cool winters. According to the Köppen Climate Classification system, Boykins has a humid subtropical climate, abbreviated "Cfa" on climate maps.
