= Rocky Mount-Wilson-Roanoke Rapids combined statistical area =

Rocky Mount-Wilson-Roanoke Rapids Combined Statistical Area
- CSA
- Rocky Mount Metropolitan Statistical Area Wilson Micropolitan Statistical Area Roanoke Rapids Micropolitan Statistical Area
- Country: United States
- State: North Carolina
- Principal cities: Rocky Mount; Wilson; Roanoke Rapids; Tarboro

Area
  - Total: 2,674 sq mi (6,930 km^{2})

Population (2017 Census estimate)
  - Density: 112/sq mi (43/km^{2})
  - CSA: 299,581
- Time zone: EST
  - Summer (DST): EDT
- Area code: 252

The Rocky Mount-Wilson-Roanoke Rapids Combined Statistical Area, as defined by the United States Census Bureau, is an area consisting of five counties in northeastern North Carolina. As of the 2010 census, the CSA had a population of 310,416, with an estimated population of 297,726 in 2018. The statistical area includes the Rocky Mount Metropolitan Statistical Area, Wilson Micropolitan Statistical Area, and Roanoke Rapids Micropolitan Statistical Area, and the counties of Nash, Wilson, Edgecombe, Halifax, Northampton.

== Attractions ==
- Halifax Historic District - historic site operated by the North Carolina Department of Cultural Resources in Halifax, North Carolina. Every year, Halifax Day is held to celebrate the signing of the Halifax Resolves on April 12, 1776 (commemorated on the North Carolina state flag) with interpreters in period costumes providing guided tours of historic buildings, demonstrating historic crafts, teaching about colonial activities, and occasionally portraying revolutionary-era soldiers with historic weapons.
- Imperial Centre for the Arts and Sciences - art center, science museum, and theatre in Rocky Mount, North Carolina.

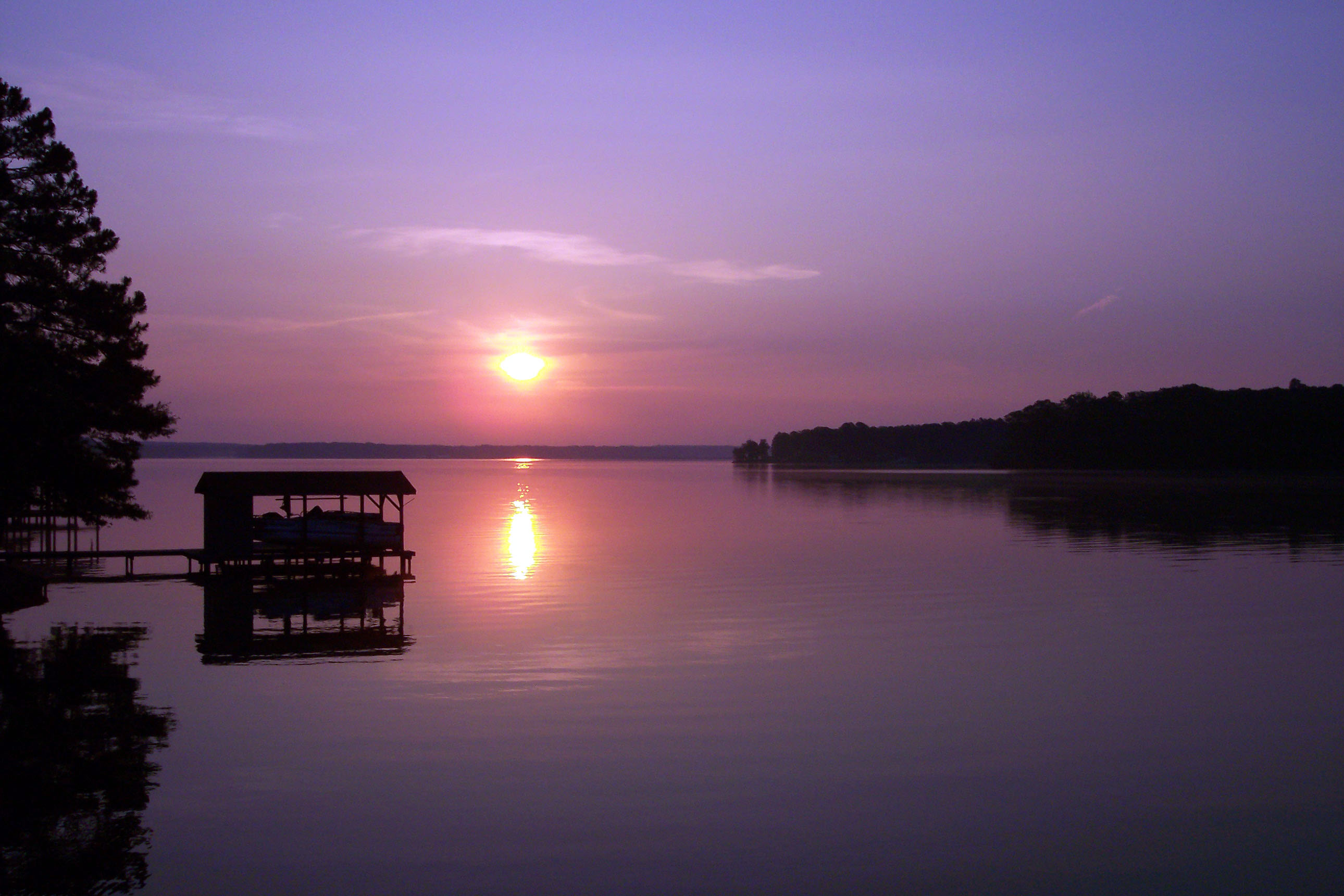
Sunrise over Lake Gaston.

- Lake Gaston - hydroelectric reservoir and recreational lake in Halifax and Northampton counties near Littleton and Roanoke Rapids.

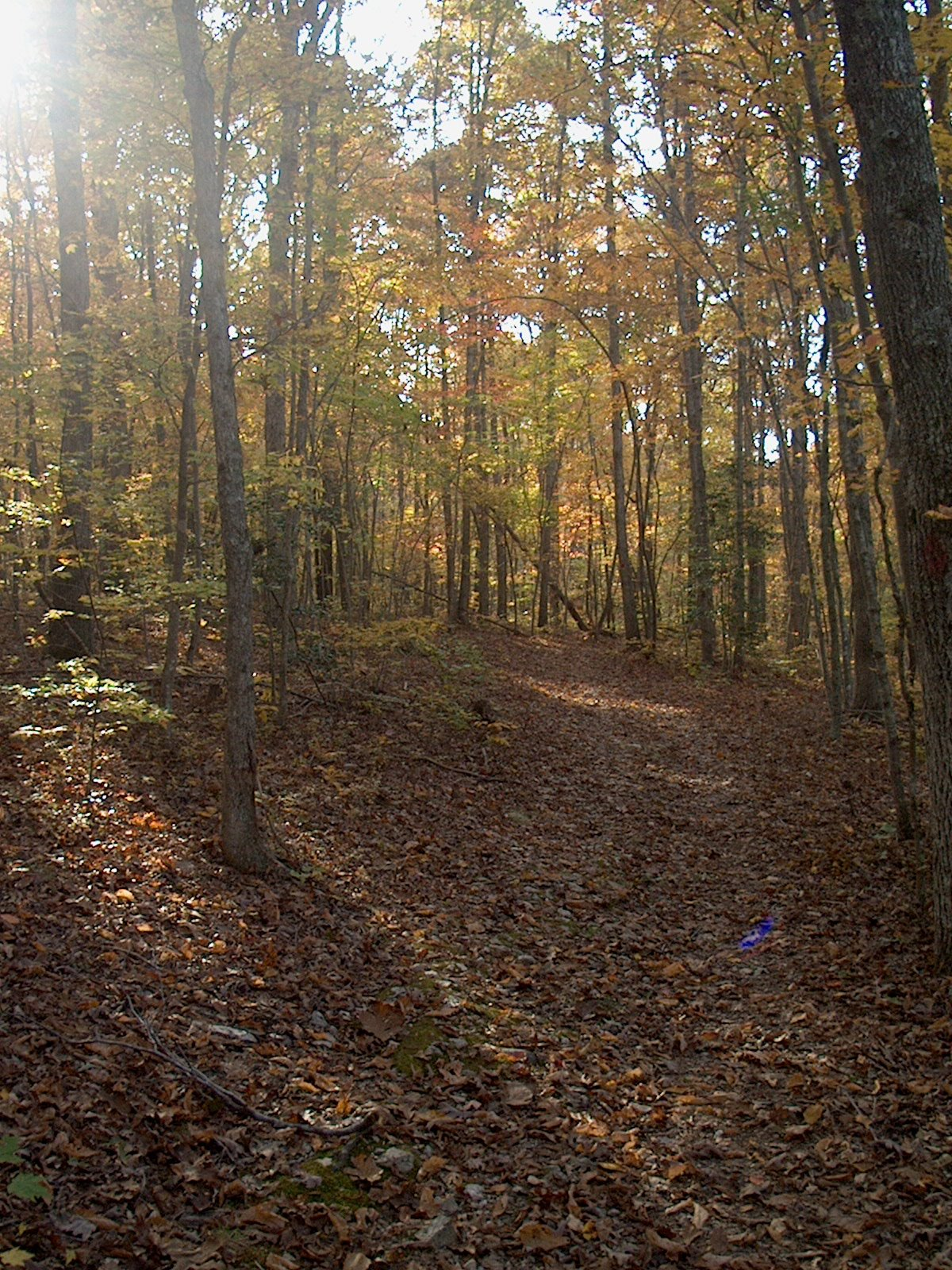
Medoc Mountain State Park in autumn.

- Medoc Mountain State Park - North Carolina state park in Halifax County, North Carolina.
- Rocky Mount Mills - historic cotton mill on the Tar River in Rocky Mount, North Carolina. Purchased by Capitol Broadcasting Company, it has been turned into a mixed-use campus of breweries, restaurants, lofts, and event space.
- Rocky Mount Event Center - an athletic and entertainment facility in Rocky Mount, North Carolina.

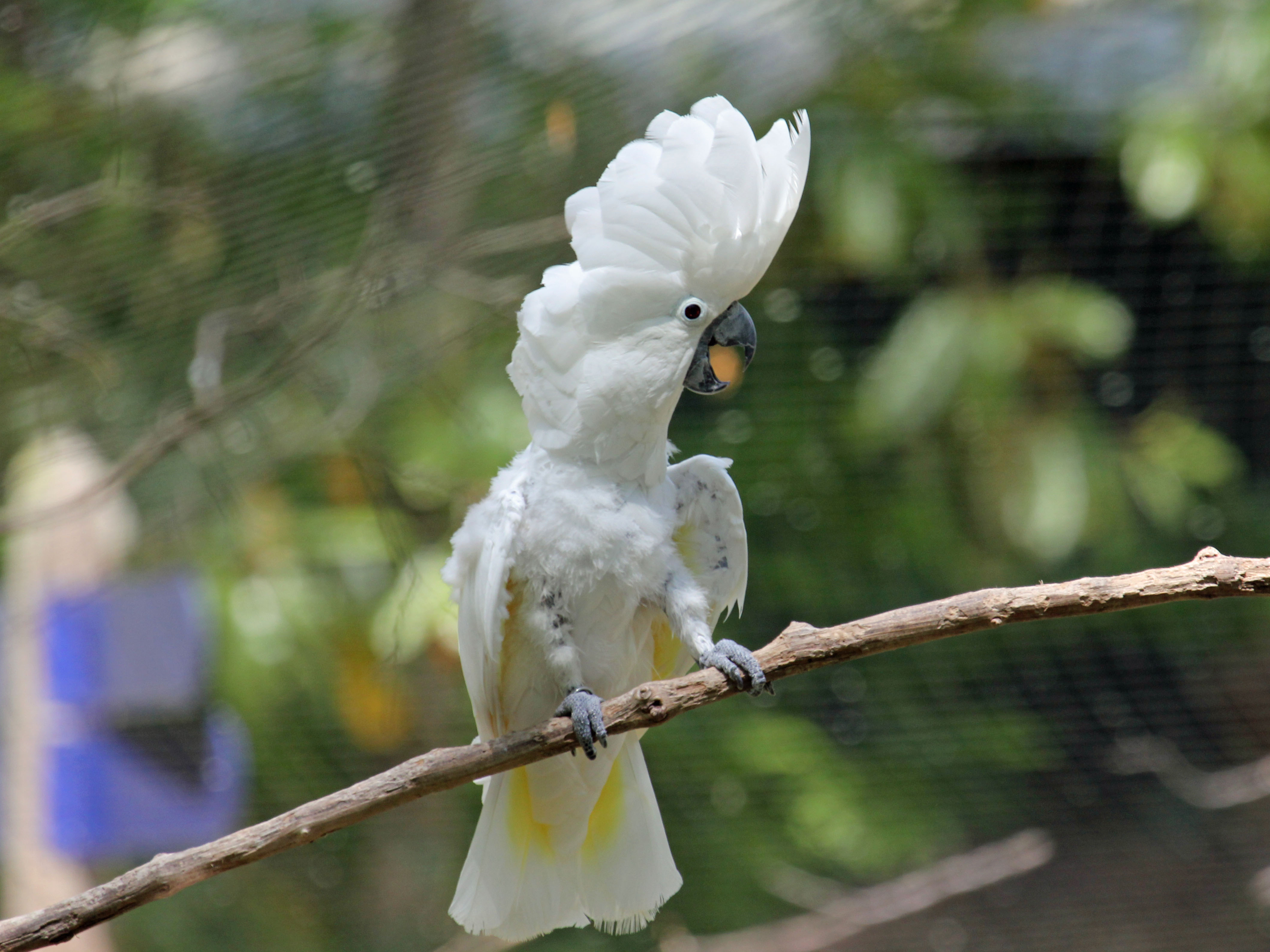
White cockatoo bird at Sylvan Heights Bird Park.

- Sylvan Heights Bird Park - bird park and breeding center in Scotland Neck, North Carolina with one of the world's large collections of waterfowl and other rare and exotic birds.
- Tarboro Historic District - 45-block historic district in Tarboro, North Carolina centered around the Tarboro Town Common, a 15-acre (61,000 m^{2}) park established in 1760, that has a canopy of tall oaks and installation of various war memorials. It is the oldest still-existing colonial town common in the country outside of Boston.

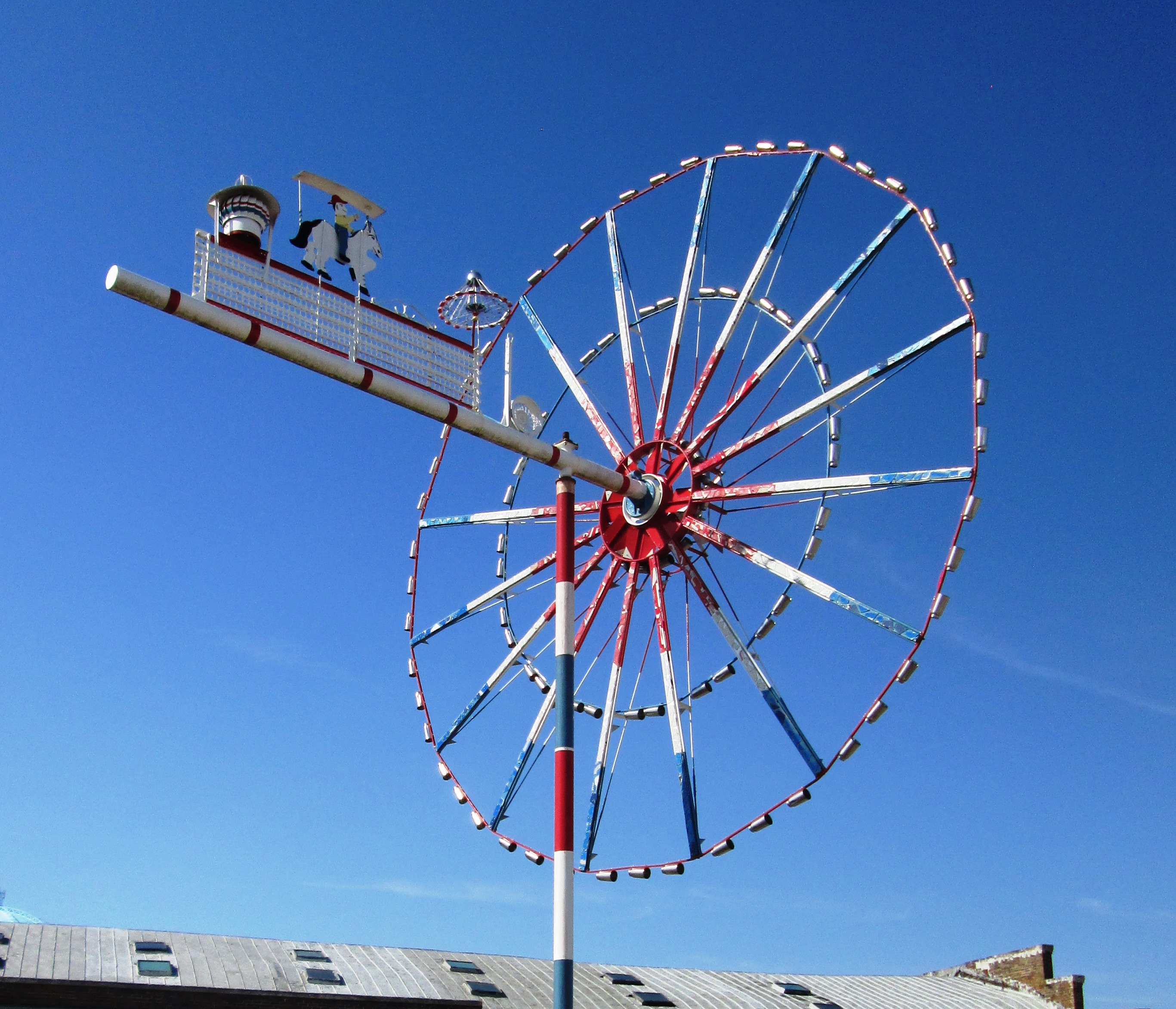
Vollis Simpson Whirligig Park sculpture.

- Vollis Simpson Whirligig Park - park in downtown Wilson, North Carolina with kinetic sculptures known as whirligigs by the late Vollis Simpson.

== Communities ==
=== Places with more than 50,000 inhabitants ===
- Rocky Mount (Anchor city)
- Wilson (Anchor city)

=== Places with 5,000 to 15,000 inhabitants ===
- Tarboro
- Roanoke Rapids (Anchor city)

=== Places with 1,000 to 5,000 inhabitants ===
- Sharpsburg
- Kenly
- Elm City
- Nashville
- Red Oak
- Spring Hope
- Pinetops
- Enfield
- Scotland Neck
- Weldon
- South Weldon
- South Rosemary
- Garysburg

=== Places with 500 to 1,000 inhabitants ===
- Dortches
- Middlesex
- Lucama
- Princeville
- Whitakers
- Stantonsburg
- Black Creek
- Littleton
- Seaboard
- Conway
- Jackson
- Rich Square
- Gaston
- Woodland
- Bailey

=== Places with less than 500 inhabitants ===
- Macclesfield
- Leggett
- Speed
- Momeyer
- Conetoe
- Castalia
- Saratoga
- Sims
- Halifax
- Hobgood
- Lasker
- Severn

=== Unincorporated places ===
- Crisp
- Montclair
- Aurelian Springs
- Heathsville
- Brinkleyville
- Margarettsville
- Pleasant Hill

== Demographics ==
As of the census estimate of 2017, there were 299,581 people and 118,537 households residing within the CSA. The racial makeup of the CSA was 44.2% White, 46.8% African American, 0.9% Native American, 0.4% Asian, 0% Pacific Islander, 0.3% from other races, and 1.5% from two or more races. Hispanic or Latino of any race were 5.9% of the population.

The median income for a household in the CSA was $41,974. The per capita income for the CSA was $22,133.

== Higher education ==
- North Carolina Wesleyan College
- Barton College
- Shaw University satellite campus
- Nash Community College
- Edgecombe Community College
- Wilson Community College
- Halifax Community College

== Government ==
The municipalities and counties in the Rocky Mount-Wilson-Roanoke Rapids CSA belong to the Upper Coastal Plain Council of Governments as part of the North Carolina Councils of Governments.

== See also ==
- North Carolina census statistical areas
- List of cities, towns, and villages in North Carolina
- List of unincorporated communities in North Carolina
