= W. Lunsford Crew =

American politician

Member of the North Carolina Senate from the 4th district
- In office January 1, 1953 – January 1, 1965
- Preceded by: Julian Russell Allsbrook
- Succeeded by: Carl Vernon Venters

Personal details
- Born: William Lunsford Crew; October 29, 1917 Pleasant Hill, Northampton County, North Carolina
- Died: October 10, 2004 (aged 86) Kitty Hawk, North Carolina
- Party: Democratic

W. Lunsford Crew (October 29, 1917 – October 10, 2004) was an American politician who served in the North Carolina Senate from the 4th district from 1953 to 1965.

He died on October 10, 2004, in Kitty Hawk, North Carolina at age 86.
