= Stu Martin =

Stu Martin may refer to:

- Stu Martin (baseball) (1912–1997), Major League Baseball player
- Stu Martin (drummer) (1938–1980), American jazz drummer
