= North Carolina statistical areas =

Coordinates: 35.5557°N 79.3877°W

The U.S. State of North Carolina currently has 48 statistical areas that have been delineated by the Office of Management and Budget (OMB). On July 21, 2023, the OMB delineated nine combined statistical areas, 15 metropolitan statistical areas, and 24 micropolitan statistical areas in North Carolina. As of 2023, the largest of these is the Charlotte-Concord, NC-SC CSA, comprising the state's largest city of Charlotte and its suburbs.

== Statistical areas ==
The Office of Management and Budget (OMB) has designated more than 1,000 statistical areas for the United States and Puerto Rico. These statistical areas are important geographic delineations of population clusters used by the OMB, the United States Census Bureau, planning organizations, and federal, state, and local government entities.

The OMB defines a core-based statistical area (commonly referred to as a CBSA) as the county or counties (or county-equivalents) surrounding at least one densely-settled core of at least 10,000 population, "plus adjacent counties having a high degree of social and economic integration with the core as measured through commuting ties with the counties containing the core". The OMB further divides core-based statistical areas based on population into metropolitan statistical areas (MSAs) for those with at least 50,000 and micropolitan statistical areas (μSAs) for those with 10,000 to 49,999 people.

The OMB defines a combined statistical area (CSA) as two or more adjacent core-based statistical areas where the employment interchange rate (% commuting from A to B plus % commuting from B to A) is at least 15%. The primary statistical areas (PSAs) include all combined statistical areas and any core-based statistical area that is not a constituent of a combined statistical area.

The 48 United States statistical areas and 100 counties of the State of North Carolina (Note: An out-of-state area and its population are displayed in green. An area that extends into more than one state is displayed in purple. A purple population number over a black population number show the total population versus the in-state population. The state's abbreviation is also shown next to the in-state total.)
Combined statistical area	2025 population (est.)	Core-based statistical area	2025 population (est.)	County	2025 population (est.)
Charlotte-Concord, NC-SC CSA	3,533,073; 3,078,889 (NC)	Charlotte-Concord-Gastonia, NC-SC MSA	2,805,115; 2,484,646 (NC)	Mecklenburg County, North Carolina	1,233,383
Charlotte-Concord, NC-SC CSA	3,533,073; 3,078,889 (NC)	Charlotte-Concord-Gastonia, NC-SC MSA	2,805,115; 2,484,646 (NC)	York County, South Carolina	306,887
Charlotte-Concord, NC-SC CSA	3,533,073; 3,078,889 (NC)	Charlotte-Concord-Gastonia, NC-SC MSA	2,805,115; 2,484,646 (NC)	Union County, North Carolina	267,674
Charlotte-Concord, NC-SC CSA	3,533,073; 3,078,889 (NC)	Charlotte-Concord-Gastonia, NC-SC MSA	2,805,115; 2,484,646 (NC)	Cabarrus County, North Carolina	249,725
Charlotte-Concord, NC-SC CSA	3,533,073; 3,078,889 (NC)	Charlotte-Concord-Gastonia, NC-SC MSA	2,805,115; 2,484,646 (NC)	Gaston County, North Carolina	246,558
Charlotte-Concord, NC-SC CSA	3,533,073; 3,078,889 (NC)	Charlotte-Concord-Gastonia, NC-SC MSA	2,805,115; 2,484,646 (NC)	Iredell County, North Carolina	211,798
Charlotte-Concord, NC-SC CSA	3,533,073; 3,078,889 (NC)	Charlotte-Concord-Gastonia, NC-SC MSA	2,805,115; 2,484,646 (NC)	Rowan County, North Carolina	155,096
Charlotte-Concord, NC-SC CSA	3,533,073; 3,078,889 (NC)	Charlotte-Concord-Gastonia, NC-SC MSA	2,805,115; 2,484,646 (NC)	Lancaster County, South Carolina	114,296
Charlotte-Concord, NC-SC CSA	3,533,073; 3,078,889 (NC)	Charlotte-Concord-Gastonia, NC-SC MSA	2,805,115; 2,484,646 (NC)	Lincoln County, North Carolina	98,654
Charlotte-Concord, NC-SC CSA	3,533,073; 3,078,889 (NC)	Charlotte-Concord-Gastonia, NC-SC MSA	2,805,115; 2,484,646 (NC)	Chester County, South Carolina	33,001
Charlotte-Concord, NC-SC CSA	3,533,073; 3,078,889 (NC)	Charlotte-Concord-Gastonia, NC-SC MSA	2,805,115; 2,484,646 (NC)	Anson County, North Carolina	21,758
Charlotte-Concord, NC-SC CSA	3,533,073; 3,078,889 (NC)	Hickory-Lenoir-Morganton, NC MSA	376,890	Catawba County, North Carolina	170,172
Charlotte-Concord, NC-SC CSA	3,533,073; 3,078,889 (NC)	Hickory-Lenoir-Morganton, NC MSA	376,890	Burke County, North Carolina	88,655
Charlotte-Concord, NC-SC CSA	3,533,073; 3,078,889 (NC)	Hickory-Lenoir-Morganton, NC MSA	376,890	Caldwell County, North Carolina	81,105
Charlotte-Concord, NC-SC CSA	3,533,073; 3,078,889 (NC)	Hickory-Lenoir-Morganton, NC MSA	376,890	Alexander County, North Carolina	36,958
Charlotte-Concord, NC-SC CSA	3,533,073; 3,078,889 (NC)	Shelby-Kings Mountain, NC μSA	103,325	Cleveland County, North Carolina	103,325
Charlotte-Concord, NC-SC CSA	3,533,073; 3,078,889 (NC)	Albemarle, NC μSA	68,830	Stanly County, North Carolina	68,830
Charlotte-Concord, NC-SC CSA	3,533,073; 3,078,889 (NC)	Marion, NC μSA	45,198	McDowell County, North Carolina	45,198
Raleigh-Durham-Cary, NC CSA	2,484,238	Raleigh-Cary, NC MSA	1,595,720	Wake County, North Carolina	1,257,235
Raleigh-Durham-Cary, NC CSA	2,484,238	Raleigh-Cary, NC MSA	1,595,720	Johnston County, North Carolina	256,448
Raleigh-Durham-Cary, NC CSA	2,484,238	Raleigh-Cary, NC MSA	1,595,720	Franklin County, North Carolina	82,037
Raleigh-Durham-Cary, NC CSA	2,484,238	Durham-Chapel Hill, NC MSA	625,485	Durham County, North Carolina	347,240
Raleigh-Durham-Cary, NC CSA	2,484,238	Durham-Chapel Hill, NC MSA	625,485	Orange County, North Carolina	152,498
Raleigh-Durham-Cary, NC CSA	2,484,238	Durham-Chapel Hill, NC MSA	625,485	Chatham County, North Carolina	85,111
Raleigh-Durham-Cary, NC CSA	2,484,238	Durham-Chapel Hill, NC MSA	625,485	Person County, North Carolina	40,636
Raleigh-Durham-Cary, NC CSA	2,484,238	Anderson Creek, NC μSA	150,137	Harnett County, North Carolina	150,137
Raleigh-Durham-Cary, NC CSA	2,484,238	Sanford, NC μSA	70,258	Lee County, North Carolina	70,258
Raleigh-Durham-Cary, NC CSA	2,484,238	Henderson, NC μSA	42,638	Vance County, North Carolina	42,638
Greensboro–-Winston-Salem–-High Point, NC CSA	1,776,615	Greensboro-High Point, NC MSA	805,945	Guilford County, North Carolina	562,234
Greensboro–-Winston-Salem–-High Point, NC CSA	1,776,615	Greensboro-High Point, NC MSA	805,945	Randolph County, North Carolina	149,516
Greensboro–-Winston-Salem–-High Point, NC CSA	1,776,615	Greensboro-High Point, NC MSA	805,945	Rockingham County, North Carolina	94,195
Greensboro–-Winston-Salem–-High Point, NC CSA	1,776,615	Winston-Salem, NC MSA	712,206	Forsyth County, North Carolina	401,718
Greensboro–-Winston-Salem–-High Point, NC CSA	1,776,615	Winston-Salem, NC MSA	712,206	Davidson County, North Carolina	180,182
Greensboro–-Winston-Salem–-High Point, NC CSA	1,776,615	Winston-Salem, NC MSA	712,206	Stokes County, North Carolina	46,126
Greensboro–-Winston-Salem–-High Point, NC CSA	1,776,615	Winston-Salem, NC MSA	712,206	Davie County, North Carolina	45,855
Greensboro–-Winston-Salem–-High Point, NC CSA	1,776,615	Winston-Salem, NC MSA	712,206	Yadkin County, North Carolina	38,325
Greensboro–-Winston-Salem–-High Point, NC CSA	1,776,615	Burlington, NC MSA	186,177	Alamance County, North Carolina	186,177
Greensboro–-Winston-Salem–-High Point, NC CSA	1,776,615	Mount Airy, NC μSA	72,287	Surry County, North Carolina	72,287
Fayetteville-Lumberton-Pinehurst, NC CSA	701,335	Fayetteville, NC MSA	395,412	Cumberland County, North Carolina	338,473
Fayetteville-Lumberton-Pinehurst, NC CSA	701,335	Fayetteville, NC MSA	395,412	Hoke County, North Carolina	56,939
Fayetteville-Lumberton-Pinehurst, NC CSA	701,335	Lumberton, NC μSA	119,941	Robeson County, North Carolina	119,941
Fayetteville-Lumberton-Pinehurst, NC CSA	701,335	Pinehurst-Southern Pines, NC μSA	110,619	Moore County, North Carolina	110,619
Fayetteville-Lumberton-Pinehurst, NC CSA	701,335	Rockingham, NC μSA	42,041	Richmond County, North Carolina	42,041
Fayetteville-Lumberton-Pinehurst, NC CSA	701,335	Laurinburg, NC μSA	33,322	Scotland County, North Carolina	33,322
Asheville-Waynesville-Brevard, NC CSA	519,925	Asheville, NC MSA	422,345	Buncombe County, North Carolina	277,417
Asheville-Waynesville-Brevard, NC CSA	519,925	Asheville, NC MSA	422,345	Henderson County, North Carolina	122,375
Asheville-Waynesville-Brevard, NC CSA	519,925	Asheville, NC MSA	422,345	Madison County, North Carolina	22,553
Asheville-Waynesville-Brevard, NC CSA	519,925	Waynesville, NC μSA	63,369	Haywood County, North Carolina	63,369
Asheville-Waynesville-Brevard, NC CSA	519,925	Brevard, NC μSA	34,211	Transylvania County, North Carolina	34,211
none		Wilmington, NC MSA	492,772	New Hanover County, North Carolina	245,959
none		Wilmington, NC MSA	492,772	Brunswick County, North Carolina	174,702
none		Wilmington, NC MSA	492,772	Pender County, North Carolina	72,111
Rocky Mount-Wilson-Roanoke Rapids CSA	292,661	Rocky Mount, NC MSA	148,486	Nash County, North Carolina	99,365
Rocky Mount-Wilson-Roanoke Rapids CSA	292,661	Rocky Mount, NC MSA	148,486	Edgecombe County, North Carolina	49,121
Rocky Mount-Wilson-Roanoke Rapids CSA	292,661	Wilson, NC μSA	81,150	Wilson County, North Carolina	81,150
Rocky Mount-Wilson-Roanoke Rapids CSA	292,661	Roanoke Rapids, NC μSA	63,025	Halifax County, North Carolina	46,534
Rocky Mount-Wilson-Roanoke Rapids CSA	292,661	Roanoke Rapids, NC μSA	63,025	Northampton County, North Carolina	16,491
Greenville-Washington, NC CSA	227,606	Greenville, NC MSA	182,936	Pitt County, North Carolina	182,936
Greenville-Washington, NC CSA	227,606	Washington, NC μSA	44,670	Beaufort County, North Carolina	44,670
none		Jacksonville, NC MSA	217,175	Onslow County, North Carolina	217,175
New Bern-Morehead City, NC CSA	197,827	New Bern, NC μSA	127,358	Craven County, North Carolina	105,025
New Bern-Morehead City, NC CSA	197,827	New Bern, NC μSA	127,358	Pamlico County, North Carolina	12,758
New Bern-Morehead City, NC CSA	197,827	New Bern, NC μSA	127,358	Jones County, North Carolina	9,575
New Bern-Morehead City, NC CSA	197,827	Morehead City, NC μSA	70,469	Carteret County, North Carolina	70,469
Virginia Beach-Chesapeake, VA-NC CSA	1,877,659; 135,153 (NC)	Virginia Beach-Chesapeake-Norfolk, VA-NC MSA	1,797,213; 53,073 (NC)	City of Virginia Beach, Virginia	453,737
Virginia Beach-Chesapeake, VA-NC CSA	1,877,659; 135,153 (NC)	Virginia Beach-Chesapeake-Norfolk, VA-NC MSA	1,797,213; 53,073 (NC)	City of Chesapeake, Virginia	255,332
Virginia Beach-Chesapeake, VA-NC CSA	1,877,659; 135,153 (NC)	Virginia Beach-Chesapeake-Norfolk, VA-NC MSA	1,797,213; 53,073 (NC)	City of Norfolk, Virginia	231,013
Virginia Beach-Chesapeake, VA-NC CSA	1,877,659; 135,153 (NC)	Virginia Beach-Chesapeake-Norfolk, VA-NC MSA	1,797,213; 53,073 (NC)	City of Newport News, Virginia	183,230
Virginia Beach-Chesapeake, VA-NC CSA	1,877,659; 135,153 (NC)	Virginia Beach-Chesapeake-Norfolk, VA-NC MSA	1,797,213; 53,073 (NC)	City of Hampton, Virginia	137,315
Virginia Beach-Chesapeake, VA-NC CSA	1,877,659; 135,153 (NC)	Virginia Beach-Chesapeake-Norfolk, VA-NC MSA	1,797,213; 53,073 (NC)	City of Suffolk, Virginia	104,699
Virginia Beach-Chesapeake, VA-NC CSA	1,877,659; 135,153 (NC)	Virginia Beach-Chesapeake-Norfolk, VA-NC MSA	1,797,213; 53,073 (NC)	City of Portsmouth, Virginia	96,777
Virginia Beach-Chesapeake, VA-NC CSA	1,877,659; 135,153 (NC)	Virginia Beach-Chesapeake-Norfolk, VA-NC MSA	1,797,213; 53,073 (NC)	James City County, Virginia	83,326
Virginia Beach-Chesapeake, VA-NC CSA	1,877,659; 135,153 (NC)	Virginia Beach-Chesapeake-Norfolk, VA-NC MSA	1,797,213; 53,073 (NC)	York County, Virginia	71,374
Virginia Beach-Chesapeake, VA-NC CSA	1,877,659; 135,153 (NC)	Virginia Beach-Chesapeake-Norfolk, VA-NC MSA	1,797,213; 53,073 (NC)	Isle of Wight County, Virginia	41,321
Virginia Beach-Chesapeake, VA-NC CSA	1,877,659; 135,153 (NC)	Virginia Beach-Chesapeake-Norfolk, VA-NC MSA	1,797,213; 53,073 (NC)	Gloucester County, Virginia	40,097
Virginia Beach-Chesapeake, VA-NC CSA	1,877,659; 135,153 (NC)	Virginia Beach-Chesapeake-Norfolk, VA-NC MSA	1,797,213; 53,073 (NC)	Currituck County, North Carolina	33,158
Virginia Beach-Chesapeake, VA-NC CSA	1,877,659; 135,153 (NC)	Virginia Beach-Chesapeake-Norfolk, VA-NC MSA	1,797,213; 53,073 (NC)	City of Williamsburg, Virginia	15,861
Virginia Beach-Chesapeake, VA-NC CSA	1,877,659; 135,153 (NC)	Virginia Beach-Chesapeake-Norfolk, VA-NC MSA	1,797,213; 53,073 (NC)	City of Poquoson, Virginia	13,292
Virginia Beach-Chesapeake, VA-NC CSA	1,877,659; 135,153 (NC)	Virginia Beach-Chesapeake-Norfolk, VA-NC MSA	1,797,213; 53,073 (NC)	Camden County, North Carolina	11,315
Virginia Beach-Chesapeake, VA-NC CSA	1,877,659; 135,153 (NC)	Virginia Beach-Chesapeake-Norfolk, VA-NC MSA	1,797,213; 53,073 (NC)	Gates County, North Carolina	10,234
Virginia Beach-Chesapeake, VA-NC CSA	1,877,659; 135,153 (NC)	Virginia Beach-Chesapeake-Norfolk, VA-NC MSA	1,797,213; 53,073 (NC)	Mathews County, Virginia	8,529
Virginia Beach-Chesapeake, VA-NC CSA	1,877,659; 135,153 (NC)	Virginia Beach-Chesapeake-Norfolk, VA-NC MSA	1,797,213; 53,073 (NC)	Surry County, Virginia	6,603
Virginia Beach-Chesapeake, VA-NC CSA	1,877,659; 135,153 (NC)	Elizabeth City, NC μSA	42,201	Pasquotank County, North Carolina	42,201
Virginia Beach-Chesapeake, VA-NC CSA	1,877,659; 135,153 (NC)	Kill Devil Hills, NC μSA	38,245	Dare County, North Carolina	38,245
none		Goldsboro, NC MSA	122,278	Wayne County, North Carolina	122,278
none		North Wilkesboro, NC μSA	66,233	Wilkes County, North Carolina	66,233
none		Forest City, NC μSA	65,745	Rutherford County, North Carolina	65,745
none		Kinston, NC μSA	55,837	Lenoir County, North Carolina	55,837
none		Boone, NC μSA	54,786	Watauga County, North Carolina	54,786
none		none		Granville County, North Carolina	61,421
none		none		Sampson County, North Carolina	61,504
none		none		Columbus County, North Carolina	50,487
none		none		Duplin County, North Carolina	51,571
none		none		Jackson County, North Carolina	45,039
none		none		Macon County, North Carolina	39,232
none		none		Cherokee County, North Carolina	30,830
none		none		Bladen County, North Carolina	30,007
none		none		Ashe County, North Carolina	27,514
none		none		Montgomery County, North Carolina	26,403
none		none		Caswell County, North Carolina	22,563
none		none		Martin County, North Carolina	21,601
none		none		Greene County, North Carolina	20,700
none		none		Polk County, North Carolina	20,533
none		none		Hertford County, North Carolina	19,015
none		none		Yancey County, North Carolina	19,084
none		none		Warren County, North Carolina	18,898
none		none		Avery County, North Carolina	18,110
none		none		Bertie County, North Carolina	17,086
none		none		Mitchell County, North Carolina	15,062
none		none		Swain County, North Carolina	14,024
none		none		Chowan County, North Carolina	14,082
none		none		Perquimans County, North Carolina	13,490
none		none		Clay County, North Carolina	12,239
none		none		Alleghany County, North Carolina	11,479
none		none		Washington County, North Carolina	10,638
none		none		Graham County, North Carolina	8,190
none		none		Hyde County, North Carolina	4,554
none		none		Tyrrell County, North Carolina	3,537
State of North Carolina					11,197,968

The 39 core-based statistical areas of the State of North Carolina (Note: For CBSAs comprising populations from multiple states, they are listed twice to show both their intrastate population within that CBSA as well as the CBSA's total population. Only the intrastate population is ranked.)
2025 rank	Core-based statistical area	Population				
2025 rank	Core-based statistical area	2025 estimate	Change	2020 Census	Change	2010 Census
1	Charlotte-Concord-Gastonia, NC-SC MSA (NC)	2,484,646	+10.43%	2,249,929	+17.91%	1,908,095
2	Raleigh-Cary, NC MSA	1,595,720	+12.85%	1,413,982	+25.08%	1,130,490
3	Greensboro-High Point, NC MSA	805,945	+3.78%	776,566	+7.29%	723,801
4	Winston-Salem, NC MSA	712,206	+5.36%	675,966	+5.52%	640,595
5	Durham-Chapel Hill, NC MSA	625,485	+6.21%	588,911	+16.76%	504,357
6	Wilmington, NC MSA	492,772	+16.61%	422,598	+16.64%	362,315
7	Asheville, NC MSA	422,345	+3.79%	406,926	+11.24%	365,822
8	Fayetteville, NC MSA	395,412	+2.22%	386,810	+5.58%	366,383
9	Hickory-Lenoir-Morganton, NC MSA	376,890	+3.18%	365,276	−0.06%	365,497
10	Jacksonville, NC MSA	217,175	+6.16%	204,576	+15.08%	177,772
11	Burlington, NC MSA	186,177	+8.61%	171,415	+13.42%	151,131
12	Greenville, NC MSA	182,936	+7.46%	170,243	+1.25%	168,148
13	Rocky Mount, NC MSA	148,486	+3.21%	143,870	−5.59%	152,392
14	Anderson Creek, NC μSA	150,137	+12.40%	133,568	+16.47%	114,678
15	New Bern, NC μSA	127,358	+4.25%	122,168	−3.65%	126,802
16	Goldsboro, NC MSA	122,278	+4.21%	117,333	−4.31%	122,623
17	Lumberton, NC μSA	119,941	+2.93%	116,530	−13.15%	134,168
18	Pinehurst-Southern Pines, NC μSA	110,619	+10.92%	99,727	+13.01%	88,247
19	Shelby-Kings Mountain, NC μSA	103,325	+3.82%	99,519	+1.47%	98,078
20	Wilson, NC μSA	81,150	+3.00%	78,784	−3.02%	81,234
21	Mount Airy, NC μSA	72,287	+1.30%	71,359	−3.14%	73,673
22	Morehead City, NC μSA	70,469	+4.11%	67,686	+1.83%	66,469
23	Sanford, NC μSA	70,258	+11.02%	63,285	+9.36%	57,866
24	North Wilkesboro, NC μSA	66,233	+0.40%	65,969	−4.86%	69,340
25	Albemarle, NC μSA	68,830	+10.12%	62,504	+3.17%	60,585
26	Forest City, NC μSA	65,745	+2.02%	64,444	−4.96%	67,810
27	Roanoke Rapids, NC μSA	63,025	−4.64%	66,093	−13.93%	76,790
28	Waynesville, NC μSA	63,369	+2.06%	62,089	+5.17%	59,036
29	Kinston, NC μSA	55,837	+1.30%	55,122	−7.35%	59,495
30	Boone, NC μSA	54,786	+1.29%	54,086	+5.89%	51,079
31	Virginia Beach–Norfolk–Newport News, VA-NC MSA (NC)	54,707	+11.80%	48,933	+7.02%	45,724
32	Marion, NC μSA	45,198	+1.39%	44,578	−0.93%	44,996
33	Washington, NC μSA	44,670	+0.04%	44,652	−6.51%	47,759
34	Rockingham, NC μSA	42,041	−2.11%	42,946	−7.92%	46,639
35	Henderson, NC μSA	42,638	+0.14%	42,578	−6.26%	45,422
36	Elizabeth City, NC μSA	42,201	+4.03%	40,568	−0.23%	40,661
37	Kill Devil Hills, NC μSA	38,245	+3.60%	36,915	+8.83%	33,920
38	Laurinburg, NC μSA	33,322	−2.49%	34,174	−5.48%	36,157
39	Brevard, NC μSA	34,211	+3.71%	32,986	−0.31%	33,090
	Charlotte-Concord-Gastonia, NC-SC MSA	2,938,830	+10.47%	2,660,329	+18.56%	2,243,960
	Virginia Beach–Norfolk–Newport News, VA-NC MSA	1,797,213	+0.96%	1,780,059	+5.09%	1,693,860

The nine combined statistical areas of the State of North Carolina (Note: For CSAs comprising populations from multiple states, they are listed twice to show both their intrastate population within that CSA as well as the CSA's total population. Only the intrastate population is ranked.)
2025 rank	Combined statistical area	Population				
2025 rank	Combined statistical area	2025 estimate	Change	2020 Census	Change	2010 Census
1	Charlotte-Concord, NC-SC CSA (NC)	3,078,889	+9.11%	2,821,806	+13.91%	2,477,251
2	Raleigh-Durham-Cary, NC CSA	2,484,238	+10.79%	2,242,324	+21.02%	1,852,813
3	Greensboro–-Winston-Salem–-High Point, NC CSA	1,776,615	+4.80%	1,695,306	+6.68%	1,589,200
4	Fayetteville-Lumberton-Pinehurst, NC CSA	701,335	+3.11%	680,187	+1.28%	671,594
5	Asheville-Waynesville-Brevard, NC CSA	519,925	+3.57%	502,001	+9.62%	457,948
6	Rocky Mount-Wilson-Roanoke Rapids, NC CSA	292,661	+1.36%	288,747	−6.98%	310,416
7	Greenville-Washington, NC CSA	227,606	+5.91%	214,895	−0.47%	215,907
8	New Bern-Morehead City, NC CSA	197,827	+4.20%	189,854	−1.77%	193,271
9	Virginia Beach-Chesapeake, VA-NC CSA (NC)	135,153	+6.91%	126,416	+5.08%	120,305
	Charlotte-Concord, NC-SC CSA	3,533,073	+9.31%	3,232,206	+14.90%	2,813,116
	Virginia Beach-Chesapeake, VA-NC CSA	1,877,659	+1.08%	1,857,542	+5.04%	1,768,441

== See also ==
- List of metropolitan areas of North Carolina
- Geography of North Carolina
  - Demographics of North Carolina
