= Stu Martin (baseball) =

American baseball player (1912–1997)

- Second baseman
- Born: November 19, 1912; Rich Square, North Carolina, U.S.
- Died: January 11, 1997 (aged 84); Severn, North Carolina, U.S.
- Batted: Left Threw: Right

MLB debut
- April 14, 1936, for the St. Louis Cardinals

Last MLB appearance
- September 6, 1943, for the Chicago Cubs

MLB statistics
- Batting average: .268
- Home runs: 16
- Runs batted in: 183
- Stats at Baseball Reference

Teams
- St. Louis Cardinals (1936–1940); Pittsburgh Pirates (1941–1942); Chicago Cubs (1943)

Career highlights and awards
- All-Star (1936)

Stuart McGuire Martin (November 19, 1912 – January 11, 1997) was an American second baseman in Major League Baseball. He played from 1936 to 1943.

== Biography ==
Martin was born in Rich Square, North Carolina and attended Guilford College. He began his professional baseball career in the St. Louis Cardinals organization in 1934. The following season, he hit .338 in the Piedmont League. He was brought up to the major league club in 1936.

Martin platooned with Frankie Frisch in his rookie season and hit .298, with career-highs in on-base percentage and slugging percentage. He was named to the National League All-Star team.

Martin continued to play semi-regularly for St. Louis for the rest of the decade. However, in 1940 his batting numbers declined, and he was sold to the Pittsburgh Pirates after the season. He played parts of two seasons there. In 1943, he was traded to the Chicago Cubs and played a few games for them. Then, he served in the United States Navy for three years.

In 722 games over eight major league seasons, Martin posted a .268 batting average (599-for-2237) with 322 runs, 16 home runs, 183 RBI and 190 bases on balls. Defensively, he recorded an overall .968 fielding percentage primarily as a second baseman.

Martin returned to professional baseball in 1946. He played in the Pacific Coast League for one season and finished his career with two seasons in the Coastal Plain League.

Martin died in Severn, North Carolina at the age of 84.
