= Garysburg United Methodist Church and Cemetery =

Historic site in Northampton County, North Carolina, US

- U.S. National Register of Historic Places
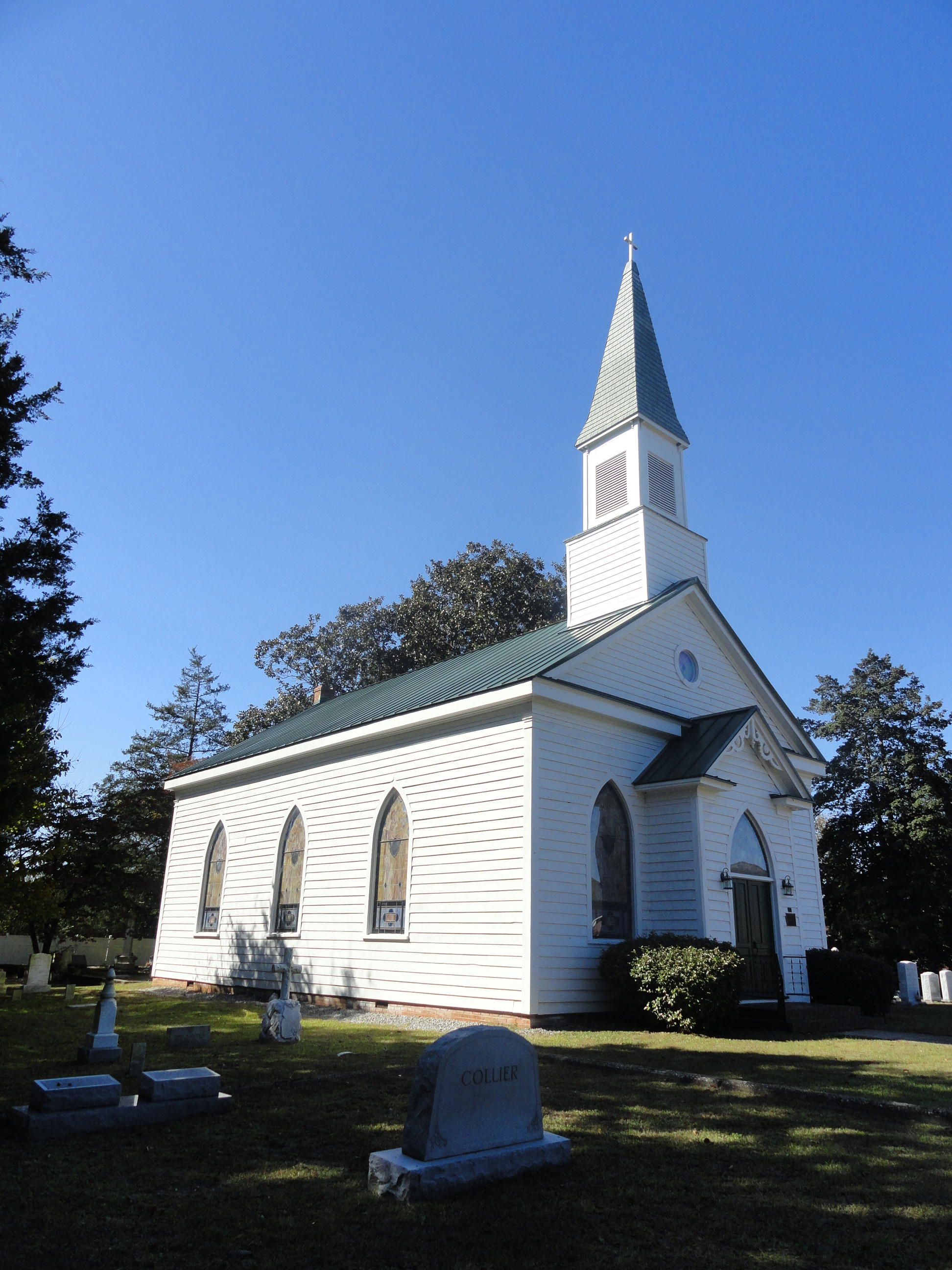

- Location within North Carolina Location within the United States
- Location: SR 1207; Garysburg, North Carolina
- Coordinates: 36°26′47″N 77°33′42″W
- Area: 1.5 acres (0.61 ha)
- Built: 1853
- Architectural style: Greek Revival
- NRHP reference No.: 85001350
- Added to NRHP: June 20, 1985

Garysburg United Methodist Church and Cemetery, also known as Chapel Grove Church, is a historic Methodist church and cemetery located on SR 1207 in Garysburg, Northampton County, North Carolina. It was built about 1853, and is a one-story, three-bay, temple-form Greek Revival style frame church. It features a projecting vestibule and a tall, graceful bell tower added in 1905. Adjacent to the church is the cemetery.

It was listed on the National Register of Historic Places in 1985.
