= North Wilkesboro Micropolitan Area =

- Micropolitan Statistical Area
- North Wilkesboro, NC Micropolitan Statistical Area
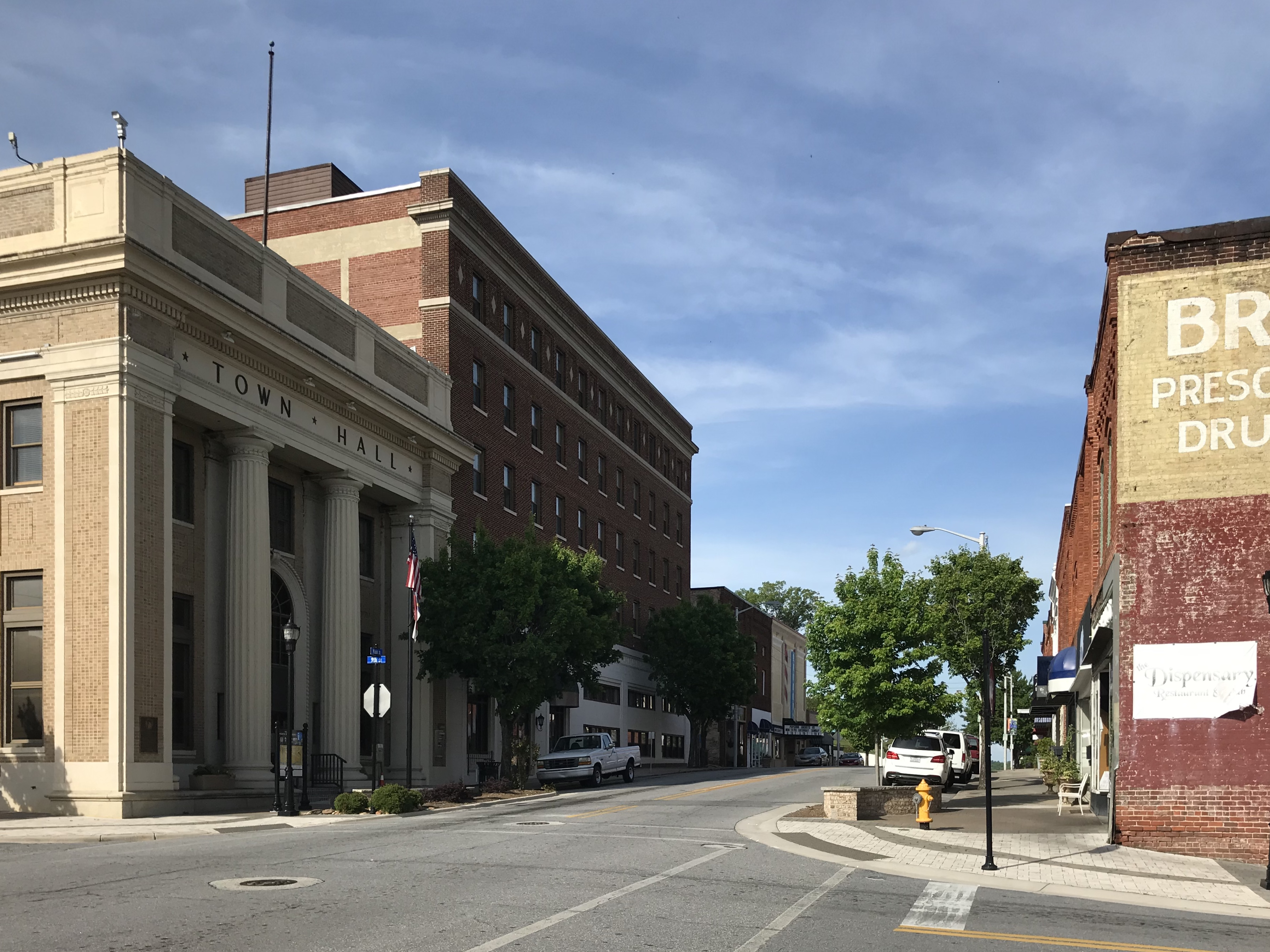
- Downtown North Wilkesboro with Town Hall on the Left
Interactive Map of North Wilkesboro, NC μSA
Town of North Wilkesboro
Town of Wilkesboro
North Wilkesboro, NC μSA
- Country: United States
- State: North Carolina
- Largest city: North Wilkesboro
- Other cities: Wilkesboro
- Time zone: UTC−5 (EST)
  - Summer (DST): UTC−4 (EDT)

The North Wilkesboro Micropolitan Statistical Area, as defined by the United States Census Bureau, is a populated area consisting of the whole of Wilkes County, North Carolina, anchored by the town of North Wilkesboro.

== Demographics ==
As of the census of 2010, there were 69,340 people, 28,360 households, and 19,683 families residing within the μSA. The racial makeup of the μSA was 90.60% White, 4.08% African American, 0.19% Native American, 0.43% Asian, 0.03% Pacific Islander, 3.33% from other races, and 1.33% from two or more races. Hispanic or Latino of any race were 5.44% of the population.

The median income for a household in the μSA was $31,869, and the median income for a family was $39,980. Males had a median income of $32,237 versus $25,368 for females. The per capita income for the μSA was $16,797.

== See also ==
- Table of United States Micropolitan Statistical Areas
- North Carolina statistical areas
