= Mason–Hardee–Capel House =

Historic house in North Carolina, United States

- U.S. National Register of Historic Places
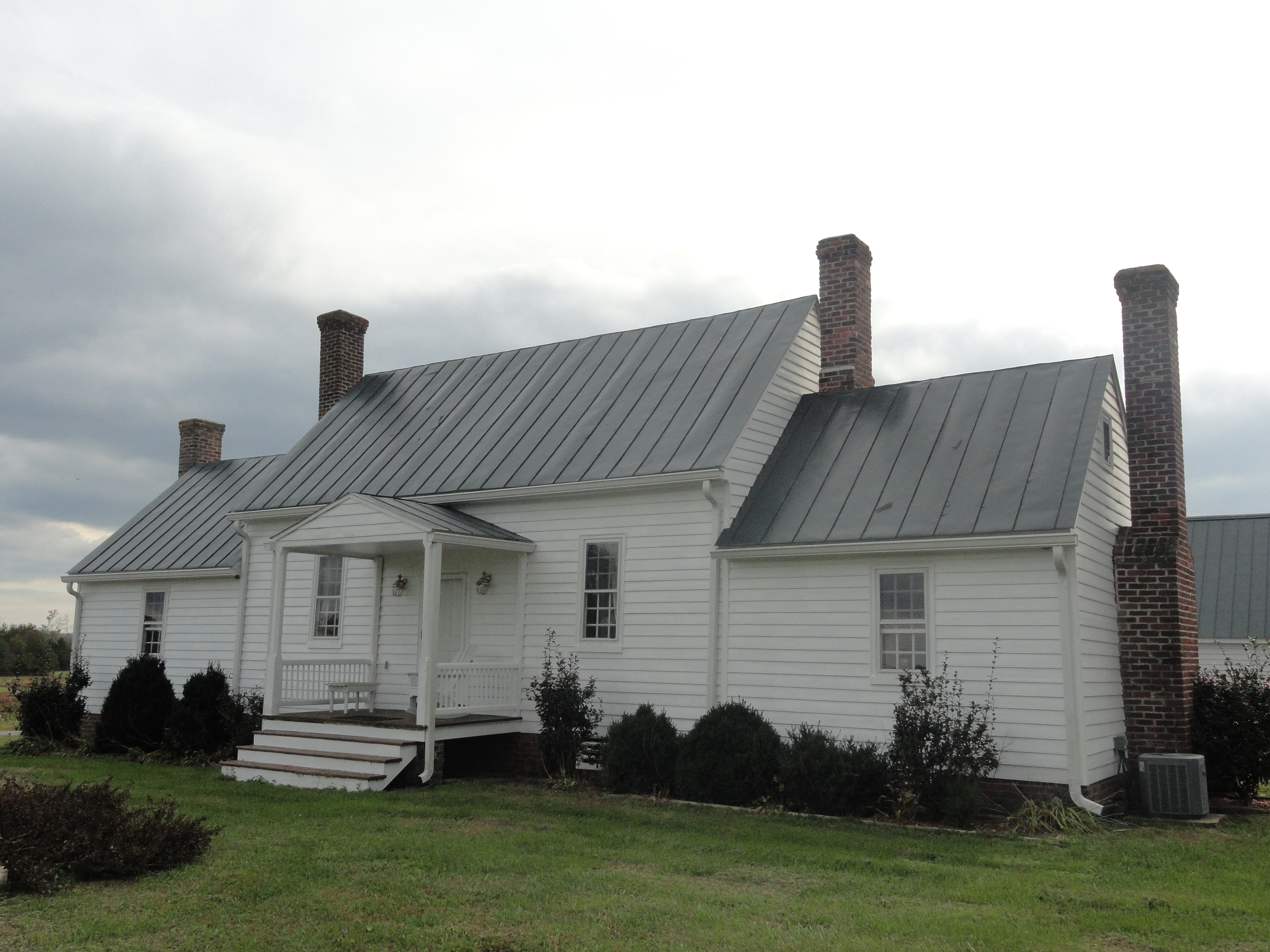

- Location within North Carolina Location within the United States
- Location: NC 1308, 0.8 miles (1.3 km) west of NC 1307, Garysburg, North Carolina
- Coordinates: 36°27′22″N 77°30′30″W
- Area: 1.8 acres (0.73 ha)
- Built: c. 1775, c. 1840
- Architectural style: Georgian
- NRHP reference No.: 04001587
- Added to NRHP: February 2, 2005

Mason–Hardee–Capel House is a historic home located near Garysburg, Northampton County, North Carolina. It was built about 1775, as a one-story-with-attic, hall-parlor plan, Georgian style frame dwelling. It has a gable roof and features massive gable-end brick chimneys. About 1840, a formerly detached 1 1/2-story kitchen was attached to the west gable end.

It was listed on the National Register of Historic Places in 2005.

The house was sold by Daniel Mason and his wife, Dorothy to William Hardee in 1813 for the sum of $2,500. The house belonged to Daniel's father, a fact which is noted in the Bible belonging to Lawrence S. Mason and his wife, Sarah Gray Hyde: "On page printed 'Births'--"L.S. Mason, son of Daniel Mason and Dorothy L.S. Mason was born on the 8th of October 1809 at his grandfather's 5 miles from Northampton Court House in Northampton Cty, North Carolina."

Lawrence Mason and Sarah Hyde married in 1833, and he died two years later. His widow later married Thomas Jefferson Jennings at Nacogdoches, Texas. Jennings was Attorney General for Texas from 1852 to 1856 and the Tarrant County, Texas Archives are home to the 'Samuel Alexander Denny/Jennings Family Collection,' which includes the Bible of Lawrence S. Mason.
