= List of metropolitan areas of North Carolina =

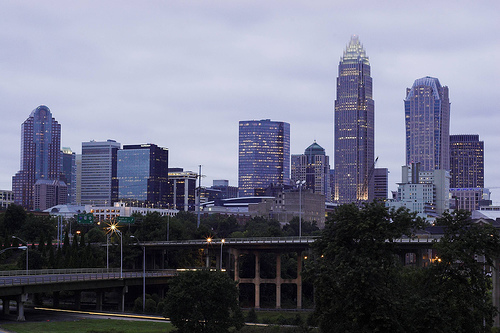
Charlotte, largest city and metropolitan area

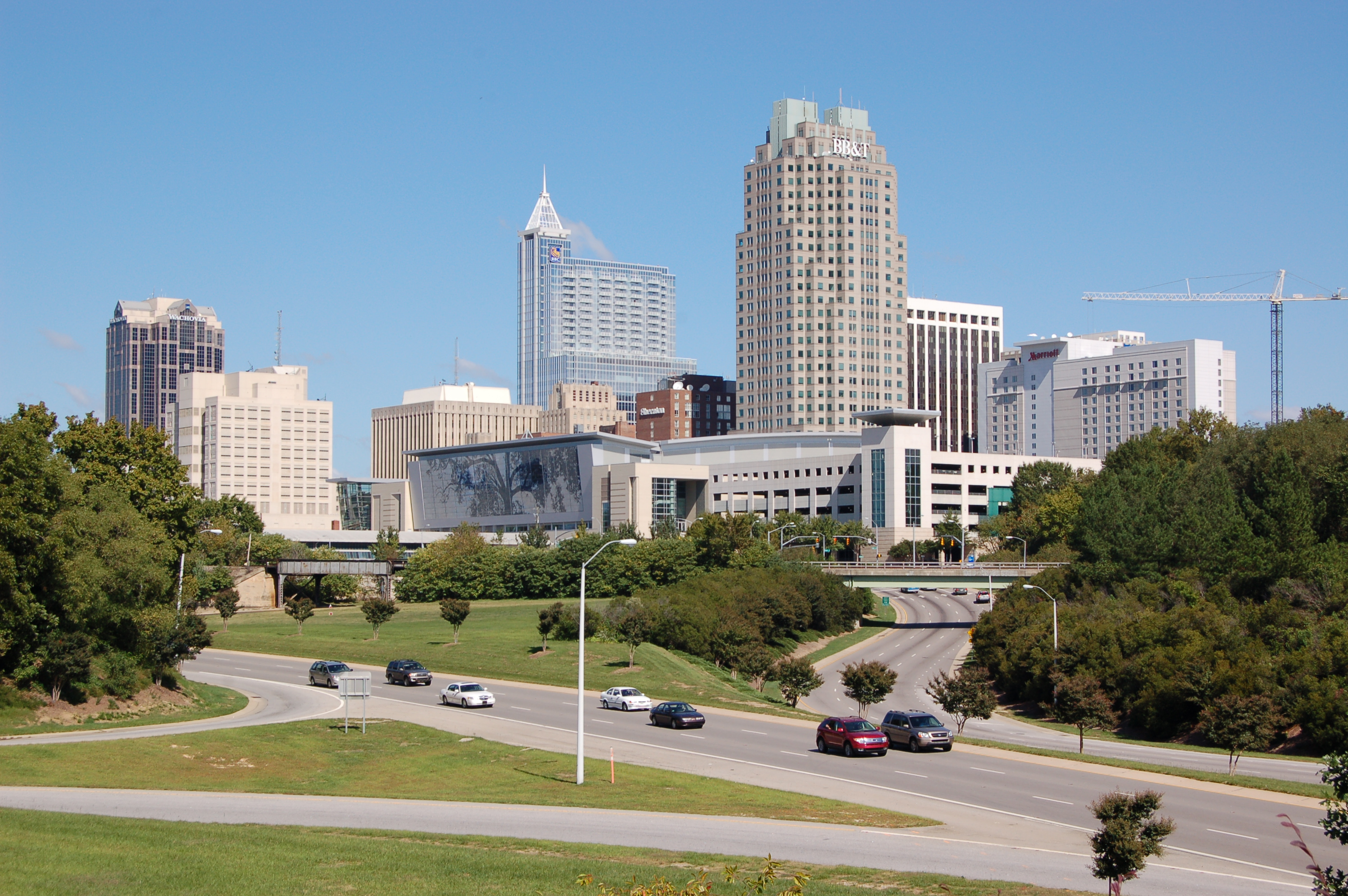
Raleigh, second largest metropolitan area

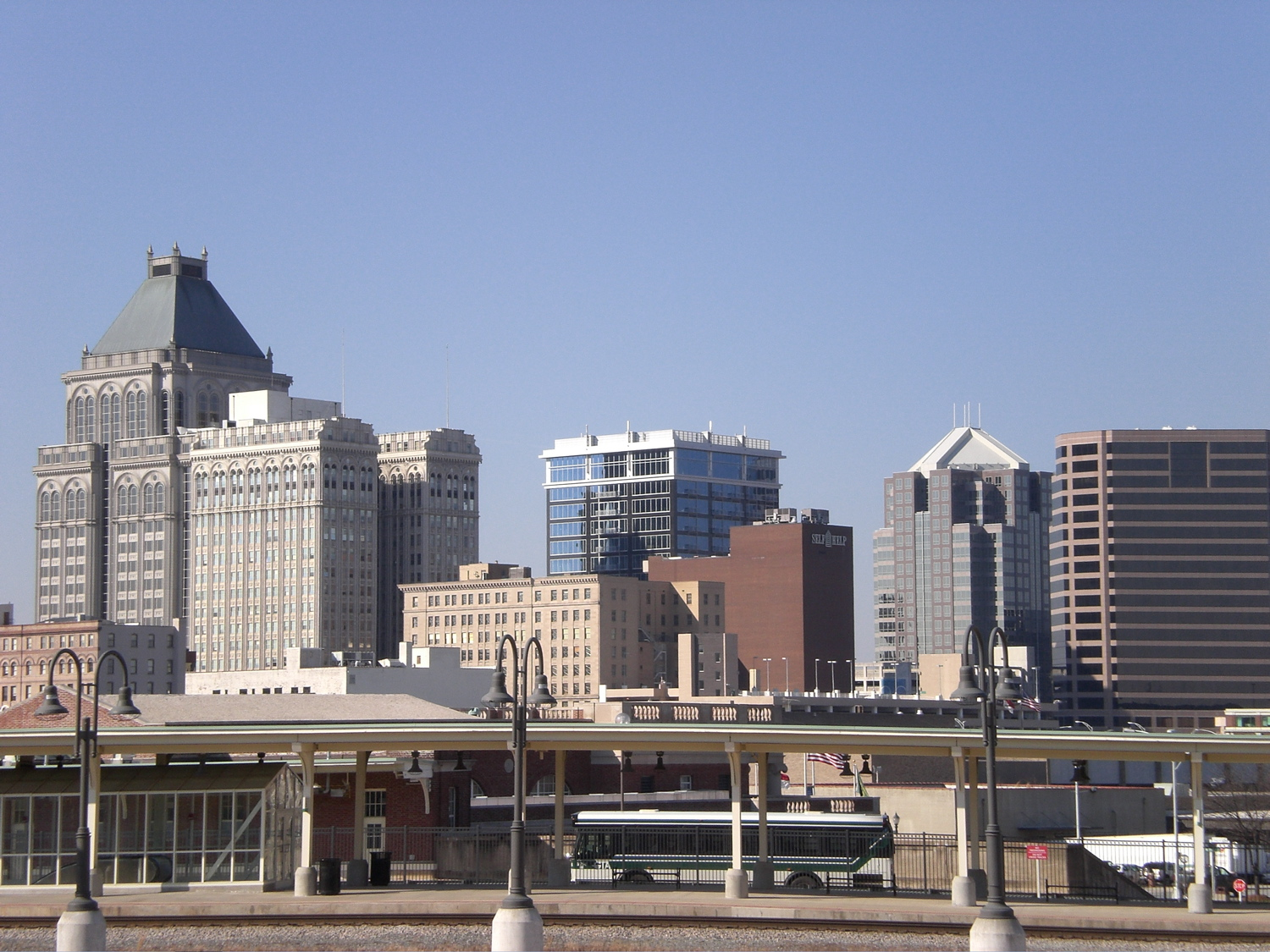
Greensboro, third largest metropolitan area

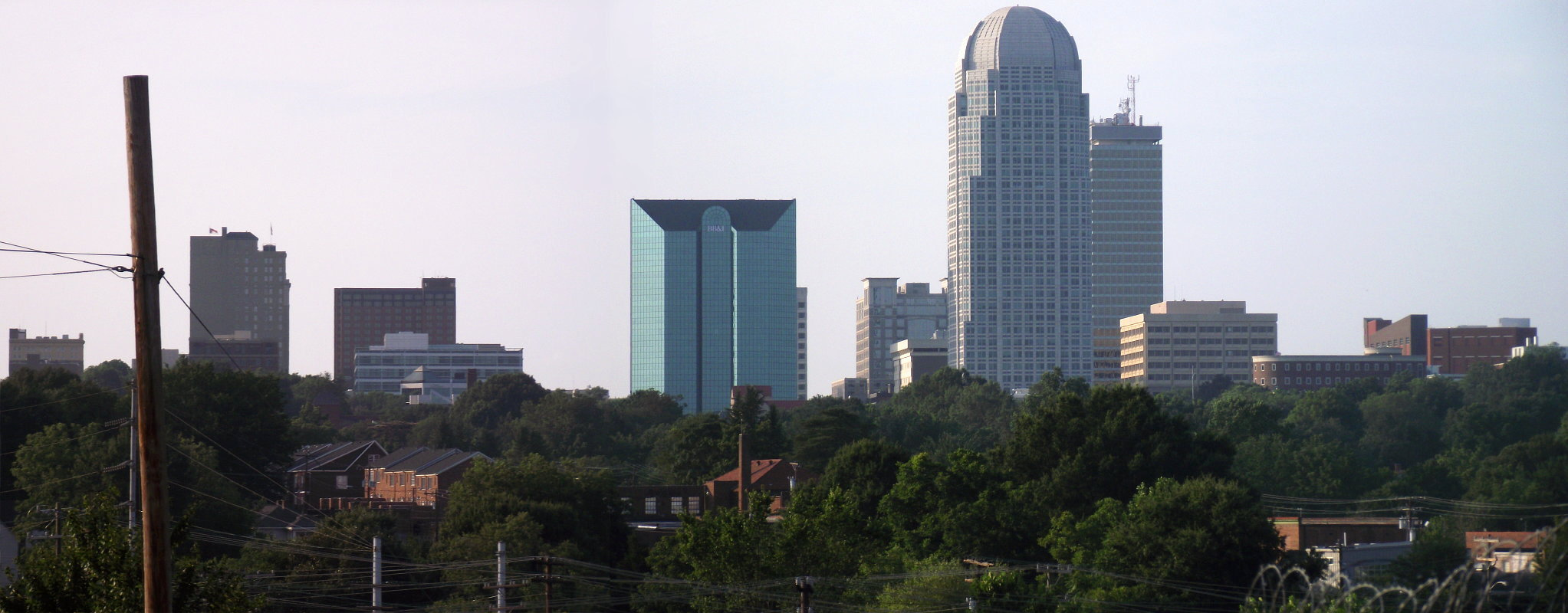
Winston-Salem, fourth largest metropolitan area

The Charlotte–Concord–Gastonia MSA (as well as the Charlotte–Concord CSA) includes counties in South Carolina.

N.C. Rank	U.S. Rank	Metropolitan Statistical Area	Population (2023 est.)
1	22	Charlotte–Concord–Gastonia	2,805,115
2	41	Raleigh–Cary	1,509,231
3	78	Greensboro–High Point	789,842
4	86	Winston-Salem	695,630
5	94	Durham–Chapel Hill	608,879
6	115	Wilmington	467,337
7	131	Asheville	417,202
8	142	Fayetteville	392,336
9	150	Hickory–Lenoir–Morganton	370,030
10	219	Jacksonville	213,676
11	249	Burlington	179,165
12	252	Greenville	175,119
13	295	Rocky Mount	145,383
14	333	Goldsboro	118,686
15	349	Pinehurst–Southern Pines	106,898

N.C. Rank	U.S. Rank	Combined Statistical Area	Population (2023 est.)
1	19	Charlotte–Concord	3,387,115
2	31	Raleigh–Durham–Cary	2,368,947
3	37	Greensboro–Winston-Salem–High Point	1,736,099
4	75	Fayetteville–Lumberton–Pinehurst	693,299
5	89	Asheville–Waynesville–Brevard	513,720
6	119	Rocky Mount–Wilson–Roanoke Rapids	288,366
7	137	Greenville–Washington	219,600
8	145	New Bern–Morehead City	193,830

== See also ==
- Table of United States Metropolitan Statistical Areas
- Table of United States Combined Statistical Areas
