= Q. J. Stephenson =

American trapper (1920–1997)

Quinton Judson Stephenson (1920–1997) was a trapper, naturalist, and self-taught artist from Garysburg, North Carolina. He is known for his "Occoneechee Trapper's Lodge" (or "Trapper's Lodge Museum"), a natural history museum and art environment in Garysburg.

== Biography ==
Q. J. Stephenson was born in 1920 in Garysburg, North Carolina. The son of a traveling salesman, Stephenson grew up in the lean years of the Great Depression, trapping muskrat, mink, and raccoons in the woods and selling their pelts to Sears & Roebuck. In his teenage years, he would travel to northern California with the Civilian Conservation Corps, an experience that he would later credit with his interest in and love of nature. When he returned home, he operated a crane with a dragline, which led to the unexpected discovery of fossils, petrified wood, Civil War artifacts, and other relics from the North Carolina environment. Through the donation of some of these objects, Stephenson developed a relationship with the Smithsonian Institution.

In the 1950s, out of concern that younger generations were not properly learning traditional naturalist and trapping methods, Stephenson began an artistic endeavor that spanned 50 years of production and manifested itself in the Occoneechee Trapper's Lodge and his self-termed "Prehistoric Art."

In 1997, Stephenson died in Garysburg.

== Occoneechee Trapper's Lodge ==
The Occoneechee Trapper's Lodge is a natural history museum and art environment created by Stephenson to illustrate local natural history features and impart his own personal philosophies and knowledge. The construction process involved the gradual accretion of sculptures, fossils, shells, petrified wood, and other found objects, which adorned a small cement and wood building on his property. Stephenson covered much of the external surface of the building with cast cement plates, each embellished with mosaics of natural particulates and imprinted with written philosophies, histories, lessons, and didactic labels. Some of these plates are hung from brackets on the walls, while others are embedded directly into the cement foundation which spills out into the surrounding landscape. Cypress knees are affixed to the overhanging ledges and jut up from the surrounding grounds, resembling stalagmites and stalactites in a cave. The interior of the lodge is also encrusted with similar panels and assemblages, although more vibrant and untouched by the external elements.

In the 1970s, Stephenson began producing "Prehistoric Art," creating fantastic creatures from his imagination out of cement and found objects. He would position these sculptures in and around the Trapper's Lodge to amuse himself and visitors.

In addition to the lodge building, Stephenson constructed other smaller works on the property in the same creative method and style. These include a windmill, table and bench, bell, and planter.

Pieces made by Stephenson and fragments from the environment have made their way into several public and private collections, one notable example being the Smithsonian American Art Museum.

As of 2016, the Occoneechee Trapper's Lodge still exists on Stephenson's property in Garysburg. However, natural and man-made destruction has led to noticeable degradation and loss of the environment.
