= Vollis Simpson =

American folk artist and dramatist (1919–2013)

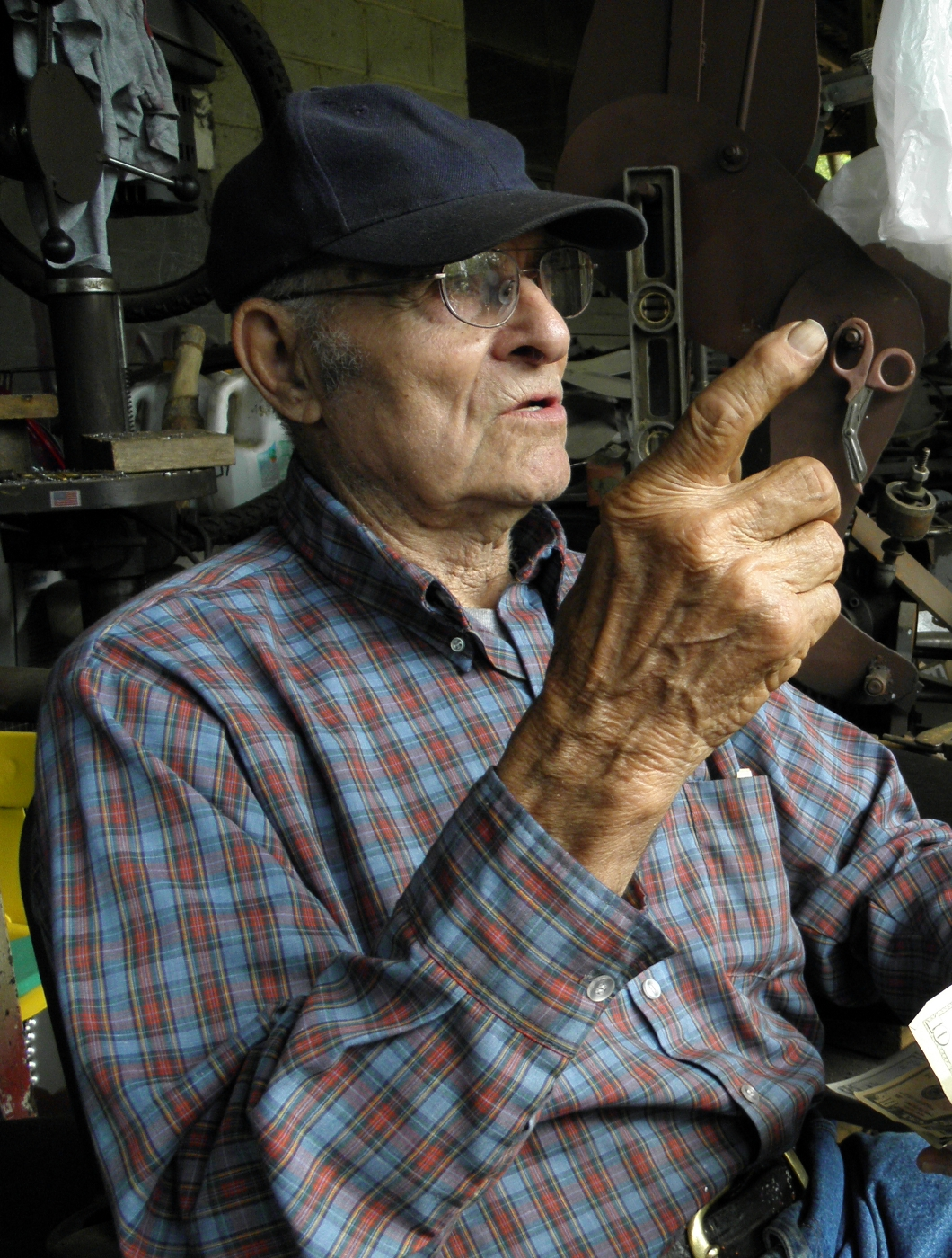
- Simpson in 2011
- Born: 1919
- Died: May 31, 2013 (aged 94); Lucama, North Carolina
- Years active: c. 1984-2013
- Known for: Whirligig folk art

Vollis Simpson (1919 – May 31, 2013) was an American "outsider" folk artist known for large kinetic sculptures called "whirligigs", which Simpson made from salvaged metal. He lived and worked in Lucama, North Carolina. Many of his larger pieces are on display at the Vollis Simpson Whirligig Park in Wilson, North Carolina, about 10 miles from Lucama.

== Life before art ==
"[I've been a] farmhouse mover, electric welder, carpenter, the list goes on. If you don't try something, you don't learn anything. Common sense. You come across a lot of these people that know so damn much, sometimes you find out they're dumber than I am..."

— Vollis Simpson, from PBS documentary about Simpson's life

Vollis Simpson was born January 17, 1919, to Oscar and Emma Watson Simpson of Spring Hill Township in Wilson County, North Carolina. According to his wife, Jean Simpson, he was 8th of 12 children. He left school after the 11th grade.

Though not attracted to farming, Simpson found work servicing the farm's equipment, such as the threshers, bailers, tractors, and pumps which are used in farming.

Simpson served in the US Army Air Corps during World War II in the Pacific Theatre. He demonstrated his intuitive engineering skills while stationed on Saipan in the Northern Marianas Islands, where he constructed a windmill out of parts from a junk B-29 Superfortress bomber to power a washing machine for his company.

After the war, Simpson founded a house-moving operation with his brothers to supplement the income from the family farm. He designed and built much of the heavy equipment they used to move houses, creating a first of its kind crop sprayer. He also ran a machine shop for decades.

The 1940 United States Census shows Simpson living at home with his parents, two sisters – Hazel, four years older, Eleanor, five years younger – and younger brother, Daryl. His occupation is listed as "farming".

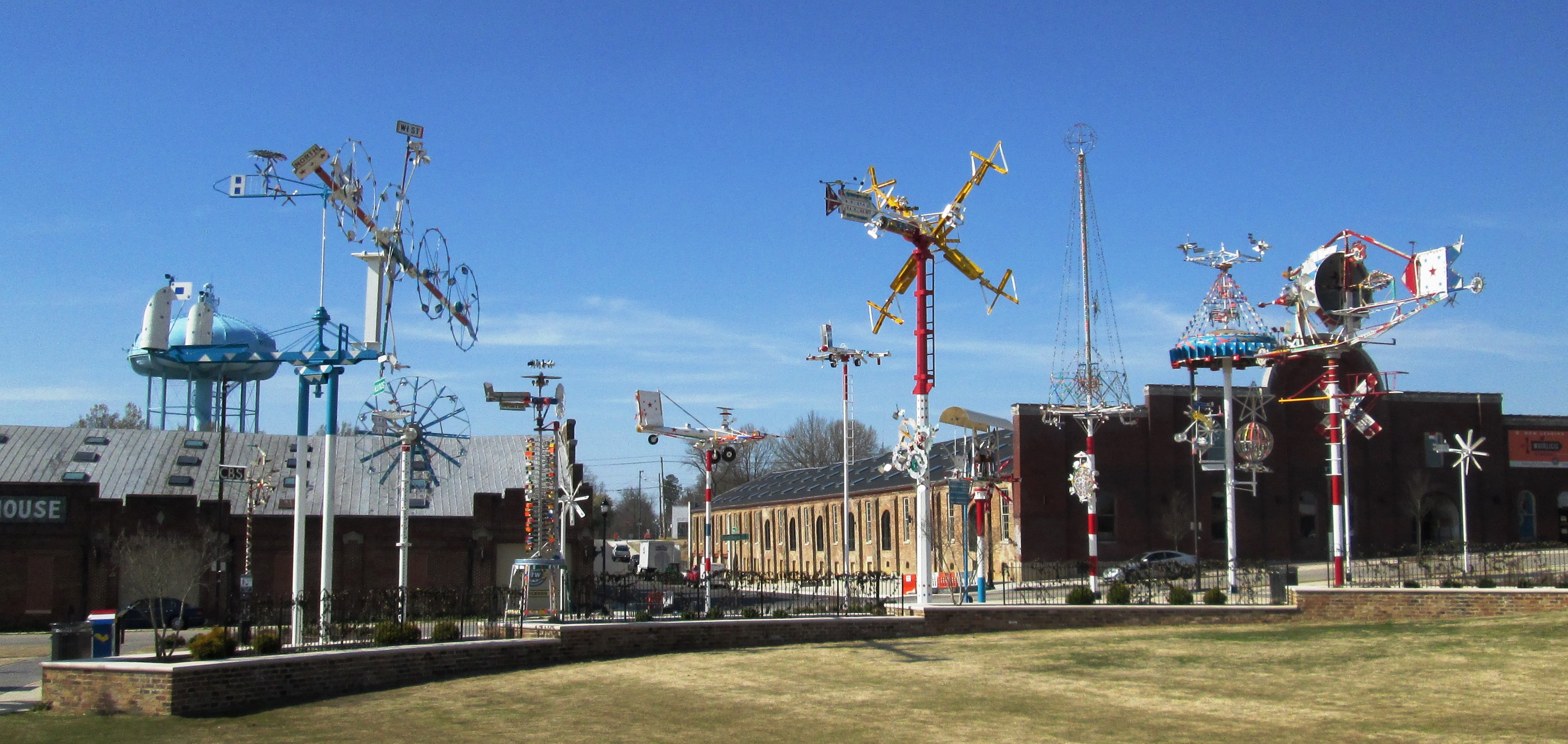
Whirligig Park in Wilson, North Carolina (2019)

== Art career ==
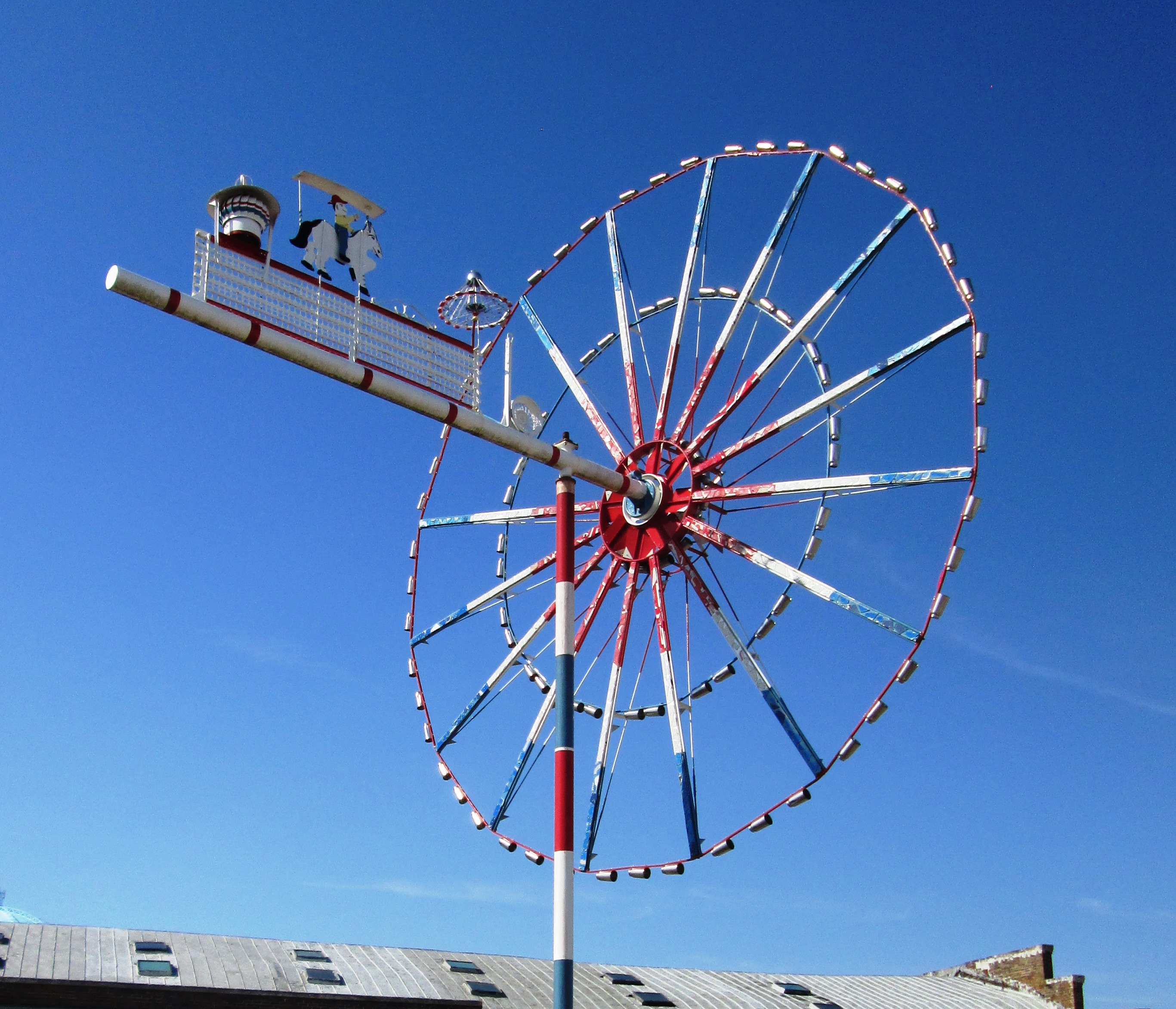
One of Simpson's Whirligigs from the park in Wilson

Simpson retired at the age of 65, and began to build wind-driven structures which he called "windmills", but came to be called whirligigs. He built a number of large whirligigs on his property in Lucama surrounding a pond across from his workshop. This was referred to by locals as "Acid Park" because of how the sculptures would reflect car headlights when people came out after dark.

Simpson was commissioned to create a whirligig for the American Visionary Art Museum in Baltimore. The 55-foot (17 m) high, 45-foot (14 m) wide whirligig called "Life, Liberty and the Pursuit of Happiness" was installed for the museum's opening in November, 1995. He was also commissioned to create whirligigs for the 1996 Summer Olympics in Atlanta. Four of his works were installed at the Olympic Folk Art Park and remained there on permanent display.

Other of Simpson's whirligigs have been exhibited at the American Folk Art Museum in New York City and at the Abby Aldrich Rockefeller Folk Art Museum in Williamsburg, Virginia. Some of his sculptures have sold for thousands of dollars.

== Recognition ==
In 2004, Wilson, North Carolina, held its first annual Wilson Whirligig Festival. The festival was renamed in 2016 to the North Carolina Whirligig Festival, and is usually held the first full weekend of November. The Vollis Simpson Whirligig Park was created in Wilson to document, conserve, and display the large sculptures from Simpson's land in Lucama. The park had its grand opening on November 2, 2017. Simpson acted as a consultant for the renovation of the whirligigs for display.

The North Carolina legislature recognized Simpson's contributions and in June 2013 designated Simpson's Whirligigs as the official folk art of North Carolina.

== Death ==
Simpson died at his home in his sleep on May 31, 2013. He was 94.
