= South Weldon, North Carolina =

- Census-designated place
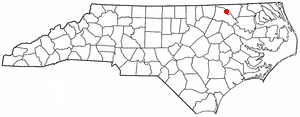
- Location of SouthWeldon, North Carolina
- Coordinates: 36°24′49″N 77°36′09″W
- Country: United States
- State: North Carolina
- County: Halifax

Area
  - Total: 0.44 sq mi (1.13 km^{2})
  - Land: 0.44 sq mi (1.13 km^{2})
  - Water: 0 sq mi (0.00 km^{2})
- Elevation: 75 ft (23 m)

Population (2020)
  - Total: 550
  - Density: 1,263.1/sq mi (487.68/km^{2})
- Time zone: UTC-5 (Eastern (EST))
  - Summer (DST): UTC-4 (EDT)
- ZIP code: 27890
- Area code: 252
- FIPS code: 37-63560
- GNIS feature ID: 2402882

South Weldon is an unincorporated community and census-designated place (CDP) in Halifax County, North Carolina, United States. As of the 2020 census, South Weldon had a population of 550. It is part of the Roanoke Rapids, North Carolina Micropolitan Statistical Area.

== Geography ==
South Weldon is located in northern Halifax County and is bordered to the north and west by the town of Weldon. U.S. Route 301 forms the eastern border of South Weldon; the highway runs north into Weldon and south 6 miles (10 km) to Halifax, the county seat.

According to the United States Census Bureau, the South Weldon CDP has a total area of 0.44 square miles (1.13 km^{2}), all land.

== Demographics ==
Historical population
Census	Pop.	Note	%±
2000	1,414		—
2010	705		−50.1%
2020	550		−22.0%
U.S. Decennial Census

=== 2020 census ===
South Weldon CDP, North Carolina – Racial and ethnic composition Note: the US Census treats Hispanic/Latino as an ethnic category. This table excludes Latinos from the racial categories and assigns them to a separate category. Hispanics/Latinos may be of any race.
Race / Ethnicity (NH = Non-Hispanic)	Pop 2000	Pop 2010	Pop 2020	% 2000	% 2010	% 2020
White alone (NH)	188	99	45	13.30%	14.04%	8.18%
Black or African American alone (NH)	1,198	548	481	84.72%	77.73%	87.45%
Native American or Alaska Native alone (NH)	4	8	0	0.28%	1.13%	0.00%
Asian alone (NH)	1	1	0	0.07%	0.14%	0.00%
Native Hawaiian or Pacific Islander alone (NH)	0	0	0	0.00%	0.00%	0.00%
Other race alone (NH)	0	0	1	0.00%	0.00%	0.18%
Mixed race or Multiracial (NH)	18	13	15	1.27%	1.84%	2.73%
Hispanic or Latino (any race)	5	36	8	0.35%	5.11%	1.45%
Total	1,414	705	550	100.00%	100.00%	100.00%

=== 2000 census ===
As of the census of 2000, there were 1,414 people, 497 households, and 375 families residing in the CDP. The population density was 505.9 people per square mile (195.3 people/km^{2}). There were 587 housing units at an average density of 210.0 per square mile (81.1/km^{2}). The racial makeup of the CDP was 13.44% White, 84.79% African American, 0.28% Native American, 0.07% Asian, 0.07% from other races, and 1.34% from two or more races. Hispanic or Latino of any race were 0.35% of the population.

There were 497 households, out of which 36.2% had children under the age of 18 living with them, 35.8% were married couples living together, 35.0% had a female householder with no husband present, and 24.5% were non-families. 22.7% of all households were made up of individuals, and 11.5% had someone living alone who was 65 years of age or older. The average household size was 2.85 and the average family size was 3.32.

In the CDP, the population was spread out, with 31.9% under the age of 18, 9.4% from 18 to 24, 25.5% from 25 to 44, 20.5% from 45 to 64, and 12.7% who were 65 years of age or older. The median age was 33 years. For every 100 females, there were 79.0 males. For every 100 females age 18 and over, there were 72.3 males.

The median income for a household in the CDP was $16,000, and the median income for a family was $21,033. Males had a median income of $27,176 versus $18,594 for females. The per capita income for the CDP was $8,845. About 38.5% of families and 42.8% of the population were below the poverty line, including 55.5% of those under age 18 and 21.6% of those age 65 or over.
