= Heathsville, North Carolina =

Unincorporated community in North Carolina, US

Coordinates: 36°16′10″N 77°45′53″W

- Interactive map of Heathsville, North Carolina
- Elevation: 63 m (207 ft)
- GNIS feature ID: 1006235

Heathsville is an unincorporated community in Halifax County, North Carolina, United States. It is part of the Roanoke Rapids, North Carolina Micropolitan Statistical Area.

The community is located along North Carolina Highway 561.
