= Roanoke Rapids micropolitan area =

Roanoke Rapids
- Micropolitan Statistical Area
- Roanoke Rapids, NC Micropolitan Statistical Area
- Rocky Mount Metropolitan Statistical Area Wilson Micropolitan Statistical Area Roanoke Rapids Micropolitan Statistical Area
- Country: United States
- State: North Carolina
- Principal cities: Rocky Mount; Tarboro; Nashville

Area
  - Total: 1,046 sq mi (2,710 km^{2})

Population (2017 Census estimate)
  - Density: 140/sq mi (54/km^{2})
  - MSA: 146,738
- Time zone: EST
  - Summer (DST): EDT
- Area code: 252

The Roanoke Rapids, NC Micropolitan Statistical Area (μSA) as defined by the United States Census Bureau, is an area consisting of two counties in North Carolina, anchored by the city of Roanoke Rapids.

As of the 2000 census, the μSA had a population of 79,456 (though a July 1, 2009 estimate placed the population at 74,716).

== Counties ==
- Halifax
- Northampton

== Communities ==
- Places with more than 10,000 inhabitants
  - Roanoke Rapids (Principal city)
- Places with 1,000 to 10,000 inhabitants
  - Enfield
  - Garysburg
  - Scotland Neck
  - South Rosemary (census-designated place)
  - South Weldon (census-designated place)
  - Weldon
- Places with 750 to 1,000 inhabitants
  - Gaston
  - Rich Square
  - Woodland
- Places with 500 to 750 inhabitants
  - Conway
  - Jackson
  - Littleton
  - Seaboard
- Places with less than 500 inhabitants
  - Halifax
  - Hobgood
  - Lasker
  - Severn
- Unincorporated places
  - Aurelian Springs
  - Brinkleyville
  - Heathsville
  - Margarettsville
  - Pleasant Hill

== Demographics ==
As of the census of 2000, there were 79,456 people, 30,813 households, and 21,261 families residing within the μSA. The racial makeup of the μSA was 41.60% White, 54.47% African American, 2.36% Native American, 0.42% Asian, 0.03% Pacific Islander, 0.44% from other races, and 0.68% from two or more races. Hispanic or Latino of any race were 0.93% of the population.

The median income for a household in the μSA was $26,556, and the median income for a family was $34,082. Males had a median income of $27,998 versus $20,854 for females. The per capita income for the μSA was $14,612.

== See also ==
- North Carolina census statistical areas
