= Garysburg, North Carolina =

- Town
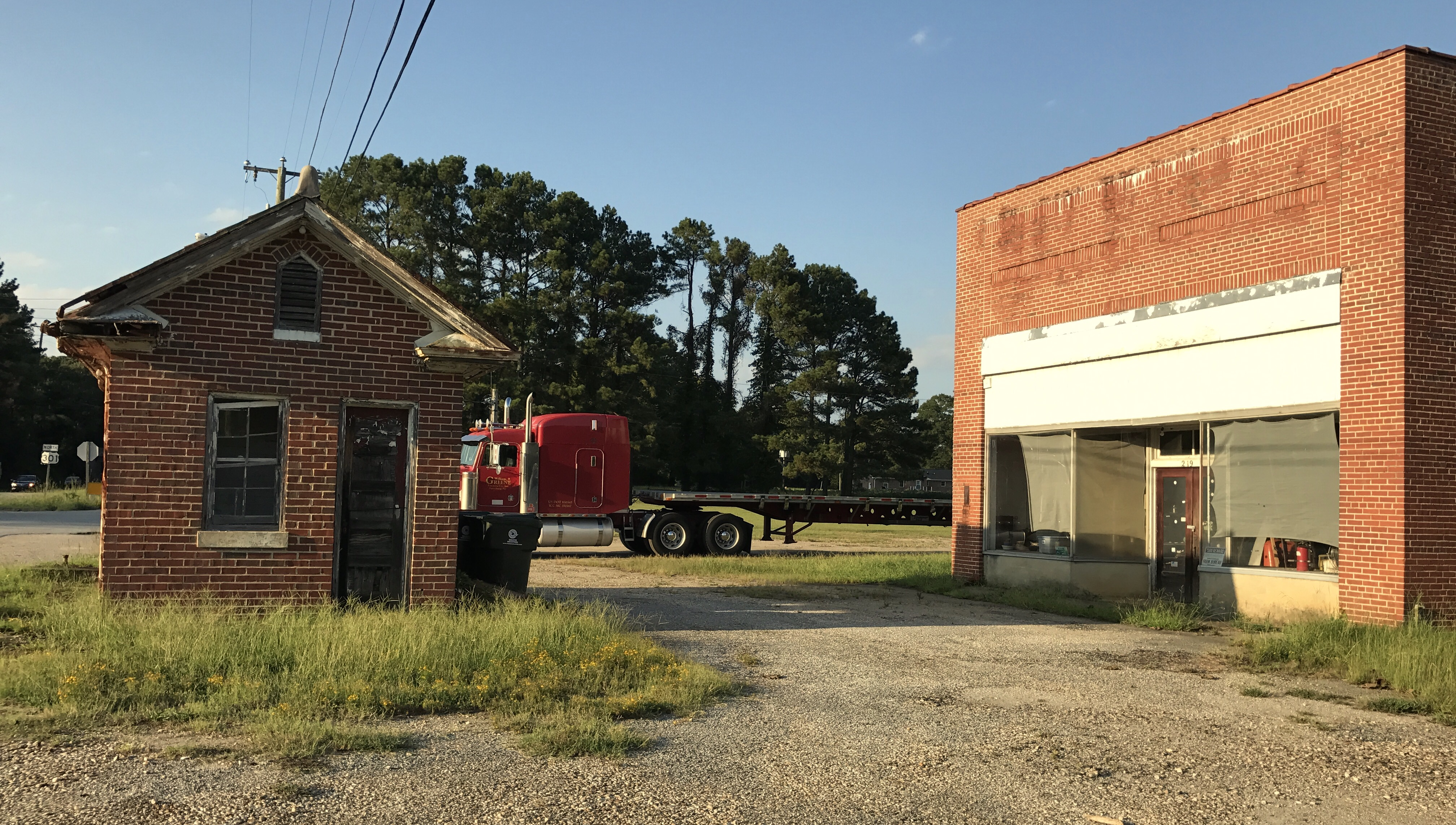

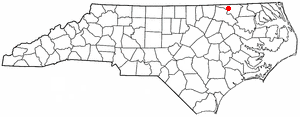
- Location of Garysburg, North Carolina
- Coordinates: 36°26′52″N 77°33′37″W
- Country: United States
- State: North Carolina
- County: Northampton

Area
  - Total: 0.94 sq mi (2.44 km^{2})
  - Land: 0.94 sq mi (2.44 km^{2})
  - Water: 0 sq mi (0.00 km^{2})
- Elevation: 138 ft (42 m)

Population (2020)
  - Total: 904
  - Density: 958.2/sq mi (369.95/km^{2})
- Time zone: UTC-5 (Eastern (EST))
  - Summer (DST): UTC-4 (EDT)
- ZIP code: 27831
- Area code: 252
- FIPS code: 37-25540
- GNIS feature ID: 2406548
- Website: https://www.townofgarysburgnc.org/

Garysburg is a town in Northampton County, North Carolina, United States. As of the 2020 census, Garysburg had a population of 904. It is part of the Roanoke Rapids, North Carolina Micropolitan Statistical Area.

== History ==
Garysburg is named for Roderick B. Gary.

The Garysburg United Methodist Church and Cemetery and Mason-Hardee-Capel House are listed on the National Register of Historic Places. In 1848, Garysburg was a stop on the Petersburg Railroad.

== Geography ==
According to the United States Census Bureau, the town has a total area of 1.0 square mile (2.6 km^{2}), all land.

== Demographics ==
Historical population
Census	Pop.	Note	%±
1880	97		—
1900	269		—
1910	169		−37.2%
1920	203		20.1%
1930	284		39.9%
1940	320		12.7%
1950	344		7.5%
1960	181		−47.4%
1970	231		27.6%
1980	1,434		520.8%
1990	1,057		−26.3%
2000	1,254		18.6%
2010	1,057		−15.7%
2020	904		−14.5%
U.S. Decennial Census

=== 2020 census ===
Garysburg racial composition
Race	Number	Percentage
White (non-Hispanic)	21	2.32%
Black or African American (non-Hispanic)	862	95.35%
Asian	1	0.11%
Other/Mixed	14	1.55%
Hispanic or Latino	6	0.66%

As of the 2020 United States census, there were 904 people, 414 households, and 267 families residing in the town.

=== 2010 census ===
As of the 2010 United States census, there were 1,057 people living in the town. The racial makeup of the town was 95.0% Black, 2.4% White, 0.9% Native American and 1.0% from two or more races. 0.8% were Hispanic or Latino of any race.

=== 2000 census ===
As of the census of 2000, there were 1,254 people, 482 households, and 334 families living in the town. The population density was 1,302.4 inhabitants per square mile (502.9/km^{2}). There were 526 housing units at an average density of 546.3 per square mile (210.9/km^{2}). The racial makeup of the town was 2.39% White, 96.09% African American, 0.64% Native American, 0.24% Asian, 0.40% from other races, and 0.24% from two or more races. Hispanic or Latino of any race were 0.40% of the population.

There were 482 households, out of which 29.3% had children under the age of 18 living with them, 34.4% were married couples living together, 30.9% had a female householder with no husband present, and 30.5% were non-families. 27.8% of all households were made up of individuals, and 12.4% had someone living alone who was 65 years of age or older. The average household size was 2.59 and the average family size was 3.16.

In the town, the population was spread out, with 28.1% under the age of 18, 8.5% from 18 to 24, 24.5% from 25 to 44, 24.0% from 45 to 64, and 14.9% who were 65 years of age or older. The median age was 38 years. For every 100 females, there were 81.5 males. For every 100 females age 18 and over, there were 73.3 males.

The median income for a household in the town was $22,604, and the median income for a family was $27,386. Males had a median income of $23,333 versus $20,682 for females. The per capita income for the town was $14,172. About 22.9% of families and 28.4% of the population were below the poverty line, including 34.8% of those under age 18 and 25.2% of those age 65 or over.

== Notable people ==
- Keion Crossen, NFL cornerback and Super Bowl LIII champion with the New England Patriots
- Q. J. Stephenson, trapper, naturalist, and self-taught artist
