= South Rosemary, North Carolina =

- Census-designated place
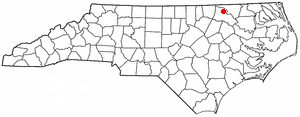
- Location of South Rosemary, North Carolina
- Coordinates: 36°26′47″N 77°42′23″W
- Country: United States
- State: North Carolina
- County: Halifax

Area
  - Total: 6.13 sq mi (15.87 km^{2})
  - Land: 6.12 sq mi (15.85 km^{2})
  - Water: 0.0077 sq mi (0.02 km^{2})
- Elevation: 243 ft (74 m)

Population (2020)
  - Total: 2,753
  - Density: 450/sq mi (173.7/km^{2})
- Time zone: UTC-5 (Eastern (EST))
  - Summer (DST): UTC-4 (EDT)
- ZIP code: 27870
- Area code: 252
- FIPS code: 37-63470
- GNIS feature ID: 2402876

South Rosemary is an unincorporated area and census-designated place (CDP) in Halifax County, North Carolina, United States. As of the 2020 census, South Rosemary had a population of 2,753. It is part of the Roanoke Rapids, North Carolina Micropolitan Statistical Area.

== Geography ==
South Rosemary is located in northern Halifax County and is bordered to the east by the city of Roanoke Rapids.

U.S. Route 158 is the main road through the community, leading east into Roanoke Rapids and west 45 miles (72 km) to Henderson.

According to the United States Census Bureau, the CDP has a total area of 6.1 square miles (15.9 km^{2}), of which 0.01 square miles (0.02 km^{2}), or 0.10%, is water.

== Demographics ==
Historical population
Census	Pop.	Note	%±
2000	2,843		—
2010	2,836		−0.2%
2020	2,753		−2.9%
U.S. Decennial Census

=== Racial and ethnic composition ===
South Rosemary CDP, North Carolina – Racial and ethnic composition Note: the US Census treats Hispanic/Latino as an ethnic category. This table excludes Latinos from the racial categories and assigns them to a separate category. Hispanics/Latinos may be of any race.
Race / Ethnicity (NH = Non-Hispanic)	Pop 2000	Pop 2010	Pop 2020	% 2000	% 2010	% 2020
White alone (NH)	1,393	1,173	1,049	49.00%	41.36%	38.10%
Black or African American alone (NH)	1,405	1,563	1,519	49.42%	55.11%	55.18%
Native American or Alaska Native alone (NH)	3	22	9	0.11%	0.78%	0.33%
Asian alone (NH)	6	10	1	0.21%	0.35%	0.04%
Native Hawaiian or Pacific Islander alone (NH)	0	0	1	0.00%	0.00%	0.04%
Other race alone (NH)	2	2	4	0.07%	0.07%	0.15%
Mixed race or Multiracial (NH)	14	26	82	0.49%	0.92%	2.98%
Hispanic or Latino (any race)	20	40	88	0.70%	1.41%	3.20%
Total	2,843	2,836	2,753	100.00%	100.00%	100.00%

=== 2020 census ===
As of the 2020 census, South Rosemary had a population of 2,753. The median age was 43.8 years. 21.5% of residents were under the age of 18 and 22.2% were 65 years of age or older. For every 100 females, there were 88.6 males, and for every 100 females age 18 and over, there were 87.0 males.

67.6% of residents lived in urban areas, while 32.4% lived in rural areas.

There were 1,200 households, of which 23.5% had children under the age of 18 living in them. Of all households, 33.6% were married-couple households, 21.9% were households with a male householder and no spouse or partner present, and 37.9% were households with a female householder and no spouse or partner present. About 31.9% of all households were made up of individuals, and 13.7% had someone living alone who was 65 years of age or older.

There were 1,356 housing units, of which 11.5% were vacant. The homeowner vacancy rate was 1.0% and the rental vacancy rate was 11.1%.

=== 2000 census ===
As of the census of 2000, there were 2,843 people, 1,184 households, and 790 families residing in the CDP. The population density was 462.0 people per square mile (178.4 people/km^{2}). There were 1,366 housing units at an average density of 222.0 per square mile (85.7/km^{2}). The racial makeup of the CDP was 49.35% White, 49.49% African American, 0.28% Native American, 0.21% Asian, 0.14% from other races, and 0.53% from two or more races. Hispanic or Latino of any race were 0.70% of the population.

There were 1,184 households, out of which 29.2% had children under the age of 18 living with them, 42.5% were married couples living together, 18.7% had a female householder with no husband present, and 33.2% were non-families. 29.0% of all households were made up of individuals, and 9.4% had someone living alone who was 65 years of age or older. The average household size was 2.40 and the average family size was 2.93.

In the CDP, the population was spread out, with 25.8% under the age of 18, 8.3% from 18 to 24, 28.7% from 25 to 44, 24.9% from 45 to 64, and 12.3% who were 65 years of age or older. The median age was 37 years. For every 100 females, there were 93.0 males. For every 100 females age 18 and over, there were 86.1 males.

The median income for a household in the CDP was $27,771, and the median income for a family was $32,237. Males had a median income of $26,445 versus $19,375 for females. The per capita income for the CDP was $11,409. About 16.8% of families and 25.1% of the population were below the poverty line, including 32.7% of those under age 18 and 28.9% of those age 65 or over.
