= Pleasant Hill, Northampton County, North Carolina =

Pleasant Hill, North Carolina
- Unincorporated community
- Nickname: =
- Location of Pleasant Hill in North Carolina Pleasant Hill, North Carolina (the United States)
- Coordinates: 36°31′56″N 77°32′08″W
- Country: United States
- State: North Carolina
- County: Northampton
- Elevation: 125 ft (38 m)
- Time zone: UTC-5 (Eastern (EST))
  - Summer (DST): UTC-4 (EDT)
- ZIP code: 27866
- Area code: 252
- FIPS code: 37-37131
- GNIS feature ID: 992510

Pleasant Hill is an unincorporated community in northwestern Northampton County, North Carolina, United States. The community is on U.S. Route 301, north of Weldon, and lies at an elevation of 125 feet (38 m).

The people of the area were free blacks who married into the Haliwa Saponis, creating a distinctive Native American tribe, which now has 4000 surviving members. The majority of Haliwa Saponis live in the Halifax County area of North Carolina. In Pleasant Hill, the Broady family members tied to Chief Mountain are the only Haliwa Saponis in the Pleasant Hill area. In 1848, Pleasant Hill was a stop on the Petersburg Railroad, and is part of the Roanoke Rapids, North Carolina Micropolitan Statistical Area.

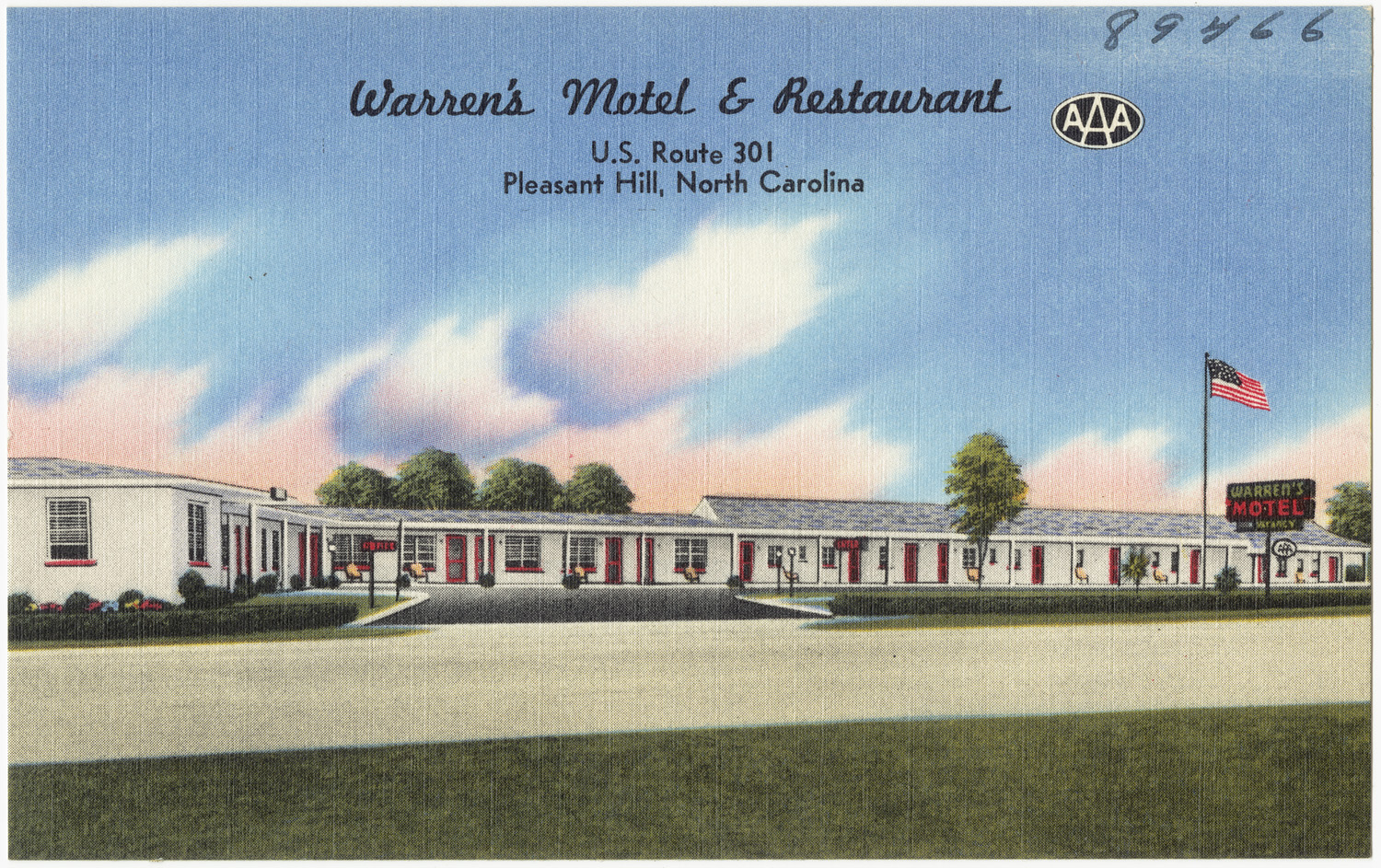
Warren's Motel & Restaurant, U.S. Route 301, Pleasant Hill, North Carolina
