= Severn, North Carolina =

- Town
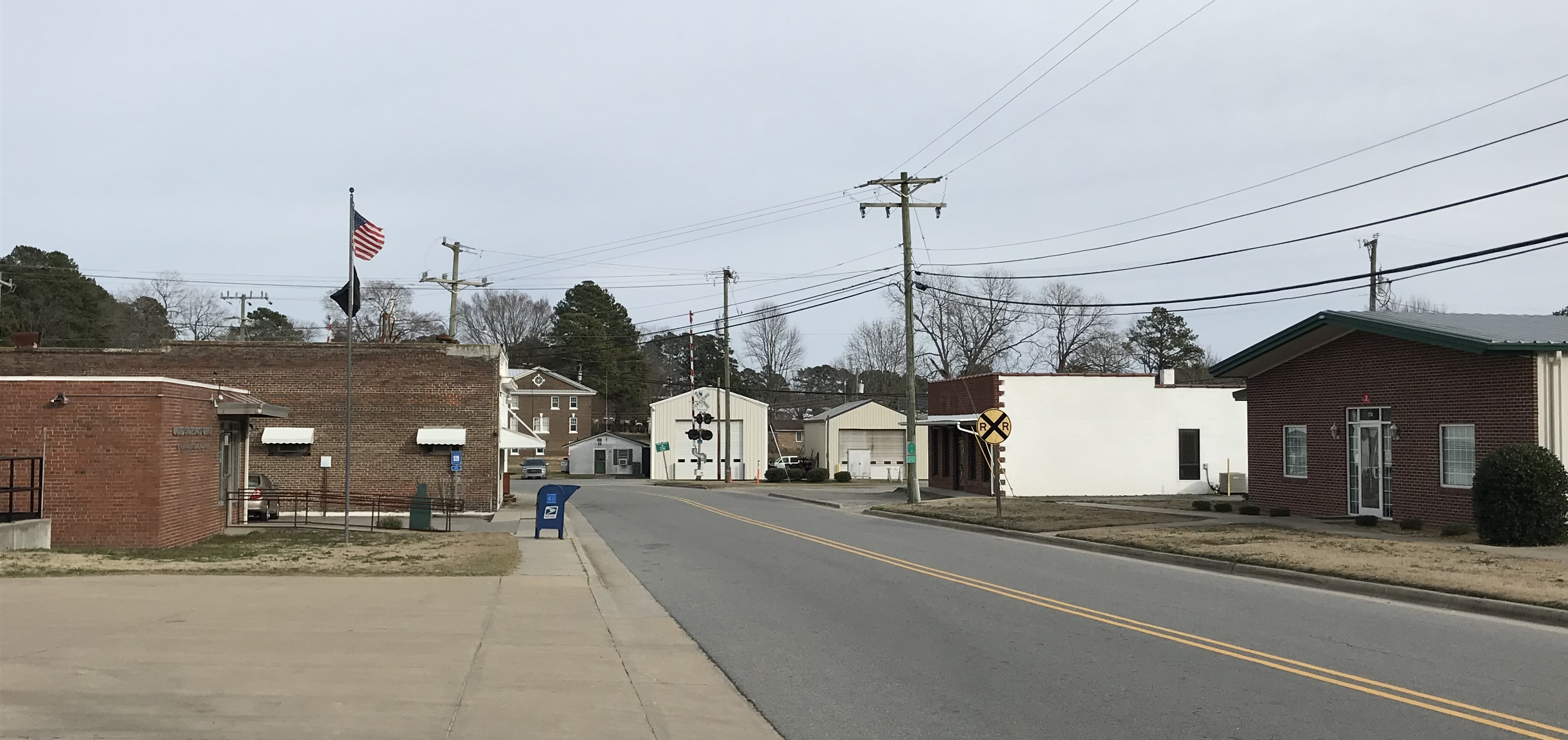
- Main Street

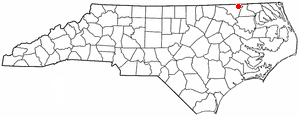
- Location of Severn, North Carolina
- Coordinates: 36°30′51″N 77°11′21″W
- Country: United States
- State: North Carolina
- County: Northampton

Area
  - Total: 1.01 sq mi (2.62 km^{2})
  - Land: 1.01 sq mi (2.62 km^{2})
  - Water: 0 sq mi (0.00 km^{2})
- Elevation: 56 ft (17 m)

Population (2020)
  - Total: 191
  - Density: 188.9/sq mi (72.94/km^{2})
- Time zone: UTC-5 (Eastern (EST))
  - Summer (DST): UTC-4 (EDT)
- ZIP code: 27877
- Area code: 252
- FIPS code: 37-60560
- GNIS feature ID: 2407315

Severn is a town in Northampton County, North Carolina, United States. As of the 2020 census, Severn had a population of 191. It is part of the Roanoke Rapids, North Carolina Micropolitan Statistical Area. Severn is the home of Severn Peanut Corporation, the owners of the Hampton Farms brand of roasted peanuts.

== History ==
The community was settled in about 1833 and named Meherrin after a local Native American tribe. In 1887 a branch rail line was built through Meherrin. It was incorporated in 1919 and named for Severn Ayers, a stockholder of the Seaboard Airline Railroad.

== Geography ==
According to the United States Census Bureau, the town has a total area of 1.0 square mile (2.6 km^{2}), all land.

== Demographics ==
Historical population
Census	Pop.	Note	%±
1920	284		—
1930	354		24.6%
1940	323		−8.8%
1950	340		5.3%
1960	310		−8.8%
1970	356		14.8%
1980	309		−13.2%
1990	260		−15.9%
2000	263		1.2%
2010	276		4.9%
2020	191		−30.8%
U.S. Decennial Census

As of the census of 2000, there were 263 people, 103 households, and 70 families residing in the town. The population density was 261.1 inhabitants per square mile (100.8/km^{2}). There were 117 housing units at an average density of 116.2 per square mile (44.9/km^{2}). The racial makeup of the town was 59.32% White, 35.74% African American, 1.90% Native American, 2.28% from other races, and 0.76% from two or more races. Hispanic or Latino of any race were 2.28% of the population.

There were 103 households, out of which 20.4% had children under the age of 18 living with them, 51.5% were married couples living together, 13.6% had a female householder with no husband present, and 32.0% were non-families. 30.1% of all households were made up of individuals, and 16.5% had someone living alone who was 65 years of age or older. The average household size was 2.55 and the average family size was 3.19.

In the town, the population was spread out, with 20.9% under the age of 18, 6.8% from 18 to 24, 27.8% from 25 to 44, 24.7% from 45 to 64, and 19.8% who were 65 years of age or older. The median age was 41 years. For every 100 females, there were 92.0 males. For every 100 females age 18 and over, there were 98.1 males.

The median income for a household in the town was $32,969, and the median income for a family was $41,458. Males had a median income of $26,607 versus $15,000 for females. The per capita income for the town was $16,227. About 11.6% of families and 13.5% of the population were below the poverty line, including 4.3% of those under the age of eighteen and 30.0% of those 65 or over.

== Works cited ==
- Footprints in Northampton : 1741-1776-1976. Rich Square: Northampton County Bicentennial Committee. 1976.
- Powell, William S. (1976). The North Carolina Gazetteer: A Dictionary of Tar Heel Places. Chapel Hill: The University of North Carolina Press. ISBN 9780807812471.
