= Roanoke Rapids Historic District =

Historic district in North Carolina, United States

- U.S. National Register of Historic Places
- U.S. Historic district
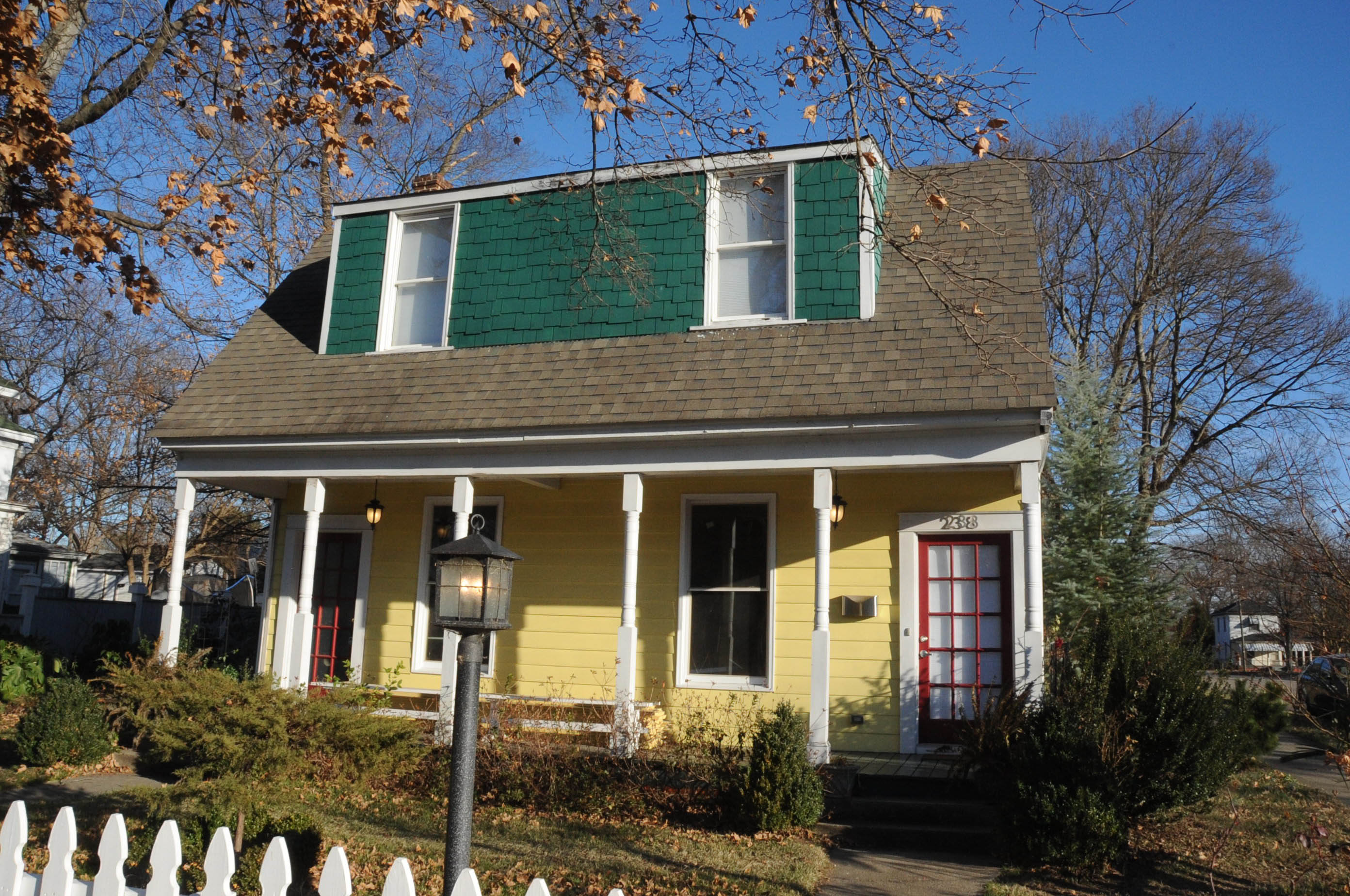
- Turtleback House

- Location within North Carolina Location within the United States
- Location: Roughly bounded by Roanoke R.; Charlotte, Marshall, and Jefferson Sts.; CSX RR; and W. Thirteenth, Rapids, and Henry Sts, Roanoke, North Carolina
- Coordinates: 36°27′38″N 77°39′23″W
- Area: 0 acres (0 ha)
- Architect: Aladdin Company; Upjohn, Hobart, et al.
- Architectural style: Queen Anne, Bungalow/craftsman, Colonial Revival
- NRHP reference No.: 98001574
- Added to NRHP: April 27, 1999

Roanoke Rapids Historic District is a national historic district located at Roanoke Rapids, Halifax County, North Carolina. It encompasses 1,130 contributing buildings, 5 contributing sites, 27 contributing structures, and 1 contributing structure in the central business district and surrounding residential sections of the town of Roanoke Rapids. The district includes notable examples of Queen Anne, Colonial Revival, and Bungalow / American Craftsman style architecture. Located in the district is the separately listed Roanoke Rapids High School. Other notable buildings include workers houses in four local mill villages, Driscoll-Piland-Webb House (c. 1897), Dickens-Webb House (1906-1907), Samuel F. Patterson (1914-1915), Council-Coburn House (1925-1927), First Presbyterian Church (1915), All Saints Episcopal Church designed by Hobart Upjohn (1917), (former) First Baptist Church (1928-1929), (former) Nurses Home and School (1930-1931), Clara Hearne Elementary School (1933-1935), (former) North Carolina National Guard Armory (1940-1941), (former) United States Post Office (1937-1938), Rosemary Drug Co. Building (1915-1916), Shelton Hotel (c. 1915), First National Bank Building (1914-1915), J. C. Penney and Co. Building (1938-1942), McCrory Co. Building (1940), Imperial Theatre Building (1919, 1931), (former) Seaboard Air Line Passenger Station (1917), Rosemary Manufacturing Company complex, Patterson Mills Co. (1910), and Roanoke Mills Co. Plant No. 2. (1916-1917).

It was listed on the National Register of Historic Places in 1999.

== Carolina Trailways Bus Station ==
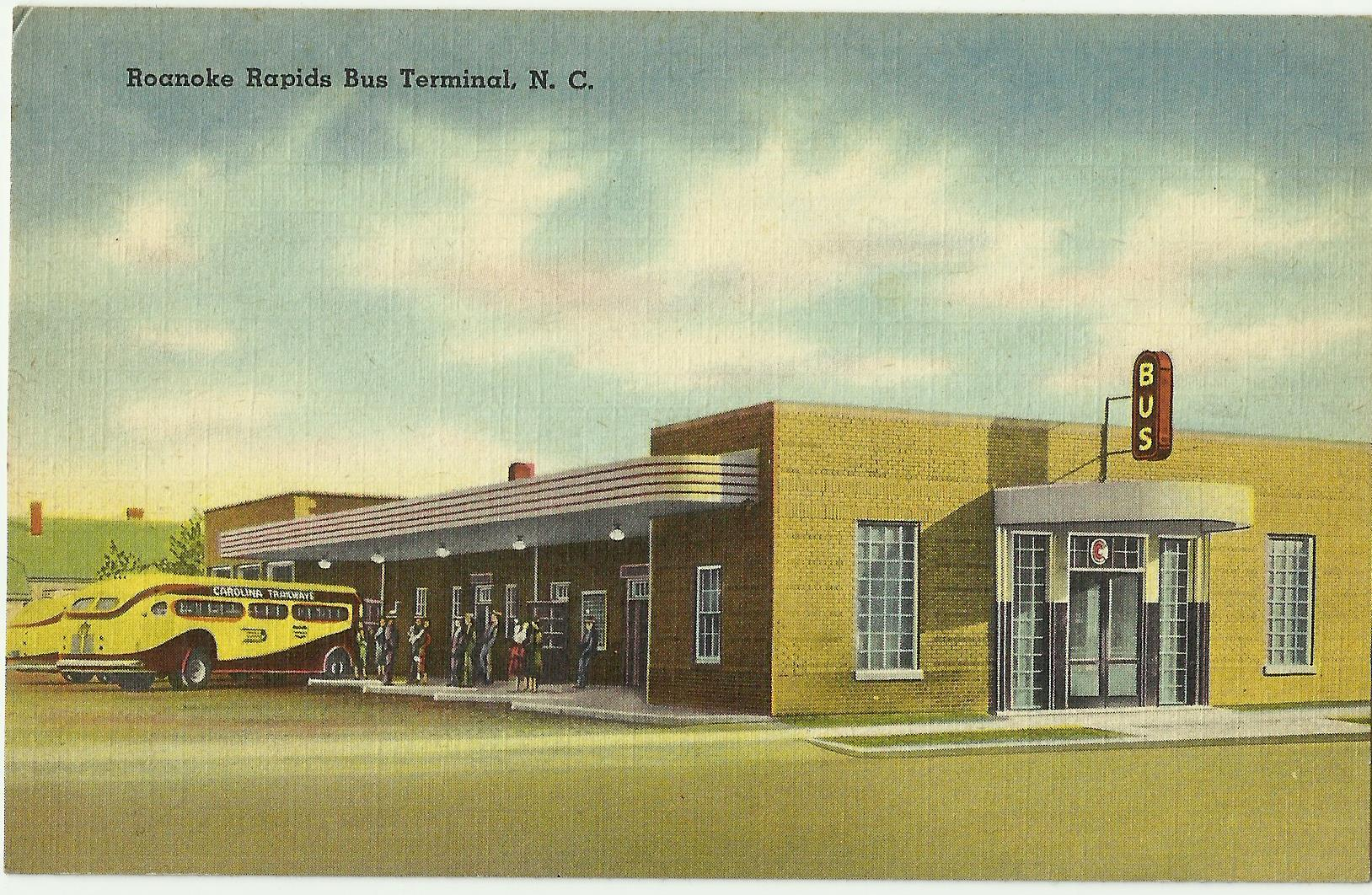
Roanoke Rapids bus terminal, erected in 1941 at 1114 Roanoke Ave, is shown with a Carolina Trailways bus, in a postcard from the North Carolina State Archives. 36.453904°N 77.658158°W

The former Carolina Trailways Bus Terminal, located at 1114 Roanoke Avenue, was the site of the event that lead to the United States Supreme Court case of Keys v. Carolina Coach Co..

Shortly after midnight on August 1, 1952, when the Carolina Trailways bus she was riding on pulled in, an African American woman, Sarah Keys, was forced to give up her seat and move to the so-called "colored section" in the back of the bus. Keys refused and was arrested, charged, jailed overnight in Roanoke Rapids, and fined $25 for disorderly conduct. Keys v. Carolina Coach made legal history both at the time of its issuance in 1955, and again in 1961, when Attorney General Robert F. Kennedy invoked it in his successful battle to end Jim Crow travel during the Freedom Riders' campaign.

The Streamline Moderne-style building was constructed in 1941 and operated as a bus station until the 1970s. It was listed in 1998 as Contributing Property 965 in the creation of the surrounding historic district.
