= Roanoke Rapids High School =

Historic school building in North Carolina, United States

Location
- 800 Hamilton Street; Roanoke Rapids, North Carolina 27870; United States

Information
- Type: Public
- Established: 1921 (105 years ago)
- School district: Roanoke Rapids Graded School District
- CEEB code: 343315
- Principal: Tom Davis
- Staff: 49.00 (FTE)
- Enrollment: 819 (2023-2024)
- Student to teacher ratio: 16.71
- Colors: Black and yellow
- Mascot: Yellow Jacket
- Website: rrgsd.org/o/rrhs
- Roanoke Rapids Junior-Senior High School
- U.S. National Register of Historic Places
- Location within North Carolina Location within the United States
- Location: 800 Hamilton St., Roanoke Rapids, North Carolina
- Coordinates: 36°27′32″N 77°39′15″W
- Area: 1.6 acres (0.65 ha)
- Built: 1921
- Architect: Upjohn, Hobart Brown; Et al.
- Architectural style: Tudor Revival
- NRHP reference No.: 88003081
- Added to NRHP: December 29, 1988

Roanoke Rapids High School is a public high school in Roanoke Rapids, North Carolina.

== Building history ==
Roanoke Rapids High School opened in 1921. It was the brainchild of local industrialist Samuel Paterson and was intended to be the centerpiece of the entire Roanoke Rapids community. The school was designed by Hobart Upjohn and cost ten times the average high school building in the state. It is in the Tudor Revival or Gothic style and draws qualities of the Universities of Cambridge and Oxford in the United Kingdom. It is a 3 1/2-story, nine-bay, T-shaped building with a combination flat-top and slate gable roof and a projecting, crenellated entrance tower. It was listed on the National Register of Historic Places in 1988.

== Athletics ==
The school's colors are black and gold. Its mascot is Jax the Yellow Jacket. The school uses a logo similar to Georgia Tech. In 1932 and 1935, the Yellow Jackets were the Class B, Baseball State Champions . Roanoke Rapids High School competes in the NCHSAA in the 4A class. There are many sports available for students.

Sports at RRHS include:

=== Fall Sports ===
- Cross country
- Football
- Girls' Golf
- Boys' Soccer
- Girls' Tennis
- Volleyball
- Flag Football

=== Winter Sports ===
- Basketball
- Cheerleading
- Swimming
- Wrestling

=== Spring Sports ===
- Baseball
- Boys' golf
- Boys' soccer
- Softball
- Tennis
- Track And Field

The school maintains an active Athletic Hall of Fame, which honors student-athletes and coaches who have contributed to the legacy of the Yellow Jackets since the early 20th century.

== Notable alumni ==
- Brian Barnes, MLB pitcher
- Nazair Jones, NFL defensive tackle
- Meredith Kinleigh, Christian pop musician
- Kareem Martin, NFL defensive end
- Tom Topping, college football player and All-American selection while at Duke, member of Duke Sports Hall of Fame
