= Sarah Louise Keys =

American civil rights activist (1928–2023)

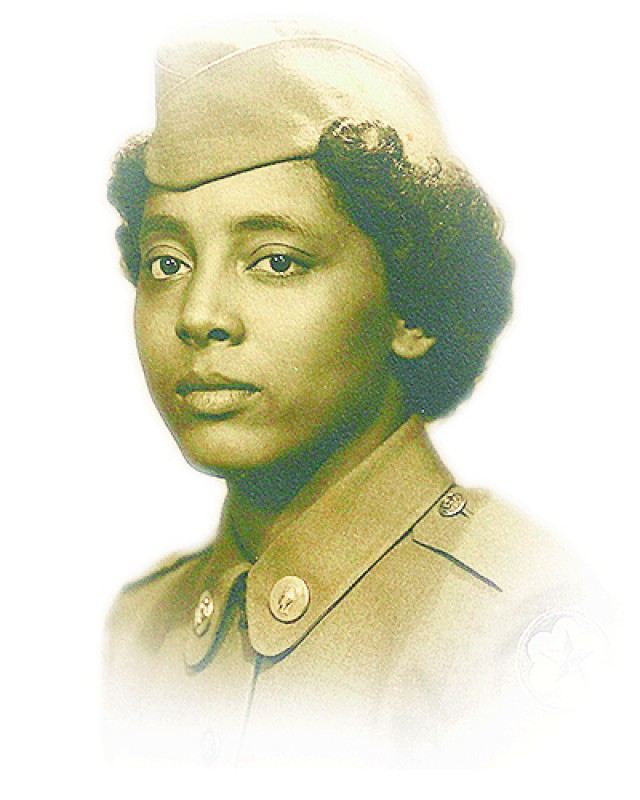
- US Army Photo of PFC Sarah Louise Keys in 1952
- Born: 1928; Washington, North Carolina
- Died: November 16, 2023 (aged 94–95)
- Citizenship: American
- Known for: Keys v. Carolina Coach Co.
- Military career
- Allegiance: United States
- Branch: Women's Army Corps

Sarah Keys Evans (born Sarah Louise Keys; 1928 – November 16, 2023) was an African American Army veteran who was a major figure in the civil rights movement in the United States.

== Biography ==
Sarah Louise Keys was born in 1928 and was a native of Washington, North Carolina. She was the daughter of David Keys, a Navy veteran of World War I and a convert to Catholicism. Keys enlisted in the Women's Army Corps in 1951. She completed her training at Fort McClellan, Alabama, and was stationed at Fort Dix in New Jersey.

As a Private First Class on August 1, 1952, Keys traveled from Fort Dix to her family's home in North Carolina. When the bus stopped to change drivers, the new bus driver demanded that Keys relinquish her seat to a white Marine. Keys, feeling tired, declined. She was arrested and spent 13 hours alone in a jail cell in Roanoke Rapids, North Carolina. She was then ordered to pay a $25 fine for disorderly conduct.

Keys was represented by attorney Julius W. Robertson in Keys v. Carolina Coach Co. During that time, Keys had been assigned to Fort Knox, Kentucky. and was discharged in 1953. The case was finally resolved in Keys' favor in 1955 by the Interstate Commerce Commission. Keys was working at a beauty salon in Brooklyn when the news broke. She had tried to keep her case a secret, but her photo soon appeared in the newspapers. Later that year, Rosa Parks was arrested for refusing to yield her seat to a white passenger.

== Personal life and death ==
In 1958, Sarah Keys married George Evans. Keys was a member of Our Lady of Victory Catholic Church in Brooklyn, New York.

Keys died on November 16, 2023, at the age of 95.

== Legacy ==
2020 video by the U.S. Army

Keys was invited to speak at the 1997 Dedication of the Women in Military Service for America Memorial. In 2020, Roanoke Rapids declared August 1 to be "Sarah Keys Evans Day," and dedicated a mural depicting her story.

The 117th United States Congress considered a bill to award Keys with the Congressional Gold Medal.
