= Keys v. Carolina Coach Co. =

Landmark 1955 US civil rights case

Sarah Keys v. Carolina Coach Company, 64 MCC 769 (1955) is a landmark civil rights case in the United States in which the Interstate Commerce Commission, in response to a bus segregation complaint filed in 1953 by a Women's Army Corps (WAC) private named Sarah Louise Keys, broke with its historic adherence to the Plessy v. Ferguson separate but equal doctrine and interpreted the non-discrimination language of the Interstate Commerce Act of 1887 as banning the segregation of black passengers in buses traveling across state lines.

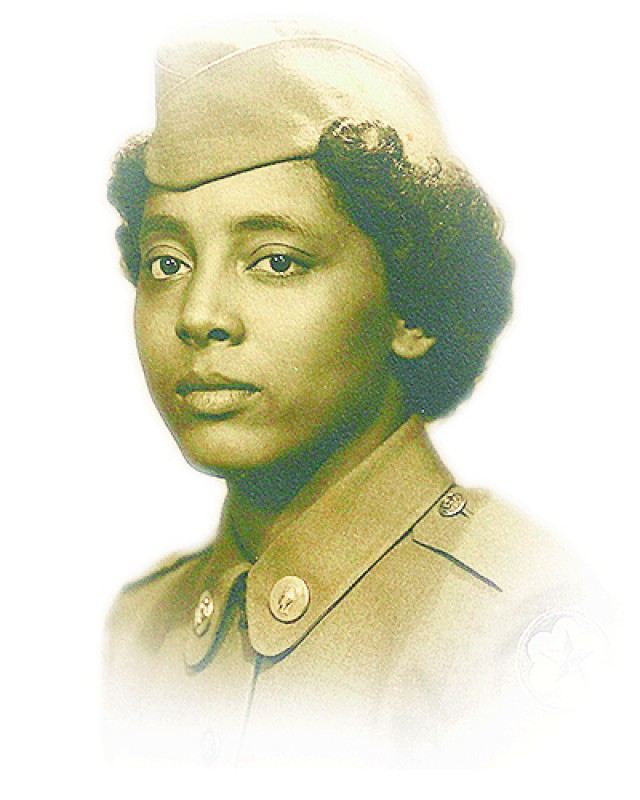
United States Army Photo of PFC Sarah Louise Keys

The case was filed on the eve of the explosion of the Civil Rights Movement by Washington, D.C., lawyer Julius Winfield Robertson and his partner, Dovey Johnson Roundtree, a former WAC whose experience with Jim Crow bus travel during her World War II Army recruiting days caused her to take on the case as a personal mission. Keys v. Carolina Coach Company, along with its companion train desegregation case, NAACP v. St. Louis-San Francisco Railway Company, represents a milestone in the legal battle for civil rights. The November 1955 ruling, publicly announced six days before Rosa Parks' historic defiance of state Jim Crow laws on Montgomery buses, applied the United States Supreme Court's logic in Brown v. Board of Education for the first time to the field of interstate transportation, and closed the legal loophole that private bus companies had long exploited to impose their own Jim Crow regulations on black interstate travelers. Keys v. Carolina Coach was the only explicit rejection ever made by either a court or a federal administrative body of the Plessy v. Ferguson doctrine in the field of bus travel across state lines. The ruling made legal history both at the time of its issuance and again in 1961, when Attorney General Robert F. Kennedy invoked it in his successful battle to end Jim Crow travel during the Freedom Riders' campaign.

== Background ==
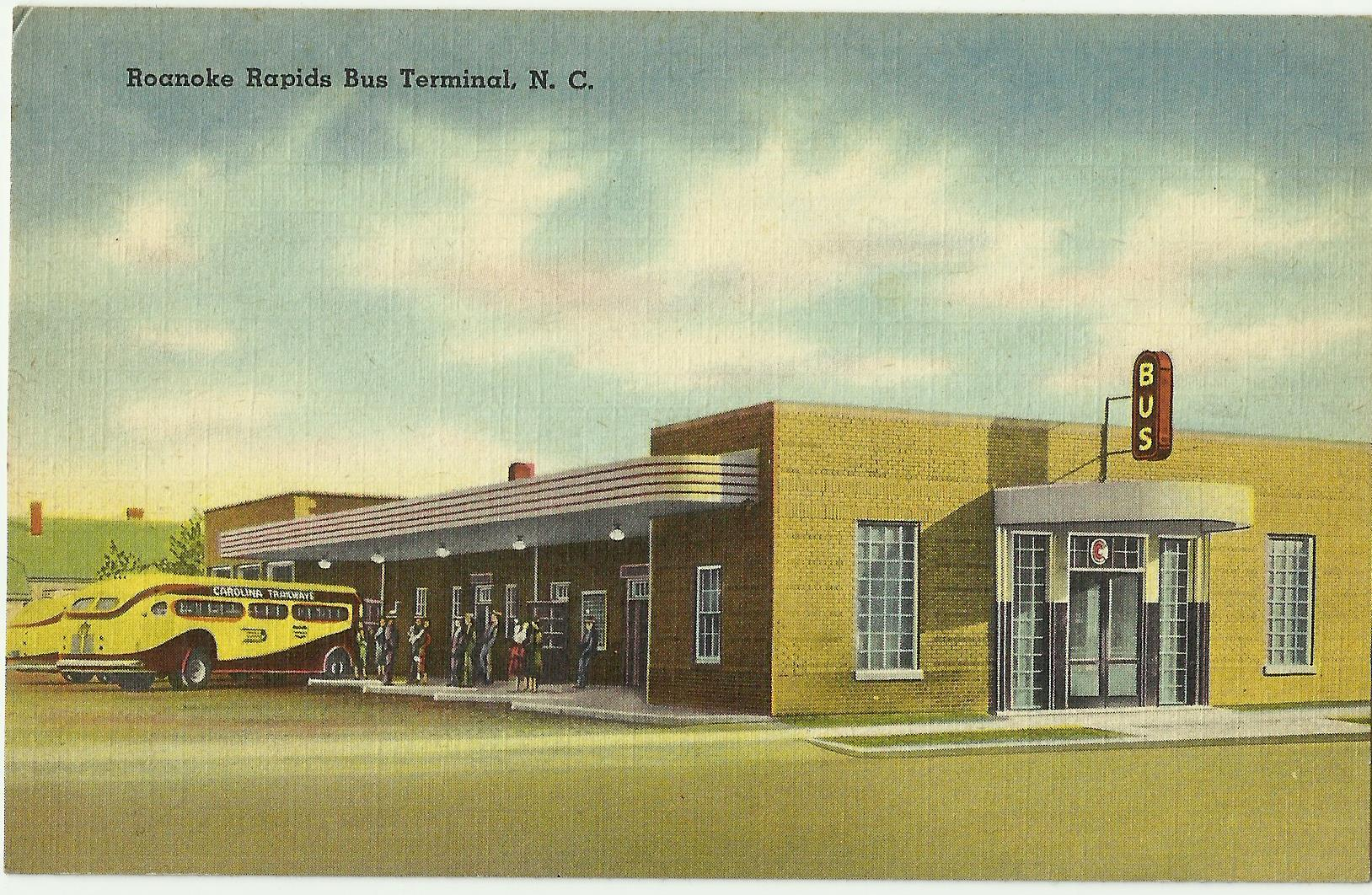
Roanoke Rapids Trailways Station, shown with a Carolina Trailways bus, in a postcard from the North Carolina State Archives

The Keys case originated in an incident that occurred at a bus station in the North Carolina town of Roanoke Rapids shortly after midnight on August 1, 1952, when African American WAC private Sarah Keys was forced by a local bus driver to yield her seat in the front of the vehicle to a white Marine as she traveled homeward on furlough. At the time of the incident, Jim Crow laws entirely governed Southern bus travel, despite a 1946 Supreme Court ruling meant to put an end to the practice. That decision, Morgan v. Virginia, had declared state Jim Crow laws inoperative on interstate buses on the basis that the imposition of widely varying statutes on black passengers moving across state lines generated multiple seat changes and thus created the kind of disorder and inconsistency forbidden by the Commerce Clause of the U.S. Constitution. Southern carriers managed to dodge the Morgan decision, however, by passing segregation rules of their own, and those rules remained outside the purview of state and federal courts because they pertained to private businesses. In addition, the federal agency charged with regulating the carriers, the Interstate Commerce Commission, had historically interpreted the Interstate Commerce Act's discrimination ban as permitting separate accommodations for the races so long as they were equal. The ICC's separate but equal policy, upheld by the Supreme Court of the United States in a 1950 railway dining car segregation case known as Henderson v. United States, thus remained the norm in public transportation.

When Sarah Keys departed her WAC post in Fort Dix, New Jersey on the evening of July 31, 1952 bound for her hometown of Washington, North Carolina, she boarded an integrated bus in New Jersey and transferred without incident in Washington, D.C. to a Carolina Trailways vehicle, taking the fifth seat from the front in the white section. When her bus pulled into the Roanoke Rapids Trailways terminal, a new driver took the wheel and demanded that she comply with the carrier's Jim Crow regulation by moving to the so-called "colored section" in the back of the bus so that a white Marine could occupy her seat. Keys refused to move, whereupon the driver emptied the bus, directed the other passengers to another vehicle, and barred Keys from boarding it. An altercation ensued and Keys was arrested, charged with disorderly conduct, jailed incommunicado overnight, then convicted of the disorderly conduct charge and fined $25.

Unwilling to accept the verdict of the North Carolina lower court sustaining the charge, Keys and her father brought the matter to the attention of the National Association for the Advancement of Colored People (NAACP) office in Washington, D.C., headed by Howard University Law School professor Frank D. Reeves. Reeves referred Keys' case to his former law student Dovey Johnson Roundtree, whose World War II service in the Women's Army Corps (WAC) he believed would make her an ideal advocate for Sarah Keys. Roundtree herself, as a recruiter for the WAC in the Deep South, had been evicted from a Miami, Florida bus in a 1943 incident that almost exactly paralleled Sarah Keys' experience. She and her law partner and mentor Julius Winfield Robertson undertook the case, filing a complaint against both the Northern carrier which had transported Keys to Washington, D.C., and the Southern carrier which had actually perpetrated the alleged wrong, Carolina Trailways. Though Robertson and Roundtree were but a year at the bar in the fall of 1952 when they undertook to represent Sarah Keys, they had been trained at Howard University Law School by such renowned civil rights lawyers as Thurgood Marshall, James Nabrit Jr., and George E.C. Hayes, and they were deeply involved in the movement to dismantle segregation in the courts. Writing years later in her autobiography about the unique bond she had with her client, Dovey Roundtree said, "It was as though I sat looking in a mirror, so strong was my sense of having walked where Sarah Keys had walked."

== Three-year battle ==
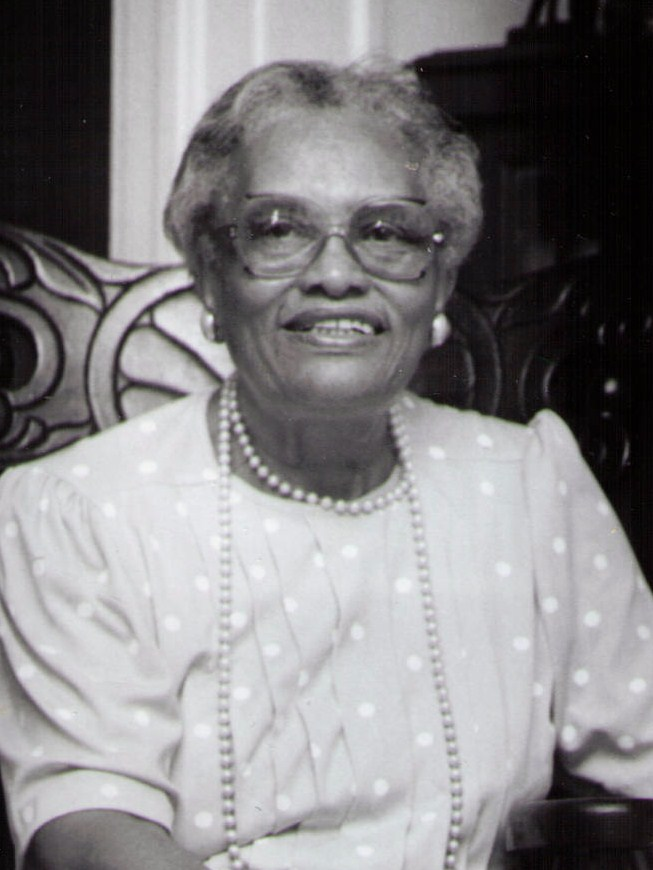
Keys' co-counsel Dovey Johnson Roundtree (1994 photo)

The match of client Sarah Keys with the young firm of Robertson and Roundtree proved fortuitous, as did the timing of the case, which unfolded during the same two-year period that the Supreme Court of the United States was hearing oral arguments in the landmark school desegregation case, Brown v. Board of Education. When the US District Court for the District of Columbia dismissed the Keys complaint on February 23, 1953, on jurisdictional grounds, Roundtree and Robertson elected to bring their case before the Interstate Commerce Commission, which they believed might be persuaded to re-evaluate its traditional interpretation of the Interstate Commerce Act, in the same way that the Supreme Court was then re-evaluating its interpretation of the Fourteenth Amendment. On September 1, 1953, two months before Thurgood Marshall and his legal team made the second round of oral arguments in Brown before the Supreme Court asserting that the Fourteenth Amendment's "equal protection" clause prohibited segregation, Sarah Keys became the first black petitioner to bring a complaint before the Commission on a Jim Crow bus matter.

When the Supreme Court handed down its epochal ruling on May 17, 1954, in Brown v. Board of Education, the ICC initially chose to ignore it. In a September 30, 1954 ruling, ICC hearing examiner Isadore Freidson stated that Brown had no relevance to the conduct of business by a private bus carrier. Citing Plessy v. Ferguson as well as several 19th-century ICC decisions handed down prior to Plessy, and others which the Supreme Court had later overturned, Freidson argued that the non-discrimination language of the Interstate Commerce Act of 1887 did not prohibit segregation. Roundtree, through a Spelman classmate who lived in Sarah Keys' Congressional district, contacted Congressman Adam Clayton Powell to protest Freidson's ruling and demand a re-hearing by the full 11-man Commission. Following Powell's intervention, the re-hearing was granted, and Roundtree and Robertson were given 30 days to file exceptions. In those exceptions, the lawyers invoked both the Commerce Clause of the US Constitution and the Supreme Court's reasoning in Brown and applied it explicitly to the area of transportation.

On November 7, 1955, in a historic ruling, the Commission condemned 'separate but equal' in the field where it had begun—public transportation. In the Keys case, and in the NAACP's companion train case attacking segregation on railroads and in terminal waiting rooms, NAACP v. St. Louis-Santa Fe Railway Company, the ICC ruled that the Interstate Commerce Act prohibited segregation itself. The Keys decision, made public just one week before Rosa Parks' defiance of the bus segregation laws of the city of Montgomery, banned segregation itself as an assault upon the personhood of black travelers, and held in part:

"We conclude that the assignment of seats on interstate buses, so designated as to imply the inherent inferiority of a traveler solely because of race or color, must be regarded as subjecting the traveler to unjust discrimination, and undue and unreasonable prejudice and disadvantage...We find that the practice of defendant requiring that Negro interstate passengers occupy space or seats in specified portions of its buses, subjects such passengers to unjust discrimination, and undue and unreasonable prejudice and disadvantage, in violation of Section 216 (d) of the Interstate Commerce Act and is therefore unlawful."

== Enforcement ==
Hailed by the press as a "symbol of a movement that cannot be held back," the Keys case marked a turning point in the legal battle against segregation, and a major departure from the ICC's history in racial matters. However, in the short term it lay dormant, its intent thwarted by the one ICC commissioner who had dissented from the majority opinion, South Carolina Democrat J. Monroe Johnson. In his position as chairman of the commission, Johnson consistently failed to enforce the Keys ruling, and it was not until the summer of 1961, when the violence resulting from the Freedom Riders' campaign prompted Attorney General Robert F. Kennedy to take action, that the impact of the Keys case was felt.

Impelled by the protests of civil rights leaders and the weight of international outrage at the brutality perpetrated on the Freedom Riders Kennedy took the unusual legal step of issuing a petition to the Interstate Commerce Commission on May 29, 1961, in which he called upon them to implement their own rulings. Citing the Keys and NAACP train case, along with the Supreme Court's 1960 Boynton v. Virginia ruling prohibiting segregation in terminal waiting rooms, restaurants and restrooms, the Attorney General called upon the ICC to issue specific regulations banning Jim Crow in interstate travel, and to take immediate steps to enforce those regulations.

== Historical perspective ==
A major breakthrough in the legal battle for civil rights, Keys v. Carolina Coach Company has generally been eclipsed in historical accounts of the movement by the events which followed it, notably the defiance of Montgomery, Alabama's city bus laws by Rosa Parks and the resultant Montgomery bus boycott. Parks' action assumed an importance far beyond the level of a municipal incident, giving rise to a Supreme Court decision banning segregation in travel within the individual states (Browder v. Gayle, 352 U.S. 903 (1956)) and igniting the civil rights campaign which thrust the Rev. Martin Luther King Jr. onto the national stage and paved the way for further reforms. The protest movement King led created an environment in which Keys and other desegregation rulings could be implemented. For this reason, Keys represents one critical piece in the complex and multi-faceted fight for civil rights, in which the legal and the activist streams sustained each other and in combination precipitated the dismantling of Jim Crow.

== Source materials ==
- "Balky Dixie Keeps Jim Crow in States," The New York Post, November 27, 1955.
- Barnes, Catherine A. (1983). Journey from Jim Crow: The Desegregation of Southern Transit. New York: Columbia University Press. Ch. 1–9. ISBN 9780231053808.
- Brantley, Alice. "A Definite and Imperative Need for Legislation Against Discrimination," Amending Interstate Commerce Act (Segregation of Passengers) Hearings before the Committee on Interstate and Foreign Commerce, United States House of Representatives, 83rd Congress, 2nd Session, May 12–14, 1954, Washington, DC.
- Bellafaire, Judith. "Challenging the System: Two Army Women Fight for Equality". Women In Military Service For America Memorial Foundation. Archived from the original on January 25, 2009.
- Salvatore, Susan Cianci; et al. (2004) [Revised 2009]. "Survey Results – Properties Removed from Further Study". Civil Rights in America: Racial Desegregation in Public Accommodations (A National Historic Landmarks Theme Study). National Park Service, U.S. Department of the Interior. p. 142.
- Discrimination in Operation of Interstate Motor Carriers of Passengers, 86 MCC 743 (1961).
- Dixon, Robert G. Jr. (1962–1963). "Civil Rights in Transportation and the ICC". George Washington Law Review. 31: 211–213.
- Escobar, Gabriel. "Saluting Military Pioneers, Past and Present," Washington Post, December 8, 1997.
- Exceptions to Proposed Report and Order," Robertson and Roundtree to the Interstate Commerce Commission in Sarah Keys v. Carolina Coach Company, Docket No. MC-C-1564, in Dept. of Justice Antitrust Division, DOJ File 144-54-56.
- "Excerpts from Bus Petition to ICC," New York Times, May 29, 1961.
- Greenberg, Milton (1997). "Dovey Roundtree". The GI Bill: The Law that Changed America. New York: Lickle Publishing. p. 103.
- Huston, Luther A. "I.C.C. Orders End of Segregation on Trains, Buses; Deadline Jan. 10; Ruling Follows High Court Edict -- Legal Test Seen," New York Times, November 25, 1955.
- "ICC Aide Calls Travel Segregation Legal," Associated Press in the Washington Post, October 1, 1954
- "ICC Outlaws Travel Bias," The Pittsburgh Courier, December 3, 1955.
- "ICC Ruling: End of an Era," The Pittsburgh Courier, December 10, 1955.
- "ICC To Outlaw Jim Crow In Interstate Travel". Jet. Vol. VII, no. 4. Johnson Publishing. December 2, 1954. p. 3.
- "ICC Examiner's Ruling Favors Jimcrow Bias," Daily Worker, September 30, 1954, page 3.
- Lerner, Max (November 28, 1955). "We Ride Together". New York Post.
- McCabe, Katie (March 2002). "She Had a Dream". Washingtonian Magazine.
- McCabe, Katie; Roundtree, Dovey Johnson (2009). Justice Older than the Law: the Life of Dovey Johnson Roundtree. University Press of Mississippi.
- NAACP v. Saint Louis-San Francisco Railway Company, 298 ICC 335 (1955).
- Palmore, Joseph R. (November 1997). "The Not-So-Strange Career of Interstate Jim Crow: Race, Transportation, and the Dormant Commerce Clause, 1878-1946". Virginia Law Review. 83 (8): 1816. doi:10.2307/1073658. JSTOR 1073658.
- "Report and Order Recommended by Isadore Freidson, Examiner," Interstate Commerce Commission in Sarah Keys v. Carolina Coach Company, Docket No. MC-C-1564, in Dept. of Justice Antitrust Division, DOJ file 144-54-56.
- Richardson, Clem, "Like Parks, She Wouldn't Budge," New York Daily News, December 2, 2005.
- Risher, Charles A. (1992). "Keys v. Carolina Coach Company". In Lowery, Charles D.; Marszalek, John F. (eds.). Encyclopedia of African-American Civil Rights: From Emancipation to the Present. New York, NY: Greenwood Press. p. 298. Archived from the original on October 14, 2012 – via Questia.
- "Segregation: Anybody's Seats," Newsweek, December 5, 1955.
- "A Tribute to Sarah Keys Evans," Speech of Hon. Edolphus Towns (NY) in the US House of Representatives, The Congressional Record, Thursday, March 9, 2006.
- Warner, James E. "Segregation's End on Buses, Trains Ordered by the I.C.C.," The New York Herald Tribune, November 25, 1955.
- Editorial Board (December 6, 1955). "Whistling in the Dark". Baltimore Afro-American. p. 3.
- "Winner Acclaims Decision by I.C.C.; Negro Woman in Bus Case Voices Happiness Here at Segregation Ban," New York Times, November 27, 1955.
