= Hobart Upjohn =

American architect

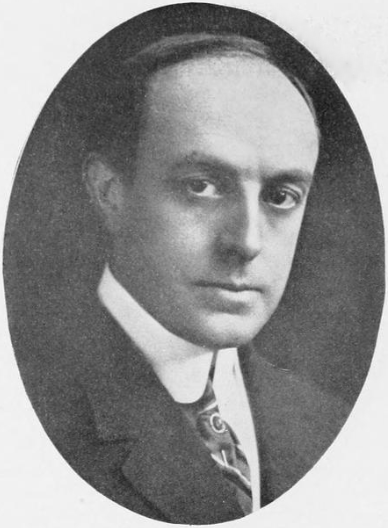
- Born: May 2, 1876; Brooklyn, New York, US
- Died: August 23, 1949 (aged 73); Poughkeepsie, New York, US
- Occupation: Architect
- Buildings: Mead Memorial Chapel; First Presbyterian Church

Hobart Brown Upjohn (1876–1949) was an American architect, best known for designing a number of ecclesiastical and educational structures in New York and in North Carolina. He also designed a number of significant private homes. His firm produced a total of about 150 projects, a third of which were in North Carolina.

== Biography ==
He was born in Brooklyn on May 2, 1876, a son of Richard M. Upjohn (1828–1903) and grandson of Richard Upjohn (1802–1878). He received a degree in mechanical engineering from Stevens Institute of Technology in 1899. He worked in his father's firm until 1903 and then opened his own practice in 1905. He entered a partnership with George W. Conable (1866–1933) in 1908. That partnership ended in 1914. One of the works produced by the partnership was the 1909 Rye Town Park-Bathing Complex and Oakland Beach, added to the National Register of Historic Places in 2003.

He closed his practice in 1945, and died in Poughkeepsie on August 23, 1949.

A number of his works are listed on the National Register of Historic Places.

== Notable works ==
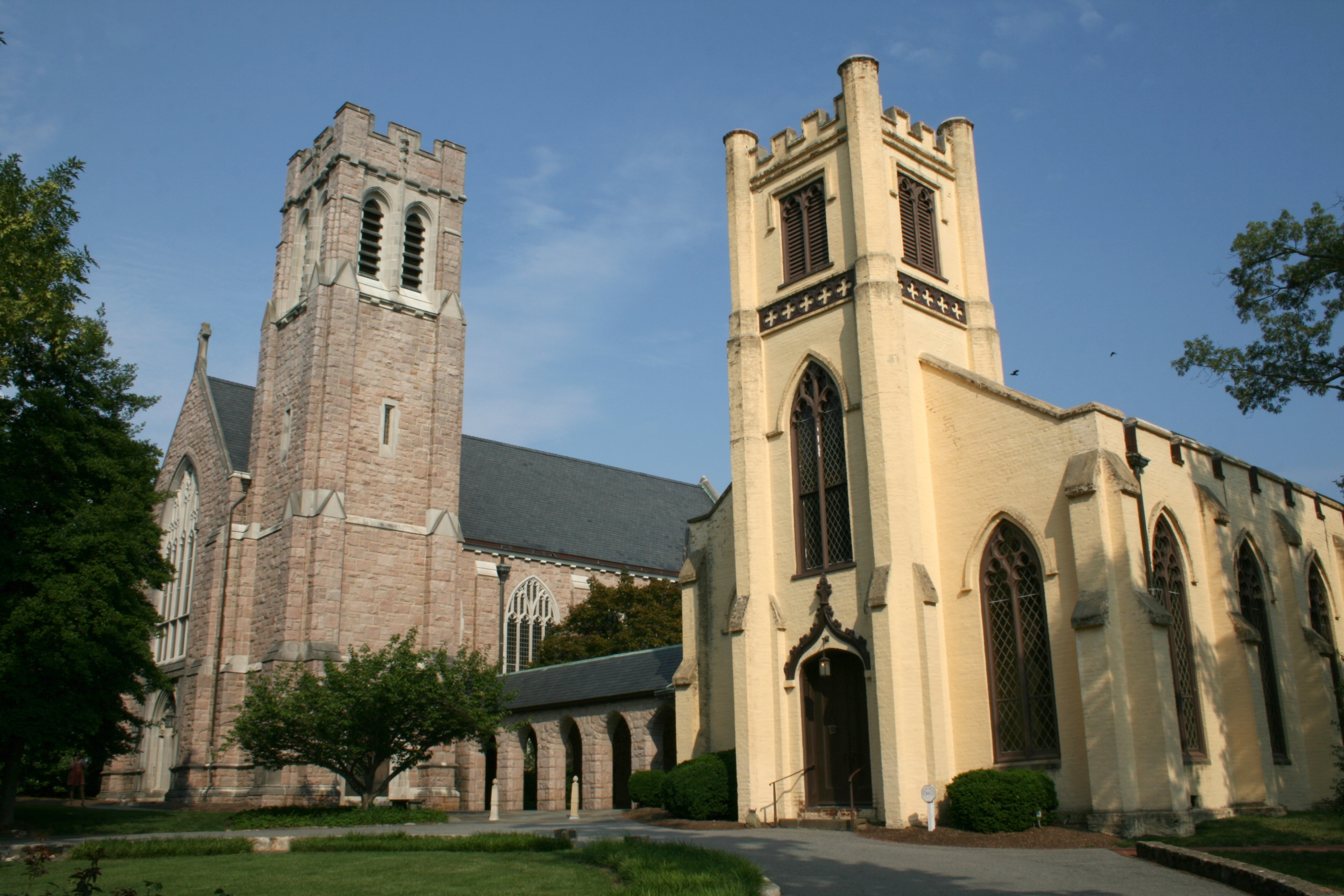
Chapel of the Cross

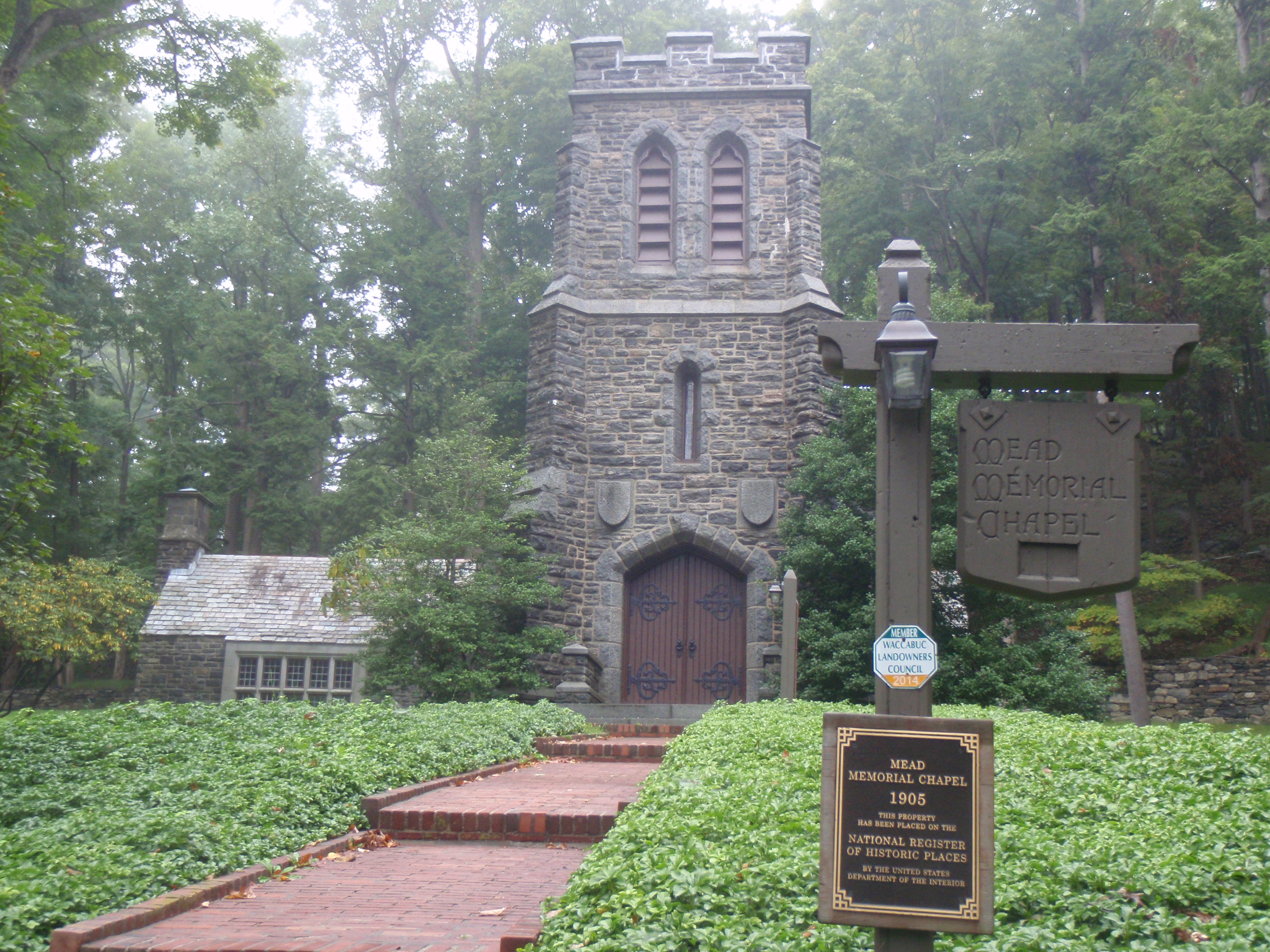
Mead Memorial Chapel

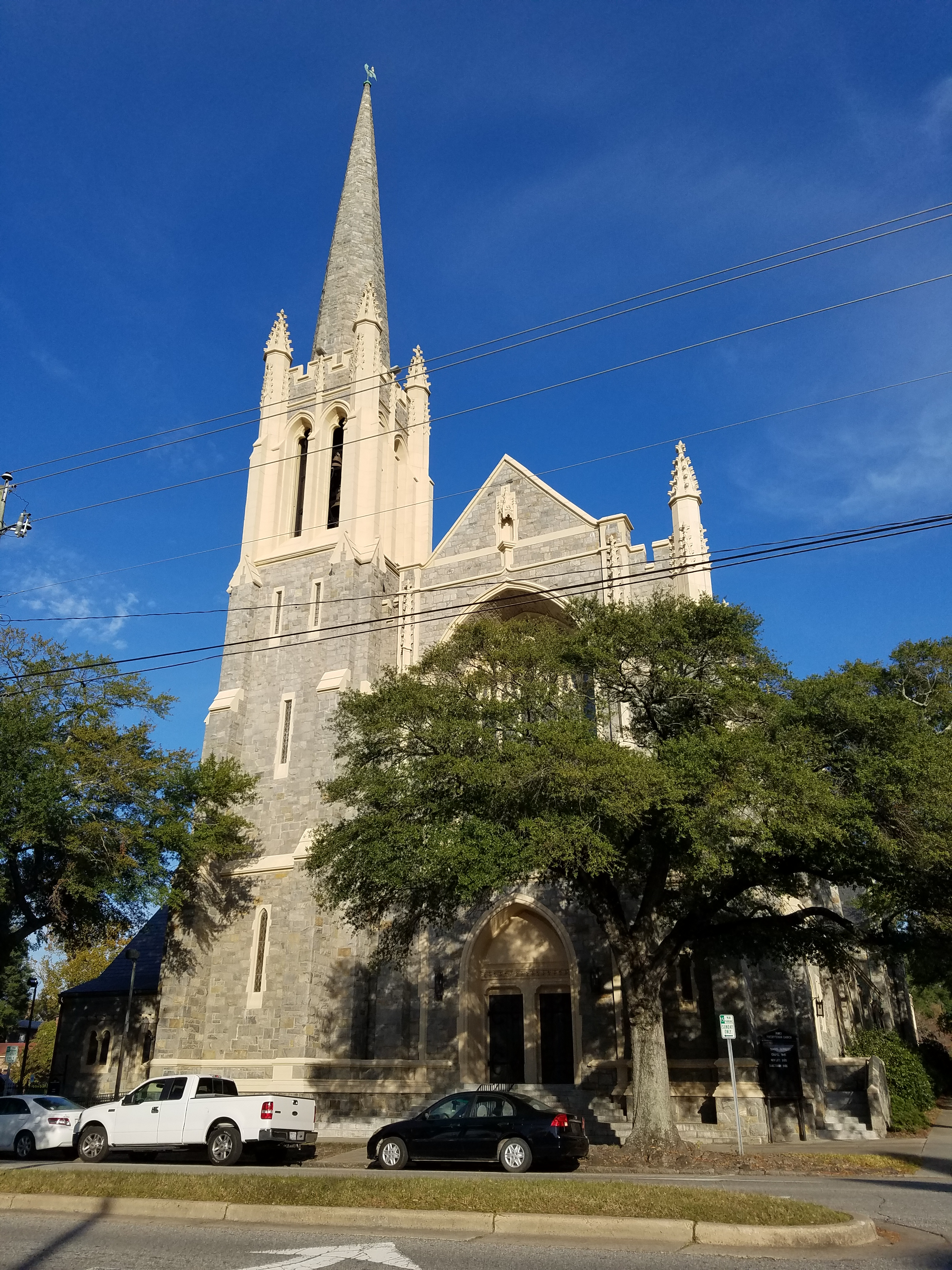
Firsty Presbyterian Church, Wilmington NC

- Chapel of the Cross (Chapel Hill, North Carolina) Church (1925), Main Tower, and Cloister
- Hobart and William Smith Colleges, Geneva, New York
- Mead Memorial Chapel
- Roanoke Rapids High School, 800 Hamilton St., Roanoke Rapids, NC (Upjohn, Hobart Brown), NRHP-listed
- St. Athanasius Episcopal Church and Parish House and the Church of the Holy Comforter, Burlington, North Carolina
- Christ Episcopal Church, Parish House & Chapel, 120 E. Edenton St., Raleigh, NC (Upjohn, Hobart), NRHP-listed
- Church of St. Joseph of Arimathea, 2172 Saw Mill River Rd., Greenburgh, NY (Upjohn, Hobart), NRHP-listed
- First Presbyterian Church, Portico, Steeple, Parish House, & Chapel, Ann and Bow Sts., Fayetteville, NC (Upjohn, Hobart), NRHP-listed
- First Presbyterian Church, 125 S. 3rd St., Wilmington, NC
- Mead Memorial Chapel, 2 Chapel Rd., Lewisboro, NY (Upjohn, Hobart B.), NRHP-listed
- All Saints Episcopal Church (1917) in the Roanoke Rapids Historic District, Roanoke Rapids, NC
- Scarsdale Woman's Club, 37 Drake Rd., Scarsdale, NY (Upjohn, Hobart), NRHP-listed
- St. Athanasius Episcopal Church and Parish House and the Church of the Holy Comforter, 300 E. Webb Ave. and 320 E. Davis St., Burlington, NC (Upjohn, Hobart), NRHP-listed
- St. Catherine's School, 6001 Grove Ave., Richmond, VA (Upjohn, Hobart), NRHP-listed
- St. Luke's Episcopal Church, 68 Bedford Rd., Katonah, New York (Upjohn, Hobart B.), NRHP-listed
- Holy Trinity Episcopal Church, original Parish House, Greensboro, North Carolina
- First Presbyterian Church of Greensboro, Greensboro, North Carolina
- Temple Emanuel, (N. Greene St., Greensboro, North Carolina)
- Unitarian Church of All Souls (1931–32), Lexington Avenue, New York City
- Grace Methodist Church (Greensboro, North Carolina)
- First Presbyterian Church (High Point, North Carolina)
- First Presbyterian Church (Concord, North Carolina)
- The Village Chapel (Pinehurst, North Carolina)
- North Carolina State University Library (now Brooks Hall) (Raleigh, North Carolina)
- North Carolina State University, Bagwell, Becton, and Berry Quadrangle (Raleigh, North Carolina)
- First Presbyterian Church (Houston) (1947) 5300 Main Street, Houston, Texas
- Wyoming Presbyterian Church, 432 Wyoming Avenue, Millburn, New Jersey
- Church of St. James the Less, 10 Church Lane, Scarsdale, New York
- Scarsdale Community Baptist Church, 51 Popham Road, Scarsdale, New York

== See also ==
- Harde & Short
- Trinity Cathedral. Columbia, SC
