= Nazair Jones =

American football player (born 1994)

No. 92
- Position: Defensive tackle

Personal information
- Born: December 13, 1994 (age 31); Roanoke Rapids, North Carolina, U.S.
- Listed height: 6 ft 5 in (1.96 m)
- Listed weight: 304 lb (138 kg)

Career information
- High school: Roanoke Rapids
- College: North Carolina
- NFL draft: 2017: 3rd round, 102nd overall pick

Career history
- Seattle Seahawks (2017–2019); Buffalo Bills (2021)*
- * Offseason or practice squad member only

Career NFL statistics
- Total tackles: 26
- Sacks: 2
- Fumble recoveries: 1
- Interceptions: 1
- Stats at Pro Football Reference

Nazair Jones (born December 13, 1994) is an American former professional football player who was a defensive tackle in the National Football League (NFL). He played college football for the North Carolina Tar Heels.

== Professional career ==
=== Pre-draft ===
On December 9, 2016, Jones released a statement through his Instagram account and announced his decision to forgo his remaining eligibility and enter the 2017 NFL draft. Jones attended the NFL Scouting Combine in Indianapolis and performed the majority of drills, but elected to skip the bench press, short shuttle, and three-cone drill. On March 13, 2017, Jones participated at North Carolina's pro day and chose to perform the 40-yard dash (5.15s), 20-yard dash (2.99s), 10-yard dash (1.77s), bench press (18 reps), broad jump (8 ft 10 in or 2.69 m), and short shuttle (4.64s). At the conclusion of the pre-draft process, Jones was projected to be a third round pick by NFL draft scouts and analysts. He was ranked the eighth best defensive tackle prospect in the draft by DraftScout.com and was ranked the 18th best defensive tackle by Scouts Inc.

Pre-draft measurables
Height	Weight	Arm length	Hand span	40-yard dash	10-yard split	20-yard split	20-yard shuttle	Three-cone drill	Vertical jump	Broad jump	Bench press
6 ft 5 1/8 in (1.96 m)	304 lb (138 kg)	34 5/8 in (0.88 m)	10 7/8 in (0.28 m)	5.11 s	1.80 s	2.95 s	4.63 s	7.93 s	24 1/2 in (0.62 m)	8 ft 5 in (2.57 m)	18 reps
All values from NFL Combine/North Carolina's Pro Day

=== Seattle Seahawks ===
==== 2017 ====
The Seattle Seahawks selected Jones in the third round (102nd overall) of the 2017 NFL Draft. Jones was the sixth defensive tackle drafted in 2017. On May 11, 2017, the Seahawks signed Jones to a four-year, $3.17 million contract that includes a signing bonus of $706,288.

External videos
- Seahawks draft Nazair Jones 102nd overall

Throughout training camp, Jones competed to be a backup defensive tackle against Garrison Smith, Jeremy Liggins, and Shaneil Jenkins. Head coach Pete Carroll named Jones the third defensive tackle on the depth chart to begin the regular season, behind Sheldon Richardson and Jarran Reed.

He made his professional regular season debut in the Seahawks' season-opener at the Green Bay Packers and recorded one solo tackle, deflected a pass, and returned an interception for a touchdown during their 17–9 loss. Jones made his first career interception off a pass attempt by Packers' quarterback Aaron Rodgers, that was originally a screen pass intended for tight end Lance Kendricks, and returned it for a 64-yard touchdown in the first quarter. However, his touchdown was nullified due a penalty on Cliff Avril for an illegal block in the back during the return. The Packers declined another penalty on cornerback Jeremy Lane who was ejected for throwing a punch during the play. On November 5, 2017, Jones earned his first career start after Sheldon Richardson suffered an oblique injury and was listed as inactive. Jones finished the Seahawks' 17–14 loss to the Washington Redskins with three combined tackles and was also credited with half a sack. The following week, Jones recorded two solo tackles and made his first career solo sack during a 22–16 victory at the Arizona Cardinals in Week 10. Jones' first career solo sack was on Cardinals' quarterback Drew Stanton for an eight-yard loss in the fourth quarter. In Week 11, he collected a season-high four combined tackles as the Seahawks lost 34–31 to the Atlanta Falcons. On December 30, 2017, the Seahawks officially placed Jones on injured reserve after he was inactive for four games (Weeks 13–16) due to a high ankle sprain in Week 12. Jones completed his rookie season in 2017 with 19 combined tackles (ten solo), three pass deflections, two sacks, and one interception in 11 games and two starts.

==== 2018 ====
On January 16, 2018, the Seahawks announced their decision to fire defensive coordinator Kris Richard and hire their former linebacker coach Ken Norton Jr. to be Richard's successor. During training camp, Jones competed to be a starting defensive tackle against Shamar Stephen after it was left vacant by the departure of Sheldon Richardson. Head coach Pete Carroll named Jones the fourth defensive tackle on the depth chart to begin the regular season, behind Jarran Reed, Tom Johnson, and Shamar Stephen. Jones was inactive as a healthy scratch for the Seahawks' 27–24 loss at the Denver Broncos in their season-opener. Jones was also inactive, as a healthy scratch, for the Seahawks' 33–31 loss to the Los Angeles Rams in Week 5.

==== 2019 ====
On August 27, 2019, Jones was placed on injured reserve with a knee injury. On May 4, 2020, Jones was released by the Seahawks.

Jones had a tryout with the Chicago Bears on August 20, 2020.

=== Buffalo Bills ===
On June 22, 2021, Jones signed a contract with the Buffalo Bills. He was waived on July 16, 2021.

On July 18, 2021, two days after being waived by the Bills, Jones announced his retirement from the NFL via Instagram. In the same post, he announced he would be shifting his focus to his mentoring program, Made Mentoring.
