= Dovey Johnson Roundtree =

American lawyer

Dovey Mae Johnson Roundtree
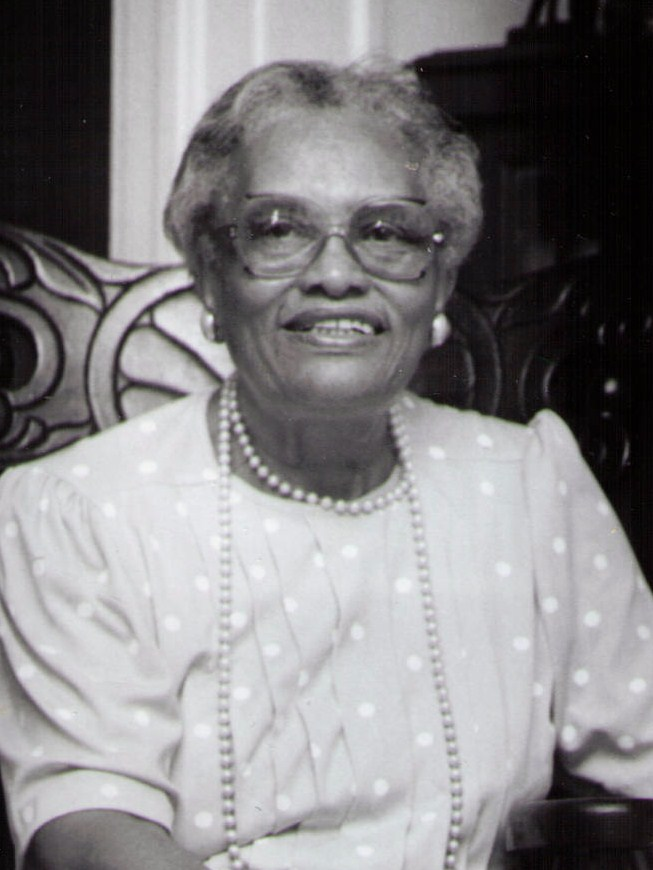
- Roundtree pictured in Charlotte, North Carolina in 1994
- Born: Dovey Mae Johnson Roundtree; April 17, 1914; Charlotte, North Carolina, U.S.
- Died: May 21, 2018 (aged 104); Charlotte, North Carolina, U.S.
- Education: Spelman College; Howard University School of Law
- Occupations: Civil rights and criminal defense lawyer, minister, Army veteran
- Years active: 1951–1996
- Known for: Co-Counsel for the petitioner in Sarah Keys v. Carolina Coach Company (64 MCC 769 (1955); First black member of DC Women's Bar; American Bar Association 2000 Margaret Brent Award winner
- Spouse: William Roundtree (1946-1947; divorced)
- Website: doveyjohnsonroundtree.com

Dovey Mae Johnson Roundtree (April 17, 1914 – May 21, 2018) was an African-American civil rights activist, ordained minister, and attorney. Her 1955 victory before the Interstate Commerce Commission in the first bus desegregation case to be brought before the ICC resulted in the only explicit repudiation of the "separate but equal" doctrine in the field of interstate bus transportation by a court or federal administrative body. That case, Sarah Keys v. Carolina Coach Company (64 MCC 769 (1955)), which Dovey Roundtree brought before the ICC with her law partner and mentor, Julius Winfield Robertson, was invoked by Attorney General Robert F. Kennedy during the 1961 Freedom Riders' campaign in his successful battle to convince the Interstate Commerce Commission to enforce its rulings and end Jim Crow laws in public transportation.

A protégé of black activist and educator Mary McLeod Bethune, Roundtree was selected by Bethune for the first class of African-American women to be trained as officers in the newly created Women's Army Auxiliary Corps (later the Women's Army Corps) during World War II. In 1961 she became one of the first women to receive full ministerial status in the African Methodist Episcopal Church, which had just begun ordaining women at a level beyond mere preachers in 1960. With her controversial admission to the all-white Women's Bar of the District of Columbia in 1962, she broke the color bar for minority women in the Washington legal community. In one of Washington's most sensational and widely covered murder cases, United States v. Ray Crump, tried in the summer of 1965 on the eve of the Watts riots, Roundtree won acquittal for the black laborer accused of the murder of Georgetown socialite (and former wife of a CIA officer) Mary Pinchot Meyer, a woman with romantic ties to President John F. Kennedy.

The founding partner of the Washington, D.C. law firm of Roundtree, Knox, Hunter and Parker in 1970 following the death of her first law partner, Julius Robertson in 1961, Roundtree was special consultant for legal affairs to the AME Church, and General Counsel to the National Council of Negro Women. She was the inspiration for actress Cicely Tyson's depiction of a maverick civil rights lawyer in the television series "Sweet Justice", and the recipient, along with retired Supreme Court Justice Sandra Day O'Connor, of the American Bar Association's 2000 Margaret Brent Women Lawyers of Achievement Award.

== Early life and influences ==
Dovey Mae Johnson was born in Charlotte, North Carolina, the second oldest of four daughters of James Eliot Johnson, a printer in the local offices of the African Methodist Episcopal Zion Church, and Lela Bryant Johnson, a seamstress and domestic. Following the death of her father in the influenza epidemic of 1919, Roundtree and her mother and sisters went to live with her maternal grandmother, Rachel Bryant Graham, and her husband, the Rev. Clyde L. Graham, a minister in the A.M.E. Zion Church. Her grandmother weathered the death of her first husband, who was killed by the Ku Klux Klan. When Rachel Graham was a teenager, she ran from a white man who had reportedly tried to molest her. Enraged, he stomped on her feet, making sure she would never run again. Although Rachel Bryant Graham had only a third-grade education, she wielded great influence in Charlotte's black community. Through her involvement in the colored women's club movement she formed a friendship with Mary McLeod Bethune, who at that time traveled extensively through the South as head of the National Association of Colored Women's Clubs, the precursor to the National Council of Negro Women. Bethune's vision inspired Roundtree to excel academically, rise above poverty and Jim Crow, target a medical career, and work her way through Spelman College from 1934 to 1938, at the height of the Great Depression.

It was Bethune to whom Roundtree turned to in 1941, as the threat of World War II generated unprecedented numbers of jobs for African Americans in the country's "defense preparedness" program. Resigning from the South Carolina teaching position she had taken up on college graduation in 1938, she sought out Bethune in Washington, D.C. for assistance in obtaining employment in the burgeoning defense industry. Bethune immediately tapped her for the select group of 40 African-American women who were to become the first to train as officers in the newly created Women's Army Auxiliary Corps.

== Army service ==
Roundtree publicly challenged the racial discrimination she confronted in the rigidly segregated Army even as she recruited other African-American women for the WAAC on assignment in the Deep South. Traveling in uniform in the winter of 1943 without Army protection, she was evicted from a Miami bus and forced under threat of arrest to yield her seat to a white Marine. She persisted in her recruiting, bringing African-American women into the Corps in such numbers that although the women served in segregated units, the groundwork was laid for an interracial Army four years before President Harry Truman mandated the desegregation of the military by Executive Order 9981 in 1948.

== Legal career ==
Roundtree first entered the civil rights arena in October 1945 in a nine-month postwar assignment with black labor leader A. Philip Randolph, who was staging a national campaign to make the wartime Fair Employment Practice Committee (FEPC) a permanent entity. Her FEPC involvement brought her into contact with the person who would inspire her to take on the law as her life's mission: Constitutional lawyer Pauli Murray, an impassioned civil rights activist and legal academic who later founded the National Organization for Women. Inspired by Murray's belief that the greatest instrument for social change was the law, Roundtree enrolled at Howard University School of Law in the fall of 1947, one of only five women in her class. From 1947 to 1950, she immersed herself in the assault on school segregation being mounted by Thurgood Marshall and Howard Law professors James Nabrit Jr. and George E. C. Hayes which in 1954 culminated in the epochal Supreme Court's Brown v. Board of Education decision.

== Desegregating bus travel ==
In 1952, during her first year of legal practice, Roundtree, along with her partner and mentor, Julius Winfield Robertson, took on a bus desegregation case that would make legal history: Sarah Keys v. Carolina Coach Company (1955). The case originated in a complaint by an African-American WAC private named Sarah Louise Keys, who had been forced by a North Carolina bus driver to yield her seat to a white Marine. Dovey Roundtree's former Howard Law School professor, Frank Reeves, then head of the Washington DC office of the NAACP, referred Sarah Keys to Dovey Roundtree because of Roundtree's own experiences with bus segregation during her World War II WAC service. For Roundtree, the case became a personal mission. "It was as though I sat looking in a mirror, so strong was my sense of walking where Sarah Keys had walked," Roundtree recalled in her 2019 autobiography, Mighty Justice. The Keys case challenged the right of a private bus carrier to impose its Jim Crow laws on black passengers traveling across state lines.

When the matter was dismissed by the US District Court for the District of Columbia on jurisdictional grounds, Roundtree and Robertson took their complaint to the Interstate Commerce Commission, the federal administrative body charged with the enforcement of the Interstate Commerce Act. Their complaint, along with the NAACP's companion train case, was rejected by ICC hearing examiner Isadore Freidson on their first pass. The case would have died at that point had it not been for Roundtree's outreach to Congressman Adam Clayton Powell in Sarah Keys' Congressional district to protest the hearing examiner's ruling and demand a hearing by the full 11-man commission. Following Powell's intervention, the full hearing was granted, and Roundtree and Robertson were given 30 days to file exceptions. In those exceptions, they invoked both the commerce clause of the US Constitution as well as the Supreme Court's reasoning in Brown v. Board, handed down in May of that same year, and applied Brown explicitly to the area of public transportation. On November 7, 1955, in a historic ruling in which the ICC departed from its long history of adherence to the Plessy v. Ferguson (1896) ruling, the Commission banned separate but equal for the first time in the field of interstate bus travel. In the Keys case, and in the companion railway case that the NAACP had filed shortly after Keys (NAACP v. St. Louis-San Francisco Railway Company 297 ICC 335 (1955), the ICC broke with its precedent and ruled that the nondiscrimination language of the Interstate Commerce Act prohibited segregation itself.

Though hailed by the press as a historic breakthrough and a "symbol of a movement that cannot be held back," the Keys case lay dormant from 1955 to 1961, its intent largely blunted by the ICC commissioner who had dissented from the majority opinion, South Carolina Democrat J. Monroe Johnson. It was not until the summer of 1961, when the violence resulting from the Freedom Riders' campaign prompted Attorney General Robert F. Kennedy to take action against the ICC that the impact of the Keys case was felt. On May 29, 1961, responding to the protests of civil rights leaders, Kennedy issued a Justice Department petition in which he cited Keys and the companion NAACP train case, along with the 1960 Supreme Court Boynton v. Virginia ruling and called upon the ICC to enforce the ruling it had handed down itself in 1955. Under pressure from the Attorney General, the Commission at last acted upon its own rulings and in September 1961 put a permanent end to segregation in travel across state lines.

== Washington, D.C. ==
While fighting the civil rights battle on the national level, Roundtree and her partner, Julius Robertson, undertook to represent Black clients in civil and criminal matters in the segregated courtrooms of Washington, DC. At a time when Black lawyers had to leave the courthouses to use the bathrooms and Black clients were routinely referred to white attorneys in order to maximize their chances in court, Roundtree and Robertson broke with tradition. They pressed the cases of Black clients before white judges and juries and prevailed, winning sizeable recoveries in accident and negligence cases. Their 1957 victory in a negligence case against a Washington, DC psychiatric facility, which resulted in the maximum recovery allowable under the Federal Tort Claims Act at that time, was widely regarded as a turning point not only for Black clients in the Nation's Capital, but for Black attorneys as well.

The sudden death of her partner Julius Robertson of a heart attack in November 1961 marked a turning point for Dovey Roundtree, who as an African-American woman found herself a sole practitioner in a legal community still dominated by men. "At a time when a female lawyer of any race was regarded skeptically, I'd derived a significant measure of credibility from my association with Julius," she later wrote, adding that in the wake of Robertson's death, "there were times when I felt truly vulnerable." Sustained by her ordination into the ministry of the African Methodist Episcopal Church on November 30, 1961, Dovey Roundtree went on to build a thriving law practice, working as a sole practitioner for nine years before founding a second law firm, Roundtree Knox Hunter and Parker, in 1970.

In 1962, she broke another barrier with her nomination for membership to the all-white Women's Bar Association of the District of Columbia by attorney Joyce Hens Green (later an Associate Judge on the US District Court for the District of Columbia Circuit). The nomination precipitated a firestorm of controversy, with several of the Association's board members vehemently opposing Roundtree's nomination. Only when Green demanded a vote by the full membership was Roundtree admitted to the Women's Bar as its first Black member.

== Ray Crump ==
It was Roundtree's successful defense of the Black laborer accused of the 1964 murder of Kennedy mistress Mary Pinchot Meyer that solidified her reputation in the Washington, D.C. legal community. For a fee of one dollar, Roundtree took on the defense of Ray Crump, Jr., accused of the execution-style shooting of Meyer as she took her daily walk along the C & O Canal. Crump, who had been found by police wandering along the towpath near the scene of the crime, was arrested on the word of an eyewitness who claimed Crump resembled the Black man he had seen standing over Meyer's body moments after the murder. He had then been indicted without a preliminary hearing. Convinced that Crump's limited mental capacity rendered him incapable of perpetrating a murder of such stealth and meticulousness, Roundtree took on the United States government in a July 1965 trial in which the notoriety of the victim drew record crowds of lawyers, law students, and reporters to the United States District Court.

Against the elaborate circumstantial case presented by US Attorney Alfred Hantman and his legal team, Roundtree pitted a single fact: Crump's diminutive size. At five feet three and a half inches and 130 pounds, Roundtree argued, Crump was four to five inches shorter and at least 50 pounds lighter than the man described by the eyewitness. Stunning the court with the brevity and simplicity of her thirty-minute case, Roundtree called only three witnesses, each of whom testified to Crump's good character, and she presented but a single exhibit: Raymond Crump himself. The not-guilty verdict in the case cemented Roundtree's reputation among Washington trial lawyers and judges, and resulted in her appointment to high-profile murder cases, including the 1977 defense of John Griffin in a sensational retrial for his alleged role in the murder of Hanafi Muslim children in 1973 at a District of Columbia residence.

== Death ==
Dovey Johnson Roundtree turned 100 in April 2014 and died at the age of 104 in May 2018.

== Advocacy for children and the family ==
In the latter years of her practice, Roundtree forged a unique role for herself, melding her ministerial duties at Washington's Allen Chapel AME Church, located in one of the city's most violent neighborhoods, with her legal practice, concentrating her focus on family and ecumenical law. Through religious organizations and legal groups, she became a public advocate for the welfare of young children, who she believed were imperiled by societal violence and the disintegration of the family. She continued in this role following her retirement from active legal practice in 1996.

== Awards and honors ==
Roundtree was honored by local and national bar associations and legal and religious institutions. She received the 1995 Distinguished Alumna Award from the Howard Law Alumni Of Greater Washington, the 1995 National Bar Association Charlotte E. Ray Award, the 1996 Spirit of Spelman College Founder's Day Award, the American Bar Association's 2000 Margaret Brent Women Lawyers of Achievement Award, the 2004 Living Legacy Award from the Howard University School of Divinity, and the 2006 Award of Excellence from the Charlotte, North Carolina Chapter of the Thurgood Marshall Scholarship Fund. In 2011, she received the Janet B. Reno Torchbearer Award from the Women's Bar Association of the District of Columbia, which she had integrated in 1962.

Roundtree's autobiography, initially released with the title Justice Older than the Law, written with National Magazine Award-winner Katie McCabe, won the 2009 Letitia Woods Brown Memorial Book Prize from the Association of Black Women Historians. It was reissued in 2019 by Algonquin Books (Workman Publishing) with the title Mighty Justice: My Life in Civil Rights. Her memoir inspired two children's books, both co-authored by Katie McCabe, a 2020 middle-grade adaptation entitled Mighty Justice, and a 2021 picture book, We Wait for the Sun, which won the 2022 Coretta Scott King Illustrator Honor Award.

Roundtree was saluted by First Lady Michelle Obama on the occasion of the initial release of her autobiography. In a letter made public at a July 23, 2009, tribute to Roundtree at the Women in Military Service for America Memorial at Arlington National Cemetery, the First Lady cited Roundtree's historic contributions to the law, the military and the ministry, and stated: "It is on the shoulders of people like Dovey Johnson Roundtree that we stand today, and it is with her commitment to our core ideals that we will continue moving toward a better tomorrow."

== Legacy ==
In 2011 a scholarship fund was created in her name by the Charlotte Chapter of the National Alumnae Association of Spelman College. Roundtree also received the 2011 Torchbearer Award from the Women's Bar Association of the District of Columbia, the organization which she integrated in 1962. Following her death in 2018, the Women's Bar of DC created The Dovey Roundtree Rule to guide Washington law firms in increasing the hiring of minority women for leadership positions. In March 2013, an affordable senior living facility in the Southeast Washington DC community where she ministered was named "The Roundtree Residences" in her honor.

In June 2020, amid nationwide protests over the murder of George Floyd, a $40 million donation to Spelman College from Netflix CEO Reed Hastings and his wife, Patty Quillin, funded a scholarship that Spelman named for Dovey Johnson Roundtree. Calling the donation "a historic gift in response to the historic moment we are experiencing", Spelman president Mary Schmidt Campbell noted that Hastings' overall gift of $120 million to Spelman and two other institutions was the largest single donation ever made to Historically Black Colleges and Universities.
