= St. Athanasius Episcopal Church and Parish House and the Church of the Holy Comforter =

Historic church in North Carolina, United States

- U.S. National Register of Historic Places
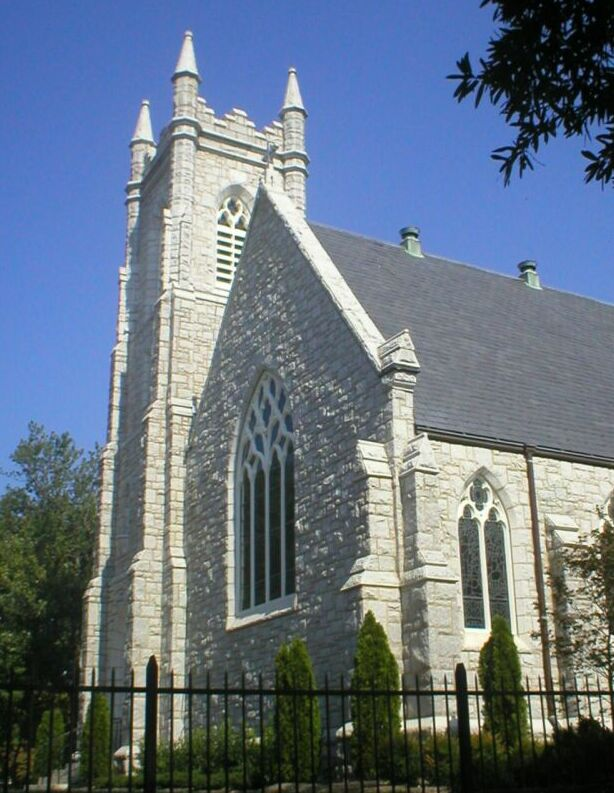
- Church of the Holy Comforter

- Location within North Carolina Location within the United States
- Location: 300 E. Webb Ave. and 320 E. Davis St., Burlington, North Carolina
- Coordinates: 36°5′30″N 79°26′3″W
- Area: 3 acres (1.2 ha)
- Built: 1879-1880, 1887, 1911, 1926, 1963
- Architect: Hobart Upjohn; Johannes Adam Simon Oertel
- Architectural style: Late Gothic Revival, Gothic Revival, Carpenter Gothic
- NRHP reference No.: 79001653
- Added to NRHP: May 29, 1979

St. Athanasius Episcopal Church and Parish House and the Church of the Holy Comforter is a historic Episcopal church complex located at 300 E. Webb Avenue and 320 E. Davis Street in Burlington, Alamance County, North Carolina, United States.

== Description and history ==
St. Athanasius Church is a small Carpenter Gothic chapel designed by Johannes Adam Simon Oertel and built in 1879–1880. Adjacent to St. Athanasius is the Parish House (1887). In 1911, the Neo-Gothic Revival style Church of the Holy Comforter was designed by Hobart Upjohn and built west of St. Athanasius. The Neo-Gothic Revival style Parish House was added in 1926. The Parish House addition and Great Hall were added in 1963. Between St Athanasius Church and Church of the Holy Comforter is a cemetery with graves dating to 1882.

It was added to the National Register of Historic Places in 1979.
