= First Presbyterian Church (Wilmington, North Carolina) =

Presbyterian church in Wilmington, North Carolina

Coordinates: 34.2332°N 77.9454°W

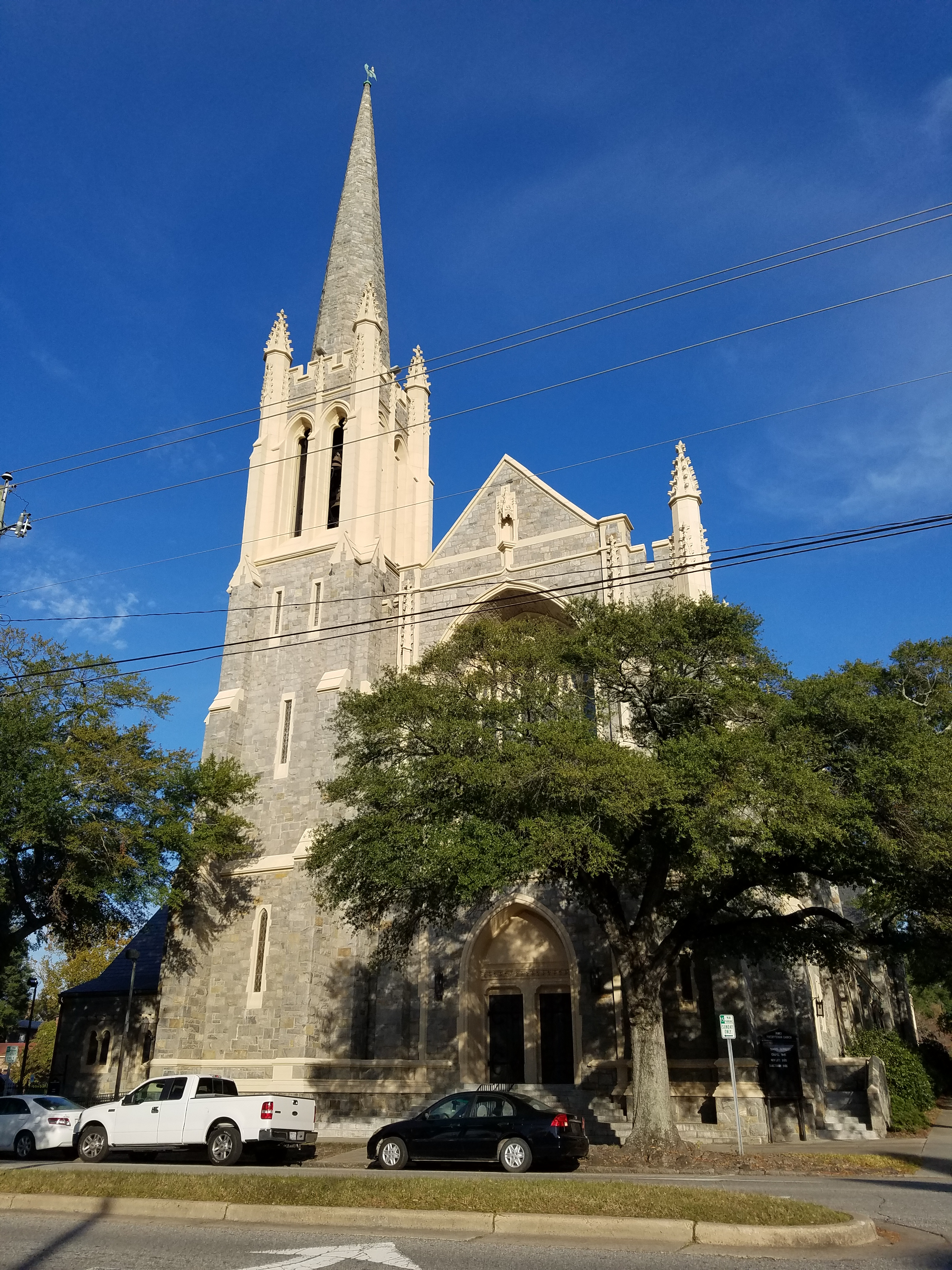

Religion
- Affiliation: Presbyterian Church USA
- District: Synod of South Atlantic
- Status: Active

Location
- Location: City of Wilmington; North Carolina; United States of America
- State: North Carolina
- Interactive map of First Presbyterian Church

Architecture
- Architect: Hobart Brown Upjohn
- Style: Gothic Revival
- Groundbreaking: 1818; 208 years ago (destroyed by fire)
- Completed: 1925; 101 years ago

Website
- https://www.firstonthird.org/

First Presbyterian Church is a Presbyterian church in Wilmington, North Carolina. It was the first Presbyterian congregation in the city of Wilmington.

== History ==
An established group existed in Wilmington as early as 1760, when the first resident Presbyterian minister arrived. In 1785, the "Protestant Presbyterian Church of Wilmington" was incorporated by the State Legislature. The church seems to have continued its semi-independent existence until April 4, 1817, when it was received into the Fayetteville Presbytery of the Presbyterian Church.

Fire destroyed the first three buildings erected by this congregation. The first two, built in 1818 and 1821, were located on Front Street, between Dock and Orange. The cornerstone of the 1821 building is now at the foot of the stairs of the Kenan tower. The third building, which was constructed on this present site, was dedicated on April 28, 1861 (just weeks after the start of the Civil War), and burned on New Year's Eve, 1925. It was succeeded by this present building, which was completed in 1928.

The Lectern Bible, which is displayed on the front of the Lectern, is one of the few physical links left to this congregation from its past. It was the Pulpit Bible of the 1861 church and escaped the 1925 fire only because it had been stolen from the pulpit when the Union Army occupied Wilmington during the Civil War. Descendants of the Union officer into whose hands it eventually passed returned it to the church in 1928.

The present church building was designed by the noted architect Hobart Upjohn. His plans included architectural styles from three different periods: the Norman, as represented in the Chapel; the English Decorated Gothic (actually Middle Period Gothic with French influence), in the Sanctuary; the Elizabethan, in the Church School Building. The windows in the Sanctuary are the work of Henry Lee Willet of Philadelphia. The large clerestory windows have as their unifying theme the "I Am's" of Christ. Beginning on the Lectern side, closest to the Chancel, they depict: the Creation, Moses and the Prophets, the Nativity, Childhood, and Discipleship. And on the Pulpit side, beginning closest to the Chancel: Christ's Ministry, the Parables, the Miracles, Pentecost and (the short window) Sonship. The small lancet windows on the aisles have as their theme "Christ, The Lord of Life." Each group of three windows expresses a particular theme, as noted on the brass plaques below the windows. The Great West Window was given in 1986 in memory of Colonel Walker Taylor. Under a rose window at the top, a descending dove of the Holy Spirit points downward to the triumphant Christ which dominates the window. The organ was built by Ernest M. Skinner, one of America's master organ builders. It was built exactly to suit the structure of the church building, and since a recent renovation, should sound just as it did when Mr. Skinner finished work on it. The organ is a memorial to James Sprunt, who was a ruling Elder in this church. The windows in the Kenan Memorial Chapel were created by Owen Bonawits of New York and are of antique stained glass treated so that they are truly antique in color. These windows represent the Twelve Apostles.

The pipe organ in the chapel was given as a gift in 1993 by the Kenan family, replacing the original pipe organ and a later Hammond electronic organ was built and designed by the Noack Organ Company of Georgetown, Massachusetts. It has a two manual one pedal keyboard with nine stops designed in scale and Norman design to enhance the service in the Chapel. A new office wing was completed in 1995. Its Elizabethan architectural style is compatible with that of the Church School Building which was remodeled to include an elevator, new kitchen, enlarged Gilmour Hall, a new library and history room. Thomas Woodrow Wilson, 28th President of the United States, was a member of this church during the years his father, Dr. Joseph R. Wilson, was Pastor (1874-1885). Woodrow Wilson was a college student at the time; he spent one full year and his vacations in the Manse, which stood at the corner of Fourth and Orange Streets. A copy of a letter he wrote back to the church in 1886 is on display in the room at the Southeast corner of the Sanctuary (the door near the Lectern). This church has a long history of concern for missions. All the Presbyterian churches in the Wilmington area owe some degree of credit for their founding to the outreach of First Church, many of them having sprung from missions started and sustained by this congregation. A special concern for overseas missions developed after a series of evangelistic services conducted by Dwight L. Moody in 1893. Two years later, this church gave its first missionaries to the foreign field, and for many years the mission station at Kian-Yin, China, was fully supported by this church. In addition to the support of the Presbyterian Church USA mission programs, this church now partially supports a medical mission in Haiti. Physicians and other members of the church form a medical team which travels there whenever possible.
