= Kareem Martin =

American football player (born 1992)

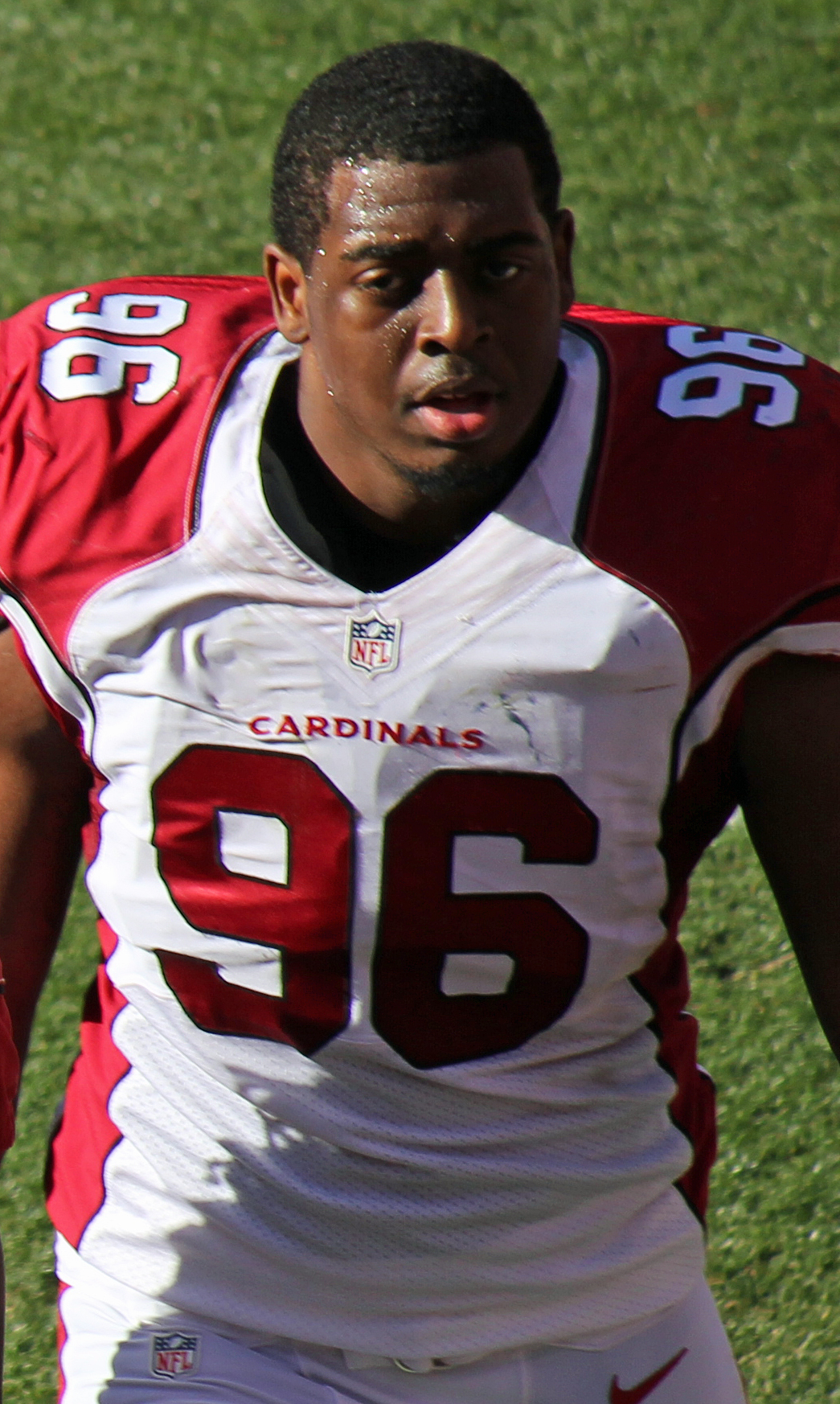
- Martin with the Arizona Cardinals in 2014

No. 96, 69
- Position: Defensive end

Personal information
- Born: February 19, 1992 (age 34); Roanoke Rapids, North Carolina, U.S.
- Listed height: 6 ft 6 in (1.98 m)
- Listed weight: 263 lb (119 kg)

Career information
- High school: Roanoke Rapids
- College: North Carolina (2010–2013)
- NFL draft: 2014: 3rd round, 84th overall pick

Career history
- Arizona Cardinals (2014–2017); New York Giants (2018–2019); Detroit Lions (2020)

Awards and highlights
- First-team All-ACC (2013); Second-team All-ACC (2012)

Career NFL statistics
- Total tackles: 105
- Sacks: 6.0
- Forced fumbles: 5
- Interceptions: 1
- Stats at Pro Football Reference

Kareem Martin (born February 19, 1992) is an American former professional football player who was a defensive end in the National Football League (NFL). He was selected by the Arizona Cardinals in the third round of the 2014 NFL draft. He played college football for the North Carolina Tar Heels. He also played for the New York Giants and Detroit Lions.

== Early life ==
A native of Roanoke Rapids, North Carolina, he attended Roanoke Rapids High School, where he was a letterman in football, basketball and track. In football, Martin was twice named the area defensive player of the year. As a senior, he helped lead the Roanoke Rapids football team to an undefeated season and a conference title. He finished his senior season with 163 tackles, 10 forced fumbles, three fumble recoveries, four sacks and one interception, and also had 25 tackles for a loss. He had 121 tackles and five sacks as a junior.

In track & field, Martin was one of the state's top performers in the jumping and hurdling events. He qualified for the state meet in the high jump by leaping 6 ft 6 in (1.99 m) at the 2010 NCHSAA 2A Mideast Regional. In addition, he also took 5th in the 110-meter hurdles event in that same meet, recording a personal-best time of 15.84 second. At the NCHSAA 2A Track State Championships, he tied for 2nd place in the high jump, with a leap of 6 ft 6 in (1.98 m). He was also named the 2009–10 NCHSAA Male Athlete of the Year.

Considered a three-star recruit by Rivals.com, he was rated the 28th best weakside defensive end in the nation. Martin accepted a scholarship offer from North Carolina over offers from Duke and Virginia Tech and majored in public policy.

== College career ==
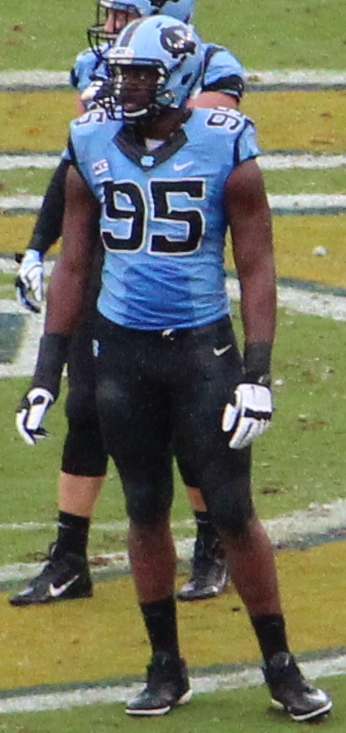
Martin during his tenure at North Carolina

As a true freshman in 2010, Martin played in 11 games, starting the first three games against LSU, Georgia Tech and Rutgers. He capped off his season with 16 tackles, including 1.5 for loss, one pass breakup and two quarterback pressures. In 2011, he started all 13 games at defensive end. He finished the regular season with 40 tackles, seven tackles for losses, four sacks, one fumble recovery, six pass breakups and five quarterback hurries. In 2011, he started all 12 games and earned second-team All-Atlantic Coast Conference (ACC) honors. He totaled 40 tackles, including 15.5 for loss, four sacks, eight quarterback hurries and three pass breakups. He also forced one fumble and recovered another. As a senior, he earned first-team All-ACC honors after finishing his season best for third on the team with 82 tackles, 21.5 tackles for loss, 11.5 sacks, 14 quarterback hurries, three forced fumbles and two fumble recoveries.

== Professional career ==
Pre-draft measurables
Height	Weight	Arm length	Hand span	Wingspan	40-yard dash	10-yard split	20-yard split	20-yard shuttle	Three-cone drill	Vertical jump	Broad jump	Bench press
6 ft 5 7/8 in (1.98 m)	272 lb (123 kg)	35 in (0.89 m)	10 in (0.25 m)	7 ft 0 1/2 in (2.15 m)	4.72 s	1.64 s	2.71 s	4.33 s	7.20 s	35.5 in (0.90 m)	10 ft 9 in (3.28 m)	22 reps
All values from NFL Combine

=== Arizona Cardinals ===
Martin was selected by the Arizona Cardinals in the third round (84th overall) of the 2014 NFL draft.

=== New York Giants ===
On March 15, 2018, Martin signed a three-year, $21 million contract with the New York Giants with $7.5 million guaranteed.

On September 11, 2019, Martin was placed on injured reserve after suffering a knee injury in week one against the Dallas Cowboys. He was designated for return from injured reserve on November 27, 2019, and began practicing with the team again. He was activated on December 7, 2019.

On February 26, 2020, Martin was released from the Giants.

=== Detroit Lions ===
On September 15, 2020, Martin was signed to the practice squad of the Detroit Lions. He was elevated to the active roster on December 12 and December 19 for the team's weeks 14 and 15 games against the Green Bay Packers and Tennessee Titans, and reverted to the practice squad after each game. His contract expired when the teams season ended January 3, 2021.
