= First Presbyterian Church (Fayetteville, North Carolina) =

Historic church in North Carolina, United States

- U.S. National Register of Historic Places
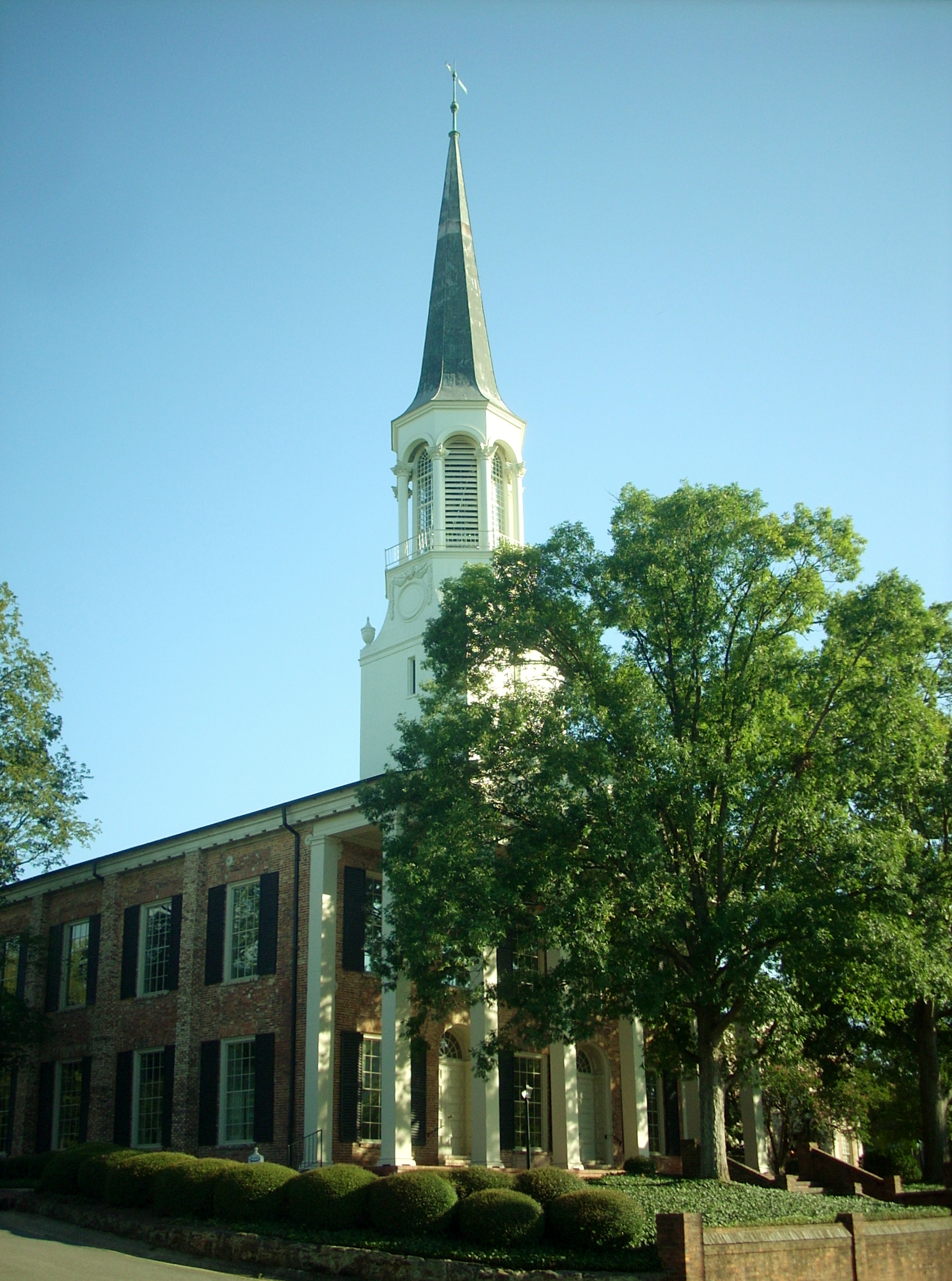
- First Presbyterian of Fayetteville

- Location within North Carolina Location within the United States
- Location: Ann and Bow Sts., Fayetteville, North Carolina
- Coordinates: 35°3′12″N 78°52′32″W
- Area: 6 acres (2.4 ha)
- Built: 1816, 1832
- Architect: Davis, A. J.; Hobart Upjohn
- Architectural style: Federal
- NRHP reference No.: 76001317
- Added to NRHP: April 30, 1976

First Presbyterian Church is a historic Presbyterian church located at Ann and Bow Streets in Fayetteville, Cumberland County, North Carolina. It was built in 1832, incorporating parts of the brick walls of an earlier (1816) church that burned in 1831. It is a two-story gabled brick building, five bays wide and five wider bays deep. Its brickwork is laid in Flemish bond. The chancel, portico, steeple and most of the interior woodwork are later additions and replacements. The hexastyle portico and steeple were designed by Hobart Upjohn in 1922.

It was listed on the National Register of Historic Places in 1976.
