= Meredith Kinleigh =

- Birth name: Meredith Leigh Schmaltz
- Also known as: Meredith Kinleigh
- Born: February 21, 1994 (age 31); Fayetteville, North Carolina, U.S.
- Origin: Roanoke Rapids, North Carolina, U.S.
- Genres: Worship, Christian pop
- Occupation(s): Singer, songwriter
- Instrument: vocals
- Years active: 2015–present
- Labels: Inov8
- Website: meredithkinleigh.com

Meredith Leigh Schmaltz (born February 21, 1994), who goes by the stage name Meredith Kinleigh, is an American Christian musician, who plays a Christian pop style of contemporary worship music. She released, Beautiful Mess, an extended play, in 2015.

== Early and personal life ==
Meredith Kinleigh was born in Fayetteville, North Carolina, on February 21, 1994, as Meredith Leigh Schmaltz, while she was raised for part of her adolescence in Raeford, North Carolina before going on to attend high school in Roanoke Rapids, North Carolina, and her parents are Pastor David Meredith Schmaltz and Andrea Aseneth Schmaltz (née, Rodriguez). She started singing before her church at ten years-old, at her fathers church in Fayetteville, before they moved to found Valley Church in Weldon, North Carolina, where she serves as the coordinator of their children's ministry. Schmaltz wrote her first song at seventeen years-old, writing 70 songs in two years time.

== Music career ==
Her sister came up with the nickname Kenleigh, however Meredith changed it to Kinleigh. She started her music recording career in 2015, with the extended play, Beautiful Mess, that was released on October 2, 2015, from Inov8 Music Group. Kinleigh was interviewed by the managing editor of Centric Worship, Nate Fancher, for his CMB Podcast. She was named as the third of the top-10 independent artist that should get signed by a major Christian music record label by 365 Days of Inspiring Media.

== Discography ==
EPs

- Beautiful Mess (October 2, 2015)
