= Tom Topping =

American football player (1934–1990)

Duke Blue Devils
- Position: Tackle

Personal information
- Born: November 6, 1934; Roanoke Rapids, North Carolina, U.S.
- Died: August 27, 1990 (aged 55); Cincinnati, Ohio, U.S.

Career information
- College: Duke (1955–1957)

Awards and highlights
- First-team All-American (1957); First-team All-ACC (1957)

John Thomas Topping (November 6, 1934 – August 27, 1990) was an American football player.

He was born in 1934 and grew up in Roanoke Rapids, North Carolina. He attended Duke University in Durham, North Carolina. He graduated in 1953 from Roanoke Rapids High School.

He played college football at the tackle position for the Duke Blue Devils football team from 1955 to 1957. He was selected by the Football Writers Association of America as a first-team guard on Look magazine's 1957 All-America college football team.

Topping later lived in Cuyahoga Falls, Ohio. In 1959, he became employed by Roadway Express, a trucking company in Akron, Ohio. He spent 31 years with the company and became the company's president in 1987. He was inducted into the Duke Sports Hall of Fame in 1989. He died in 1990 at age 55.
