= Roanoke Rapids, North Carolina =

- City
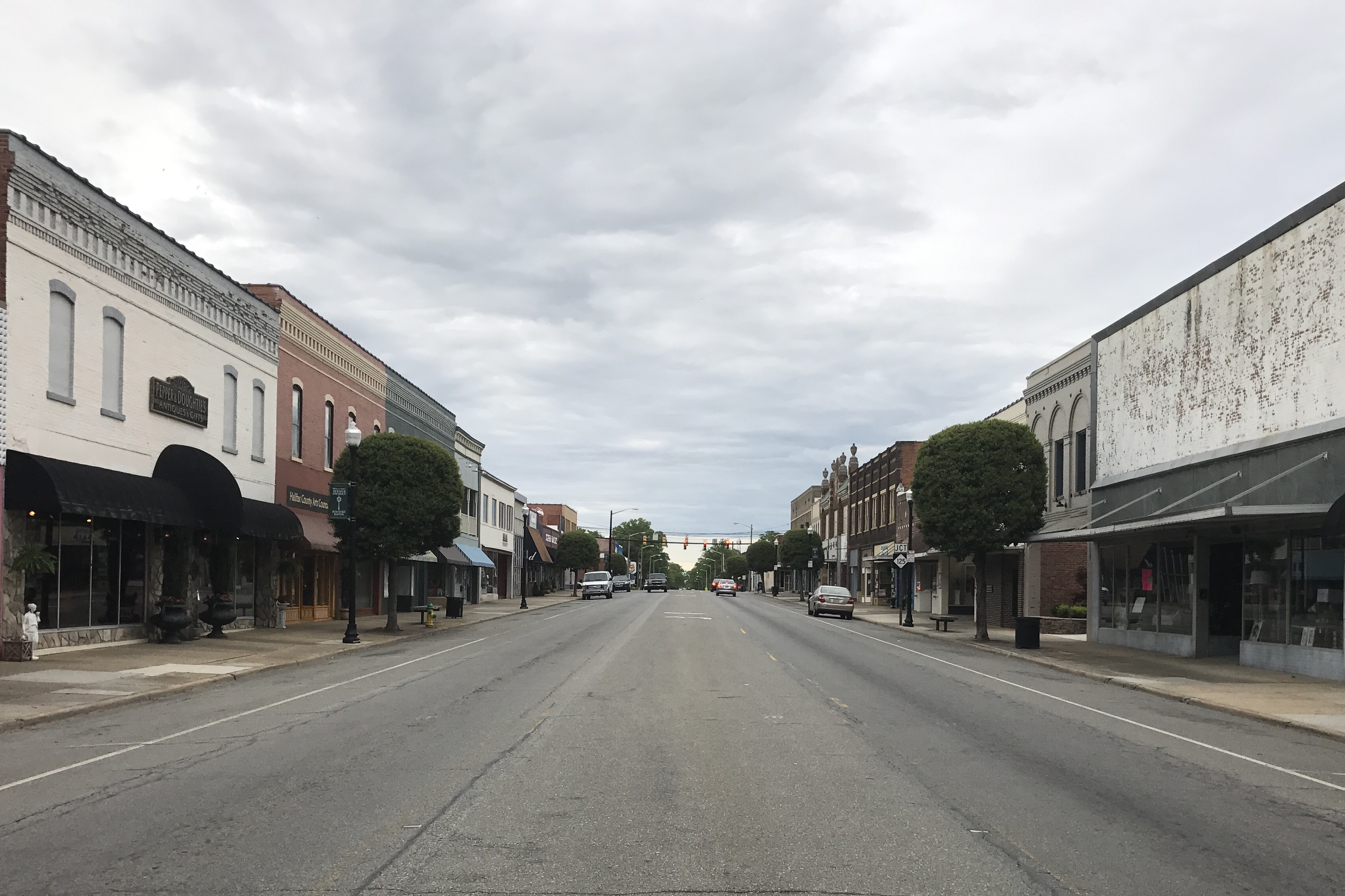
- Roanoke Avenue

- Seal

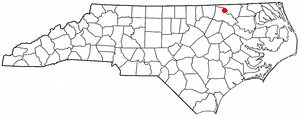
- Location of Roanoke Rapids, North Carolina
- Coordinates: 36°26′43″N 77°38′57″W
- Country: United States
- State: North Carolina
- County: Halifax

Area
  - Total: 9.95 sq mi (25.77 km^{2})
  - Land: 9.91 sq mi (25.67 km^{2})
  - Water: 0.035 sq mi (0.09 km^{2})
- Elevation: 138 ft (42 m)

Population (2020)
  - Total: 15,229
  - Density: 1,536.3/sq mi (593.16/km^{2})
- Time zone: UTC−5 (Eastern (EST))
  - Summer (DST): UTC−4 (EDT)
- ZIP code: 27870
- Area code: 252
- FIPS code: 37-56900
- GNIS feature ID: 2404628
- Website: roanokerapidsnc.gov

Roanoke Rapids (/ˈroʊəˌnoʊk/) is a city in Halifax County, North Carolina, United States. The population was 15,229 at the 2020 census and is the largest community in Halifax County. It is the principal city of the Roanoke Rapids Micropolitan Statistical Area, and is also an anchor city of the Rocky Mount-Wilson-Roanoke Rapids CSA, with a total population of 297,726 as of 2018.

== Geography ==
Roanoke Rapids is located in northern Halifax County bordered to the north by Northampton County, with the county line following the Roanoke River.

According to the United States Census Bureau, the city has a total area of 10.0 square miles (25.9 km^{2}), of which 10.0 square miles (25.8 km^{2}) are land and 0.04 square miles (0.1 km^{2}), or 0.36%, are water.

The town is located at the eastern edge of the North Carolina Piedmont, on the Roanoke River at the fall line, which marks the area where an upland region (continental bedrock) and a coastal plain (coastal alluvia) meet. The fall line is typically prominent where a river crosses it, for there will usually be rapids or waterfalls. Because of these features, riverboats normally could not travel any further inland. Because settlements needed a port and a ready supply of water power, they often developed where the river crosses the fall line. The Roanoke River and its falls inspired the development of Roanoke Rapids; businessmen such as Sam Patterson and other textile manufacturers used the river to power their mills.

The most prominent example of fall line settlement was the establishment of the cities along the eastern coast of the United States where the Appalachian Rise and the coastal plains meet.

== Climate ==
According to the Köppen Climate Classification system, Roanoke Rapids has a humid subtropical climate, abbreviated "Cfa" on climate maps. The hottest temperature recorded in Roanoke Rapids was 106 °F (41.1 °C) on June 30, 2012, while the coldest temperature recorded was −3 °F (−19.4 °C) on January 21–22, 1985.

Climate data for Roanoke Rapids, North Carolina, 1991–2020 normals, extremes 1972–present
Month	Jan	Feb	Mar	Apr	May	Jun	Jul	Aug	Sep	Oct	Nov	Dec	Year
Record high °F (°C)	80 (27)	83 (28)	88 (31)	94 (34)	97 (36)	106 (41)	103 (39)	104 (40)	102 (39)	100 (38)	85 (29)	83 (28)	106 (41)
Mean daily maximum °F (°C)	49.5 (9.7)	52.5 (11.4)	59.8 (15.4)	70.1 (21.2)	77.8 (25.4)	85.3 (29.6)	89.4 (31.9)	87.5 (30.8)	81.7 (27.6)	71.4 (21.9)	61.1 (16.2)	52.7 (11.5)	69.9 (21.1)
Daily mean °F (°C)	39.8 (4.3)	42.1 (5.6)	48.6 (9.2)	58.2 (14.6)	67.2 (19.6)	75.3 (24.1)	79.6 (26.4)	77.7 (25.4)	71.7 (22.1)	60.8 (16.0)	50.4 (10.2)	43.3 (6.3)	59.6 (15.3)
Mean daily minimum °F (°C)	30.0 (−1.1)	31.7 (−0.2)	37.4 (3.0)	46.3 (7.9)	56.6 (13.7)	65.4 (18.6)	69.7 (20.9)	67.9 (19.9)	61.8 (16.6)	50.2 (10.1)	39.8 (4.3)	33.8 (1.0)	49.2 (9.6)
Record low °F (°C)	−3 (−19)	0 (−18)	10 (−12)	22 (−6)	22 (−6)	35 (2)	44 (7)	47 (8)	33 (1)	26 (−3)	15 (−9)	4 (−16)	−3 (−19)
Average precipitation inches (mm)	3.66 (93)	2.93 (74)	4.32 (110)	3.60 (91)	3.43 (87)	5.05 (128)	5.37 (136)	5.23 (133)	5.49 (139)	3.59 (91)	3.32 (84)	3.50 (89)	49.49 (1,255)
Average precipitation days (≥ 0.01 in)	10.4	9.1	10.3	9.3	10.0	10.1	10.3	9.4	8.8	7.1	8.0	9.8	112.6
Source 1: NOAA
Source 2: xmACIS2

== Demographics ==
Historical population
Census	Pop.	Note	%±
1900	1,009		—
1910	1,670		65.5%
1920	3,369		101.7%
1930	3,403		1.0%
1940	8,545		151.1%
1950	8,156		−4.6%
1960	13,320		63.3%
1970	13,508		1.4%
1980	14,702		8.8%
1990	15,722		6.9%
2000	16,957		7.9%
2010	15,754		−7.1%
2020	15,229		−3.3%
U.S. Decennial Census

=== 2020 census ===
As of the 2020 census, there were 15,229 people, 6,569 households, and 3,761 families residing in the city. The median age was 41.1 years. 23.1% of residents were under the age of 18 and 19.6% of residents were 65 years of age or older. For every 100 females, there were 86.4 males, and for every 100 females age 18 and over, there were 81.8 males age 18 and over.

99.0% of residents lived in urban areas, while 1.0% lived in rural areas.

There were 7,248 housing units, of which 9.4% were vacant. The homeowner vacancy rate was 1.7% and the rental vacancy rate was 7.1%. Of all households, 30.2% had children under the age of 18 living in them. Of all households, 34.0% were married-couple households, 20.5% were households with a male householder and no spouse or partner present, and 39.2% were households with a female householder and no spouse or partner present. About 35.7% of all households were made up of individuals and 17.1% had someone living alone who was 65 years of age or older.

Roanoke Rapids racial composition
Race	Number	Percentage
White (non-Hispanic)	8,585	56.37%
Black or African American (non-Hispanic)	5,254	34.5%
Native American	85	0.56%
Asian	227	1.49%
Pacific Islander	4	0.03%
Other/Mixed	498	3.27%
Hispanic or Latino	576	3.78%

=== 2010 census ===
As of the census of 2010, there were 15,754 people, 6,437 households, and 4,180 families residing in the city. The population density was 2,019.7 inhabitants per square mile (779.8/km^{2}). There were 7,085 housing units at an average density of 908.3 per square mile (350.7/km^{2}). The racial makeup of the city was 63.6% White, 31.2% African American, 0.6% Native American, 1.7% Asian, 0.0% Pacific Islander, 1.7% from other races, and 1.3% from two or more races. Hispanic or Latino of any race were 3.2% of the population.

There were 6,437 households, out of which 30.9% had children under the age of 18 living with them, 39.9% were married couples living together, 19.7% had a female householder with no husband present, and 35.1% were non-families. 30.7% of all households were made up of individuals, and 12.0% had someone living alone who was 65 years of age or older. The average household size was 2.42 and the average family size was 3.01.

In the city, the population was spread out, with 21.7% under the age of 19, 5.9% from 20 to 24, 24.1% from 25 to 44, 26.1% from 45 to 64, and 14.8% who were 65 years of age or older. The median age was 37.9 years. For every 100 females, there were 84.84 males. For every 100 females age 18 and over, there were 79.51 males.

The median income for a household in the city was $35,388, and the median income for a family was $51,548 (2012 dollars). About 15.9% of families and 19.9% of individuals were below the poverty line, including 26.4% of those under age 18 and 10.1% of those age 65 or over.

== Industry ==
The city was first settled as a mill town, being home to multiple textile mills. Crystal Lee Sutton (Jenkins), was a worker and union organizer for the J.P. Stevens & Co. mill in Roanoke Rapids, upon whose union activities the movie Norma Rae was based. All the textile mills are now closed and nearly 3,000 employees eventually lost their jobs. Roanoke Rapids is now home to a WestRock paper manufacturing facility.

== Attractions ==
Roanoke Rapids is known for its many historical sites. The original Roanoke Rapids High School building or Senior building as it is sometimes referred, opened in 1921 and is still in use. The building embodies many elements of Elizabethan Gothic and Tudor Revival architecture in its castle-like facade. It was built by industrialist Samuel Paterson and designed by renowned architect Hobart Upjohn in a modified H-design. Hobart Upjohn was the grandson of Richard Upjohn, architect of Christ Episcopal Church in Raleigh, North Carolina and Trinity Church, in New York, NY among other notable buildings. The high school is the dominant building in the city's central core and is flanked by another castle-like structure which formerly housed a National Guard Armory and is now home to Roanoke Rapids Early College. In addition to Roanoke Rapids High School, the Roanoke Canal and Roanoke Rapids Historic District are listed on the National Register of Historic Places.

The Roanoke Canal Museum and Trail is one of the city's oldest historical sites. The 1823 canal lock building has been adapted as a museum to show the significance of the canal system to American westward expansion. It offers an in-depth look at the influential people who pushed for the Roanoke River to become a source of trade and navigation, as well as the commodities that were shipped and traded on the Roanoke River. The trail, over seven miles long, is adjacent to the museum and largely parallel to the Roanoke River.

Roanoke Rapids had planned Carolina Crossroads, an entertainment district founded by a group of local business developers. Attractions were to include the Randy Parton Theater as an anchor for the development, an outdoor amphitheater, RV park, hotels, restaurants, outlet shopping, travel center, several other dinner theaters, and water park. The association between the city and Randy Parton, brother of Dolly Parton, ended in December 2006. The city renamed the theater as the Roanoke Rapids Theater.

Carolina Crossroads and the theater in particular became a controversial matter because of the city's financial exposure. After nearly a decade of failed attempts to lease or sell the theater, the city sold the theater on July 23, 2018.

== Notable people ==
- James Anderson, former NFL linebacker
- Ricky Kej, 3-time Grammy® Award-winning musician
- Brian Barnes, former MLB left-handed pitcher
- John Armstrong Chaloner, writer
- James E. Cheek, university president
- Betty Cordon, socialite
- Chris Daughtry, singer and actor
- Ron Davis, former MLB outfielder
- David J. Dorsett, vice admiral, Director of Naval Intelligence
- George Grizzard, actor
- Nazair Jones, former NFL defensive tackle
- Meredith Kinleigh, Christian musician
- Kareem Martin, NFL defensive end
- J'Vonne Parker, former NFL defensive tackle
- Dawud Salahuddin (born 1950), Muslim terrorist
- Crystal Lee Sutton, labor activist
- Tom Topping, former first team All-American football player at Duke University
- Fred Vaughan, former colligate football player at NC State University
- Michael H. Wray, member of the North Carolina General Assembly
- Jack Boone, college baseball and football coach

== See also ==
- North Carolina Local Government Commission
